= Brightwood =

Brightwood may refer to:

== Places ==
- Brightwood (Washington, D.C.), a neighborhood located in the northwestern quadrant of Washington, D.C.
- Brightwood, Nova Scotia, a neighbourhood in Dartmouth, and part of District 9 of the Halifax Regional Municipality in Nova Scotia, Canada
- Brightwood, Oregon, an unincorporated community within the Mount Hood Corridor in Clackamas County, Oregon, United States
- Brightwood, Virginia, a census-designated place in Madison County, Virginia
- Marshall-Shadeland, Pittsburgh (aka Brightwood), a neighborhood on Pittsburgh, Pennsylvania's North Side
- Brightwood, Springfield, Massachusetts, a neighborhood on the northwest side of Springfield, MA
- Martindale-Brightwood, Indianapolis, a combination of two originally distinct neighborhoods, Martindale and Brightwood

== Other ==
- Brightwood (Hagerstown, Maryland), a historic home near Hagerstown, Washington County, Maryland, United States
- Brightwood, the fictional American town in the 2014 science fiction thriller film Transcendence
- Brightwood, a 2022 time loop film
