= Virginia State Route 230 =

State highway in Virginia, United States

State Route 230

Route information
- Maintained by VDOT
- Length: 20.58 mi (33.12 km)
- Existed: 1933–present

Major junctions
- West end: US 33 Bus. in Stanardsville
- US 29 / SR 231 at Pratts
- East end: US 15 at Madison Mills

Location
- Country: United States
- State: Virginia
- Counties: Greene, Madison

Highway system
- Virginia Routes; Interstate; US; Primary; Secondary; Byways; History; HOT lanes
| ← SR 229 | → SR 231 |

State Route 230 (SR 230) is a primary state highway in the U.S. state of Virginia. The state highway runs 20.58 miles (33.12 km) from U.S. Route 33 Business (US 33 Business) in Stanardsville east to US 15 at Madison Mills. SR 230 is the main east–west highway of Madison County. Through its connections with US 29 and US 15, the state highway links the county seat of Madison with Standardsville and Orange, the county seats of Greene County and Orange County, respectively.

== Route description ==
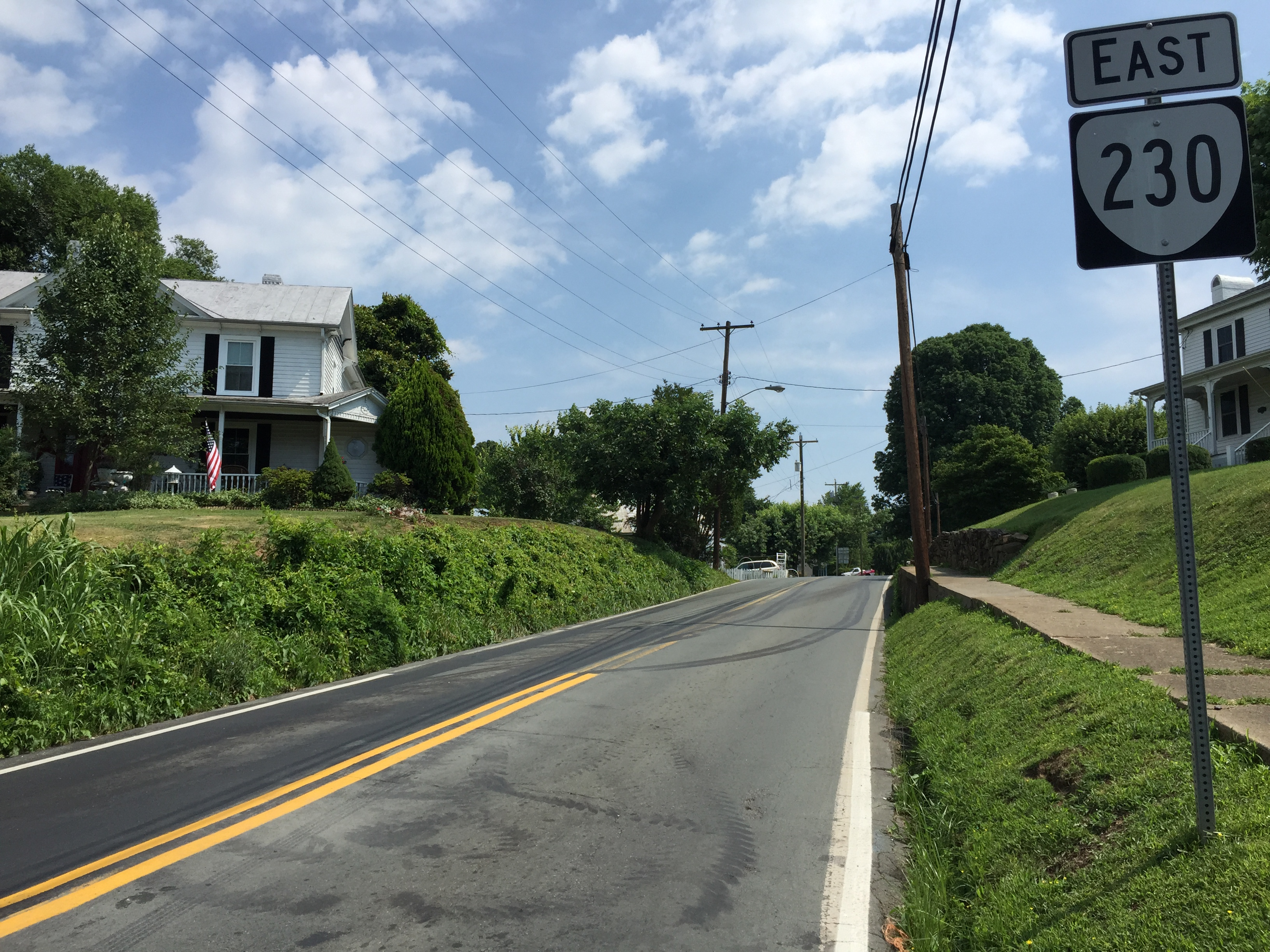
View east from the west end of SR 230 at US 33 Bus. in Stanardsville

SR 230 begins at an intersection with US 33 Business (Main Street) in the town of Stanardsville. The state highway heads north through Greene County as Madison Road. SR 230 crosses the Conway River into Madison County and its name changes to Wolftown–Hood Road. The state highway curves to the east at Hood, crosses the Rapidan River, and passes through Wolftown. West of Pratts, SR 230 turns north onto US 29 (Seminole Trail). The state highway follows the four-lane divided highway to the intersection with Orange Road, onto which SR 230 turns east while SR 231 joins US 29 to head toward Madison. SR 230 and SR 231 run concurrently on Orange Road to the center of Pratts, where SR 231 turns south onto Blue Ridge Turnpike. SR 230 passes through the communities of Aroda, Radiant, and Burnt Tree before reaching its eastern terminus at US 15 (James Madison Highway) at Madison Mills a short distance north of US 15's crossing of the Rapidan River.

== Major intersections ==
| County | Location | mi | km | Destinations | Notes |
|---|---|---|---|---|---|
| Greene | Stanardsville | 0.00 | 0.00 | US 33 Bus. (Spotswood Trail) – Ruckersville, Harrisonburg | Western terminus |
| Madison | | 10.87 | 17.49 | US 29 south (South Seminole Trail) / SR 626 (Gibbs Road) – Charlottesville, Lynchburg | West end of concurrency with US 29 |
| Madison | | 11.39 | 18.33 | US 29 north / SR 231 north (South Seminole Trail) – Culpeper, Washington | East end of concurrency with US 29; west end of concurrency with SR 231 |
| Madison | Pratts | 12.03 | 19.36 | SR 231 south (South Blue Ridge Turnpike) / SR 687 (Fairground Road) – Somerset, Gordonsville | East end of concurrency with SR 231 |
| Madison | | 20.58 | 33.12 | US 15 (James Madison Highway) – Culpeper, Madison Mills, Orange | Eastern terminus |
1.000 mi = 1.609 km; 1.000 km = 0.621 mi: Concurrency terminus

| < SR 703 | District 7 State Routes; 1928–1933 | SR 705 > |
