= Linn Banks =

American politician

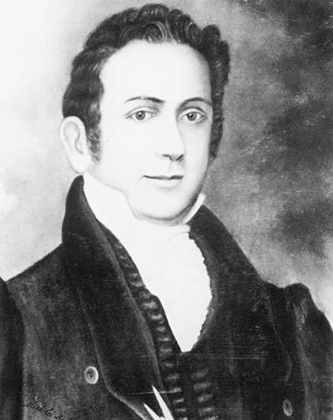

17th Speaker of the Virginia House of Delegates
- In office December 1, 1817 – April 28, 1838
- Preceded by: Robert Stanard
- Succeeded by: Thomas W. Gilmer

Member of the Virginia House of Delegates from the Madison district
- In office November 30, 1812 – January 6, 1839
- Preceded by: Pascal Early
- Succeeded by: John Booton/Robert A. Banks

Member of the U.S. House of Representatives from Virginia's 13th district
- In office April 28, 1838 – December 6, 1841
- Preceded by: John M. Patton
- Succeeded by: Extra Billy Smith

Personal details
- Born: Linn Banks; January 23, 1784 Culpeper County, Virginia, US
- Died: January 13, 1843 (aged 58) Culpeper, Virginia, US
- Resting place: Vale Evergreen Estate Cemetery, Graves Mill, Madison County, Virginia
- Party: Democratic
- Spouse: Eliza Jane Hunter Sanders
- Profession: Politician, lawyer, farmer

Military service
- Allegiance: United States of America
- Branch/service: Virginia Militia
- Years of service: 1812
- Rank: Lieutenant
- Battles/wars: War of 1812

Linn Banks (January 23, 1784 – January 13, 1842) was an American slave owner, politician and lawyer, who served for 26 years in the Virginia House of Delegates (including two decades as its speaker) but resigned in order to run for the U.S. Congress. He served one term and appeared re-elected, although that election was successfully contested by future Virginia governor and Confederate General Extra Billy Smith.

== Early life and education ==
He was born in what was then Culpeper County, Virginia (today part of Madison County) to parents Adam Banks and Gracey James. He was the great-great grandson of Adam Bankes, emigrant to Stafford County, Virginia, from the Wigan, Lancashire area of England in the mid-17th century.

Banks received a private education, then attended the College of William & Mary, where he studied law.

He married on April 2, 1811, in Wake, North Carolina, to Eliza Jane Hunter Sanders.

== Career ==
Admitted to the Virginia bar in 1809, Banks interrupted his legal practice to serve in the War of 1812. He would ultimately resume practicing law, as well as lead the local Virginia Militia for decades, hence his honorific as "colonel". In 1824, Banks hosted the Marquis de Lafayette on his return visit to Virginia, when he visited President Madison and local militia units in Culpeper and Orange counties.

Madison County voters elected Banks as one of their two (part-time) representatives in the Virginia House of Delegates in November 1812, and re-elected him many times over more than 25 years. He served from 1812 to 1838, alongside veteran William Morgan until 1814, then Daniel Field, George H. Allen, Robert Hill, Robert L. Madison, Robert Briggs and William Finks. When the Virginia Constitutional Convention of 1829–1830 instituted single member districts, Banks continued to represent Madison County. He also served as Speaker of the House for two decades, from 1817 to 1838.

Banks ran as a Democrat and won election to the United States House of Representatives to fill the seat vacated by John M. Patton's resignation in 1838. He only served until 1841, despite presenting credentials to the following Congress. Although he had appeared re-elected by a narrow vote over former State Senator William "Extra Billy" Smith, Smith contested the election and before the contest could be decided, Banks resigned setting up a Special Election the following November. Banks ran in the special election but lost to Smith. Smith assumed that congressional seat in December 1841.

Afterward, Banks resumed his legal practice, as well as managing his estates and enslaved labor. He owned 45 slaves in Madison County in 1820, and more than 40 slaves in 1840.

== Death and legacy ==
Banks drowned on January 13, 1842, while attempting to ford the Conway River near Wolftown, Virginia. He was interred in the family cemetery on his estate called "Vale Evergreen" near Graves Mill, Virginia.

Robert A. Banks, a possible relative, although the marriage license of his 1865 remarriage listed his father as G.J. Banks, married Louisa J. Finks (daughter of this Bank's co-delegate) in 1847, almost a decade after he succeeded to the Madison County House of delegates seat on March 2, 1839, and was re-elected several times, (though he too lost an election contest in 1841 to the same John Booton whom he had unseated in 1838). Robert A. Banks owned about 70 slaves in Madison County in 1850, and 82 in Madison County in 1860.

U.S. House of Representatives
| Preceded by John M. Patton | Member of the U.S. House of Representatives from Virginia's 13th congressional district April 28, 1838 – December 6, 1841 (obsolete district) | Succeeded by William Smith |
