= Frascati (disambiguation) =

Frascati is a town of central Italy.

Frascati may also refer to:

- Frascati (Somerset, Virginia), a 19th-century plantation
- Frascati (wine), a white wine from that Italian region
- Frascati, Warsaw, a neighbourhood in Warsaw, Poland
- Frascati Manual, a document stipulating the methodology for collecting and using statistics about research and development
- Roman Catholic Suburbicarian Diocese of Frascati, Roman Catholic titular see

== See also ==
- Frescati (disambiguation)
