= Greenway (Madison Mills, Virginia) =

Historic house in Virginia, United States

- U.S. National Register of Historic Places
- Virginia Landmarks Register
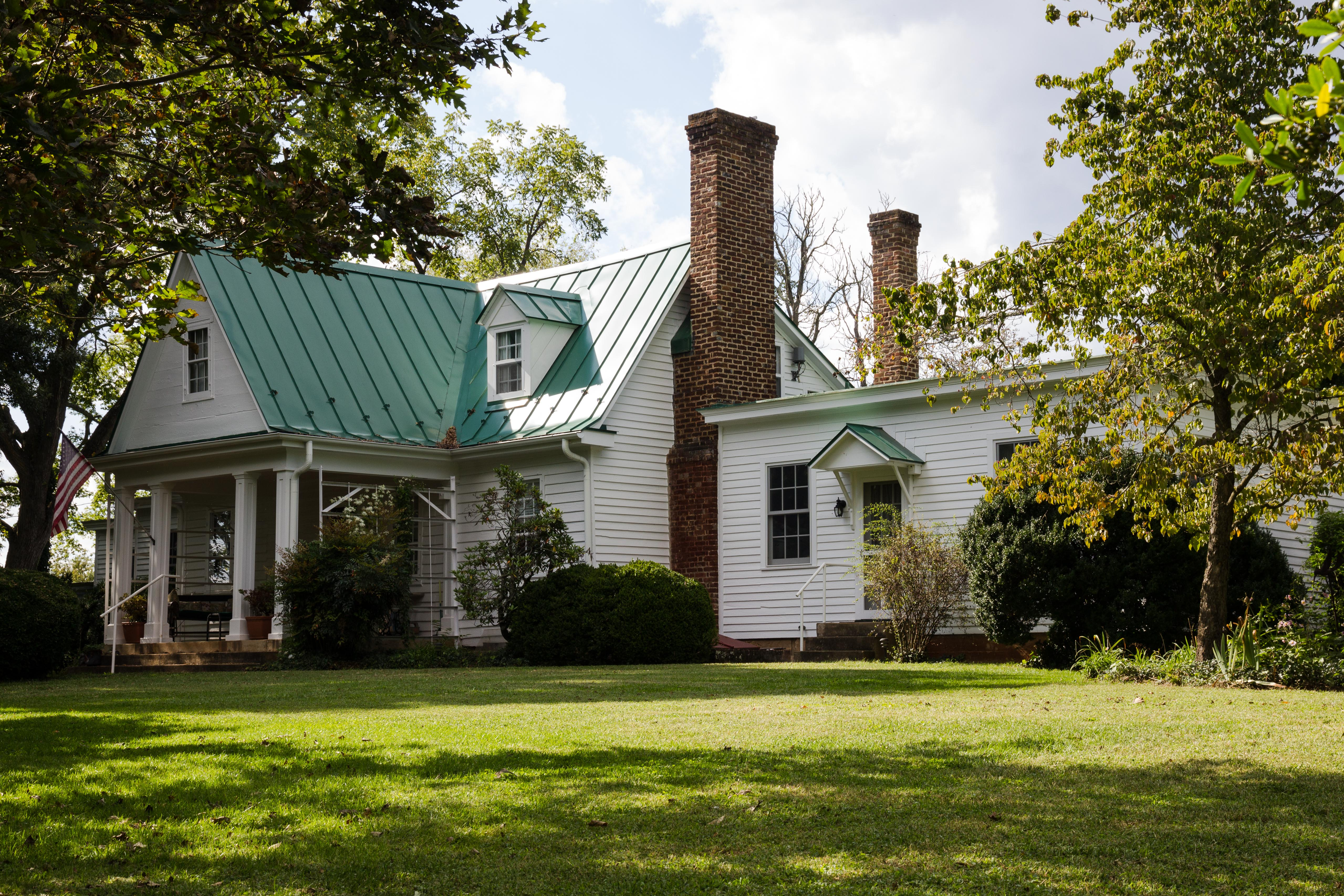

- Location within Virginia Location within the United States
- Location: US 15, Madison Mills, Virginia
- Coordinates: 38°17′9″N 78°8′32″W
- Area: 8.5 acres (3.4 ha)
- Built: c. 1780
- Architectural style: Colonial, Southern Colonial
- NRHP reference No.: 88002385
- VLR No.: 056-0020

Significant dates
- Added to NRHP: November 16, 1988
- Designated VLR: September 20, 1988

Greenway, also known as Prospect Hill, is a historic home and farm complex located at Madison Mills, Madison County, Virginia. The original section was built about 1780, and is a 1 1/2-story, heavy timber-frame structure, on a hall-and-parlor plan. A shed-roofed rear addition was added shortly before 1800. A rear wing was added in the early-20th century and enlarged in 1986. Also on the property are the contributing wood frame dairy / maids house; brick dairy / smokehouse; pumphouse (c. 1920); garage, corncrib, and the Madison/Taliaferro family cemetery. Greenway was built by Francis Madison, brother of President James Madison.

It was listed on the National Register of Historic Places in 1988.
