= Hoffman Round Barn =

- U.S. National Register of Historic Places
- U.S. Historic district
- Virginia Landmarks Register
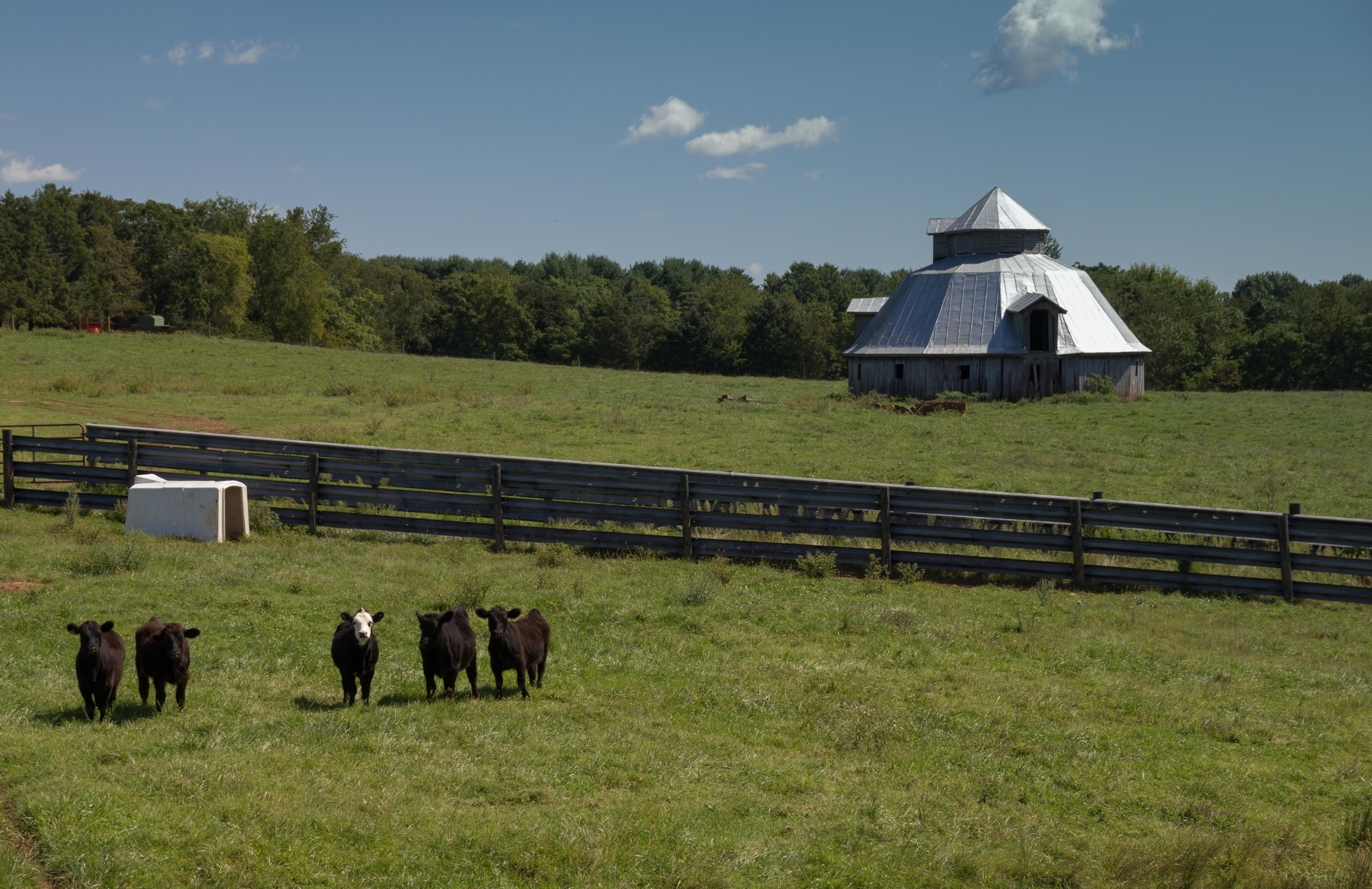

- Location within Virginia Location within the United States
- Location: 4864 Wolftown-Hood Rd., Wolftown, Virginia
- Coordinates: 38°20′55″N 78°19′53″W
- Area: 148.7 acres (60.2 ha)
- Built: 1913
- Built by: Haywood Montebello "Tiny" Dawson
- Architectural style: Late 19th and Early 20th Century American Movements, Round Barn
- NRHP reference No.: 09000242
- VLR No.: 056-5034

Significant dates
- Added to NRHP: April 20, 2009
- Designated VLR: December 18, 2008

The Hoffman Round Barn, also known as Gentry Round Barn, is a historic round barn and national historic district located near Wolftown, Madison County, Virginia. The district encompasses two contributing buildings, one contributing site and one other contributing structure. The barn was built in 1913. It is a 1 1/2-story, wood frame barn with 12 sides and a 12-sided standing-seam metal, mansard-like roof. A wooden center silo protrudes several feet above the level of the main roof, has a gable-roofed dormer on the east side, and is capped by a metal roof, resembling a cupola. Associated with the barn are the contributing Hoffman farmhouse and family cemetery.

It was listed on the National Register of Historic Places in 2009.
