= William Smith (Virginia governor) =

American politician (1797–1887)

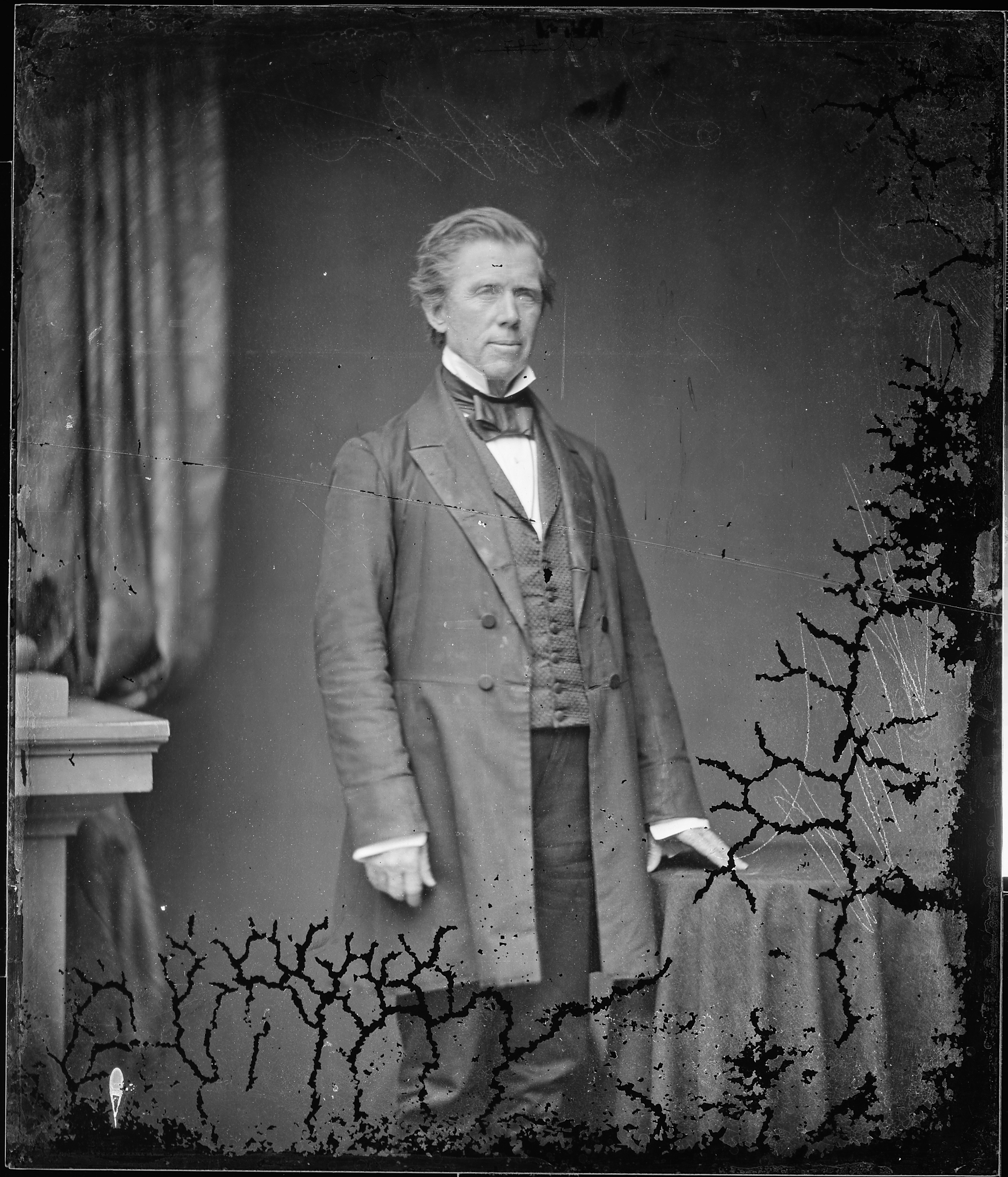
- Smith, c. 1860–1865

Member of the Virginia House of Delegates from Fauquier County
- In office 1876–1877; Alongside H. B. Kerrick

30th and 35th Governor of Virginia
- In office January 1, 1864 – May 9, 1865 (Disputed)
- Lieutenant: Samuel Price
- Preceded by: John Letcher
- Succeeded by: Francis Harrison Pierpont
- In office January 1, 1846 – January 1, 1849
- Preceded by: James McDowell
- Succeeded by: John B. Floyd

Member of the U.S. House of Representatives from Virginia's 7th district
- In office March 4, 1853 – March 3, 1861
- Preceded by: Thomas H. Bayly
- Succeeded by: Charles H. Upton

Member of the U.S. House of Representatives from Virginia's 13th district
- In office December 6, 1841 – March 3, 1843
- Preceded by: Linn Banks
- Succeeded by: George W. Hopkins

Member of the Virginia Senate from Culpeper, Madison, Orange, Rappahannock and Greene Counties*
- In office 1836–1840
- Preceded by: Daniel F. Slaughter
- Succeeded by: John Woolfolk

Personal details
- Born: September 6, 1797 Marengo, King George County, Virginia, US
- Died: May 18, 1887 (aged 89) Warrenton, Virginia, US
- Party: Democratic
- Spouse: Elizabeth Bell
- Profession: Politician, Lawyer

Military service
- Allegiance: Confederate States
- Branch/service: Confederate States Army
- Years of service: 1861–1863
- Rank: Major General
- Battles/wars: American Civil War; Battle of Fairfax Court House (June 1861); First Battle of Bull Run; Battle of Seven Pines; Seven Days Battles; Second Battle of Bull Run; Battle of Sharpsburg; Second Battle of Fredericksburg; Battle of Gettysburg
- Until 1838, Greene County was part of Orange County.

William "Extra Billy" Smith (September 6, 1797 – May 18, 1887) was a lawyer, congressman, the 30th and 35th Governor of Virginia, and a major general in the Confederate States Army during the American Civil War. On his appointment in January 1863, at 65, Smith was the oldest Confederate general to hold field command in the war.

== Early life and education ==
Smith was born in Marengo, then Richmond County, Virginia, now King George County, Virginia, to Mary Waugh Smith (born at "Mt. Eccentric" in Fauquier County) and her cousin and husband Caleb Smith. His maternal grandfather (also William Smith) served in the local militia and was wounded in Lord Dunmore's War. His paternal grandfather Thomas Smith fought in the American Revolutionary War (and overwintered at Valley Forge, Pennsylvania). His uncle Col. Austin Smith served in the War of 1812 and then represented King George County in the Virginia House of Delegates in 1814, 1821, and 1822. His mother's Doniphan ancestor had emigrated before 1663, and their joint ancestor, British naval officer Sir Sydney Smith emigrated circa 1720. The future governor had either six or seven siblings, including Rev. Thomas Smith (1799-1847), who was a minister at Smithfield, Virginia and later Parkersburg, West Virginia, and James Madison Smith (1808-1853). Billie Smith attended private school in Fredericksburg, Virginia and Plainfield Academy in Plainfield, Connecticut, then returned to Virginia to read law.

In 1820, he married Elizabeth Hansbrough Bell, of a similar social class. They had eleven children, several of whom died in infancy or as young adults. Their son William Henry (1824-1850) was lost at sea, and James Caleb Smith (1822-1856) was admitted to the bar in California but died in Nicaragua. Their sons Austin Smith (1829-?), Thomas J. Smith (1836-1918) and Frederick Waugh Smith (1843-1928) enlisted in the Confederate States Army. Each, for a time, fought under their father. After the war, Col. Thomas Smith married a Virginia judge's daughter, became U.S. Attorney for the Territory of New Mexico, and Chief Justice of the territory's supreme court before returning to Virginia. His brother Capt. Frederick Smith would move to South Africa and also live to old age. His nephew Caleb Smith (1824-1874; Rev. Thomas Smith's son) would resign his U.S. Army commission to fight for the Confederacy and be wounded at Bull Run. His brother-in-law Peter Hansbrough Bell was a Texas Revolutionary and Mexican War veteran who served as the third Governor of Texas from 1849 through 1853. His cousin William Waugh Smith (1845-1912) would fight for the Confederacy then become president of Randolph Macon College and found Randolph College, a women's college near Lynchburg.

== Career ==
Smith was admitted to the bar and commenced practice in Culpeper, Virginia, in 1818. About a decade later, in 1827, Smith established a line of United States mail and passenger post coaches through Virginia, then expanded the business into the Carolinas and Georgia in 1831. It was in this role that he received his nickname. Given a contract by the administration of President Andrew Jackson to deliver mail between Washington, D.C., and Milledgeville, Georgia (then the state capital), Smith extended it with numerous spur routes, generating extra fees. During an investigation of the Post Office Department, Smith's extra fees were publicized by U.S. Senator Benjamin W. Leigh. Smith became known as "Extra Billy" in both the Northern and Southern United States.

Smith owned ten enslaved people in the 1840 census. Interested in politics and a Democrat, Smith won election to the Senate of Virginia from the Piedmont district consisting of Culpeper, Madison, Orange, Rappahannock and Greene counties, and served from 1836 to 1841. He resigned during his second term, having successfully contested the election of Linn Banks to the Twenty-seventh Congress. Thus Smith served one term, from March 4, 1841, to March 3, 1843, but failed to win reelection in 1842 to the Twenty-eighth Congress. He then moved to Fauquier County.

Elected by legislators as Governor of Virginia in 1845, Smith served from 1846 to 1849, during the Mexican–American War, but failed to earn legislative approval necessary for election to the United States Senate during that period. As his gubernatorial term ended and consecutive terms were forbidden, Smith moved to California in April 1849 after the California Gold Rush and was president of the first Democratic state convention in 1850. Smith soon returned to Virginia and in December 1852 was elected to the Thirty-third Congress and to the three succeeding Congresses (March 4, 1853 – March 3, 1861). Although chosen for the Confederate States Congress, he resigned in 1862 in favor of military service. He was again elected governor in 1863 (this time by popular election in Confederate-held territory) and served until the end of the war.

=== Electoral history ===
- 1853; Smith was elected to the U.S. House of Representatives with 51.79% of the vote, defeating Whig Edgar Snowden.
- 1855; Smith was re-elected with 78.01% of the vote, defeating Independents P. Johnson Barbour and David Funsten.
- 1857; Smith was re-elected with 57.5% of the vote, defeating now-American Snowden.
- 1859; Smith was re-elected with 49.36% of the vote, defeating Independent Democrats Henry Wirtz Thomas and Henry Shackleford.
- 1863; Smith was elected Governor of Virginia with 47.77% of the vote, defeating fellow Conservative Democrats Thomas Stanhope Flournoy and George W. Munford.

== Civil War ==
When Virginia seceded from the United States, Smith declined to accept a commission as a brigadier general because he rightly admitted he was "wholly ignorant of drill and tactics". A few weeks after the war started, he was present during a U.S. Army cavalry charge at the Battle of Fairfax Court House (June 1861). He took command of the Confederate troops after the death of their commander John Quincy Marr and found he enjoyed the experience. He requested a commission and was appointed colonel of the 49th Virginia Infantry regiment just three days before the First Battle of Bull Run, where the regiment and new commander performed well.

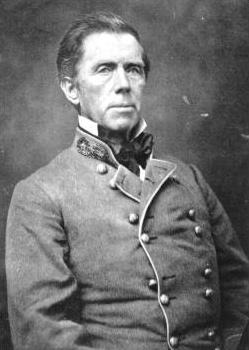
General William Smith

Smith served in the Confederate Congress in 1862 but returned to the 49th Virginia at the start of the Peninsula Campaign. He was wounded at the Battle of Seven Pines, and his regiment received favorable notice in his commander's report. During the Seven Days Battles, the regiment was lightly engaged, but he and his command again were described as having "characteristic coolness" and "fearlessness." He was known for expressing contempt for West Point graduates ("West P'inters") and their formal tactics, recommending common sense to his men instead of military education. He distinguished himself with his unorthodox field uniform, including a tall beaver hat and a blue cotton umbrella.

At the Battle of Antietam, Smith temporarily commanded a brigade in Maj. Gen. Jubal Early's division. He was wounded three times but continued to command, and Maj. Gen. J. E. B. Stuart wrote that he was "conspicuously brave and self-possessed." By the end of the battle, he had to be carried from the field. In recognition of his performance, he was promoted to brigadier general on January 31, 1863. He commanded a brigade in the Battle of Chancellorsville but achieved no distinction.

By the time of the Gettysburg campaign, Smith's superiors were leery of his performance. Still, they had to maintain some support since he was the former governor and, at the time, the governor-elect of Virginia. Early directed Brig. Gen. John B. Gordon to keep close contact with Smith and effectively exercise a joint command over their two brigades. During the Battle of Gettysburg, Smith refused to pursue retreating U.S. XI Corps troops, concerned that a U.S. Army force was approaching from his left, which was a significant reason that the Confederates failed to attack and take Cemetery Hill on July 1, 1863. Smith was the oldest general on the field and fought (unsuccessfully) the oldest U.S. general, Brig. Gen. George S. Greene, at Culp's Hill on July 3, 1863. He was the only general not commended in Early's official report and, as a result, decided to resign his commission on July 10. He nevertheless received an essentially honorary promotion to major general and Assistant Inspector General on August 12 and performed recruiting duty in Virginia until beginning his second term as Governor of Virginia in 1864.

== Postbellum career ==
Before the Gettysburg Campaign, Smith was elected again as Governor of Virginia and served from January 1, 1864, to the war's end. He was among the first Southern governors to advocate arming blacks to provide additional troops for the Confederacy. He occasionally returned to the field to command forces in defense of Richmond. He was removed from office and arrested on May 9, 1865, but was paroled on June 8.

He returned to his estate, "Monte Rosa" (later renamed "Neptune Lodge") near Warrenton, Virginia, where he engaged in agricultural pursuits. At the age of eighty, he became a member of the Virginia House of Delegates (1877–79). He died in Warrenton and was buried in Hollywood Cemetery, Richmond, Virginia.

== See also ==
- List of American Civil War generals (Confederate)

U.S. House of Representatives
Preceded by Linn Banks	Member of the U.S. House of Representatives from Virginia's 13th congressional district 1841–1843	Succeeded by George W. Hopkins
Preceded by Thomas H. Bayly	Member of the U.S. House of Representatives from Virginia's 7th congressional district 1853–1861	Succeeded by Charles H. Upton
Political offices
Preceded by James McDowell	Governor of Virginia; 1846–1849	Succeeded by John B. Floyd
Preceded by John Letcher	Governor of Virginia; 1864–1865	Succeeded by Francis H. Pierpont; Unionist Governor
