= Tetley (Somerset, Virginia) =

Historic house in Virginia, United States

- U.S. National Register of Historic Places
- Virginia Landmarks Register
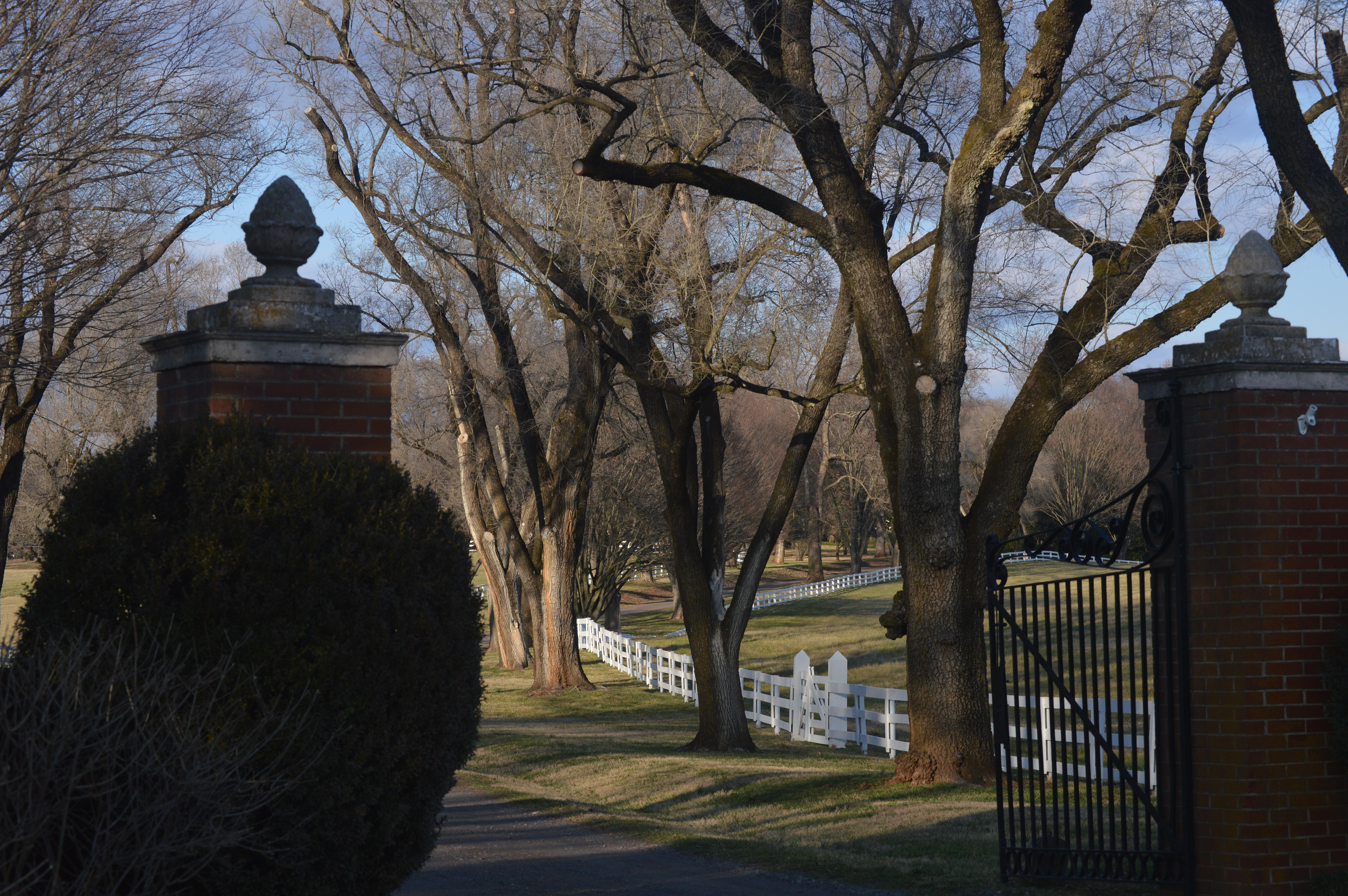
- Entrance to the farmstead

- Location within Virginia Location within the United States
- Location: VA 64 E of jct. with VA 231, Somerset, Virginia
- Coordinates: 38°14′19″N 78°12′15″W
- Area: 45 acres (18 ha)
- Built: 1843
- Architectural style: Colonial Revival, Greek Revival, Federal
- NRHP reference No.: 91000018
- VLR No.: 068-0106

Significant dates
- Added to NRHP: February 5, 1991
- Designated VLR: December 11, 1990

Tetley is a historic home and farm complex located near Somerset, Orange County, Virginia. It was built about 1843, and is a two-story, five-bay, hipped-roof brick house on an English basement. The house has Federal and Greek Revival style design elements. The front facade features two-story, pedimented portico added in the early-20th century, along with a two-story west wing and polygonal bay. Also on the property are the contributing two ante bellum slave houses, a brick summer kitchen, and an unusual octagonal frame ice house.

It was listed on the National Register of Historic Places in 1991.
