= Madison Mills, Virginia =

Unincorporated community in Virginia, United States

Coordinates: 38°16′51″N 78°08′27″W

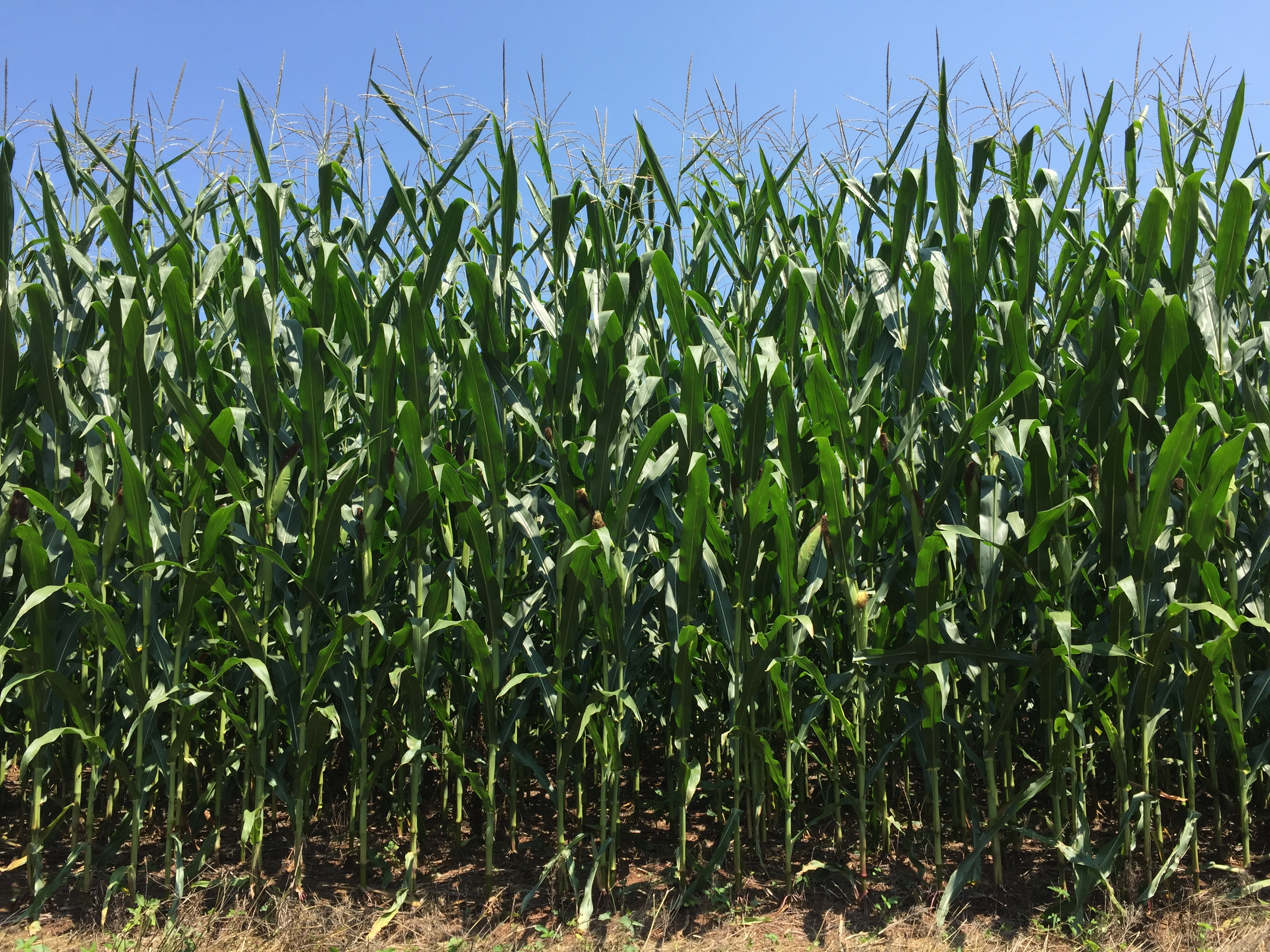
Corn field in Madison Mills

Madison Mills is an unincorporated community located in Madison County, Virginia, United States. It is located at the intersection of U.S. Route 15 and Virginia State Route 230.

Greenway and Willow Grove are listed on the National Register of Historic Places.

== Climate ==
The climate in this area is characterized by hot, humid summers and generally mild to cool winters. According to the Köppen Climate Classification system, Madison Mills has a humid subtropical climate, abbreviated "Cfa" on climate maps.
