= John Quincy Marr =

First Confederate officer killed in the American Civil War (1825–1861)

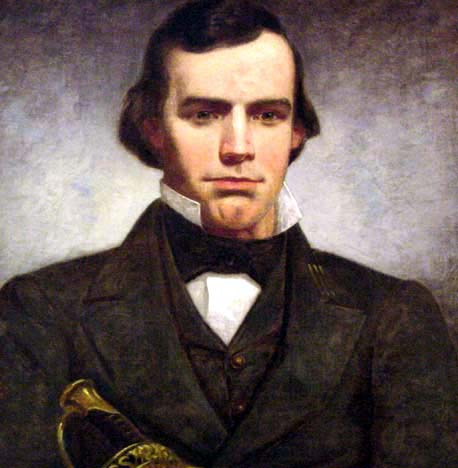
- Marr in 1861
- Born: May 27, 1825; Warrenton, Virginia, U.S.
- Died: June 1, 1861 (aged 36); Fairfax Court House, Virginia
- Burial place: Warrenton, Virginia
- Military career
- Allegiance: Confederate States of America
- Branch: Confederate States Army
- Service years: 1861
- Rank: Captain
- Unit: Warrenton Rifles company
- Conflicts: American Civil War; Battle of Fairfax Court House †

John Quincy Marr (May 27, 1825 – June 1, 1861) was a Virginia militia company captain and the first Confederate States Army soldier killed by a Union army soldier in combat during the American Civil War. Marr was killed at the Battle of Fairfax Court House in Fairfax, Virginia, on June 1, 1861. Marr challenged a force of between 50 and 86 Union cavalry troopers at Fairfax Courthouse on the night of the skirmish. Confederate soldiers later found Marr by himself, dead from a gunshot wound, possibly from a spent ball.

Previously one of Fauquier County, Virginia's two delegates to the Virginia Secession Convention of 1861, Marr initially opposed Virginia's secession from the Union but ultimately supported it, as did Virginia voters shortly before Marr's fatal skirmish.

== Early life and education ==
Marr was born on May 27, 1825, in Warrenton, Virginia, the son of Catherine Inman Horner Marr (1797-1879) and John Marr, Esq. (1788-1848), who had married in 1816. The elder John Marr was the grandson of a French immigrant with the surname "La Mar." The elder John Marr had been a Commissioner in Chancery in the Supreme and County Courts, much like a court-appointed trustee in later times, as well as a justice of the peace. He owned enslaved black persons, as would his widow and son John Q. Marr by 1860.

Marr graduated second in the class of 1846 from the Virginia Military Institute (VMI), His father died on June 3, 1848, and his elder brother Robert Athelstan Marr (1823-1854) was a United States Navy officer.

== Career ==
After graduating from VMI in 1846, Marr taught there as an assistant professor of mathematics and tactics. He returned home in 1848 to care for his mother and sisters Sarah/Sally (1819-1895), Margaret (1830-1903), Frances (1835-1918) and Jane (1840-1927). His younger brothers Thomas Scott Marr (1830-1897) and James Ripon Marr (1832-1879) left home by 1850. The local judges gave him the same appointments held by his father; Marr also served a two-year term as sheriff of Fauquier County.

=== American Civil War ===
After John Brown's raid on Harpers Ferry, Marr organized the "Warrenton Rifles" militia company.

In early 1861, Fauquier County voters elected Marr as a delegate to the Virginia Secession Convention. Although initially opposed to secession, and called home by a "family affliction" during the deliberations, he later signed the ordinance of secession.

On May 5, 1861, Marr was commissioned as a lieutenant colonel in the Virginia forces, but he never received the commission because it was sent to Harpers Ferry by mistake.

== Death ==
On Saturday, June 1, 1861, a company of Union army cavalry on a scouting mission entered the streets of Fairfax Court House after driving back one Confederate picket and taking another prisoner. At that time, two companies of cavalry and Marr's Warrenton Rifles infantry company occupied the town. The Confederate cavalry began to retreat and cut off part of the Warrenton Rifles from those who faced the Union cavalry charge. Only about 40 men from the company were in a position to combat the Union cavalrymen.

Lieutenant Charles Henry Tompkins of the 2d U.S. Cavalry Regiment led the Union force of between 50 and 86 men who separated into two groups as they rode through the village. Captain Marr challenged the riders, asking "What cavalry is that?" These were his last words. Scattered shots were fired as the Union cavalry rode through and Captain Marr fell dead.

Marr was not in the immediate presence of any of his men on a dark night so soon after he fell, no one knew where he was or what may have happened to him. His body was found later in the morning.

After Marr fell, first appeared former and subsequent Virginia governor and later major general William "Extra Billy" Smith, who had just resigned his seat in the U.S. Congress. He was from Warrenton and had helped raise the company. He took command in the absence of the company's leaders. Soon thereafter Lieutenant Colonel (later Lieutenant General) Richard S. Ewell, who had just been placed in charge of Confederate forces at Fairfax Court House, came upon the company. Lt. Col. Ewell had received a shoulder wound as he emerged from the village's hotel as the Union force first rode through the streets so he was bleeding as he took charge of the infantry company in the field and redeployed 40 of them. Ewell soon went off to send for reinforcements and Smith redeployed the men again in the same general area but in a less exposed position about 100 yards forward.

After the Union cavalry rode through the village, they regrouped and returned through the village streets. A volley from the redeployed men of the Warrenton Rifles turned them back. The Confederates fired additional volleys at the Federals as they tried to pass through town again on their way back to their base near Falls Church, Virginia. After a third failed attempt to ride past the Confederates, the Union men were forced to leave town toward Flint Hill in the Oakton area of Fairfax County to the north of the City of Fairfax with several wounded men.

Confederate casualties in the affair were one dead, four wounded (including Lt. Col. Ewell), one missing, according to their report. A later account states that only two were wounded, but five were captured. The Union force lost one killed, four wounded (including Lt. Tompkins) and three missing, who had been taken prisoner. The Union soldier killed was identified as Private Saintclair. Governor Smith later reported that Marr had apparently been hit by a spent round ball because he had a large bruise above his heart but his skin had not been penetrated.

== Aftermath ==
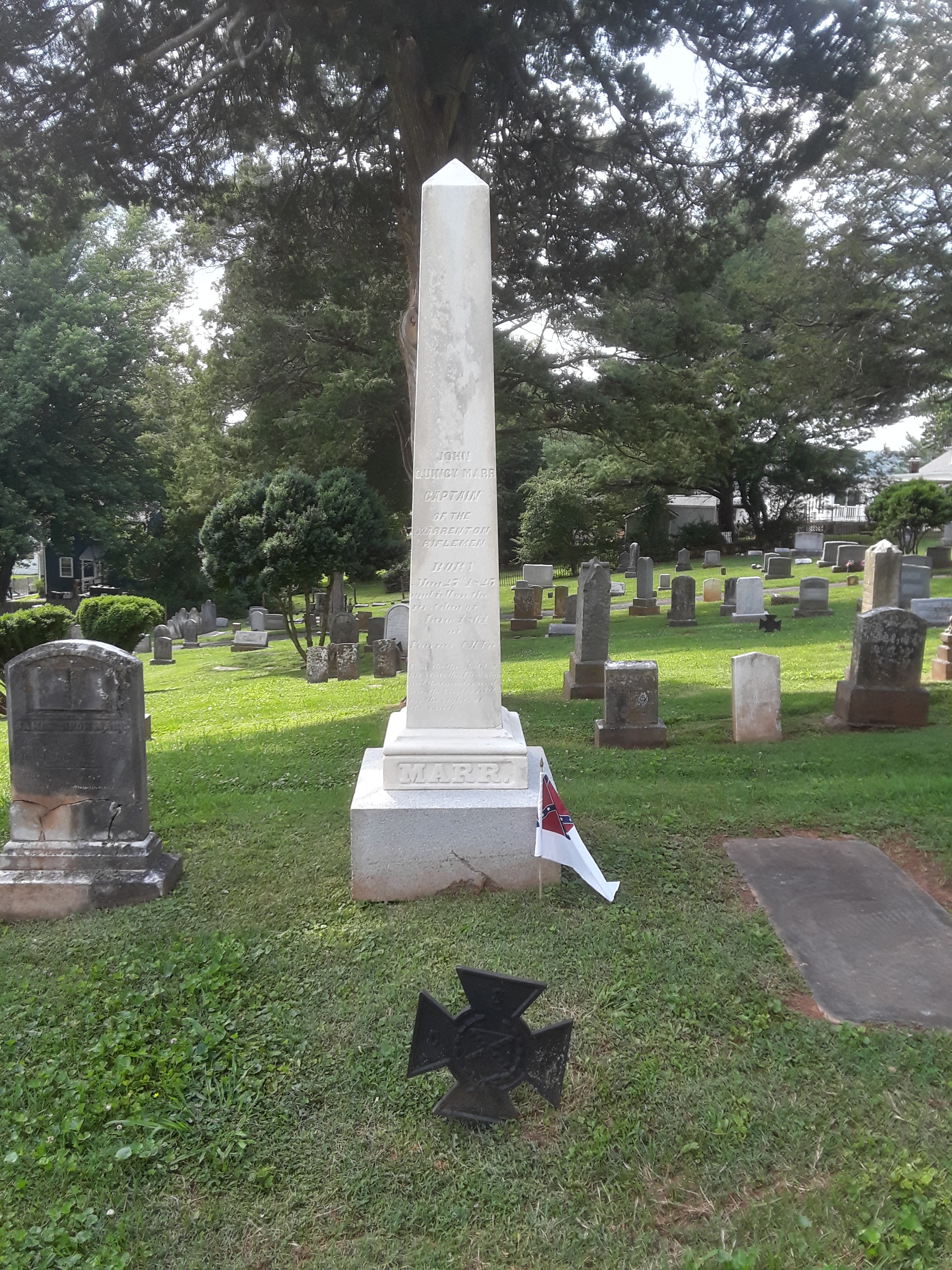
Marr's grave in the Warrenton Cemetery

Captain Marr's body arrived in Warrenton that evening. The following afternoon a large crowd attended a ceremony in the clerk's office yard before his burial in the Warrenton Cemetery.

Charles Henry Tompkins received the Medal of Honor for his actions at the 1861 battle. His was the first action of a Union Army officer in the American Civil War for which a Medal of Honor was awarded, though not until 1893. His citation reads: "Twice charged through the enemy's lines and, taking a carbine from an enlisted man, shot the enemy's captain." No other account referenced on this page states that Tompkins personally shot Captain Marr.

A monument to Captain Marr was erected on June 1, 1904, near the entrance of the Historic Fairfax County Courthouse, which was moved October 2020 to the Stuart-Mosby Civil War Cavalry Museum in Centreville, VA. The monument reads: "This stone marks the scene of the opening conflict of the war of 1861–1865, when John Q. Marr, captain of the Warrenton Rifles, who was the first soldier killed in action, fell 800 feet south, 46 degrees West of the spot. June 1, 1861. Erected by the Marr Camp, C.V., June 1, 1904."

== First Confederate casualty ==
Various authors have claimed that Private Henry Lawson Wyatt of the 1st North Carolina Volunteers (later the 11th North Carolina Infantry Regiment), the only Confederate soldier to die at the Battle of Big Bethel, Virginia on June 10, 1861, was the first Confederate soldier killed in Civil War combat. This claim stands only insofar as a distinction is made between the first officer killed, Captain John Quincy Marr, and the first enlisted man killed, which Private Wyatt appears to have been.
