= Willow Grove (Madison Mills, Virginia) =

Historic house in Virginia, United States

- U.S. National Register of Historic Places
- Virginia Landmarks Register
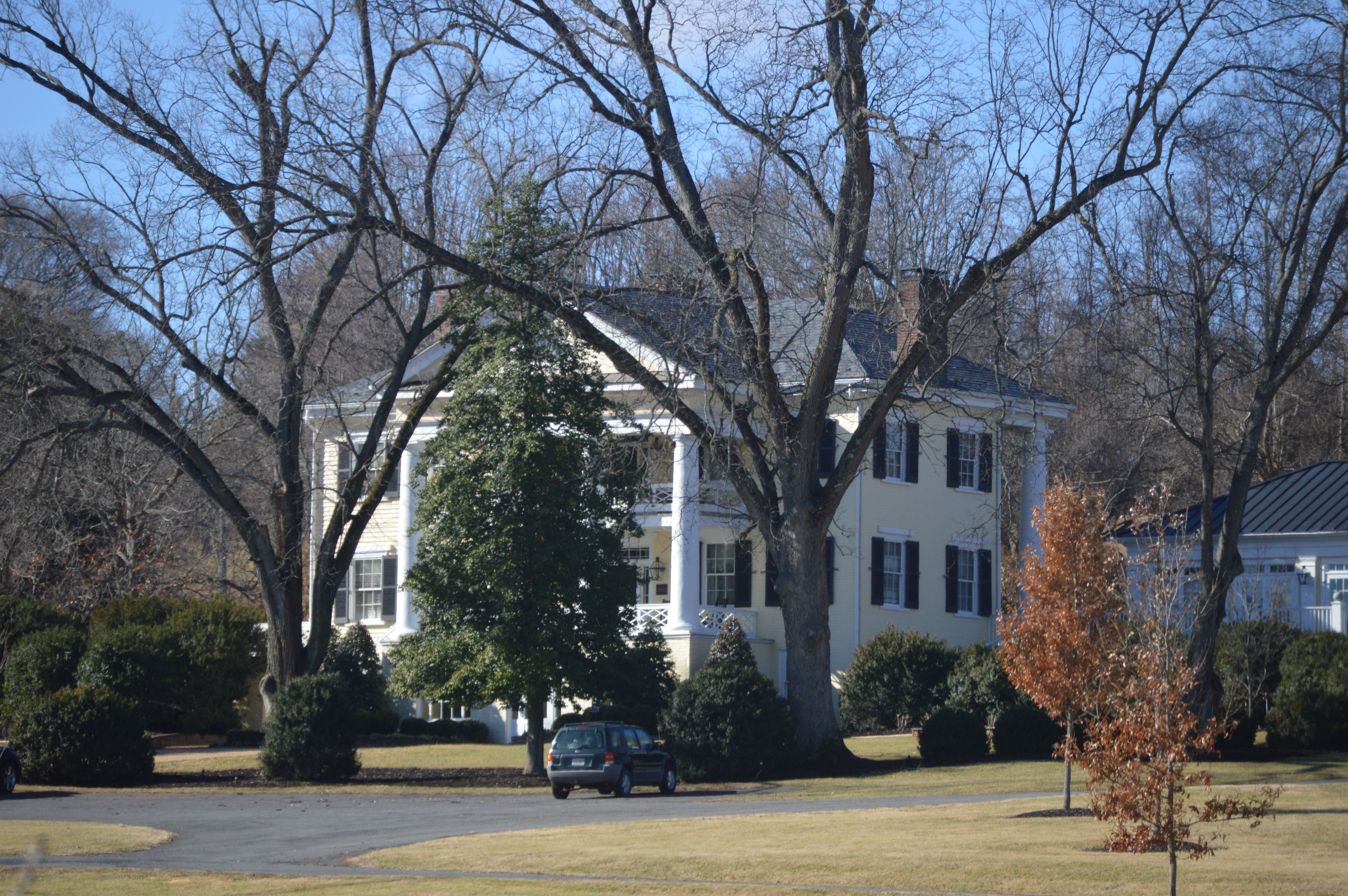
- Distant view from the east

- Location within Virginia Location within the United States
- Location: U.S. Route 15, 2 miles (3.2 km) northwest of Orange, Virginia
- Coordinates: 38°16′23″N 78°07′57″W
- Area: 25 acres (10 ha)
- Built: 1787
- Architectural style: Greek Revival, Federal
- NRHP reference No.: 79003063
- VLR No.: 068-0049

Significant dates
- Added to NRHP: May 7, 1979
- Designated VLR: November 12, 1978

Willow Grove, also known as the Clark House, is a historic plantation house located near Madison Mills, Orange County, Virginia. The main brick section was built about 1848, and is connected to a frame wing dated to about 1787. The main section is a 2 1/2-story, six-bay, Greek Revival-style brick structure on a high basement. The front facade features a massive, 2 1/2-story, tetrastyle pedimented portico with Tuscan order columns, a full Tuscan entablature, an arched brick podium, and Chinese lattice railings. Also on the property are numerous 19th-century dependencies and farm buildings, including a two-story schoolhouse, a one-story weaving house, a smokehouse, and a frame-and-stone barn and stable.

It was listed on the National Register of Historic Places in 1979.
