= Battle of Fairfax Court House (1861) =

First land engagement of the American Civil War with casualties

- Part of American Civil War
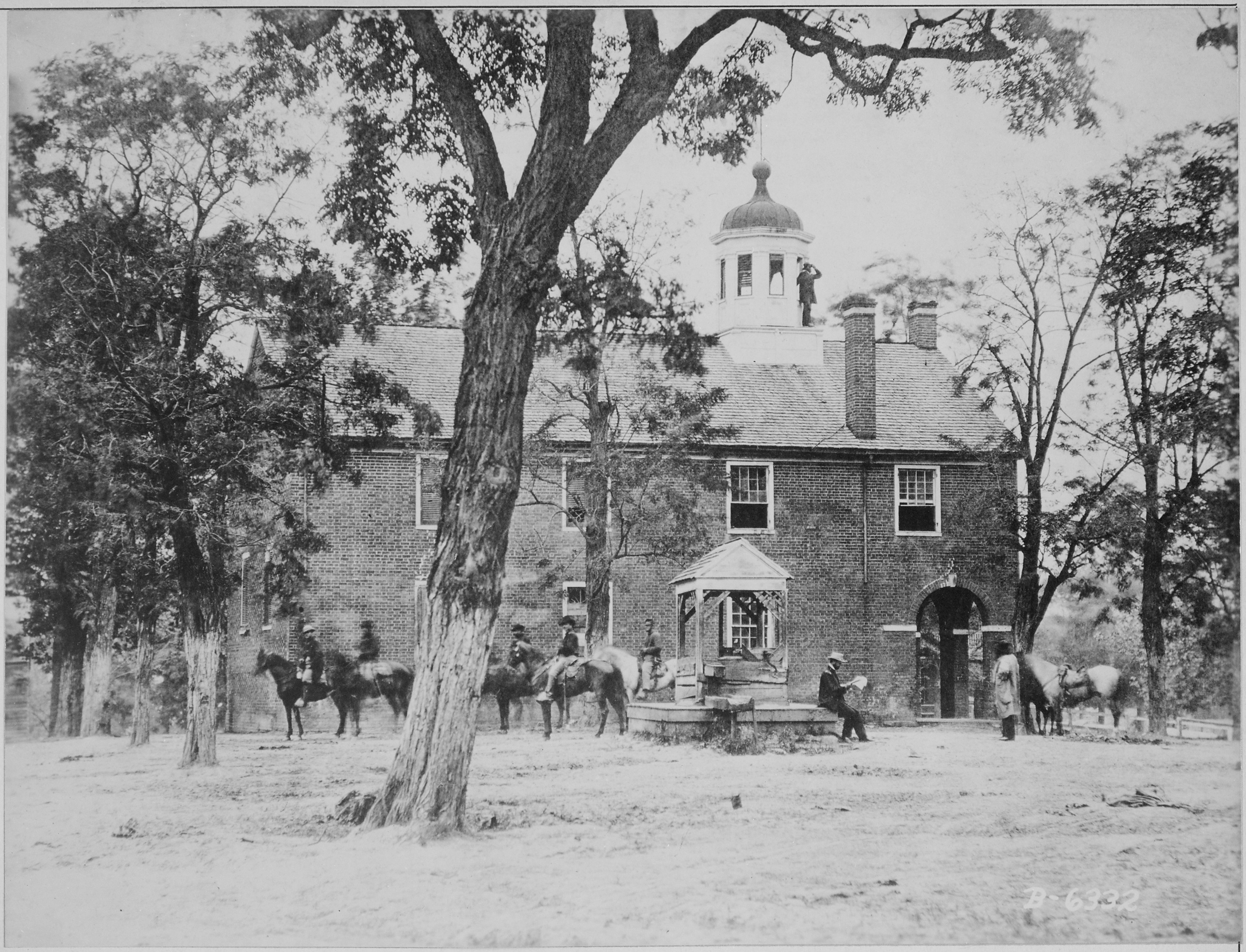
- Fairfax Court House, Virginia, a photograph by Mathew Brady now housed at the National Archives and Records Administration
Date	June 1, 1861
Location	Fairfax Court House, Virginia; Fairfax County, Virginia 38°50′46″N 77°18′25″W
Result	Inconclusive

Belligerents
United States (Union)	(Confederate States of America) Confederate States

Commanders and leaders
Irvin McDowell; David Hunter; Charles Henry Tompkins	Milledge Luke Bonham; Richard S. Ewell (WIA); John Quincy Marr †; William "Extra Billy" Smith

Strength
Between 50 and 86	Between 40 and 80 engaged

Casualties and losses
1 killed 4 wounded 3 captured	1 killed 2 wounded 5 captured

The Battle of Fairfax Court House was the first land engagement of the American Civil War with fatal casualties. On June 1, 1861, a Union scouting party clashed with the local militia in Fairfax, Virginia, resulting in the war's first deaths in action, and the first wounding of a field-grade officer.

The Union had sent a regular cavalry patrol under Lieutenant Charles H. Tompkins to estimate enemy numbers in the area. At Fairfax Court House, they surprised a small Confederate rifle company under Captain John Q. Marr, and took some prisoners. Marr rallied his unit, but was killed, and command was taken over by a civilian ex-governor of Virginia, William Smith, who forced the Union to retreat.

The engagement is judged to have been inconclusive. The Union did not gain the intelligence it was seeking, and had to delay its drive on Richmond, thus enabling the Confederates to build up their strength at Manassas in advance of the much larger bigger battle there, the following month. Tompkins was criticized for exceeding his orders, although they had been somewhat imprecise.

== Background ==
On April 15, 1861, the day after the surrender of Fort Sumter in the harbor of Charleston, South Carolina to Confederate forces, President Abraham Lincoln called for 75,000 volunteers to reclaim federal property and to suppress the rebellion begun by the seven Deep South states, which had formed the Confederate States of America (Confederacy). Four Upper South States, including Virginia, refused to furnish troops for this purpose and began the process of secession from the Union with the intent of joining the Confederacy.

On April 17, the Virginia Secession Convention began in Richmond, Virginia for the purpose of considering the secession of Virginia. A majority of the delegates immediately passed an ordinance of secession and authorized the governor to call for volunteers to join the military forces of Virginia to defend the state against Federal military action. Virginia Governor John Letcher appointed Robert E. Lee as commander in chief of Virginia’s army and navy forces on April 22, at the grade of major general. On April 24, Virginia and the Confederate States agreed that the Virginia forces would be under the overall direction of the Confederate President pending completion of the process of Virginia joining the Confederate States. These actions effectively took Virginia out of the Union despite the scheduling of a popular vote on the question of secession for May 23.

The popular vote of May 23, ratified the secession of Virginia. Virginia Governor Letcher issued a proclamation officially transferring Virginia forces to the Confederacy on June 6. Major General Lee, as commander of the state forces, issued an order in compliance with the proclamation on June 8.

On May 31, about 210 Virginia (soon to be Confederate) soldiers, occupied Fairfax Court House, about 13.5 mi (21.7 km) west of Washington, D.C. These were 120 cavalrymen in two companies, the Prince William cavalry and the Rappahannock cavalry, which then had about 60 men each, and about 90 infantrymen in a company known as the Warrenton Rifles. Fairfax Court House was a village with about 300 inhabitants and the county seat of Fairfax County, Virginia. Confederate Lt. Col. Richard S. Ewell, who had recently resigned as a captain of cavalry in the United States Army was in command of this largely untrained and ill-equipped force. He had only just arrived in town and met a few officers but had not been introduced to the enlisted men. Captain John Q. Marr commanded the Warrenton Rifles. On the night of May 31, only two pickets were posted on the road east of town because little threat of attack from Federal forces who were no closer than 8 mi (13 km) away was expected. The small Virginia force had taken this advanced position to help protect against the discovery of the build up of Confederate forces at Manassas Junction, Virginia, a railroad junction about 10 mi (16 km) farther to the south.

On the same day, Brigadier General David Hunter gave verbal orders to Lieutenant Charles Henry Tompkins of the 2nd U.S. Cavalry Regiment to gather information about the numbers and location of Confederate forces in the area. Hunter's instructions about entering Fairfax Court House were vague but he seemed to encourage a probe into town to discover more information. At about 10:30 p.m. on the night of May 31, Tompkins led a Union force of between 50 and 86 regular army cavalrymen, dragoons and a few volunteers from Camp Union in Falls Church, Virginia, on the ordered reconnaissance mission in the direction of Fairfax Court House.

== Battle ==
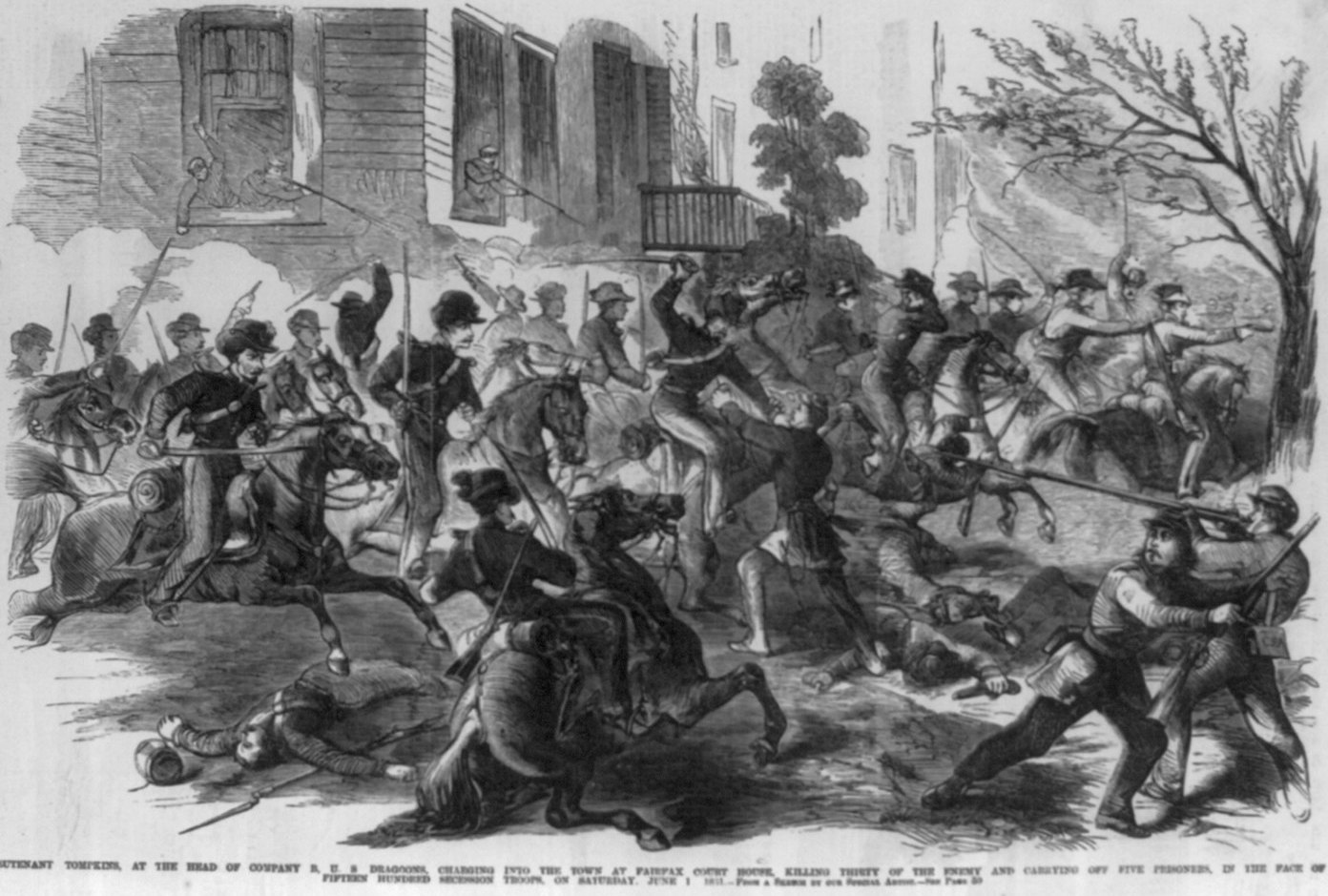
Lieutenant Tompkins, at the head of Company B, U.S. Dragoons, charging into town at Fairfax Court House, killing thirty of the enemy and carrying off five prisoners, in the face of 1500 secession troops

At about 3:00 a.m. on the especially dark early morning of June 1, one of the Confederate pickets, Private A. B. Francis, ran into the town of Fairfax Court House shouting that the enemy was upon them. The other picket, B. F. Florence, had been captured. A few of the Prince William cavalry tried to form a battle line in the street while others ran for their horses. As the Union force arrived on the Falls Church Road, most of the Confederate cavalrymen fled, leaving four of the Prince William cavalrymen in the street to be taken prisoner. Captain Marr moved his men into a clover field west of the Methodist church where they had been camped, just off Little River Turnpike, and formed them into two battle lines. Fleeing Confederate cavalrymen from Prince William came upon them and in the dark, some of Marr's men fired at them, wounding one of their own cavalrymen in the process. The Rappahannock cavalrymen had few weapons and no ammunition so they also fled forthwith when the Union soldiers arrived.

According to several accounts, Captain Marr challenged the riders, asking something like "What cavalry is that?" These would have been his last words. Scattered shots were fired as the Union cavalry rode through and Captain Marr fell dead. Some other accounts say he was killed while scouting out a better position for his men a little distance away from their line and do not mention a challenge to the Union horsemen. Whether he had moved up to challenge the Union riders or to scout out a better position for his company as some accounts suggest, Marr was not in the immediate presence or line of sight of any of his men on the very dark night when he fell in the dense field. Soon, no one knew where he was or what may have happened to him. His body was found in the clover field later in the morning.

The Union force rode west through town firing some shots at random. According to many of the accounts of the battle, the Union troopers fired at a man emerging from the hotel in town, who happened to be Lt. Col. Ewell, and wounded him in the shoulder. Regardless of the exact location where Ewell was wounded, he was the first Confederate field grade officer wounded in the war.

After the initial flurry of activity, the flight of the Prince William cavalrymen and the ride on through town by the Union force, the men of the Warrenton Rifles infantry company realized that Captain Marr was no longer present. As noted, Marr in fact was already lying dead in the clover field nearby, the first Confederate combat casualty of the war. Most historians have concluded that he was struck by one of the random shots fired by the Union horsemen on their first ride through town. The company was temporarily leaderless after Marr fell because the two lieutenants were on leave and Ewell had not yet arrived on the scene.

Former and subsequent Virginia governor and later Major General William "Extra Billy" Smith, who had just resigned his seat in the U.S. Congress, then emerged with his rifle from the house where he was staying on his trip back home to Warrenton from Washington, D.C. Smith, at the time a 64-year-old civilian, was from Warrenton, had helped recruit the company and knew many of the men. So he took charge of the company despite his lack of military training or experience. Ewell soon arrived but Governor Smith had to assure the men that Ewell was who he said he was, the Confederate officer in command, before they would follow him. Ewell then placed the approximately 40 men of the Warrenton Rifles that he found at the edge of the clover field between the hotel and the courthouse (or the Episcopal Church). where they were able to turn the Union force back to the west with a volley as the cavalrymen approached the Confederate position on their return trip through town. The Virginians were not in a good position to defend themselves, however, and after Ewell presently went to find a courier to go for reinforcements, Smith moved the men to a more defensible position behind rail fences about 100 yards closer to the turnpike. Civilians, mostly sheltered in buildings, joined in the shooting at the Union horsemen. This may have contributed to Tompkins's inflation of the number of men his force had encountered.

After having been driven back once by a volley from the Warrenton Rifles and civilian volunteers, the Union force tried to come back through town again. The Warrenton men again forced them to retreat with another three volleys. During the exchange of fire, Lieutenant Tompkins had two horses shot from under him. One fell on him and injured his foot. The Confederates fired additional volleys at the Federals as they tried to pass through town again on their way back to their base at Camp Union near Falls Church, Virginia. After this third failed attempt to ride through town past the Confederates, the Union cavalrymen were forced to leave town with several wounded men through fields toward Flint Hill in present-day Oakton in Fairfax County, north of the City of Fairfax, and returned to Camp Union by a longer route.

The Confederates initially reported casualties in the affair of one dead (Captain Marr), four (later reduced to two) wounded (including Lt. Col. Ewell) and one missing. A later Confederate account states that only two were wounded, but five were captured, which is in accord with the Union account which states five prisoners were taken and actually names them. The Union force reported one killed, four wounded (including Lt. Tompkins) and three missing. The Union soldier killed was identified as Private Saintclair. The Confederates stated that they took three prisoners and recent accounts agree. The Union force also had lost nine horses killed and four wounded.

== Aftermath ==
Besides the loss of Captain Marr, Confederate commanders, including Brigadier General Milledge Luke Bonham who was in overall command of the area, were unhappy about the lack of arms and ammunition which precipitated the flight of the Confederate cavalry. Union General-in-Chief Winfield Scott was displeased at Tompkins's impetuous charge which Scott thought exceeded his orders to scout the Confederate positions and by the fact that Tompkins spoke to newspaper reporters before he even filed his report on the action. Maj. Gen. McDowell praised Tompkins's gallantry but also criticized Tompkins for exceeding orders, without mentioning Brig. Gen. Hunter's role or what Tompkins's exact orders from Hunter were. He also said Tompkins unintentionally frustrated for a time "a more important movement." He also criticized Tompkins for speaking to the press before he had even filed a report.

Neither the reports by the participants nor the contemporary accounts in the newspapers about this battle were entirely accurate since both sides inflated the number of men on the other side and the number of casualties their force inflicted on the other side, at least initially. Because the war had just begun and no major battles had been fought, any sort of battle was given undue attention at this stage of the war. Although this battle faded into insignificance after larger Civil War battles with many more casualties were fought, it was notable in several respects, including the occurrence of the first Confederate combat casualty of the war, the first wounding of a field grade officer, an eventual award of a Medal of Honor for actions at the first combat for which the award was given, the failure to discover the Confederate buildup at Manassas Junction, the delay in Union Army action caused by the inflated report of Confederate strength in the area and the foreshadowing of the thousands of actions of similar type and scale that would occur during the course of the war. Historian Charles Poland, Jr. wrote that the significance of the Battle of Fairfax Court House was not that it was the first land battle of the war or that the first Confederate combat death occurred during the engagement but that it was typical of thousands of other skirmishes that occurred throughout the American Civil War. He also says it was "among the antecedents of the forthcoming first battle at Bull Run."

In 1893, Charles Henry Tompkins received the Medal of Honor for his actions at the Battle of Fairfax Court House. His was the first action of a Union Army officer in the American Civil War for which a Medal of Honor was awarded, although it was not awarded until 32 years later. His citation reads: "Twice charged through the enemy's lines and, taking a carbine from an enlisted man, shot the enemy's captain." No other account or source referenced on this page states that Tompkins himself shot Captain Marr. A monument to Captain Marr was erected on June 1, 1904 near the front of the courthouse. It read: "This stone marks the scene of the opening conflict of the war of 1861–1865, when John Q. Marr, captain of the Warrenton Rifles, who was the first soldier killed in action, fell 800 feet south, 46 degrees West of the spot. June 1, 1861. Erected by the Marr Camp, C.V., June 1, 1904." It was removed in 2020.

Several weeks later, on July 17, Union forces occupied Fairfax Court House as they began their move on Manassas Junction. The Confederates had abandoned the town in the face of the large Union force that was moving toward the first big battlefield of the war. The Union forces moved to Centreville the next day on their way to the preliminary Battle of Blackburn's Ford on July 18, and the First Battle of Bull Run (Battle of First Manassas) on July 21. Fairfax Court House and its immediate vicinity would be the scene of several small battles or skirmishes and raids during the war.
