= Charles Henry Tompkins =

Union Army General, Medal of Honor recipient

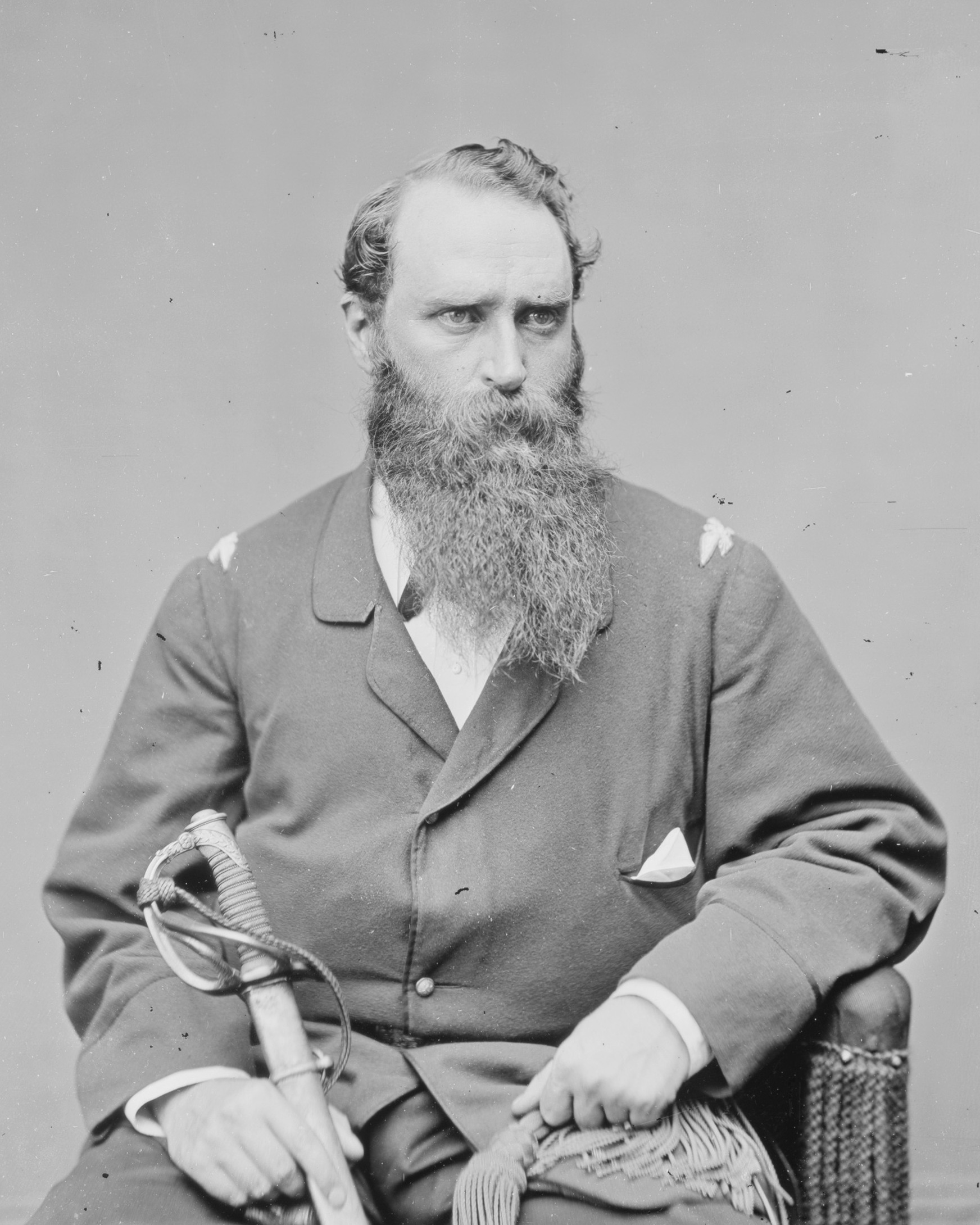
- Charles Henry Tompkins
- Born: September 12, 1830; Fort Monroe, Virginia, U.S.
- Died: January 18, 1915 (aged 84); Washington, D.C., U.S.
- Burial place: Oak Hill Cemetery; Washington, D.C., U.S.
- Military career
- Allegiance: United States of America; Union
- Branch: United States Army; Union Army
- Service years: 1856-1861; 1861-1894
- Rank: Colonel; Brevet Brigadier General
- Conflicts: Pyramid Lake War; Second Battle of Pyramid Lake; American Civil War; Battle of Fairfax Court House
- Awards: Medal of Honor

Charles Henry Tompkins (September 12, 1830 – January 18, 1915) was an American officer who served as a Union Army colonel, who received an appointment to the brevet grade of Brigadier General of volunteers during the American Civil War. He was a recipient of the Medal of Honor for valor in action on June 1, 1861, in the Battle of Fairfax Court House (June 1861). This was the first action in the Civil War for which a Union Army officer would receive the Medal of Honor, although it was not awarded until 1893.

He is not to be confused with another Union officer, Brevet Brigadier General Charles H. Tompkins (1834 – 1895) who commanded the 1st Rhode Island Light Artillery Regiment.

== Early life and career ==
Tompkins was born in Fort Monroe, Virginia, on September 12, 1830. He was the son of Colonel Daniel D. Tompkins, a career Army officer, and was the grand nephew of Vice President Daniel D. Tompkins.

He received an appointment to West Point from Brooklyn, New York, as a member of the class of 1851, though he did not graduate with his class. He resigned in 1849 for unspecified reasons. Tompkins pursued private business interests until enlisting as a Private in the First Dragoons in January 1856, rising to the rank of sergeant before his enlistment ended in January 1861. He served on the western frontier and was recognized for his performance at the Second Battle of Pyramid Lake near Pyramid Lake, Nevada, in June 1860.

Tompkins received his commission as a 2nd lieutenant in the 2nd U.S. Cavalry Regiment in March 1861. It was in this unit that he gained fame for his heroism in action at the Battle of Fairfax Court House (June 1861) while a 1st lieutenant, to which he was promoted on April 30, 1861.

Tompkins was reassigned to the 5th U.S. Cavalry Regiment on August 3, 1861, and served as the regimental quartermaster. On April 24, 1862, he received a volunteer commission as colonel of the 1st Vermont Cavalry. He resigned his volunteer commission on September 9, 1862.

During the war, he received brevets (honorary promotions) to major, lieutenant colonel, colonel and brigadier general.

== Medal of Honor citation ==
"Twice charged through the enemy's lines and, taking a carbine from an enlisted man, shot the enemy's captain." Captain John Quincy Marr was the first Confederate soldier killed in combat during the Civil War.

== Tompkins Stretcher ==
In 1866, Tompkins patented a stretcher he invented very late in the war. He then set off a major advertising campaign to promote wider adoption of his model. His marketing included his excerpt in Scientific American. It was featured in The Medical and Surgical History of the War of the Rebellion’s treatment of medical evacuation. The National Museum of Civil War Medicine has the only surviving copy of the stretcher.

== Postbellum ==
Tompkins was appointed as one of the nine officers assigned to the military commission investigating the conspirators involved in President Lincoln's assassination. Because of a dispute with General Grant, between 1866 and 1881 he was posted to numerous remote and austere western posts.

He served the remainder of his career in the Quartermaster Corps, rising to Assistant Quartermaster General on January 24, 1881. The position of Assistant Quartermaster General, carried a rank of colonel in the Regular Army, to which Tompkins was promoted the same day. He finished his career serving on the east coast, voluntarily retiring on September 12, 1894.

Tompkins suffered a broken leg in September 1914 and the wound never healed properly. He died of sepsis in Washington, D.C., on January 18, 1915. He is buried at Oak Hill Cemetery in Washington, D.C.

== Personal life ==
Tompkins married Ms. Augusta Root Hobbie of New York on December 17, 1862. They had seven children, four of whom reached adulthood. His eldest son, Selah Reeve Hobbie (“Tommy”) Tompkins, was an Army officer who became Colonel of the 7th Cavalry Regiment. His second son, Colonel Frank Tompkins, also served as a career army officer including notable participation as a major in the 13th Cavalry in both the raid on Columbus, New Mexico by Pancho Villa and the Punitive Expedition that followed for which he was awarded the Distinguished Service Cross.

== See also ==
- List of Medal of Honor recipients
