= Fannie H. Marr =

American poet (1835-1918)

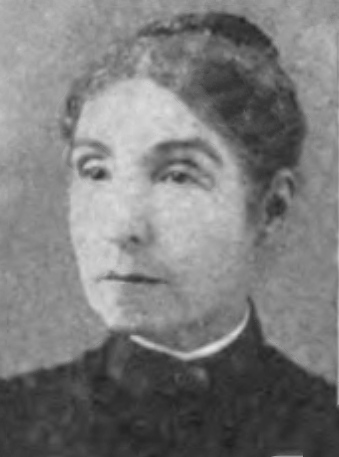
- Born: Frances Harrison Marr; July 2, 1835; Warrenton, Virginia, United States
- Died: October 18, 1918 (aged 83); Warrenton, Virginia, United States
- Resting place: Warrenton Cemetery, Warrenton
- Other name: Fannie
- Occupations: author; poet
- Relatives: John Quincy Marr (brother)

Fannie H. Marr (July 2, 1835 – October 18, 1918), born Frances Harrison Marr, was an American author and poet. At an early age, she contributed poems to newspapers and magazines. Many of her fugitive verses were incorporated in Local and National Poets of America and other standard collections of poetry. She was the author of three volumes of poems entitled Heart Life in Song (1874), Virginia and Other Poems (1881), and Songs of Faith (1888).

== Early life and education ==
Fannie Marr was born in Warrenton, Fauquier County, Virginia on July 2, 1835. Of French and Scotch descent, her parents were Catherine Inman (née Horner) Marr (1797-1879) and John Marr (1788-1848), who had married in 1816.

John Marr was the grandson of a French immigrant with the surname "La Mar". John Marr had been a Commissioner in Chancery in the Supreme and County Courts, much like a court-appointed trustee in later times, as well as a justice of the peace. He owned enslaved African Americans, (Note: 1840 U.S. Federal Census for Leeds, Fauquier County, Virginia shows John Marr as owing 6 or 7 male and 7 female black slaves. The 1850 U.S. Federal census slave schedules for the family may have been misdigitized or missing.) as would his widow and a son, John Quincy Marr, by 1860. (Note: Virginia's 1860 slave schedules for both Catherine "J" Marr and John "D" Marr of Fauquier County are referenced by ancestry.com, but not available online. The 1860 U.S. Federal Census for the Southwest Revenue District of Fauquier County shows Catherine as owning a 17 year old male and 45 and 19 year old female black slaves. The corresponding 1860 federal census slave schedule for John Q. Marr may have been misdigitized or missing.)

Fannie's brother, John Quincy Marr (1825–1861), taught at Virginia Military Institute (VMI) as an assistant professor of mathematics and tactics after graduating, but he returned home in 1848 to care for his mother and sisters Sarah/Sally (1819-1895), Margaret (1830-1903), Frances, and Jane (1840-1927). Her brothers, Thomas Scott Marr (1830-1897) and James Ripon Marr (1832-1879), left home by 1850. Her brother, Robert Athelstan Marr (1823-1854), was a Lieutenant in the United States Navy; he took part in the Mexican–American War; fired the first shot in the naval attack on Vera Cruz; and was lost in the Caribbean Sea with the entire crew of the USS Albany, in October, 1854. John Q. was a member of the Virginia Secession Convention of 1861. He served as captain of the Warrenton Rifles, Seventeenth Virginia Regiment, and was the first Confederate soldier killed in an engagement with the enemy during the American Civil War, being shot at Fairfax Court House, in July 1861.

Fannie Marr was educated in the public and private schools of the South. Owing to her delicate health, she had only four years of school education.

== Career ==
Marr taught for several years after the Civil War, and then began to write more for amusement than from any other reasons. She published her works under the name "Fannie H. Marr", and won the prize offered by a Georgia paper.

Her first collection of poems, Heart Life in Song, at 165 pages, was published in 1874 in Baltimore, by Turnbull brothers. A second edition of 183 pages was published in 1883. In 1881, her Virginia and Other Poems appeared, published in Philadelphia, by Sherman & Co. The longer poems in this book are the weaker. The best are those of religious feeling; they are short, rhythmical and tender.

According to Painter in Poets of Virginia (1907), these two volumes deal with plain, homely themes, as may be judged from such titles as "Old Letters", "Family Portraits", "To My Books", and "Summer Evening". They show a good degree of poetic feeling and literary skill; and if there is a tendency to diffuseness, it included a pure and gentle spirit. In the preface of one of the volumes, Marr writes of the sources from which she drew inspiration. A religious sentiment is dominant with nothing of the doubts and vagaries of skepticism. In a time of theological unrest and innovating beliefs, she preferred to follow the old paths. In "A Simile", Marr gives expression to St. Augustine's thought that the human soul was made for God, and is never entirely at peace till it finds Him. The title poem of the second volume was inspired by a patriotic love; and perhaps nowhere else have the glories of Virginia been more fully and successfully sung. It is divided into eight brief parts. In "Life" the author reaches as high a strain as in any other of her pieces. She believes in the worth and dignity of life, and "the boon of immortality". Songs of Faith came out in 1888. These poems were described as being full of faith, trust, and love. Her religious ones were "pure and tender, and they have comforted the mourning and soothed the dying".

Marr's poem, "My Suit of Confederate Gray", was written in 1889, and published in The Baltimore Sun approximately one year after, accredited to her. It was then copied by a number of newspapers in the South, as its sentiment struck a responsive chord with those who sympathized with the Confederate cause. On February 4, 1907, the poem was re-published in The Baltimore Sun, this time being attributed to James Clay, a citizen of Baltimore, but the plagiarism was promptly exposed.

Marr wrote a number of other poems, some of which were published in The Baltimore Sun. Of one of them, “Memorial Flowers," the editor of the paper in which it was published wrote: "It glows with poetic fire".

== Personal life ==
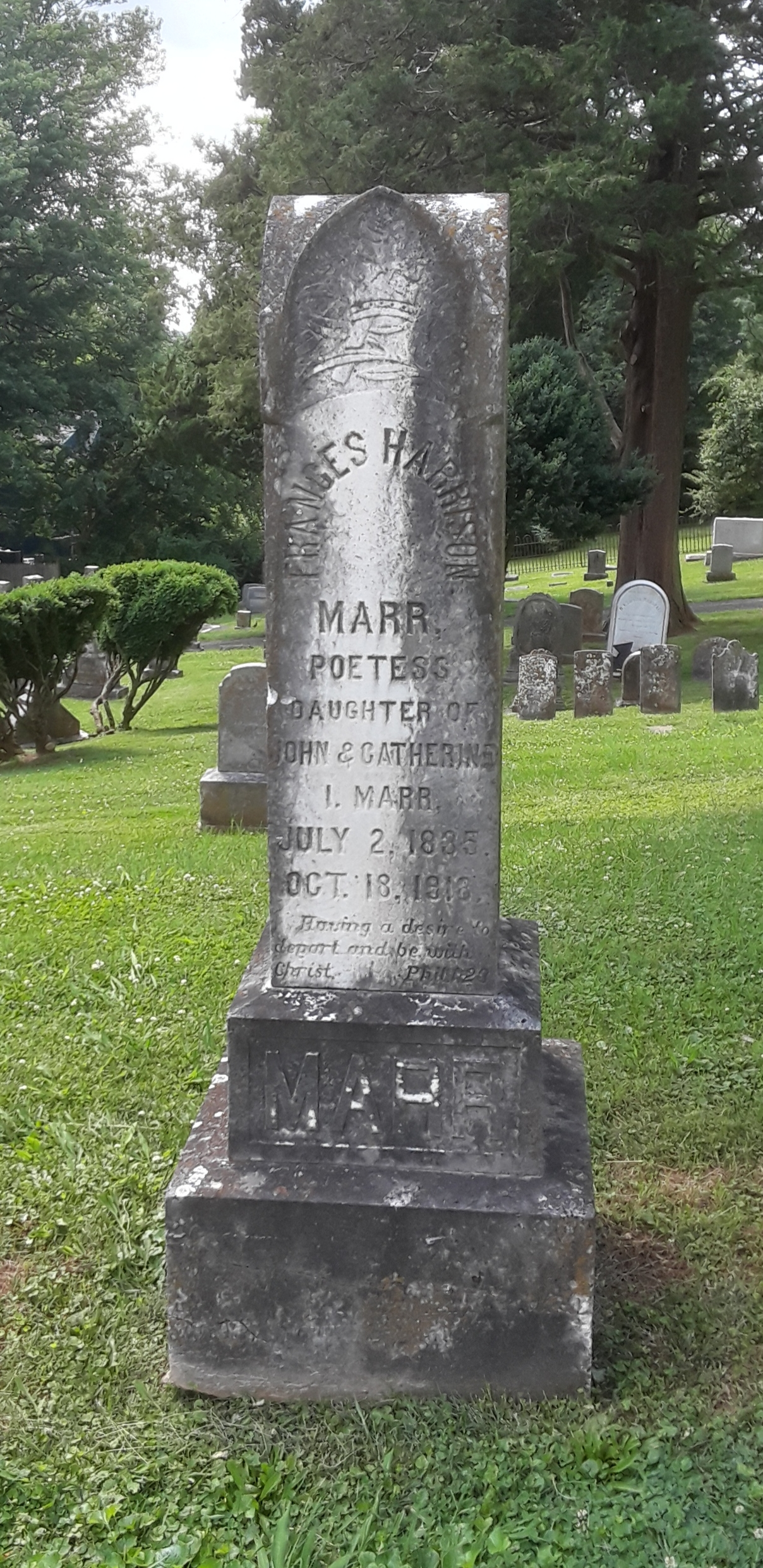
Marr's grave in the Warrenton Cemetery

Since birth, Marr resided continuously in Warrenton, living at the old home owned by her grandfather over a century earlier. She died at her home on October 18, 1918. The funeral took place at St. James' Episcopal Church, Warrenton, and interment was at Warrenton Cemetery in her home town. Her sister, Jane, survived her, as well as three nephews.

== Publications ==
- Heart-Life in Song, 1874
- Virginia and Other Poems, 1881
- Songs of Faith, 1888
