= Old Rag, Virginia =

Unincorporated community in Virginia, United States

Coordinates: 38°33′25″N 78°19′59″W

Old Rag (sometimes written Oldrag) was an unincorporated community located in Madison County, Virginia, United States, on Old Rag Mountain. Originally known as Weakley Valley, Old Rag was inhabited by white people in the 1770s. By 1900, Old Rag had a post office, a school, two churches and two stores, and a cemetery.

In 1936 the Old Rag post office, which was the last remaining post office in Shenandoah National Park, closed permanently. Residents of Old Rag and several other communities were resettled to Ida Valley near the Madison Courthouse.
