= Virginia State Route 231 =

State highway in Virginia, United States

State Route 231

Route information
- Maintained by VDOT
- Length: 49.82 mi (80.18 km)
- Existed: 1933–present
- Tourist routes: Journey Through Hallowed Ground Byway; Virginia Byway

Major junctions
- South end: SR 22 in Cismont
- US 15 / US 33 in Gordonsville; SR 20 in Somerset; SR 230 at Pratts; US 29 in Madison
- North end: US 522 near Sperryville

Location
- Country: United States
- State: Virginia
- Counties: Albemarle, Louisa, Orange, Madison, Rappahannock

Highway system
- Virginia Routes; Interstate; US; Primary; Secondary; Byways; History; HOT lanes
← SR 230	→ SR 232

State Route 231 (SR 231) is a primary state highway in the U.S. state of Virginia. The state highway runs 49.82 miles (80.18 km) from SR 22 in Cismont north to U.S. Route 522 (US 522) near Sperryville. SR 231 forms part of the connection between Charlottesville and Gordonsville, where the highway meets US 15 and US 33.

The state highway also serves as the main north–south highway of Madison County, connecting the county seat of Madison, where the highway intersects US 29, with Gordonsville to the south and passing through the foothills of the Blue Ridge Mountains to the north. Almost all of SR 231 is a Virginia Byway.

== Route description ==
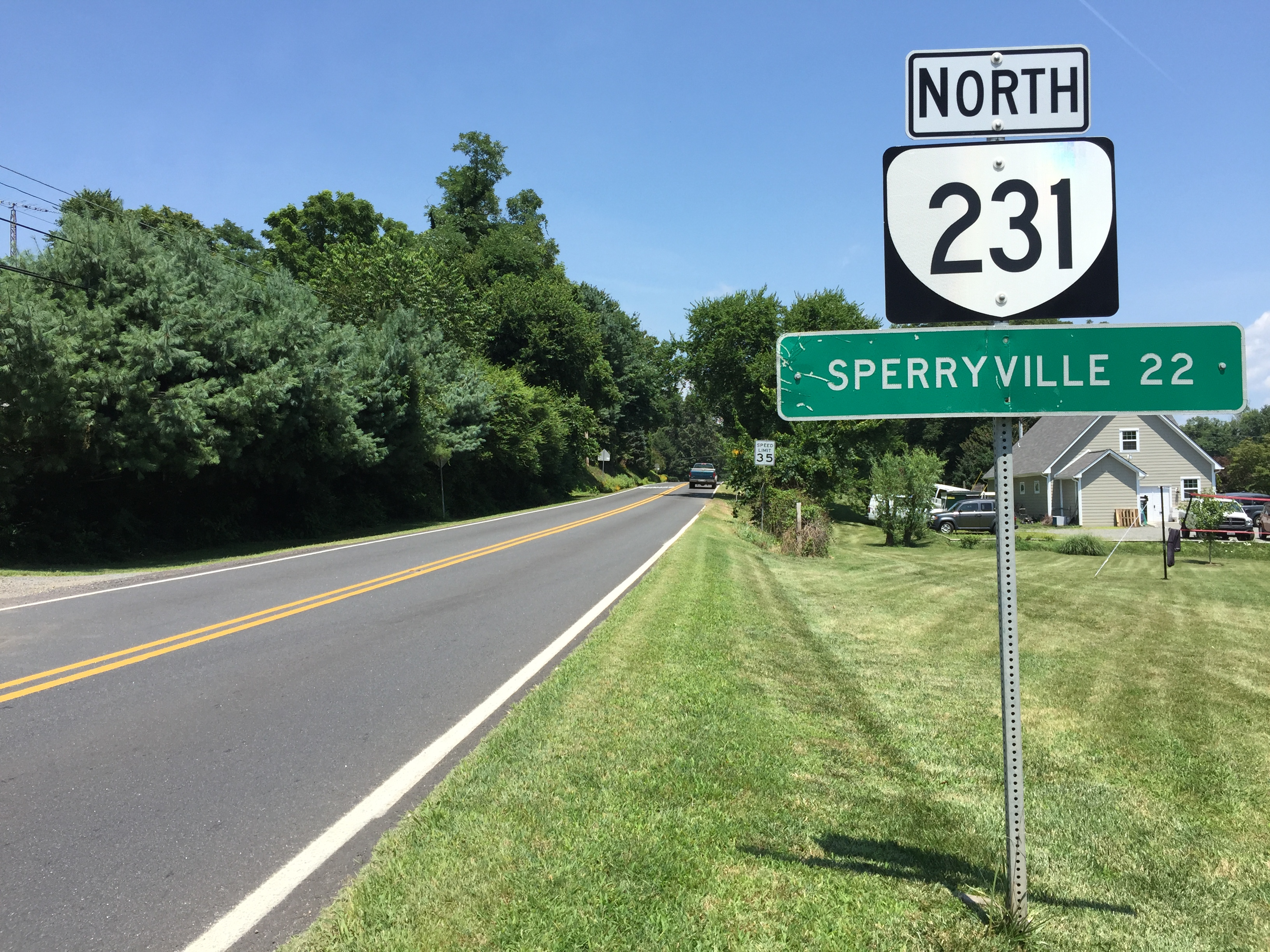
View north along SR 231 north of US 29 Bus. in Madison

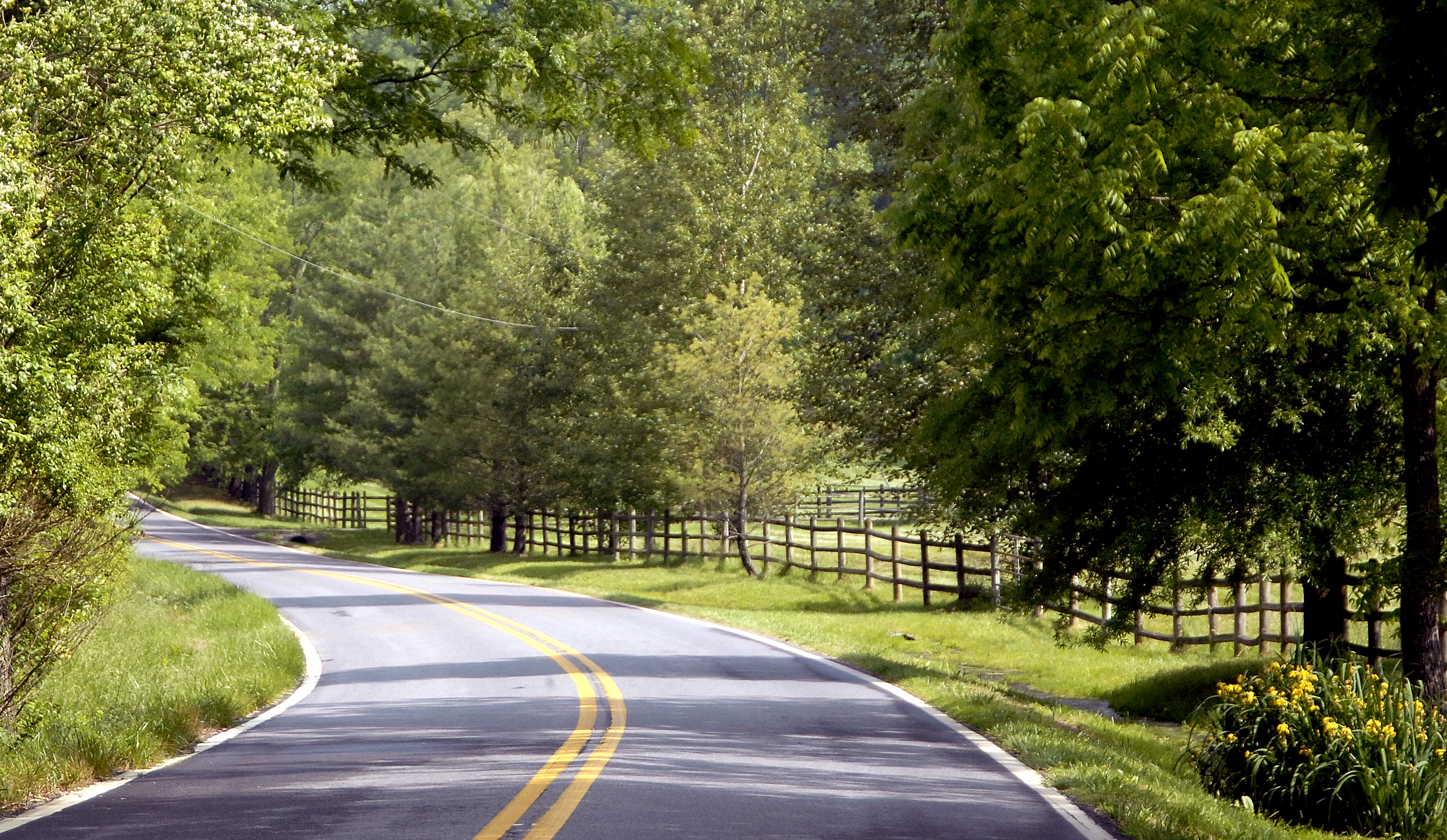
Virginia Route 231 in Albemarle County

SR 231 begins at an acute intersection with SR 22 (Louisa Road) at the southern end of the village of Cismont in northeastern Albemarle County. The state highway heads northeast as Gordonsville Road through the village, which contains historic Grace Episcopal Church. SR 231 parallels the eastern flank of the Southwest Mountains and passes through Cash Corner, the site of the historic plantation Castle Hill. The state highway becomes Gordon Avenue as it passes through the northwestern corner of Louisa County just south of the Albemarle–Louisa–Orange county tripoint. Shortly after entering Orange County, SR 231 enters the town of Gordonsville, where the highway meets US 15 and US 33 at Gordonsville Circle. Southbound US 15 and eastbound US 33 follow the southeast leg of the roundabout, Main Street, into the center of town. Northbound US 15 follows Gordon Avenue northeast toward Orange. SR 231 and US 33 run concurrently northwest on Main Street to the western town limit, where the U.S. Highway heads west on Spotswood Trail and the state highway turns northwest onto Blue Ridge Turnpike.

SR 231 has a curvaceous path as it crosses the northern remnants of the Southwest Mountains. The state highway passes the historic plantation Frascati before passing under Norfolk Southern Railway's Washington District in the village of Somerset. SR 231 intersects SR 20 (Constitution Highway) and crosses the Rapidan River into Madison County. The state highway passes through Uno and Rochelle on its way to Pratts, Virginia. SR 231 joins SR 230 on Orange Road northwest to US 29 (Seminole Trail). There, SR 230 turns south onto the four-lane divided highway while SR 231 turns north toward Madison. SR 231 and US 29 run concurrently to the southern end of US 29 Business, which SR 231 joins at a directional intersection. Access from southbound SR 231 to northbound US 29 and from southbound US 29 and northbound SR 231 is provided by SR 687 (Fairground Road). SR 231 and US 29 Business run concurrently on Main Street through the town of Madison. At the northern limit of the town, US 29 Business continues on Main Street to return to US 29 while SR 231 heads north on Blue Ridge Turnpike.

SR 231 crosses the Robinson River just south of the village of Banco, where Blue Ridge Turnpike continues northwest on SR 670 to the foot of the Blue Ridge Mountains while SR 231 veers north onto F.T. Valley Road. (N.B., F.T. stands for Francis Thornton, whose name was also applied to Thornton Gap west of Sperryville.) The state highway passes through the namesake valley in the foothills of the Blue Ridge, passing through the hamlet of Etlan directly east of Old Rag Mountain. SR 231 passes through Peola Mills as the highway enters Rappahannock County just north of its crossing of the Hughes River. The state highway crosses the upper reaches of the Hazel River and passes through Ashbys Corner before reaching its northern terminus at a wye junction with US 522 (Sperryville Pike) southeast of Sperryville.

== Major intersections ==
County	Location	mi	km	Destinations	Notes
Albemarle	Cismont	0.00	0.00	SR 22 (Louisa Road) – Shadwell, Louisa, Mineral	Southern terminus
Louisa	No major junctions				
Orange	Gordonsville	9.23	14.85	North High Street (SR 1006) - truck route to US 15 south / US 33 east	
Orange	Gordonsville	9.54	15.35	US 15 / US 33 east (Gordon Avenue / North Main Street) – Orange, Richmond, Exchange Hotel and Civil War Museum	Gordonsville Circle (traffic circle); south end of concurrency with US 33
Orange	Gordonsville	9.69	15.59	US 33 west (Spotswood Trail) – Harrisonburg, Barboursville Ruins	North end of concurrency with US 33
Orange	Old Somerset	15.80	25.43	SR 20 (Constitution Highway) – Barboursville, Orange	
Madison	Pratts	25.74	41.42	SR 230 east (Orange Road) / SR 687 (Fairground Road) – Orange	South end of concurrency with SR 230
Madison		26.38	42.45	US 29 south / SR 230 west (South Seminole Trail) – Charlottesville, Stanardsville	North end of concurrency with SR 230; south end of concurrency with US 29
Madison		27.72	44.61	US 29 north (Seminole Trail) – Culpeper, Washington	North end of concurrency with US 29; southern terminus of US 29 Bus. overlap; no direct access from southbound SR 231 to northbound US 29 or from southbound US 29 to northbound SR 231
Madison	Madison	28.71	46.20	SR 634 (Washington Street)	former SR 230 east
Madison	Madison	28.96	46.61	US 29 Bus. north (North Main Street) – Culpeper	North end of concurrency with US 29 Bus.
Madison	Banco	34.35	55.28	SR 670 (Old Blue Ridge Turnpike) – Criglersville, Syria, Graves Mountain, White Oak Canyon	former SR 231 north
Rappahannock	Revercombs Corner	42.28	68.04	SR 707 (Sharp Rock Road / Slate Mills Road) – Slate Mills	former SR 232 east
Rappahannock		44.66	71.87	SR 618 (Hawlin Road)	former SR 246 east
Rappahannock		49.82	80.18	US 522 (Sperryville Pike) – Sperryville, Culpeper, Shenandoah National Park, Skyline Drive, Luray Caverns	Northern terminus
1.000 mi = 1.609 km; 1.000 km = 0.621 mi: Concurrency terminus

< SR 700	District 7 State Routes; 1928–1933	SR 702 >
< SR 702	District 7 State Routes; 1928–1933	SR 704 >
