= Radiant, Virginia =

Unincorporated community in Virginia, United States

Coordinates: 38°18′48″N 78°12′26″W

Radiant is an unincorporated community located in Madison County, Virginia, United States.

A post office called Radiant has been in operation since 1895. It is unclear why the name "Radiant" was applied to this community.

Locust Grove Baptist Church is a historically Black church in Radiant. In 1974, the pastor was Rev. Major Gorham, and Mrs. Ruth Harris was clerk.
