= Brightwood, Virginia =

Census-designated place in Virginia, US

Coordinates: 38°25′17″N 78°11′37″W

Location in Madison County and the state of Virginia

Brightwood is a census-designated place (CDP) in Madison County, Virginia, United States. Its ZIP Code is 22715. The population as of the 2020 Census was 1,064.

== Demographics ==
Historical population
Census	Pop.	Note	%±
2010	1,001		—
2020	1,064		6.3%
U.S. Decennial Census; 2010 2020

Brightwood was first listed as a census designated place in the 2010 U.S. census.
