= Brightwood (film) =

2022 horror film

- Film poster
- Directed by: Dane Elcar
- Written by: Dane Elcar
- Based on: The Pond by Dane Elcar
- Starring: Dana Berger; Max Woertendyke
- Production companies: Noble Gas Media; Pond Pictures
- Distributed by: Cinephobia Releasing
- Release date: 4 December 2022 (Other Worlds Film Festival)
- Running time: 84 minutes
- Country: United States
- Language: English

Brightwood is a 2022 horror-thriller film written and directed by Dane Elcar, starring Dana Berger and Max Woertendyke. It is based on Elcar's 2018 short film The Pond.

== Premise ==
Jen and Dan, a bickering couple, find that there is seemingly no way out of the circular path around a pond in the woods.

== Cast ==
- Dana Berger as Jen
- Max Woertendyke as Dan

== Release ==
Brightwood premiered in the United States at the Other Worlds Film Festival on December 4, 2022.

=== Critical reception ===
On the review aggregator website Rotten Tomatoes, 94% of 33 critics' reviews are positive.

Catherine Bray of The Guardian gave the film 3 stars out of 5, calling it "a masterclass in what is achievable with hardly any money whatsoever", concluding that it is "intelligent, scrappy film-making that should lead to bigger things for both cast and crew." Richard Whittaker of The Austin Chronicle said that the film "turns [a] simple idea into a well-crafted baroque puzzle box." In a negative review, J. Kim Murphy of Variety wrote that the film occupies "an unflattering intersection of modest production resources and unrefined form."

== See also ==
- List of films featuring time loops
