= Brightwood (Hagerstown, Maryland) =

Historic house in Maryland

- U.S. National Register of Historic Places
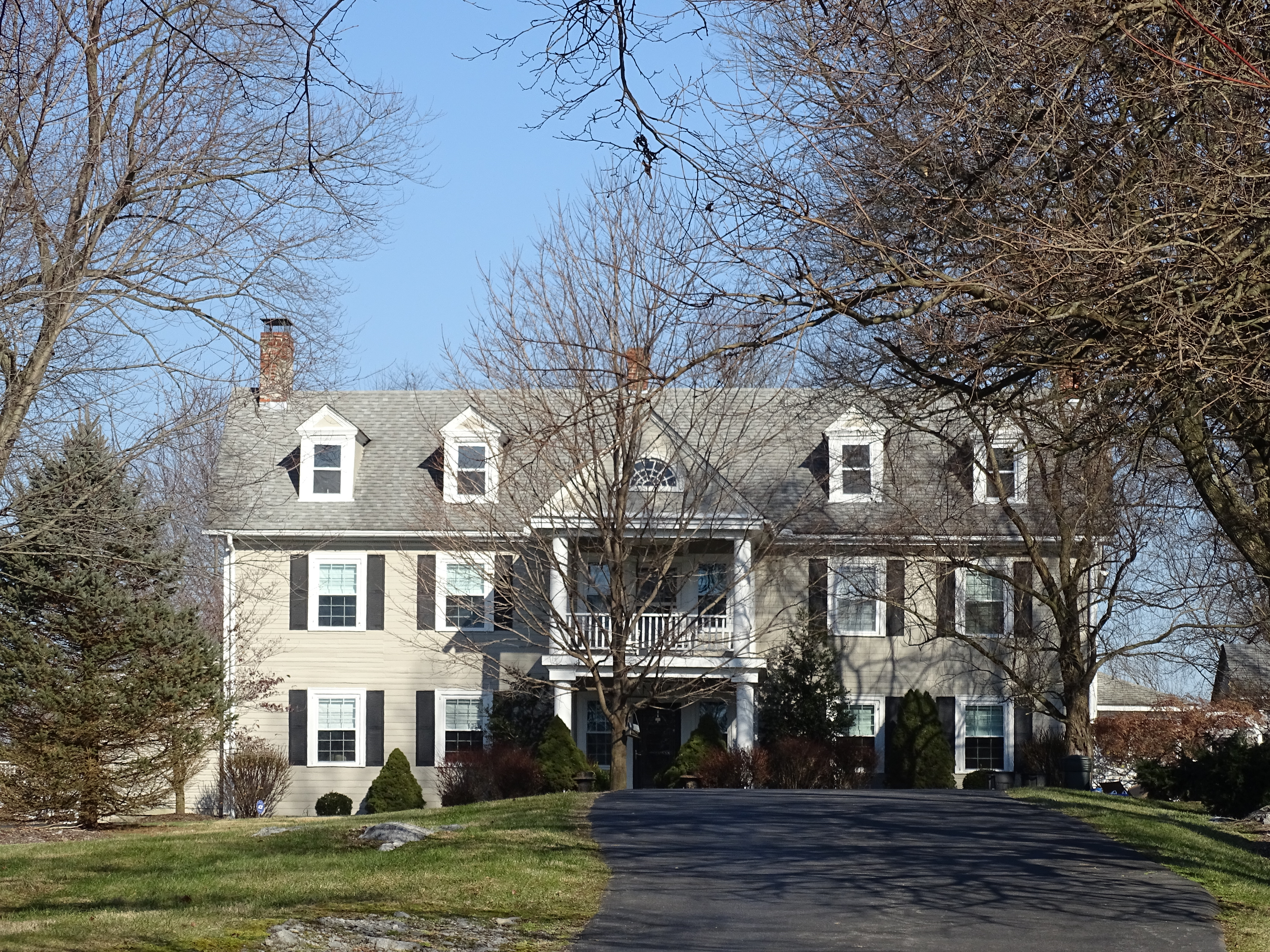

- Location within Maryland Location within the United States
- Nearest city: Hagerstown, Maryland
- Coordinates: 39°41′57.9″N 77°40′39.4″W
- Area: 63 acres (25 ha)
- Architectural style: Federal
- NRHP reference No.: 74000973
- Added to NRHP: July 30, 1974

Brightwood is a historic home near Hagerstown, Washington County, Maryland, United States. It is an unusually large, 2 1/2-story log-and-stone building with elaborately carved Adamesque features. It features a large two-story galleried portico that is centrally positioned on the front façade, and a one-room two-story tower is centrally positioned on the rear façade. Also on the property are a stone springhouse and a stone smokehouse.

It was listed on the National Register of Historic Places in 1974.
