= Graves Mill =

- U.S. National Register of Historic Places
- Virginia Landmarks Register
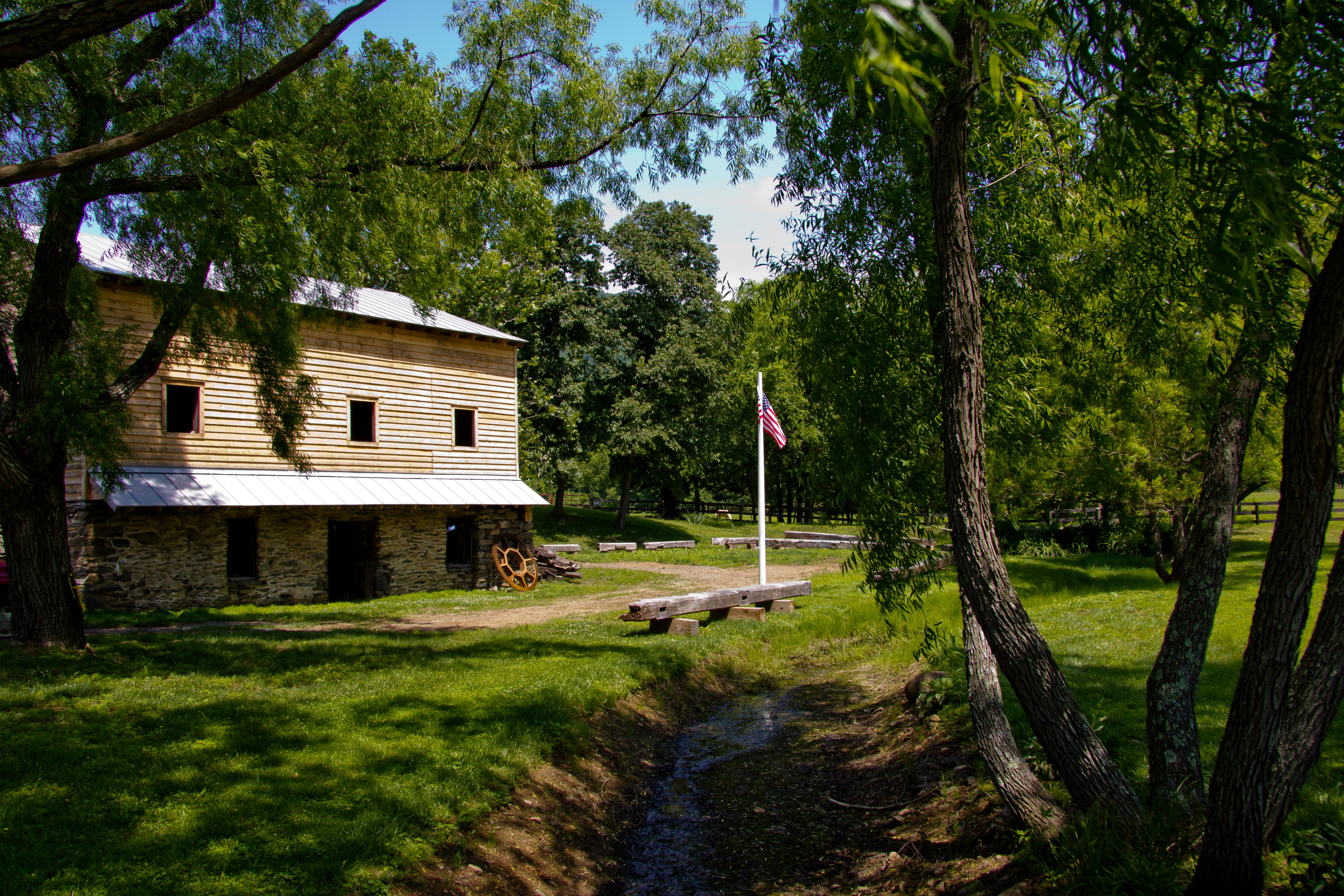

- Location within Virginia Location within the United States
- Location: 29 Graves Rd., near Wolftown, Virginia
- Coordinates: 38°25′28″N 78°22′3″W
- Area: 1.1 acres (0.45 ha)
- Built: c. 1745, c. 1798
- Built by: Jones, David; Graves, Thomas, & Sons
- NRHP reference No.: 06000754
- VLR No.: 056-0015

Significant dates
- Added to NRHP: August 30, 2006
- Designated VLR: June 8, 2006

Graves Mill, also known as Jones Mill and Beech Grove Mill, is a historic grist mill complex located near Wolftown, Madison County, Virginia. The complex includes a three-story, heavy timber frame gristmill; a two-story, log, frame, and weatherboard miller's house; and a one-story heavy timber frame barn. The gristmill was built about 1798, probably on the foundation of an earlier gristmill built about 1745. One of Thomas Graves' close friends was John Back, who was an expert millwright, and who lived about 15 miles away, along Meander Run. John Back made several repairs and improvements to the 1745 mill. When John Back was near the end of his life, he sold his 786 acres on Meander Run to Thomas Graves, with a "life estate," meaning he could continue to live there until he died. In his will, Mr. Graves left John Back's property to two of his sons, but a later codicil indicated it was to be sold to pay off his debts.

After Thomas Graves died, in 1801, his property, and his gristmill, near Wolftown was owned and operated by his descendants for more than a century.

It was listed on the National Register of Historic Places in 2006.
