= Frescati =

Frescati may refer to:

- Frescati (Ireland)
- Frescati (Stockholm)

Both places are named after Frascati in Italy. The identical corruption of Frascati in both cases is a coincidence.
