= Somerset, Virginia =

Unincorporated community in Virginia, United States

- Unincorporated community
- Location within Virginia Location within the United States
- Coordinates: 38°12′27″N 78°13′6″W
- Country: United States
- State: Virginia
- County: Orange
- Elevation: 430 ft (130 m)
- Time zone: UTC−5 (Eastern (EST))
  - Summer (DST): UTC−4 (EDT)
- GNIS feature ID: 1474822

Somerset is an unincorporated community in Orange County, Virginia, United States. It is the place where the roundabout at the former intersection of Virginia State Route 20 and Virginia State Route 231 is located.

Frascati and Tetley are listed on the National Register of Historic Places.

== Somerset Center Store Accident ==
On May 27, 2020, a tractor trailer crashed into the Somerset Center Store on the Southbound VA 231 section of the roundabout, which was a normal intersection at the time. The driver failed to stop and crashed into the building. The two people inside evacuated safely, but the building was destroyed.

== Climate ==
The climate in this area is characterized by hot, humid summers and generally mild to cool winters. According to the Köppen Climate Classification system, Somerset has a humid subtropical climate, abbreviated "Cfa" on climate maps.
