= Frascati (Somerset, Virginia) =

Historic house in Virginia, United States

- U.S. National Register of Historic Places
- Virginia Landmarks Register
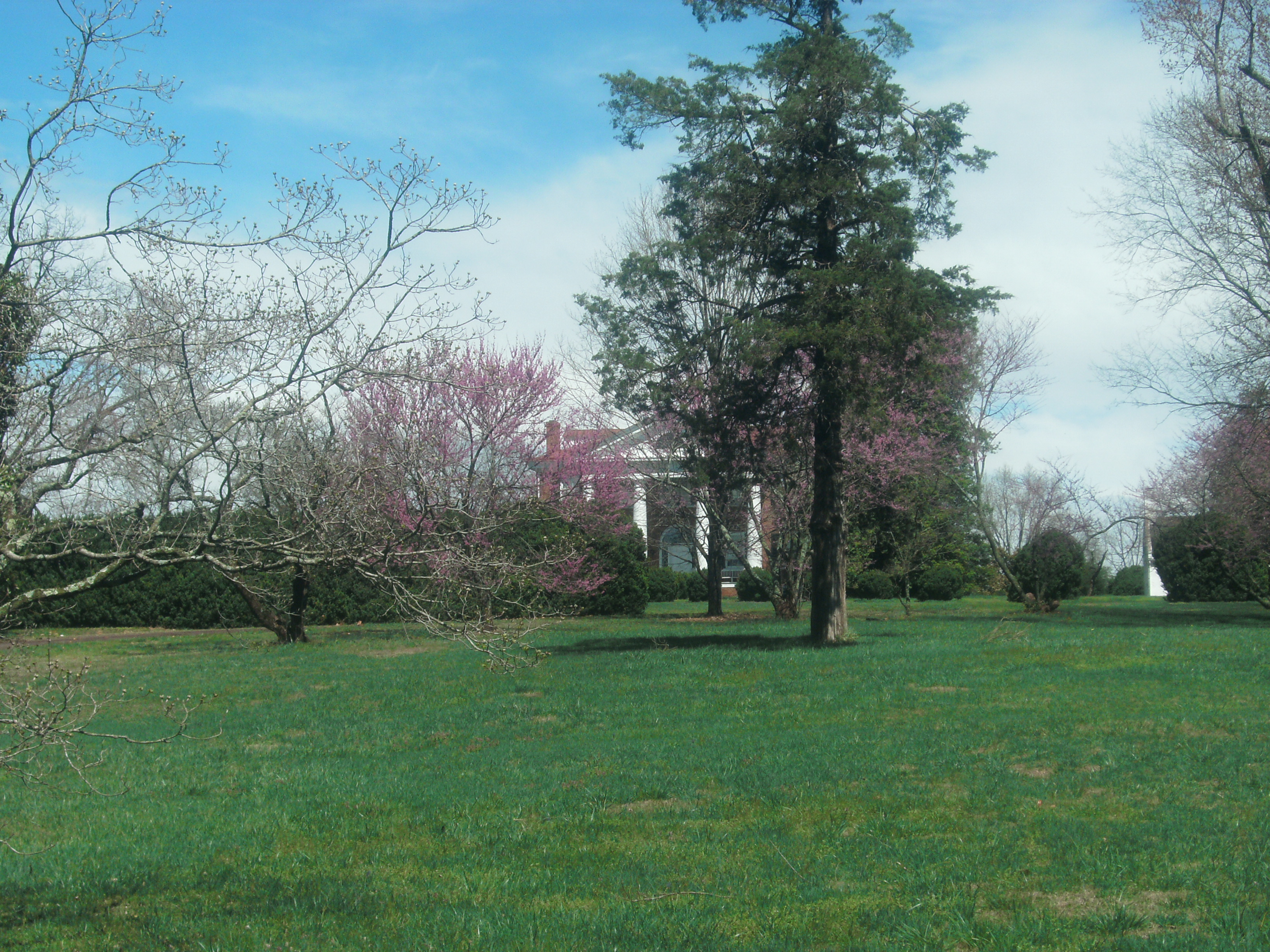
- Frascati, April 2017

- Location within Virginia
- Location: State Route 231, Somerset, Virginia
- Coordinates: 38°11′33″N 78°12′43″W
- Area: 25 acres (10 ha)
- Built: 1821–1823
- Architect: John M. Perry
- Architectural style: Federal, Georgian
- NRHP reference No.: 82004579
- VLR No.: 068-0014

Significant dates
- Added to NRHP: June 28, 1982
- Designated VLR: September 16, 1980

Frascati is an early 19th-century Federal-style plantation house near Somerset in Orange County, Virginia. Frascati was the residence of Philip P. Barbour, Associate Justice of the Supreme Court of the United States and statesman.

== History ==
Frascati was built between 1821 and 1823 for Philip P. Barbour, Associate Justice of the Supreme Court of the United States and statesman. Barbour's father, Thomas Barbour arrived in Orange County as a young man from Culpeper County. In 1806, Thomas Barbour and his wife, Mary, sold their home tract of 885 acres (3.58 km^{2}) to their son, Philip. Barbour entered into his "Articles of Agreement" with master builder John M. Perry on 7 November 1821. Barbour was familiar with Perry's capabilities through his work at the University of Virginia and was attracted to Somerset, the home of his neighbor, Thomas Macon. Like Somerset, Frascati was influenced by the more conventional, central hall Federal house style. This conventional format contrasted with the tastes of Barbour's brother, Senator James Barbour of Barboursville. Barboursville was designed by Thomas Jefferson in 1822 and displayed Jefferson's mixing of French and Palladian forms similar to that at Monticello.

Frascati was Barbour's home until his death in 1841. Barbour's wife sold the estate in 1848 to Captain James Magruder, another local builder who had worked under Jefferson on the University of Virginia. Frascati was then long the home of Mrs. William H. Lyne, followed by Mr. A. D. Irving, a distant relation to Washington Irving. The residence is now owned by the Barrow family, who have preserved its farm setting.

Frascati was added to the Virginia Landmarks Register on 16 September 1980 and listed on the National Register of Historic Places on 28 June 1982.

== Architecture ==
Frascati is one of the Piedmont's best-documented 19th-century dwellings. The original building contract is preserved in the collections of the Virginia Historical Society and called for "exterior walls of the whole house to be faced with rubber stretchers well burned..." with the brickwork also "to be equal to any... at the University of Virginia." It was designed by John M. Perry of nearby Albemarle County, Virginia. Perry was one of the master builders employed by Thomas Jefferson both at Monticello and the University of Virginia. Frascati's Tuscan portico and classical detailing are Jeffersonian architectural characteristics.

The 57' x 39' structure is executed in very even Flemish-bond brick with tooled penciled joints. Frascati's shallow hipped roof covers the two-story, double-pile residence. Frascati's main entrance has paneled double doors set within a frame containing a large semicircular transom and complementing sidelights all encircled with elaborately patterned wooden tracery. The frame consists of symmetrical architraves with paneled corner blocks. The main entrance is sheltered by a tetrastyle, pedimented Tuscan portico on a brick podium. Frascati's Tuscan portico has stuccoed columns, a full entablature, and a pediment with a semicircular lunette in the tympanum.

Fenestration throughout Frascati consists of six-over-six sash windows set in wooden architraves and flanked by original louvered shutters. Paired interior-end chimneys are located on Frascati's north and south elevations. A later semi-exterior chimney is found on the home's rear elevation. The roof is covered with standing-seam sheet metal.

Frascati's central hall plan and interior are discussed at some length in the original specifications:

The house to have a passage through the middle of it ten feet wide in the clear; and to have a cross partition wall so as to divide the floors of each story into four rooms besides the passage; both the passage walls and cross walls to go from the foundation to the top to be of brick and of the same thickness in the several stories as in the outer walls; the whole house bapement story and all, to be well plaistered with a due preportion of plaister of Paris.... The drawing room and passage each to have a handsome cornice of plaister, and each a handsome center ornament of plaister in the ceiling; the general style of all the wood work to be like Thomas Macon's dwelling house... there are to be two staircases one private from the dining room and chamber, with a closet under it; the other an elegant ornamental one out of the passage....

The parlor exhibits plasterwork ceiling medallions and entablatures, the latter copied from a design in Asher Benjamin's American Builder's Companion (1806). Surviving on the Frascati estate grounds are the original kitchen outbuilding and remnants of the extensive original gardens.
