= Wolftown, Virginia =

Unincorporated community in Virginia, United States

Coordinates: 38°21′20″N 78°20′51″W

Wolftown is an unincorporated community located in Madison County, Virginia, United States. It is located just east of Shenandoah National Park.

== History ==
Wolftown was named for the wolves that used to drink from the town's spring.

Around 1745, a grist mill was built, and then about fifty years later, around 1798, a new grist mill on top of the original foundation. It was owned and operated by members of the Thomas Graves family for more than a century.

Graves Mill and the Hoffman Round Barn are listed on the National Register of Historic Places.

In 1871, Traverse B. Pinn testified about threats he received during election campaigning, including those in Wolftown.

In 1995, area residents sought Wolftown Mercantile Country Store when record rains fell on Madison County, causing floods and landslides that destroyed roads, bridges, and buildlings. The owner of the store, John McElheney distributed thousands of gallons of water.
