= Madison County, Virginia =

County in Virginia, United States

- County
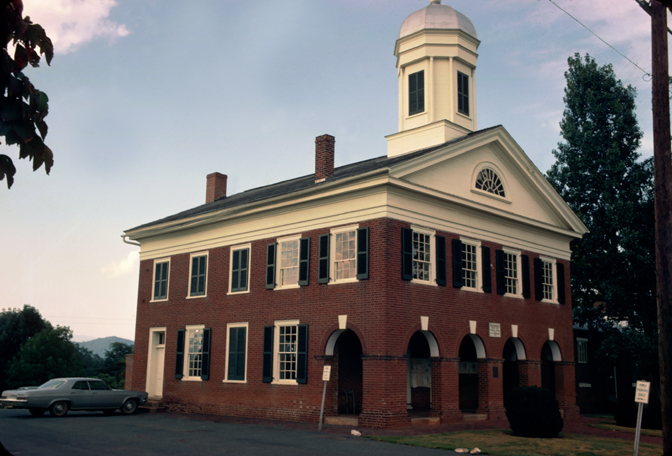
- Madison County Courthouse, built 1829

- Location within the U.S. state of Virginia
- Coordinates: 38.41°N 78.28°W
- Country: United States
- State: Virginia
- Founded: 1792
- Named for: James Madison
- Seat: Madison
- Largest town: Madison

Area
  - Total: 322 sq mi (830 km^{2})
  - Land: 321 sq mi (830 km^{2})
  - Water: 1.2 sq mi (3.1 km^{2}) 0.4%

Population (2020)
  - Total: 13,837
  - Estimate (2025): 14,237 ▲
  - Density: 43.1/sq mi (16.6/km^{2})
- Time zone: UTC−5 (Eastern)
  - Summer (DST): UTC−4 (EDT)
- Congressional district: 7th
- Website: www.madisonco.virginia.gov

Madison County is a county located in the Commonwealth of Virginia. As of the 2020 census, the population was 13,837. Its county seat is Madison.

== History ==
Madison County was established in December 1792, created from Culpeper County. The county is named for the Madison family that owned land along the Rapidan River. President James Madison is a descendant of that family.

One of Madison County's most well-known residents was John Hoffman (1692-1772). He lived along the Robinson River, where he owned 3,525 acres. He established the Hebron Lutheran Church on his property, which is still in use today. He had five children with his first wife, Anna Haeger; and 12 children with his second wife, Maria Sabina Folg. Two of his daughters, Margaret Hoffman and Elizabeth Hoffman, married two brothers, John Back and Henry Back, who were the sons of his neighbor, John Henry Back. After Margaret and Elizabeth became widows, they moved to nearby Rockingham County, where they lived out the rest of their lives along Wolf Run, and were buried there. John and Henry Back's other brother, Joseph Back, married Elizabeth Hoffman-Maggard; they migrated to southeastern Kentucky in 1791 and founded the Bach (Back) family there. This has been documented in many books, including The Bach (Back) Family from Southeastern Kentucky by Dr. Mary Back Simpson,

== Geography ==

According to the U.S. Census Bureau, the county has a total area of 322 square miles (830 km^{2}), of which 321 square miles (830 km^{2}) is land and 1.2 square miles (3.1 km^{2}) (0.4%) is water.

A significant portion of western Madison County is within Shenandoah National Park, including Hawksbill Mountain, the highest point in both the park and in Madison County, Old Rag Mountain, one of the park's most popular tourist destinations, and Rapidan Camp, the presidential retreat built by Herbert Hoover. Hoover's Camp was built between 1929 and 1932. The camp consisted of 13 buildings with the main one being "The Brown House". In 2017, only three of these houses are still standing (The Brown House, The Prime Minister Cabin, and The Creel). The camp was built where two streams merge to form the Rapidan River because fishing was Hoover's favorite pastime. Hoover even made sure that the camp was built at an elevation where mosquitos would not be a nuisance while fishing. The camp was donated to the Commonwealth of Virginia in 1932 so other presidents could use it and in December 1935 it officially became a part of Shenandoah National Park.

=== Adjacent counties ===
- Page County – northwest
- Rappahannock County – north
- Culpeper County – east
- Orange County – southeast
- Greene County – southwest

=== National protected area ===
- Shenandoah National Park (part)

=== Major highways ===
- US 15
- US 29
- SR 230
- SR 231

== Demographics ==
Historical population
Census	Pop.	Note	%±
1800	8,322		—
1810	8,381		0.7%
1820	8,490		1.3%
1830	9,236		8.8%
1840	8,107		−12.2%
1850	9,331		15.1%
1860	8,854		−5.1%
1870	8,670		−2.1%
1880	10,562		21.8%
1890	10,225		−3.2%
1900	10,216		−0.1%
1910	10,055		−1.6%
1920	9,595		−4.6%
1930	8,952		−6.7%
1940	8,465		−5.4%
1950	8,273		−2.3%
1960	8,187		−1.0%
1970	8,638		5.5%
1980	10,232		18.5%
1990	11,949		16.8%
2000	12,520		4.8%
2010	13,308		6.3%
2020	13,837		4.0%
2025 (est.)	14,237	▲	2.9%
U.S. Decennial Census; 1790–1960 1900–1990; 1990–2000 2010 2020

=== Racial and ethnic composition ===
Madison County, Virginia – Racial and ethnic composition Note: the US Census treats Hispanic/Latino as an ethnic category. This table excludes Latinos from the racial categories and assigns them to a separate category. Hispanics/Latinos may be of any race.
Race / Ethnicity (NH = Non-Hispanic)	Pop 1980	Pop 1990	Pop 2000	Pop 2010	Pop 2020	% 1980	% 1990	% 2000	% 2010	% 2020
White alone (NH)	8,280	10,156	10,800	11,394	11,563	80.92%	84.99%	86.26%	85.62%	83.57%
Black or African American alone (NH)	1,805	1,697	1,423	1,292	1,056	17.64%	14.20%	11.37%	9.71%	7.63%
Native American or Alaska Native alone (NH)	7	29	17	22	14	0.07%	0.24%	0.14%	0.17%	0.10%
Asian alone (NH)	7	22	63	74	86	0.07%	0.18%	0.50%	0.56%	0.62%
Native Hawaiian or Pacific Islander alone (NH)	x	x	3	4	1	x	x	0.02%	0.03%	0.01%
Other race alone (NH)	14	10	11	10	53	0.14%	0.08%	0.09%	0.08%	0.38%
Mixed race or Multiracial (NH)	x	x	107	276	623	x	x	0.85%	2.07%	4.50%
Hispanic or Latino (any race)	119	35	96	236	441	1.16%	0.29%	0.77%	1.77%	3.19%
Total	10,232	11,949	12,520	13,308	13,837	100.00%	100.00%	100.00%	100.00%	100.00%

=== 2020 census ===
As of the 2020 census, the county had a population of 13,837. The median age was 45.8 years. 21.1% of residents were under the age of 18 and 22.2% of residents were 65 years of age or older. For every 100 females there were 95.5 males, and for every 100 females age 18 and over there were 93.2 males age 18 and over.

0.0% of residents lived in urban areas, while 100.0% lived in rural areas.

There were 5,317 households in the county, of which 28.6% had children under the age of 18 living with them and 22.2% had a female householder with no spouse or partner present. About 22.8% of all households were made up of individuals and 11.8% had someone living alone who was 65 years of age or older.

There were 6,051 housing units, of which 12.1% were vacant. Among occupied housing units, 77.2% were owner-occupied and 22.8% were renter-occupied. The homeowner vacancy rate was 1.9% and the rental vacancy rate was 3.9%.

=== 2000 Census ===
As of the census of 2000, there were 12,520 people, 4,739 households, and 3,521 families residing in the county. The population density was 39 people per square mile (15 people/km^{2}). There were 5,239 housing units at an average density of 16 units per square mile (6.2 units/km^{2}). The racial makeup of the county was 86.71% White, 11.41% Black or African American, 0.14% Native American, 0.50% Asian, 0.02% Pacific Islander, 0.29% from other races, and 0.93% from two or more races. 0.77% of the population were Hispanic or Latino of any race.

There were 4,739 households, out of which 30.90% had children under the age of 18 living with them, 61.40% were married couples living together, 8.80% had a female householder with no husband present, and 25.70% were non-families. 21.80% of all households were made up of individuals, and 9.50% had someone living alone who was 65 years of age or older. The average household size was 2.60 and the average family size was 3.03.

In the county, the population was spread out, with 24.10% under the age of 18, 6.90% from 18 to 24, 27.60% from 25 to 44, 26.40% from 45 to 64, and 15.00% who were 65 years of age or older. The median age was 40 years. For every 100 females there were 95.00 males. For every 100 females aged 18 and over, there were 94.60 males.

The median income for a household in the county was $39,856, and the median income for a family was $44,857. Males had a median income of $30,805 versus $24,384 for females. The per capita income for the county was $18,636. About 6.90% of families and 9.60% of the population were below the poverty line, including 12.70% of those under age 18 and 10.20% of those age 65 or over.

== Communities ==
=== Towns ===
- Madison

=== Census-designated place ===
- Brightwood

=== Other unincorporated communities ===
- Aroda
- Aylor
- Banco
- Beaver Park
- Big Meadows
- Burnt Tree
- Criglersville
- Decapolis
- Duet
- Elly
- Etlan
- Five Forks
- Fletcher
- Fordsville
- Graves Mill
- Haywood
- Hood
- Kinderhook
- Leon
- Locust Dale
- Madison Mills
- Nethers
- Novum
- O'Neal
- Oakpark
- Oldrag
- Pratts
- Radiant
- Repton Mills
- Rochelle
- Ruth
- Shelby
- Syria
- Tanners
- Tryme
- Twyman's Mill
- Uno
- Waylandsburg
- Wolftown
- Zeus

== Politics ==
Madison County is a Republican stronghold and has not voted for a Democratic presidential nominee since 1940.

United States presidential election results for Madison County, Virginia
Year	Republican		Democratic		Third party(ies)	
Year	No.	%	No.	%	No.	%
1912	210	31.02%	402	59.38%	65	9.60%
1916	348	37.50%	572	61.64%	8	0.86%
1920	431	45.80%	499	53.03%	11	1.17%
1924	347	35.74%	589	60.66%	35	3.60%
1928	772	57.10%	580	42.90%	0	0.00%
1932	522	37.83%	849	61.52%	9	0.65%
1936	662	45.13%	804	54.81%	1	0.07%
1940	646	48.14%	692	51.56%	4	0.30%
1944	811	56.79%	616	43.14%	1	0.07%
1948	662	55.72%	428	36.03%	98	8.25%
1952	1,012	64.96%	540	34.66%	6	0.39%
1956	850	56.86%	533	35.65%	112	7.49%
1960	998	60.38%	636	38.48%	19	1.15%
1964	1,060	55.12%	862	44.83%	1	0.05%
1968	1,188	48.71%	478	19.60%	773	31.69%
1972	1,864	73.41%	639	25.17%	36	1.42%
1976	1,710	52.97%	1,466	45.42%	52	1.61%
1980	1,959	55.64%	1,351	38.37%	211	5.99%
1984	2,723	67.15%	1,302	32.11%	30	0.74%
1988	2,501	62.12%	1,427	35.44%	98	2.43%
1992	2,341	48.99%	1,700	35.57%	738	15.44%
1996	2,296	50.91%	1,734	38.45%	480	10.64%
2000	2,940	58.48%	1,844	36.68%	243	4.83%
2004	3,556	61.61%	2,176	37.70%	40	0.69%
2008	3,758	56.10%	2,862	42.72%	79	1.18%
2012	3,869	58.50%	2,639	39.90%	106	1.60%
2016	4,419	63.32%	2,203	31.57%	357	5.12%
2020	5,300	65.20%	2,698	33.19%	131	1.61%
2024	5,671	66.88%	2,700	31.84%	109	1.29%

== Education ==
Madison County Public Schools has around 2000 students in four schools. Madison Primary School has grades K–2 and has around 370 students. Waverly Yowell Elementary School has grades 3–5 and around 410 students. William Wetsel Middle School has grades 6–8 and around 415 students. Madison County High School has grades 9–12 and has around 665 students. All statistics based on 2007–2008 VA DOE statistics. It is also home to Woodberry Forest School, a private, all-male boarding school.

=== Censorship ===
In January 2023, the Madison County School Board banned 21 books from the high school library, including books by Stephen King, Toni Morrison, and Anne Rice.

=== Madison County High School ===
Madison County High School is the county's only High School. Grades 9–12 attend MCHS. The total number of students at MCHS was 584 for 2013–2014. Madison County's nickname is the Mountaineers and have two main logos. One is an inked drawing of a Mountaineer standing on a mountain. In the background, a caravan of people and covered wagons can be seen being led by the Mountaineer. The second main logo is a "M" with a "C" offset and connected to it standing for Madison County, the name of both the county and high school. The colors are blue and white. MCHS fields athletic teams in football, basketball, soccer, volleyball, wrestling, track, cross country, golf, baseball and softball. Swimming was added as a sport in 2011. Cheerleading teams are also fielded for football and basketball games. Madison is home to the 2012 Group A, Division 1 state champions in Forensics.

MCHS offers AP courses and dual enrollment courses through Germanna Community College. MCHS has full accreditation from the Virginia Department of Education with Virginia Standards of Learning passing rates ranging from 94 percent on the history to 86 percent on the science. MCHS graduates more than 90% of its students per year.

=== William H. Wetsel Middle School ===
William H. Wetsel Middle School was opened in August 1993 under the leadership of Principal, John Anderson. Grades 6 and 7 were moved from Waverly Yowell Elementary School and Grade 8 was removed from Madison County High School to form a Grades 6-8 middle school. William Wetsel, the school's namesake, was a former agriculture teacher and superintendent in Madison County.

== See also ==
- National Register of Historic Places listings in Madison County, Virginia
