= Hogback Mountain =

Hogback Mountain may refer to several places:

== Canada ==
- Hogback Mountain (British Columbia), a mountain in the Camelsfoot Range
- Hogback Mountain (Nunavut)

== United States ==
- Hogback Mountain (Lewis and Clark County, Montana), List of mountains in Lewis and Clark County, Montana
- Hogback Mountain (Madison County, Montana), List of mountains in Madison County, Montana
- Hogback Mountain (Marquette County, Michigan)
- Hogback Mountain (Klamath County, Oregon)
- Hogback Mountain (Vermont)
- Hogback Mountain (Loudoun County, Virginia)
- Hogback Mountain (Shenandoah National Park, Virginia)

== See also ==
- Hogback (disambiguation)
