= Hogback =

Hogback may refer to:

- Grand Hogback, geological formation in northwestern Colorado
- Hogback (sculpture), Anglo-Scandinavian stone tomb markers found in the British Isles
- Hogback (geology), one of a number of topographic features (landforms) created by the erosion of tilted strata
- Hogback Hills, a recreation area straddling Genesee County and Lapeer County, Michigan
- Hogback Mountain (disambiguation), the name of many mountains in the United States and Canada
- Hogback (New York), a summit in Schoharie County, New York
- Hogback Ridge, a summit in Alaska
- Hogback Ridge, an early name for Mount Oread, Kansas
- Doctor Hogback, a character in the anime and manga One Piece, who lives on Thriller Bark

== See also ==
- Hogs Back (disambiguation), including uses of Hogsback
