= Hogs Back =

Hogs Back or Hogsback may refer to:

- The Hog's Back, a hilly ridge in Surrey, England
- Hogs Back Brewery, a brewery in Surrey, England (named after the ridge)
- Hog's Back Falls, a series of artificial falls on the Rideau River, Ottawa, Canada
- Hog's Back Road, a road in Ottawa, Canada
- Hogsback, Eastern Cape, a village in South Africa
- Hogsback Frog, a species of frog endemic to South Africa
- The Hogs Back, a ridge in the Adirondack Mountains in New York, US
- Hogback Mountain (Klamath County, Oregon) or Hogsback Mountain, Oregon, US
- Hogsback, a snow ridge on the Coalman Glacier, Mount Hood, Oregon, US

== See also ==
- Hogback (disambiguation)
