= List of amphibians of Shenandoah National Park =

This is a list of the amphibians that occur in the Shenandoah National Park in the Blue Ridge Mountains of western Virginia.

- Abundant refers to species that may be seen daily in its suitable habitat and season, and counted in relatively large numbers.
- Common denotes species that may be seen daily in its suitable habitat and season, but not in large numbers.
- Uncommon means a species is likely to be seen only monthly in its appropriate season and habitat, though it may be locally common.
- Rare refers to a species that is only seen a few times each year.
- Unknown is used when abundance has not been assessed.

Mole Salamanders (Ambystomatidae)
Common name	Genus and species	Abundance	Picture
Jefferson salamander	Ambystoma jeffersonianum	Uncommon	
Spotted salamander	Ambystoma maculatum	Uncommon	
True Toads (Bufonidae)
American toad	Bufo americanus	Common	
Fowler's toad	Bufo fowleri	Rare	
Tree Frogs (Hylidae)
Northern cricket frog	Acris crepitans	Uncommon	
Gray tree frog	Hyla versicolor	Uncommon	
Spring peeper	Pseudacris crucifer	Uncommon	
Upland chorus frog	Pseudacris triseriata feriarum	Uncommon	
Lungless Salamanders (Plethodontidae)
Northern dusky salamander	Desmognathus fuscus	Abundant	
Seal salamander	Desmognathus monticola	Common	
Northern two-lined salamander	Eurycea bislineata	Abundant	
Three-lined salamander	Eurycea longicauda guttolineata	Unknown	
Longtail salamander	Eurycea longicauda longicauda	Rare	
Spring salamander	Gyrinophilus porphyriticus	Uncommon	
Four-toed salamander	Hemidactylium scutatum	Rare	
Red-backed salamander	Plethodon cinereus	Abundant	
White-spotted slimy salamander	Plethodon cylindraceus	Unknown	
Shenandoah salamander	Plethodon shenandoah	Unknown (Endemic)	
True Frogs (Ranidae)
American bullfrog	Rana catesbeiana	Uncommon	
Green frog	Rana clamitans	Common	
Pickerel frog	Rana palustris	Common	
Wood frog	Rana sylvatica	Uncommon	
True Salamanders and Newts (Salamandridae)
Eastern newt	Notophthalmus viridescens	Uncommon	
