= Hogback (New York) =

Mountain in New York State

- Location within New York Adirondack Park Location within the United States

Highest point
- Elevation: 1,276 feet (389 m)
- Coordinates: 42°42′23″N 74°27′54″W

Geography
- Location: NE of Cobleskill, New York, U.S.
- Topo map: USGS Cobleskill

Hogback is a mountain in Schoharie County, New York. It is located northeast of Cobleskill. Barrack Zourie is located northwest and Mount Shank is located southwest of Hogback.
