= Dark Hollow Falls =

Waterfall in Virginia, United States

Coordinates: 38°31′8.45″N 78°25′24.02″W

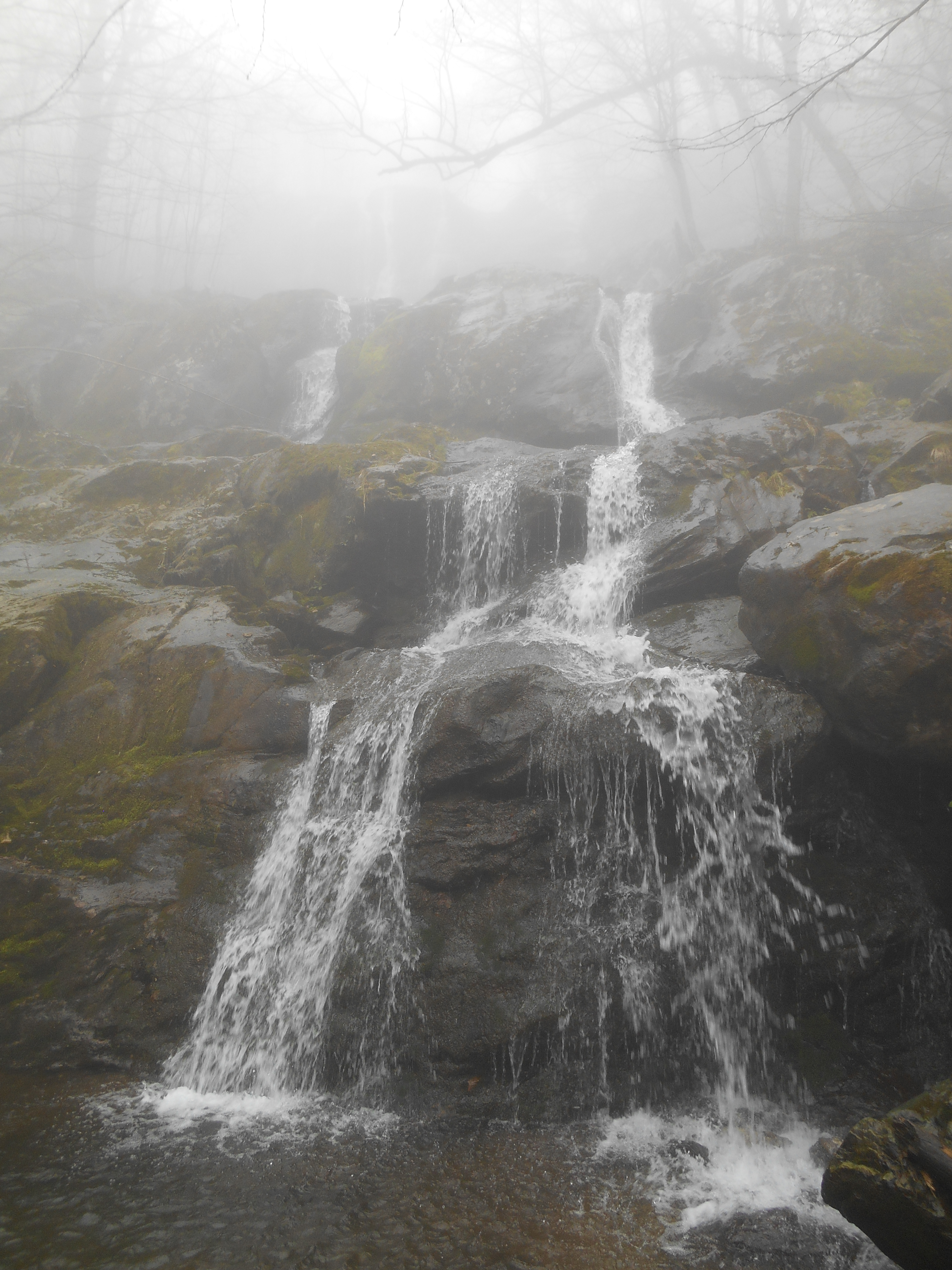
Dark Hollow Falls in the fog

Dark Hollow Falls is a waterfall in Shenandoah National Park in the US state of Virginia. It is the closest waterfall to Skyline Drive and is the most-traveled trail in the park. The falls are at an elevation of 3,429 feet and cascade 70 feet. The trail is a 1.4-mile loop from the parking lot on Skyline Drive.

== Gallery ==
Upper Dark Hollow Falls

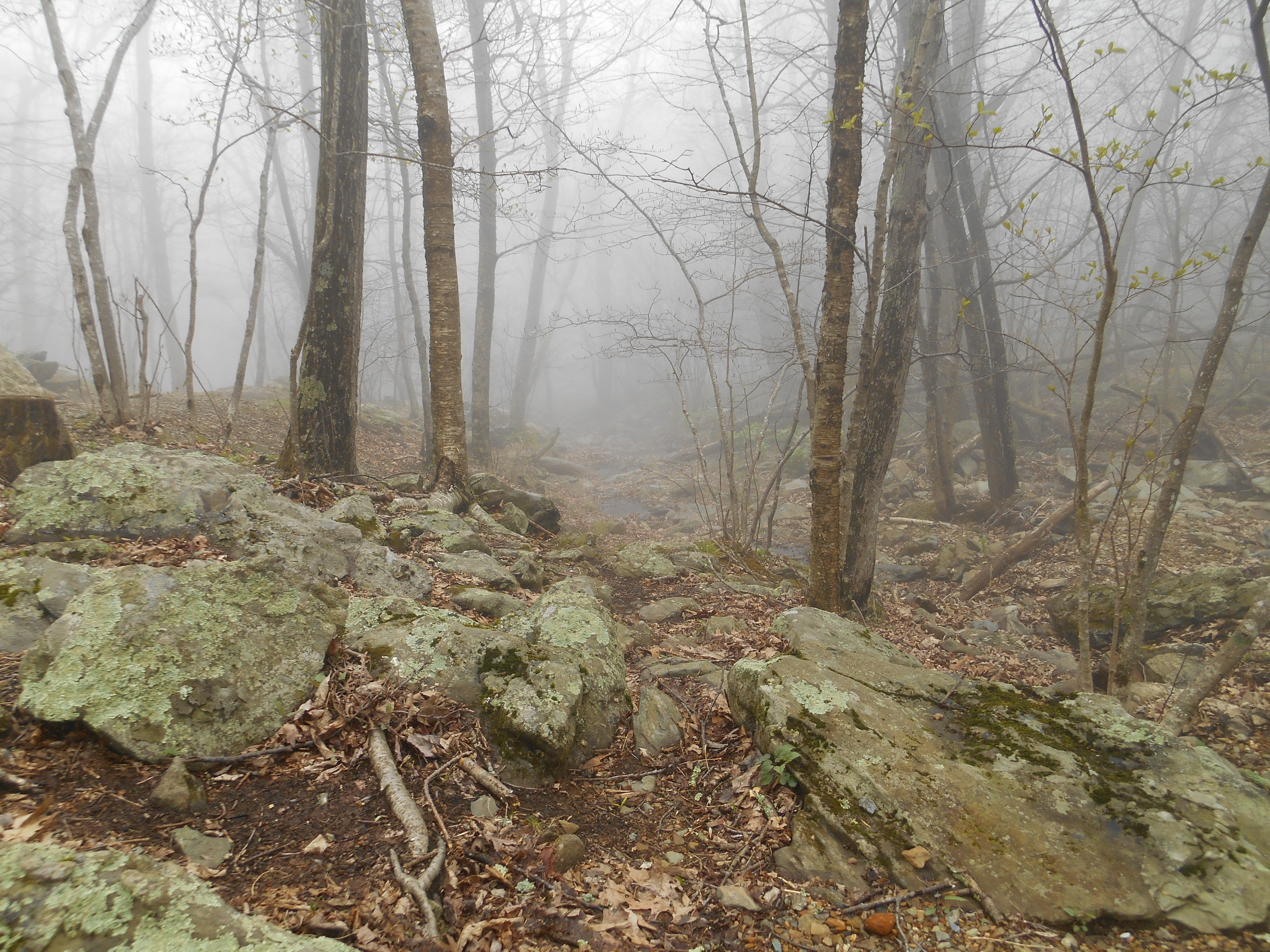
Part of the hiking trail to Dark Hollow Falls

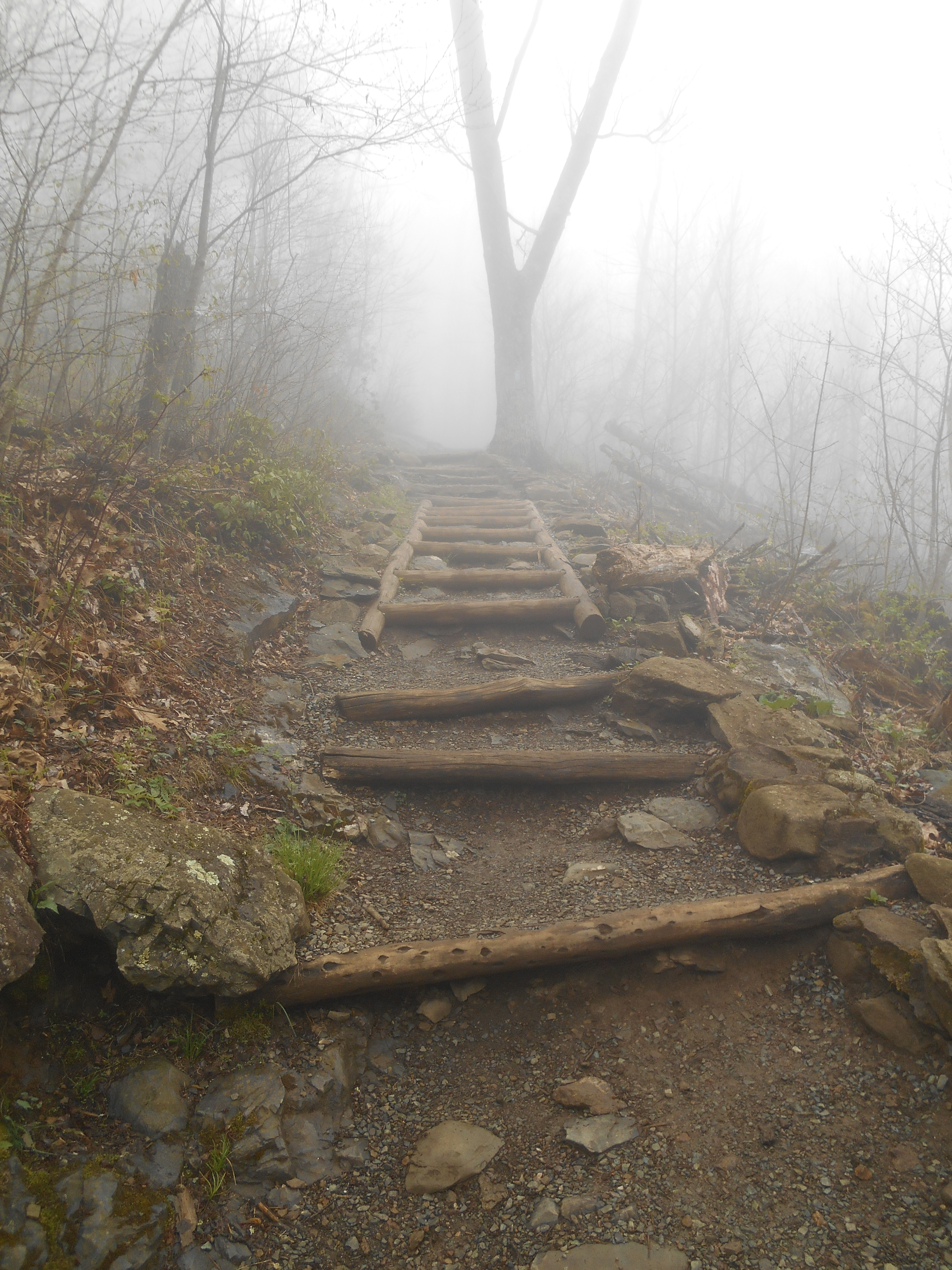
Part of the hiking trail to Dark Hollow Falls

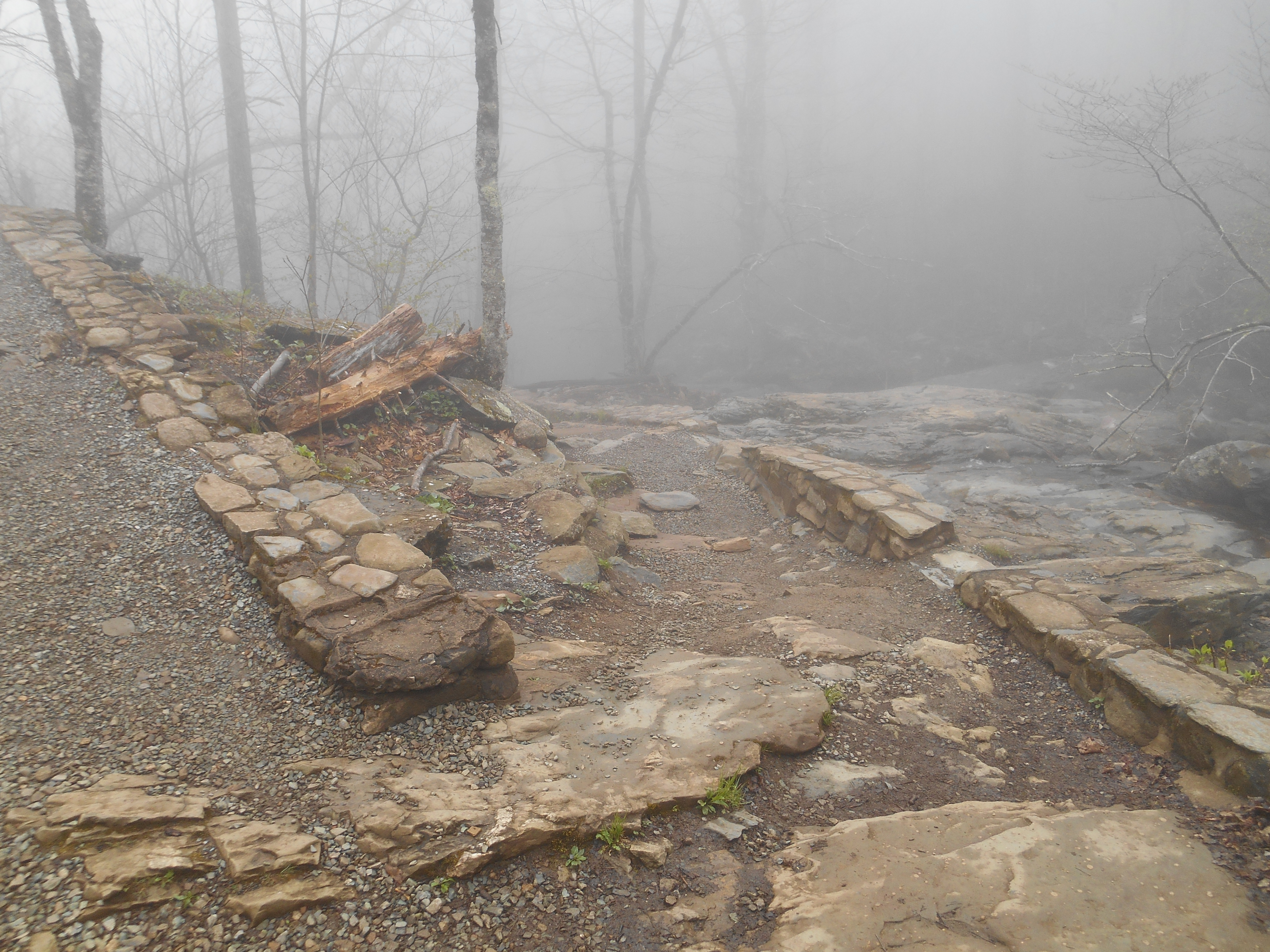
Part of the hiking trail to Dark Hollow Falls
