= Barrack Zourie =

Mountain in New York, United States

- Location within New York Adirondack Park Location within the United States

Highest point
- Elevation: 1,811 feet (552 m)
- Coordinates: 42°43′31″N 74°29′25″W

Geography
- Location: N of Cobleskill, New York, U.S.
- Topo map: USGS Cobleskill

Barrack Zourie is a mountain in Schoharie County, New York. It is located north of Cobleskill. Pine Hill is located west-northwest and Mount Shank is located south-southwest of Barrack Zourie.

The mountain contains a cave system that is 5.2 kilometres (3.2 mi) long, making it one of the longest known in the northeastern portion of the Helderberg Plateau. It was first scientifically theorized to exist in the 1970s, and an opening was dug in the 1990s.
