= Warnerville Hill =

Mountain in New York, United States

- Location within New York Adirondack Park Location within the United States

Highest point
- Elevation: 1,988 feet (606 m)
- Coordinates: 42°38′39″N 74°28′29″W

Geography
- Location: SSE of Cobleskill, New York, U.S.
- Topo map: USGS Cobleskill

Warnerville Hill is a mountain in Schoharie County, New York. It is located south-southeast of Cobleskill. Donats Mountain is located north and Petersburg Mountain is located southeast of Warnerville Hill.
