= List of birds of Shenandoah National Park =

This is a comprehensive listing of the bird species recorded in Shenandoah National Park, which is in the U.S. state of Virginia. Unless otherwise noted, this list is based on one published by the National Park Service (NPS). The list contains 196 species when taxonomic changes have been made.

This list is presented in the taxonomic sequence of the Check-list of North and Middle American Birds, 7th edition through the 66th Supplement, published by the American Ornithological Society (AOS). Common and scientific names are also those of the Check-list, except that the common names of families are from the Clements taxonomy because the AOS list does not include them.

The following tags are used to highlight the abundance of some species. Species without tags are common to abundant residents, migrants, or seasonal visitors.

- (Uc) Uncommon - "Likely to be seen monthly in appropriate habitat and season. May be locally common" per the NPS (52 species)
- (R) Rare - "Present, but usually seen only a few times each year" per the NPS (30 species)
- (O) Occasional - "Occurs in the park at least once every few years, varying in numbers, but not necessarily every year" per the NPS (63 species)
- (I) Introduced - a species introduced to North America by the actions of man, either directly or indirectly (4 species)

== Ducks, geese, and waterfowl ==
Order: Anseriformes Family: Anatidae

The family Anatidae includes the ducks and most duck-like waterfowl, such as geese and swans. These birds are adapted to an aquatic existence with webbed feet, bills which are flattened to a greater or lesser extent, and feathers that are excellent at shedding water due to special oils.

- Canada goose, Branta canadensis (O)
- Tundra swan, Cygnus columbianus (O)
- Wood duck, Aix sponsa (Uc)
- Blue-winged teal, Spatula discors (O)
- Mallard, Anas platyrhynchos (O)
- American black duck, Anas rubripes (O)
- Green-winged teal, Anas crecca (O)

== New World quail ==
Order: Galliformes Family: Odontophoridae

The New World quails are small, plump terrestrial birds only distantly related to the quails of the Old World, but named for their similar appearance and habits.

- Northern bobwhite, Colinus virginianus (R)

== Pheasants, grouse, and allies ==
Order: Galliformes Family: Phasianidae

Phasianidae consists of the pheasants and their allies. These are terrestrial species, variable in size but generally plump with broad relatively short wings. Many species are gamebirds or have been domesticated as a food source for humans.

- Wild turkey, Meleagris gallopavo (O)
- Ruffed grouse, Bonasa umbellus (O)
- Ring-necked pheasant, Phasianus colchicus (I) (O)

== Grebes ==
Order: Podicipediformes Family: Podicipedidae

Grebes are small to medium-large freshwater diving birds. They have lobed toes and are excellent swimmers and divers. However, they have their feet placed far back on the body, making them quite ungainly on land.

- Pied-billed grebe, Podilymbus podiceps (O)

== Pigeons and doves ==
Order: Columbiformes Family: Columbidae

Pigeons and doves are stout-bodied birds with short necks and short slender bills with a fleshy cere.

- Mourning dove, Zenaida macroura (C)
- Rock pigeon, Columba livia (I) (Uc)

== Cuckoos ==
Order: Cuculiformes Family: Cuculidae

The family Cuculidae includes cuckoos, roadrunners, and anis. These birds are of variable size with slender bodies, long tails, and strong legs. The Old World cuckoos are brood parasites.

- Yellow-billed cuckoo, Coccyzus americanus (Uc)
- Black-billed cuckoo, Coccyzus erythropthalmus (Uc)

== Nightjars and allies ==
Order: Caprimulgiformes Family: Caprimulgidae

Nightjars are medium-sized nocturnal birds that usually nest on the ground. They have long wings, short legs and very short bills. Most have small feet which are of little use for walking and long, pointed wings. Their soft plumage is cryptically colored to resemble bark or leaves.

- Common nighthawk, Chordeiles minor (Uc)
- Eastern whip-poor-will, Antrostomus vociferus (Uc)

== Swifts ==
Order: Apodiformes Family: Apodidae

The swifts are small birds which spend the majority of their lives flying. These birds have very short legs and never settle voluntarily on the ground, perching instead only on vertical surfaces. Many swifts have long swept-back wings which resemble a crescent or boomerang.

- Chimney swift, Chaetura pelagica

== Hummingbirds ==
Order: Apodiformes Family: Trochilidae

Hummingbirds are small birds capable of hovering in mid-air due to the rapid flapping of their wings. They are the only birds that can fly backwards. Seven species have been recorded in Virginia.

- Ruby-throated hummingbird, Archilochus colubris

== Rails, gallinules, and coots ==
Order: Gruiformes Family: Rallidae

Rallidae is a large family of small to medium-sized birds which includes the rails, crakes, coots, and gallinules. The most typical family members occupy dense vegetation in damp environments near lakes, swamps, or rivers. In general they are shy and secretive birds, making them difficult to observe. Most species have strong legs and long toes which are well adapted to soft uneven surfaces. They tend to have short, rounded wings and to be weak fliers.

- Virginia rail, Rallus limicola (O)

== Plovers and lapwings ==
Order: Charadriiformes Family: Charadriidae

The family Charadriidae includes the plovers, dotterels, and lapwings. They are small to medium-sized birds with compact bodies, short thick necks, and long, usually pointed, wings. They are found in open country worldwide, mostly in habitats near water.

- Killdeer, Charadrius vociferus (O)

== Sandpipers and allies ==
Order: Charadriiformes Family: Scolopacidae

Scolopacidae is a large diverse family of small to medium-sized shorebirds including the sandpipers, curlews, godwits, shanks, tattlers, woodcocks, snipes, dowitchers, and phalaropes. The majority of these species eat small invertebrates picked out of the mud or soil. Different lengths of legs and bills enable multiple species to feed in the same habitat, particularly on the coast, without direct competition for food.

- Upland sandpiper, Bartramia longicauda (R)
- American woodcock, Scolopax minor (Uc)
- Wilson's snipe, Gallinago delicata (O)
- Spotted sandpiper, Actitis macularius (R)
- Solitary sandpiper, Tringa solitaria (R)

== Gulls, terns, and skimmers ==
Order: Charadriiformes Family: Laridae

Gulls are typically medium to large birds, usually gray or white, often with black markings on the head or wings. They have stout, stout, longish bills and webbed feet. The large species take up to four years to attain full adult plumage, but two years is typical for small gulls. Terns are in general medium to large birds, typically with gray or white plumage, often with black markings on the head. They have longish bills and webbed feet. They are lighter bodied and more streamlined than gulls and look elegant in flight with long tails and long narrow wings.

- Ring-billed gull, Larus delawarensis (O)
- Herring gull, Larus argentatus (O)
- Caspian tern, Hydroprogne caspia (O)

== Cormorants and shags ==
Order: Suliformes Family: Phalacrocoracidae

Cormorants are medium-to-large aquatic birds, usually with mainly dark plumage and areas of colored skin on the face. The bill is long, thin, and sharply hooked. Their feet are four-toed and webbed.

- Double-crested cormorant, Phalacrocorax auritus (O)

== Herons, egrets, and bitterns ==
Order: Pelecaniformes Family: Ardeidae

The family Ardeidae contains the herons, egrets, and bitterns. Herons and egrets are medium to large wading birds with long necks and legs. Bitterns tend to be shorter necked and more secretive. Members of Ardeidae fly with their necks retracted, unlike other long-necked birds such as storks, ibises, and spoonbills.

- American bittern, Botaurus lentiginosus (O)
- Great blue heron, Ardea herodias (O)
- Great egret, Ardea alba (O)
- Cattle egret, Bubulcus ibis (O)
- Green heron, Butorides virescens (O)
- Black-crowned night-heron, Nycticorax nycticorax (O)

== New World vultures ==
Order: Accipitriformes Family: Cathartidae

The New World vultures are not closely related to Old World vultures, but superficially resemble them because of convergent evolution. Like the Old World vultures, they are scavengers. However, unlike Old World vultures, which find carcasses by sight, New World vultures have a good sense of smell with which they locate carcasses.

- Black vulture, Coragyps atratus
- Turkey vulture, Cathartes aura

== Osprey ==
Order: Accipitriformes Family: Pandionidae

The osprey is a medium-large fish-eating bird of prey or raptor. It is widely distributed because it tolerates a wide variety of habitats, nesting in any location which is near a body of water and provides an adequate food supply. It is the only member of its family.

- Osprey, Pandion haliaetus (O)

== Hawks, eagles, and kites ==
Order: Accipitriformes Family: Accipitridae

Accipitridae is a family of birds of prey, which includes hawks, eagles, kites, harriers, and Old World vultures. These birds have very large powerful hooked beaks for tearing flesh from their prey, strong legs, powerful talons and keen eyesight.

- Golden eagle, Aquila chrysaetos (R)
- Sharp-shinned hawk, Accipiter striatus (Uc)
- Cooper's hawk, Astur cooperii (Uc)
- American goshawk, Astur atricapillus (O)
- Northern harrier, Circus husonius (O)
- Bald eagle, Haliaeetus leucocephalus (O)
- Red-shouldered hawk, Buteo lineatus (Uc)
- Broad-winged hawk, Buteo platypterus
- Red-tailed hawk, Buteo jamaicensis
- Rough-legged hawk, Buteo lagopus (O)

== Owls ==
Order: Strigiformes Family: Strigidae

Typical owls are small to large solitary nocturnal birds of prey. They have large forward-facing eyes and ears, a hawk-like beak, and a conspicuous circle of feathers around each eye called a facial disk.

- Eastern screech-owl, Megascops asio (Uc)
- Great horned owl, Bubo virginianus (Uc)
- Barred owl, Strix varia (Uc)
- Long-eared owl, Asio otus (O)
- Short-eared owl, Asio flammeus (O)
- Northern saw-whet owl, Aegolius acadicus (R)

== Kingfishers ==
Order: Coraciiformes Family: Alcedinidae

Kingfishers are medium-sized birds with large heads, long pointed bills, short legs, and stubby tails.

- Belted kingfisher, Megaceryle alcyon (O)

== Woodpeckers ==
Order: Piciformes Family: Picidae

Woodpeckers are small to medium-sized birds with chisel-like beaks, short legs, stiff tails, and long tongues used for capturing insects. Some species have feet with two toes pointing forward and two backward, while several species have only three toes. Many woodpeckers have the habit of tapping noisily on tree trunks with their beaks.

- Red-headed woodpecker, Melanerpes erythrocephalus (R)
- Red-bellied woodpecker, Melanerpes carolinus
- Yellow-bellied sapsucker, Sphyrapicus varius (Uc)
- Downy woodpecker, Dryobates pubescens
- Hairy woodpecker, Dryobates villosus (Uc)
- Northern flicker, Colaptes auratus
- Pileated woodpecker, Dryocopus pileatus (Uc)

== Falcons and caracaras ==
Order: Falconiformes Family: Falconidae

Falconidae is a family of diurnal birds of prey, notably the falcons and caracaras. They differ from hawks, eagles, and kites in that they kill with their beaks instead of their talons.

- American kestrel, Falco sparverius (O)
- Merlin, Falco columbarius (Uc)
- Peregrine falcon, Falco peregrinus

== Tyrant flycatchers ==
Order: Passeriformes Family: Tyrannidae

Tyrant flycatchers are passerine birds which occur throughout North and South America. They superficially resemble the Old World flycatchers, but are more robust and have stronger bills. They do not have the sophisticated vocal capabilities of the songbirds. Most, but not all, are rather plain. As the name implies, most are insectivorous.

- Great crested flycatcher, Myiarchus crinitus
- Eastern kingbird, Tyrannus tyrannus (O)
- Olive-sided flycatcher, Contopus cooperi (O)
- Eastern wood-pewee, Contopus virens
- Yellow-bellied flycatcher, Empidonax flaviventris (Uc)
- Acadian flycatcher, Empidonax virescens
- Alder flycatcher, Empidonax alnorum (O)
- Willow flycatcher, Empidonax traillii (O)
- Least flycatcher, Empidonax minimus (O)
- Eastern phoebe, Sayornis phoebe

== Vireos, shrike-babblers, and erpornis ==
Order: Passeriformes Family: Vireonidae

The vireos are a group of small to medium-sized passerine birds restricted to the New World. They are typically greenish in color and resemble the wood-warblers except for their heavier bills.

- White-eyed vireo, Vireo griseus (Uc)
- Yellow-throated vireo, Vireo flavifrons (Uc)
- Blue-headed vireo, Vireo solitarius
- Philadelphia vireo, Vireo philadelphicus
- Warbling vireo, Vireo gilvus (R)
- Red-eyed vireo, Vireo olivaceus

== Shrikes ==
Order: Passeriformes Family: Laniidae

Shrikes are passerine birds known for their habit of catching other birds and small animals and impaling the uneaten portions of their bodies on thorns. A shrike's beak is hooked, like that of a typical bird of prey.

- Northern shrike, Lanius borealis (O)

== Crows, jays, and magpies ==
Order: Passeriformes Family: Corvidae

The family Corvidae includes crows, ravens, jays, choughs, magpies, treepies, nutcrackers, and ground jays. Corvids are above average in size among the Passeriformes, and some of the larger species show high levels of intelligence.

- Blue jay, Cyanocitta cristata
- American crow, Corvus brachyrhynchos
- Fish crow, Corvus ossifragus (O)
- Common raven, Corvus corax

== Tits, chickadees, and titmice ==
Order: Passeriformes Family: Paridae

The Paridae are mainly small stocky woodland species with short stout bills. Some have crests. They are adaptable birds, with a mixed diet including seeds and insects.

- Carolina chickadee, Poecile carolinensis
- Black-capped chickadee, Poecile atricapilla (Uc)
- Tufted titmouse, Baeolophus bicolor

== Larks ==
Order: Passeriformes Family: Alaudidae

Larks are small terrestrial birds with often extravagant songs and display flights. Most larks are fairly dull in appearance. Their food is insects and seeds.

- Horned lark, Eremophila alpestris (R)

== Swallows ==
Order: Passeriformes Family: Hirundinidae

The family Hirundinidae is adapted to aerial feeding. They have a slender streamlined body, long pointed wings, and a short bill with a wide gape. The feet are adapted to perching rather than walking and the front toes are partially joined at the base.

- Bank swallow, Riparia riparia (R)
- Tree swallow, Tachycineta bicolor (O)
- Northern rough-winged swallow, Stelgidopteryx serripennis (Uc)
- Purple martin, Progne subis (R)
- Barn swallow, Hirundo rustica (Uc)
- Cliff swallow, Petrochelidon pyrrhonota (O)

== Kinglets ==
Order: Passeriformes Family: Regulidae

The kinglets are a family of very small insectivorous birds, mostly in the genus Regulus. The adults have colored crowns, giving rise to their name.

- Ruby-crowned kinglet, Corthylio calendula
- Golden-crowned kinglet, Regulus satrapa

== Waxwings ==
Order: Passeriformes Family: Bombycillidae

The waxwings are a group of birds with soft silky plumage and unique red tips to some of the wing feathers. In the Bohemian and cedar waxwings, these tips look like sealing wax and give the group its name. These are arboreal birds of northern forests. They live on insects in summer and berries in winter.

- Cedar waxwing, Bombycilla cedrorum (Uc)

== Nuthatches ==
Order: Passeriformes Family: Sittidae

Nuthatches are small woodland birds. They have the unusual ability to climb down trees head first, unlike other birds which can only go upwards. Nuthatches have big heads, short tails, and powerful bills and feet.

- Red-breasted nuthatch, Sitta canadensis (O)
- White-breasted nuthatch, Sitta carolinensis

== Treecreepers ==
Order: Passeriformes Family: Certhiidae

Treecreepers are small woodland birds, brown above and white below. They have thin pointed down-curved bills, which they use to extricate insects from bark. They have stiff tail feathers, like woodpeckers, which they use to support themselves on vertical trees.

- Brown creeper, Certhia americana (Uc)

== Gnatcatchers ==
Order: Passeriformes Family: Polioptilidae

These dainty birds resemble Old World warblers in their structure and habits, moving restlessly through foliage while seeking insects. The gnatcatchers are mainly a soft bluish gray in color and have the long sharp bill typical of an insectivore. Many species have distinctive black head patterns (especially males) and long, regularly cocked black-and-white tails.

- Blue-gray gnatcatcher, Polioptila caerulea (c)

== Wrens ==
Order: Passeriformes Family: Troglodytidae

Wrens are small and inconspicuous birds, except for their loud songs. They have short wings and thin down-turned bills. Several species often hold their tails upright. All are insectivorous.

- Carolina wren, Thryothorus ludovicianus
- Northern house wren, Troglodytes aedon (Uc)
- Winter wren, Troglodytes hiemalis (R)

== Mockingbirds and thrashers ==
Order: Passeriformes Family: Mimidae

The mimids are a family of passerine birds which includes thrashers, mockingbirds, tremblers, and the New World catbirds. These birds are notable for their vocalization, especially their remarkable ability to mimic a wide variety of birds and other sounds heard outdoors. The species tend towards dull grays and browns in their appearance.

- Gray catbird, Dumetella carolinensis
- Brown thrasher, Toxostoma rufum (Uc)
- Northern mockingbird, Mimus polyglottos (O)

== Starlings ==
Order: Passeriformes Family: Sturnidae

Starlings are small to medium-sized Old World passerine birds with strong feet. Their flight is strong and direct and most are very gregarious. Their preferred habitat is fairly open country, and they eat insects and fruit. The plumage of several species is dark with a metallic sheen.

- European starling, Sturnus vulgaris (I) (Uc)

== Thrushes and allies ==
Order: Passeriformes Family: Turdidae

The thrushes are a group of passerine birds that occur mainly but not exclusively in the Old World. They are plump, soft plumaged, small to medium-sized insectivores or sometimes omnivores, often feeding on the ground. Many have attractive songs.

- Eastern bluebird, Sialia sialis
- Veery, Catharus fuscescens
- Gray-cheeked thrush, Catharus minimus (R)
- Swainson's thrush, Catharus ustulatus (Uc)
- Hermit thrush, Catharus guttatus (Uc)
- Wood thrush, Hylocichla mustelina
- American robin, Turdus migratorius

== Old World sparrows ==
Order: Passeriformes Family: Passeridae

Old World sparrows are small passerine birds. In general, sparrows tend to be small plump brownish or grayish birds with short tails and short powerful beaks. Sparrows are seed eaters, but they also consume small insects.

- House sparrow, Passer domesticus (I) (Uc)

== Wagtails and pipits ==
Order: Passeriformes Family: Motacillidae

Motacillidae is a family of small passerine birds with medium to long tails. They include the wagtails, longclaws, and pipits. They are slender ground-feeding insectivores of open country.

- American pipit, Anthus rubescens (R)

== Finches, euphonias, and allies ==
Order: Passeriformes Family: Fringillidae

Finches are seed-eating passerine birds that are small to moderately large and have a strong beak, usually conical and in some species very large. All have twelve tail feathers and nine primaries. These birds have a bouncing flight with alternating bouts of flapping and gliding on closed wings, and most sing well.

- Evening grosbeak, Coccothraustes vespertinus (O)
- Pine grosbeak, Pinicola enucleator (O)
- House finch, Haemorhous mexicanus (Native to the southwestern U.S.; introduced in the east) (Uc)
- Purple finch, Haemorhous purpureus (O)
- Redpoll, Acanthis flammea (R)
- Red crossbill, Loxia curvirostra (R)
- White-winged crossbill, Loxia leucoptera (O)
- Pine siskin, Spinus pinus (Uc)
- American goldfinch, Spinus tristis

== Longspurs and snow buntings ==
Order: Passeriformes Family: Calcariidae

The Calcariidae are a group of passerine birds that were traditionally grouped with the New World sparrows, but differ in a number of respects and are usually found in open grassy areas.

- Lapland longspur, Calcarius lapponicus (R)
- Snow bunting, Plectrophenax nivalis (R)

== New world sparrows ==
Order: Passeriformes Family: Passerellidae

Until 2017, these species were considered part of the family Emberizidae. Most of the species are known as sparrows, but these birds are not closely related to the Old World sparrows which are in the family Passeridae. Many of these have distinctive head patterns.

- Grasshopper sparrow, Ammodramus savannarum (R)
- Chipping sparrow, Spizella passerina
- Field sparrow, Spizella pusilla
- Fox sparrow, Passerella iliaca (Uc)
- American tree sparrow, Spizelloides arborea (R)
- Dark-eyed junco, Junco hyemalis
- White-crowned sparrow, Zonotrichia leucophrys
- White-throated sparrow, Zonotrichia albicollis (O)
- Vesper sparrow, Pooecetes gramineus (R)
- Henslow's sparrow, Centronyx henslowii (O)
- Savannah sparrow, Passerculus sandwichensis (O)
- Song sparrow, Melospiza melodia
- Lincoln's sparrow, Melospiza lincolnii (R)
- Swamp sparrow, Melospiza georgiana (Uc)
- Eastern towhee, Pipilo erythrophthalmus

== Yellow-breasted chat ==
Order: Passeriformes Family: Icteriidae

This species was historically placed in the wood-warblers (Parulidae) but nonetheless most authorities were unsure if it belonged there. It was placed in its own family in 2017.

- Yellow-breasted chat, Icteria virens (O)

== Troupials and allies ==
Order: Passeriformes Family: Icteridae

The icterids are a group of small to medium-sized, often colorful passerine birds restricted to the New World and include the grackles, New World blackbirds, and New World orioles. Most species have black as a predominant plumage color, often enlivened by yellow, orange, or red.

- Bobolink, Dolichonyx oryzivorus (R)
- Eastern meadowlark, Sturnella magna (R)
- Orchard oriole, Icterus spurius (R)
- Baltimore oriole, Icterus galbula (R)
- Red-winged blackbird, Agelaius phoeniceus (Uc)
- Brown-headed cowbird, Molothrus ater
- Rusty blackbird, Euphagus carolinus (R)
- Common grackle, Quiscalus quiscula

== New World warblers ==
Order: Passeriformes Family: Parulidae

The wood-warblers are a group of small, often colorful passerine birds restricted to the New World. Most are arboreal, but some are more terrestrial, such as the Ovenbird. Most members of this family are insectivores.

- Ovenbird, Seiurus aurocapilla
- Worm-eating warbler, Helmitheros vermivorum (Uc)
- Louisiana waterthrush, Parkesia motacilla (Uc)
- Northern waterthrush, Parkesia noveboracensis (O)
- Golden-winged warbler, Vermivora chrysoptera (Uc)
- Blue-winged warbler, Vermivora cyanoptera (Uc)
- Black-and-white warbler, Mniotilta varia (Uc)
- Tennessee warbler, Leiothlypis peregrina (Uc)
- Orange-crowned warbler, Leiothlypis celata (R)
- Nashville warbler, Leiothlypis ruficapilla (R)
- Connecticut warbler, Oporornis agilis (O)
- Mourning warbler, Geothlypis philadelphia (O)
- Kentucky warbler, Geothlypis formosa (Uc)
- Common yellowthroat, Geothlypis trichas (O)
- Hooded warbler, Setophaga citrina
- American redstart, Setophaga ruticilla
- Cape May warbler, Setophaga tigrina (Uc)
- Cerulean warbler, Setophaga cerulea (Uc)
- Northern parula, Setophaga americana
- Magnolia warbler, Setophaga magnolia (Uc)
- Bay-breasted warbler, Setophaga castanea (O)
- Blackburnian warbler, Setophaga fusca (Uc)
- Yellow warbler, Setophaga petechia (O)
- Chestnut-sided warbler, Setophaga pensylvanica
- Blackpoll warbler, Setophaga striata (O)
- Black-throated blue warbler, Setophaga caerulescens (Uc)
- Palm warbler, Setophaga palmarum (O)
- Pine warbler, Setophaga pinus (Uc)
- Yellow-rumped warbler, Setophaga coronata (Uc)
- Yellow-throated warbler, Setophaga dominica (O)
- Prairie warbler, Setophaga discolor (Uc)
- Black-throated green warbler, Setophaga virens (Uc)
- Canada warbler, Cardellina canadensis (O)
- Wilson's warbler, Cardellina pusilla (O)

== Cardinals and allies ==
Order: Passeriformes Family: Cardinalidae

The cardinals are a family of robust, seed-eating birds with strong bills. They are typically associated with open woodland. The sexes usually have distinct plumages.

- Summer tanager, Piranga rubra (R)
- Scarlet tanager, Piranga olivacea
- Northern cardinal, Cardinalis cardinalis
- Rose-breasted grosbeak, Pheucticus ludovicianus
- Blue grosbeak, Passerina caerulea (O)
- Indigo bunting, Passerina cyanea

== See also ==
- List of birds of Virginia
- List of birds
- Lists of birds by region
- List of North American birds
