= Petersburg Mountain =

Mountain in New York, United States

- Location within New York Location within the United States

Highest point
- Elevation: 2,323 feet (708 m)
- Coordinates: 42°37′59″N 74°26′57″W

Geography
- Location: Cobleskill, New York, U.S.
- Topo map: USGS Cobleskill

Petersburg Mountain is a mountain located in the Catskill Mountains of New York southeast of Cobleskill. Warnerville Hill is located northwest, and Donats Mountain is located northwest of Petersburg Mountain. In 1940, a 67-foot-6-inch-tall (20.57 m) steel fire lookout tower was built on the mountain. The tower was closed at the end of the 1971 season, and later transferred to Schoharie County for use as a radio tower. The tower site is closed to the public.

== History ==
In 1940, the Civilian Conservation Corps built a 67-foot-6-inch-tall (20.57 m) International Derrick tower on the mountain. The tower was first staffed in 1941, reporting 7 fire and 223 visitors. Due to increased use of aerial detection for fire watching, the tower was closed at the end of the 1971 season. The tower was later transferred to Schoharie County for use as a radio tower. The county removed the cab and added 30 feet (9.1 m) to the tower to make room for more antennas. The tower was later removed and replaced with an antenna support structure. The fire lookout tower was sold to Barry Knight, who relocated it to his property in West Hurley.
