= Donats Mountain =

Mountain in New York, United States

- Location within New York Location within the United States

Highest point
- Elevation: 1,430 feet (440 m)
- Coordinates: 42°39′41″N 74°29′02″W

Geography
- Location: Cobleskill, New York, U.S.
- Topo map: USGS Cobleskill

Donats Mountain is a mountain located in the Catskill Mountains of New York south of Cobleskill. Mount Shank is located northwest, Warnerville Hill is located south-southeast, and Petersburg Mountain is located southeast of Donats Mountain.
