= Hogback Mountain (Shenandoah National Park, Virginia) =

Mountain in Virginia, US

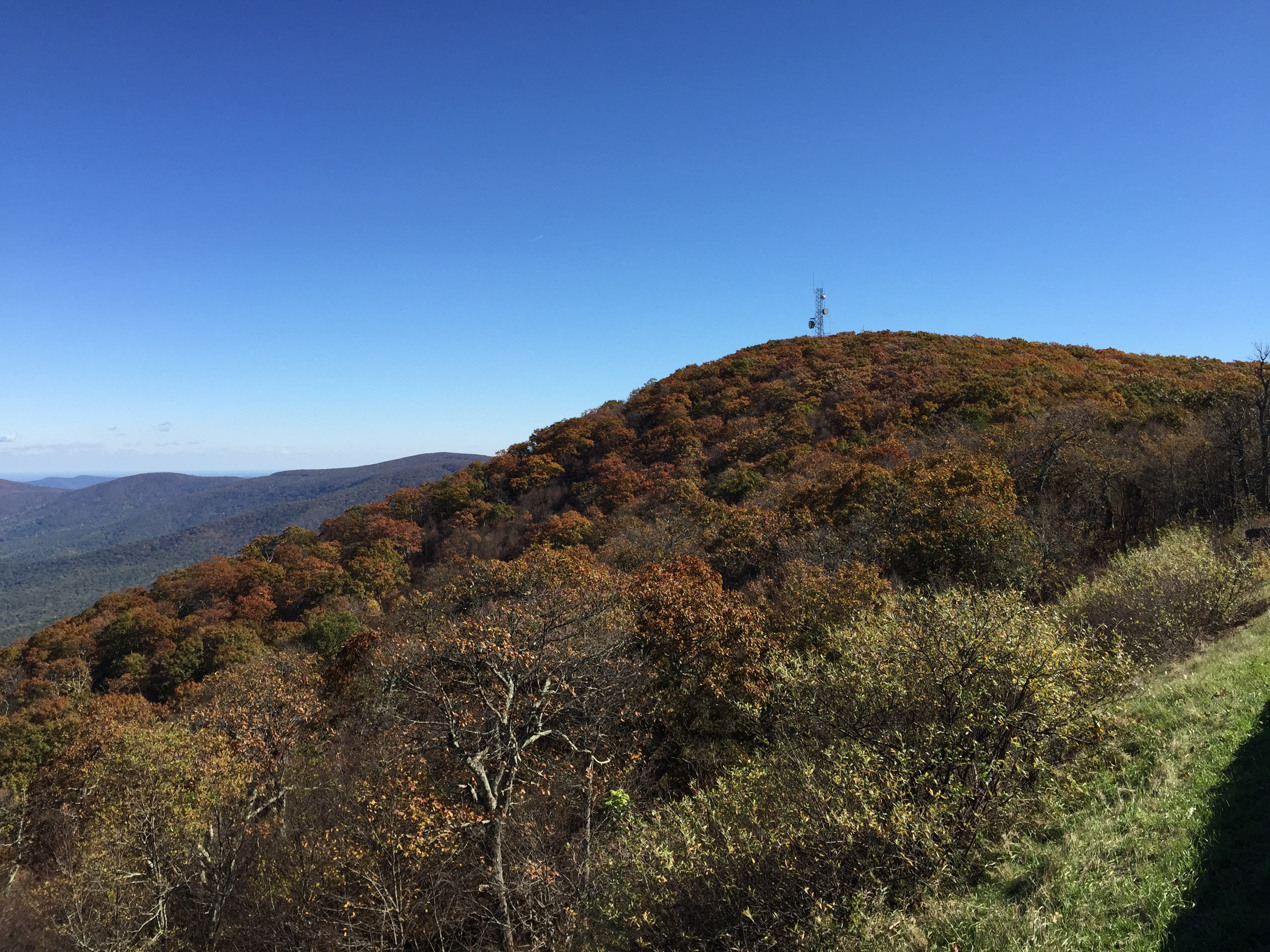
- View of the summit from the Hogback Overlook on Skyline Drive

Highest point
- Elevation: 3,474 ft (1,059 m)
- Prominence: 1,154 ft (352 m)
- Parent peak: The Pinnacle
- Coordinates: 38°45′43″N 78°16′27″W

Geography
- Location within Virginia
- Location: Shenandoah National Park, Warren and Rappahannock counties, Virginia, U.S.
- Parent range: Blue Ridge Mountains; Appalachian Mountains

Hogback Mountain is the highest peak in the northern portion of Shenandoah National Park as well as the highest point in Warren County in northern Virginia, United States. A part of the Blue Ridge Mountains, it is located along the border of Warren and Rappahannock counties. It is easily accessible via Skyline Drive and the Appalachian Trail.
