= Mount Shank =

Mountain in New York, United States

- Location within New York Location within the United States

Highest point
- Elevation: 1,450 feet (440 m)
- Coordinates: 42°40′59″N 74°29′56″W, 42°40′59″N 74°30′00″W

Geography
- Location: Cobleskill, New York, U.S.
- Topo map(s): USGS Cobleskill, Richmondville

Mount Shank is a mountain located in the Catskill Mountains of New York northwest of Cobleskill. Hogback is located northeast, and Donats Mountain is located southeast of Mount Shank.
