= Hogback Mountain (Loudoun County, Virginia) =

Mountain in Virginia, United States

- Location within Virginia

Highest point
- Elevation: 670 ft (200 m)
- Prominence: 130 ft (40 m)
- Parent peak: Catoctin Mountain
- Coordinates: 39°06′N 77°36′W

Geography
- Location: Loudoun County, Virginia, U.S.
- Parent range: Blue Ridge Mountains; Appalachian Mountains

Hogback Mountain is part of Catoctin Mountain, located southwest of Leesburg in Loudoun County, Virginia. The mountain ridge rises immediately to the west of U.S. Route 15, just south of Sycolin Creek and extends 2.5 miles (4.0 km) south to the banks of Goose Creek. It is so named for its appearance when approaching it from the north of resembling a pig on its back. The ridge is mislabeled on older USGS topographic maps as being located to the north, between Sycolin Creek and Leesburg.
