= Hogback Mountain (Klamath County, Oregon) =

Hill in Oregon, United States

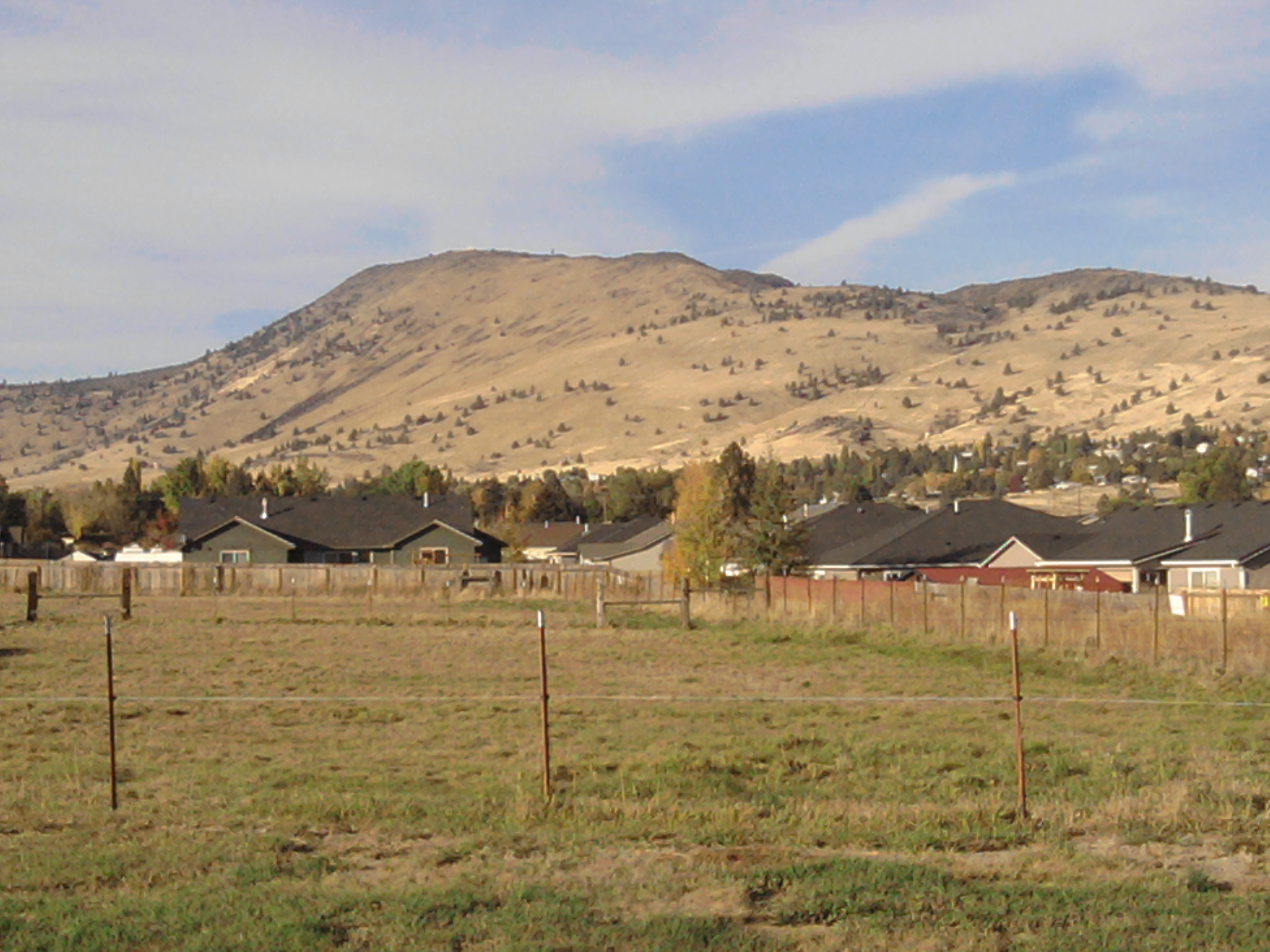
- Hogback Mountain viewed from Klamath Falls, OR

Highest point
- Elevation: 6,205 ft (1,891 m) NAVD 88
- Prominence: 1,280 ft (390 m)
- Coordinates: 42°14′35″N 121°42′21″W

Geography
- Location within Oregon
- Location: Klamath County, Oregon, U.S.
- Parent range: Cascades
- Topo map: USGS Altamont

Climbing
- Easiest route: Hike, mountain bike

Hogback Mountain or Hogsback Mountain is a large hill northeast of Klamath Falls, Oregon, United States. Hogback was named because from Klamath Falls, the hill looks similar to the shoulders of a pig.

The majority of Hogback is privately owned, but open to hikers. Fence tampering and all-terrain vehicle (ATV) use is strictly prohibited due to livestock activities on the mountain and surrounding areas. No hunting or firearms are allowed on the mountain without written permission.

For hiker safety, there is no public access to the mountain during open deer rifle season which ran October 2–13, 2010 and October 23–31, 2010. This is due to landowners and their guests' hunting activities on this mountain.
