= National Register of Historic Places listings in Fairfax, Virginia =

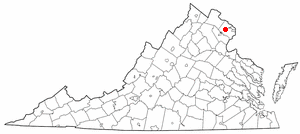
Location of Fairfax in Virginia

This is a list of the National Register of Historic Places listings in Fairfax, Virginia.

This is intended to be a complete list of the properties and districts on the National Register of Historic Places in the independent city of Fairfax, Virginia, United States. The locations of National Register properties and districts for which the latitude and longitude coordinates are included below, may be seen in a Google map.

There are 6 properties and districts listed on the National Register in the city.

This National Park Service list is complete through NPS recent listings posted February 6, 2026.

== Current listings ==
| | Name on the Register | Image | Date listed | Location | Description |
|---|---|---|---|---|---|
| 1 | 29 Diner | 29 Diner | October 29, 1992 (#92001370) | 10536 Lee Highway; 38°51′29″N 77°18′32″W | |
| 2 | Blenheim | Blenheim | February 23, 2001 (#01000152) | 3610 Old Lee Highway; 38°51′19″N 77°17′34″W | |
| 3 | City of Fairfax Historic District | City of Fairfax Historic District | August 27, 1987 (#87001432) | Junction of State Routes 123 and 236; 38°50′46″N 77°18′24″W | |
| 4 | Fairfax County Courthouse | Fairfax County Courthouse | May 3, 1974 (#74002235) | 4000 Chain Bridge Rd. 38°50′44″N 77°18′26″W | Boundary Increase in 1981 to include the Old Fairfax County Jail |
| 5 | Fairfax Public School | Fairfax Public School | October 21, 1992 (#92001367) | 10209 Main St. 38°50′40″N 77°18′02″W | |
| 6 | Ratcliffe-Logan-Allison House | Ratcliffe-Logan-Allison House | February 16, 1973 (#73002209) | 200 E. Main St. 38°50′45″N 77°18′17″W | |

== See also ==
- List of National Historic Landmarks in Virginia
- National Register of Historic Places listings in Virginia
