= Marshall Hall =

Marshall Hall may refer to:

== People ==
- Marshall Hall (economist) (1934–2022), Jamaican economist
- Marshall Hall (physiologist) (1790–1857), English physiologist
  - George Marshall-Hall (1862–1915), Australian musician and educator, his grandson
- Marshall Hall (mathematician) (1910–1990), American mathematician
- Edward Marshall Hall (1858–1927), English barrister and MP
- Marshall Hall (singer) (born 1970), former member of the Gaither Vocal Band

== Places ==
- Marshall Hall, Maryland, listed on the NRHP in Maryland
- Marshall Hall (Amherst, Massachusetts), a former microbiology laboratory at the University of Massachusetts
- Marshall Hall (amusement park), an amusement park at Marshall Hall, Maryland

== See also ==
- Marsh Hall (disambiguation)
