= Trinity Christian School (Fairfax, Virginia) =

Coordinates: 38.8337°N 77.3325°W

- Fairfax, Virginia; USA

Information
- Type: Private
- Motto: "Pursuing Excellence for the Mind & Heart"
- Established: 1987
- Headmaster: Dr. Matthew Thomas
- Faculty: 97 faculty
- Enrollment: 690 - 750 students (K through 12th)
- Colors: Blue & White
- Mascot: Gryphon [a lion with the head and wings of an eagle]
- Website: www.tcsfairfax.org

Trinity Christian School is a private, K-12, non-denominational Christian school centrally located in Fairfax County, Virginia, serving the Northern Virginia area of metropolitan Washington, DC.

In recent years, Trinity Christian School has consistently held enrollment at 690 - 750 students in grades K through twelve. Of its roughly 97 faculty members, over 60% hold advanced degrees. The campus contains 92,000 sq/ft of buildings (totaling $30 million) on a 25-acre campus. Enrollment at the school is capped at 750 students due to county restrictions and regulations for the campus site. Ongoing demand has led to multi-year waitlists in many of the grades.

Unique to the upper school is a house system, which was established in 2022. Made up of four houses, the house system includes a head male and a head female student.

== History ==
In 1987 the vestry of Truro Anglican Church voted unanimously to found Trinity Christian School, with Dr. J.C. Lasmanis named as its first headmaster. Trinity opened its doors to a total of forty-one students from first through third grade, each taught by three faculty members in classrooms provided by Truro.

In 1990 Dr. Jim Beavers took over the reins as headmaster. During Mr. Beavers' time in office: a 4th and 5th grade was added, a middle and upper school was established, enrollment greatly increased, and the faculty grew. Eventually the school spread to encompass four different campuses in and throughout Fairfax county.

In 2001 Trinity named a new head of school, Dr. Todd Williams, and graduated its first senior class, which consisted of three students. By this time fifty faculty members served over four hundred students on Trinity's four campuses. Although there had been many advantages for the school due to its rapid growth, unity between the different campuses was becoming a problem. Shortly after taking office, Dr. Williams made it a top priority to unite all the students onto one main campus. After two years of hard fundraising Trinity proudly opened the doors to its new 25-acre campus facility, located in Fairfax off of Braddock Road next to George Mason University. The new building included a state-of-the-art computer lab, two custom-made art rooms, a practice gymnasium, and a science lab. All classes were moved to the new campus.

In 2005 Dr. Williams resigned as Trinity's headmaster to accept the vice presidency of Cairn University (then Philadelphia Biblical University). After much deliberation, the Trinity Christian board of trustees appointed then-teacher Dr. David Vanderpoel as the school's fourth headmaster. Under his leadership, Dr. Vanderpoel oversaw the addition of a second building to the campus to serve the upper school. Complete with a gymnasium with bleacher seating for 900, a performing arts stage and adjoining wing, a weight room, and additional science labs made up the building. During his tenure, the athletic fields were also converted to turf fields.

In 2012, Trinity Christian School was awarded accreditation by the Southern Association of Colleges and Schools Council on Accreditation and School Improvement (SACS-CASI), the accreditation division of AdvancED. Expansion of the student body continued and in 2019 the school purchased a 29-acre piece of land a mile away on Shirley Gate Road.

In 2022, Dr. David Vanderpoel announced his intention to retire at the end of the academic year. In 2023, after a national search, Trinity Christian School's Board of Trustees appointed Dr. Matt Thomas, then the executive director of the Center for School Leadership at Baylor University, as Trinity's next Head of School.

== Accolades and student achievement ==
In 2019, Trinity Christian School was designated a National Blue Ribbon School by the National Blue Ribbon Schools Program, 1 of only 362 schools to receive this throughout the nation. In 2025, the school was again selected as a National Blue Ribbon School, one of only 50 private schools nationwide to earn this recognition, shortly before the U.S. Department of Education announced the discontinuation of the National Blue Ribbon program.

The school reports that since its first graduation class in 2001, the school has produced 22 National Merit Finalists and 98 National Merit Commended Scholars, and that the mean ACT score for the classes of 2017 - 2022 was 28, while the mean SAT score for the same was 660 (Evidence-Based Reading and Writing) and 641 (Math). U.S. News & World Report similarly lists the school's average ACT score as 28 and its average SAT score as 1200.

Trinity Christian School has the distinction of having a graduate accepted into four of the five U.S. service academies. Graduates have also gone on to Ivy League schools such as Columbia University. The school won the 2025 National History Bowl in the Junior Varsity Open Small School category. Notable alumni include DonorSee founder Gret Glyer and Fulbright scholar Sam Powers among others.

The school ranked 15th on The Roanoke Times 2023 list of the best private high schools in Virginia. In 2024, a student at the school was named a semifinalist in the National Merit Scholarship Program, whose winners represent less than 1 percent of the country's most academically successful high school seniors.

== Extracurricular activities ==
The schools offers 36 sports teams, choral music, instrumental music, theater arts, visual arts, clubs, student government, and honor societies. The school's Honors Choral Ensemble has performed at the White House.

=== Athletic teams ===
School teams
Girls	Boys
Cross Country	Cross Country
Swim and Dive	Swim and Dive
Basketball	Basketball
	Baseball
Lacrosse	Lacrosse
Soccer	Soccer
Tennis	Tennis
Track and Field	Track and Field
Volleyball	
Golf	Golf
Field Hockey	
Softball
Cheer

=== Associations ===
- AdvancED - TCS is accredited by the Southern Association of Colleges and Schools Council on Accreditation and School Improvement (SACS-CASI), an accreditation division of AdvancED.
- MSA-CESS - Middle States Association Commissions on Elementary and Secondary Schools
- ECFA - Evangelical Council for Financial Accountability
- VCAC - Virginia Christian Athletic Conference
- VISSA - Virginia Independent Schools Athletic Association
- VCPE - Virginia Council for Private Education
- CFCC - Central Fairfax Chamber of Commerce
