= Ford Building (Fairfax, Virginia) =

Historic house in Virginia, United States

- U.S. National Register of Historic Places
- U.S. Historic district – Contributing property
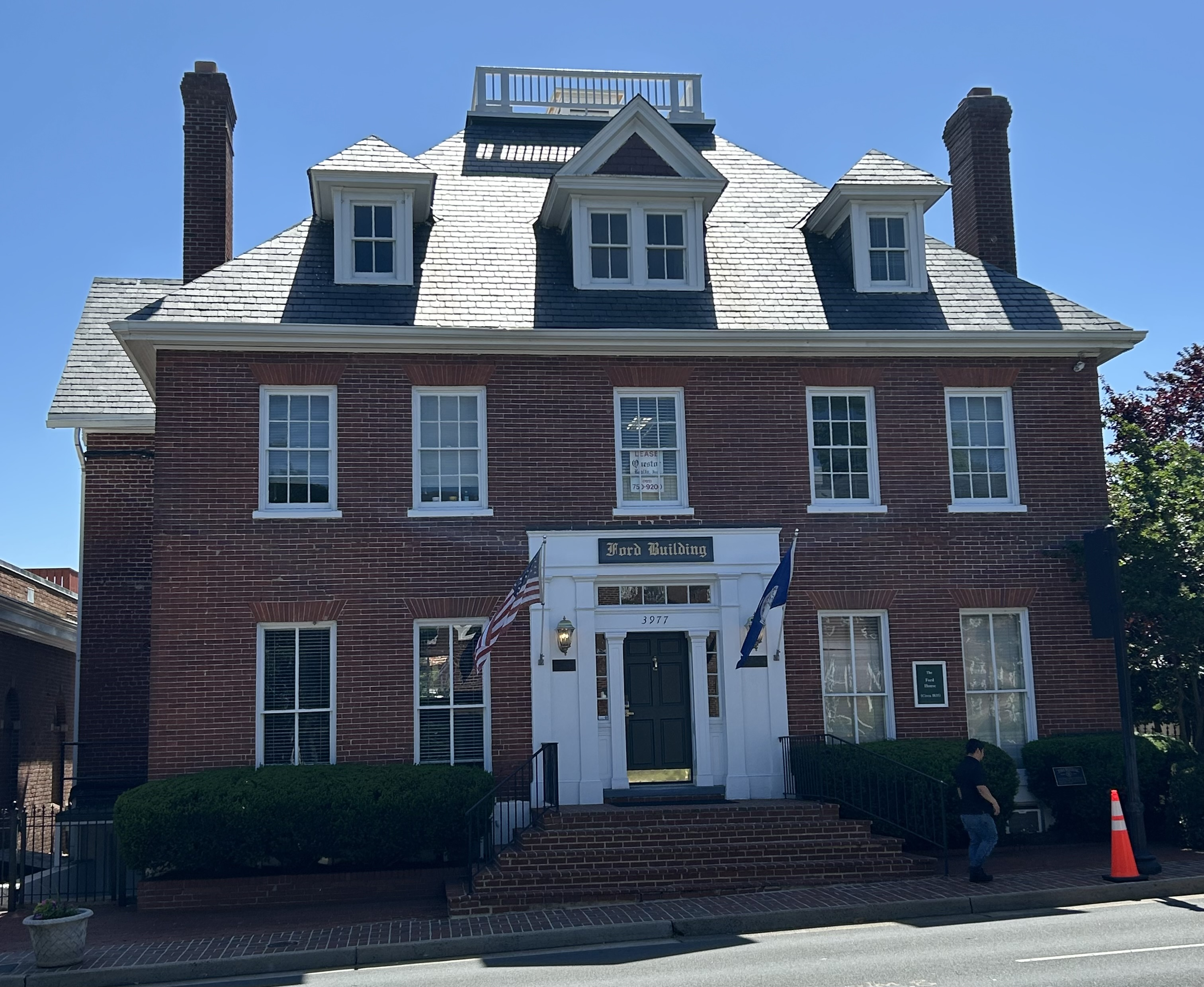
- Ford Building in 2025

- Location within Fairfax Location within Northern Virginia Location within Virginia Location within the United States
- Location: 3977 Chain Bridge Road; Fairfax, Virginia
- Coordinates: 38.84666°N 77.3063575°W
- Built: 1835
- Architectural style: Georgian Revival
- Part of: City of Fairfax Historic District
- NRHP reference No.: 87001432

The Ford House is a Georgian Revival former home (now a commercial building) built c. 1835. The most famous resident, Antonia Ford, was a spy for the Confederate States Army during the American Civil War. It was placed on the National Register of Historic Places in 1987 as part of the City of Fairfax Historic District.

== Antonia Ford ==
Born and raised in Fairfax, Virginia, Antonia Ford was able to remain in the town once occupied by Union forces in mid-1861. Ford was able to gain intelligence from Union troops, which she passed on to Confederate leaders. She was eventually discovered and arrested on March 13, and incarcerated in Washington, D.C. at the Old Capitol Prison.
