= Ford Building =

Ford Building may refer to:

- Ford Building (San Diego), part of the California Pacific International Exposition that now houses the San Diego Air & Space Museum
- Ford House Office Building, Washington, DC building used by the U.S. House of Representatives
- Ford Building (Detroit), downtown office building; tallest in Michigan (1909-1913)
- Ford Foundation Building, New York City structure by architect Kevin Roche
- Ford Building (Fairfax, Virginia), home to Antonia Ford, a confederate spy in the Civil War
