= Old Fairfax County Jail =

- Fairfax County Courthouse and Jail (Boundary Increase)
- U.S. National Register of Historic Places
- U.S. Historic district – Contributing property
- Virginia Landmarks Register
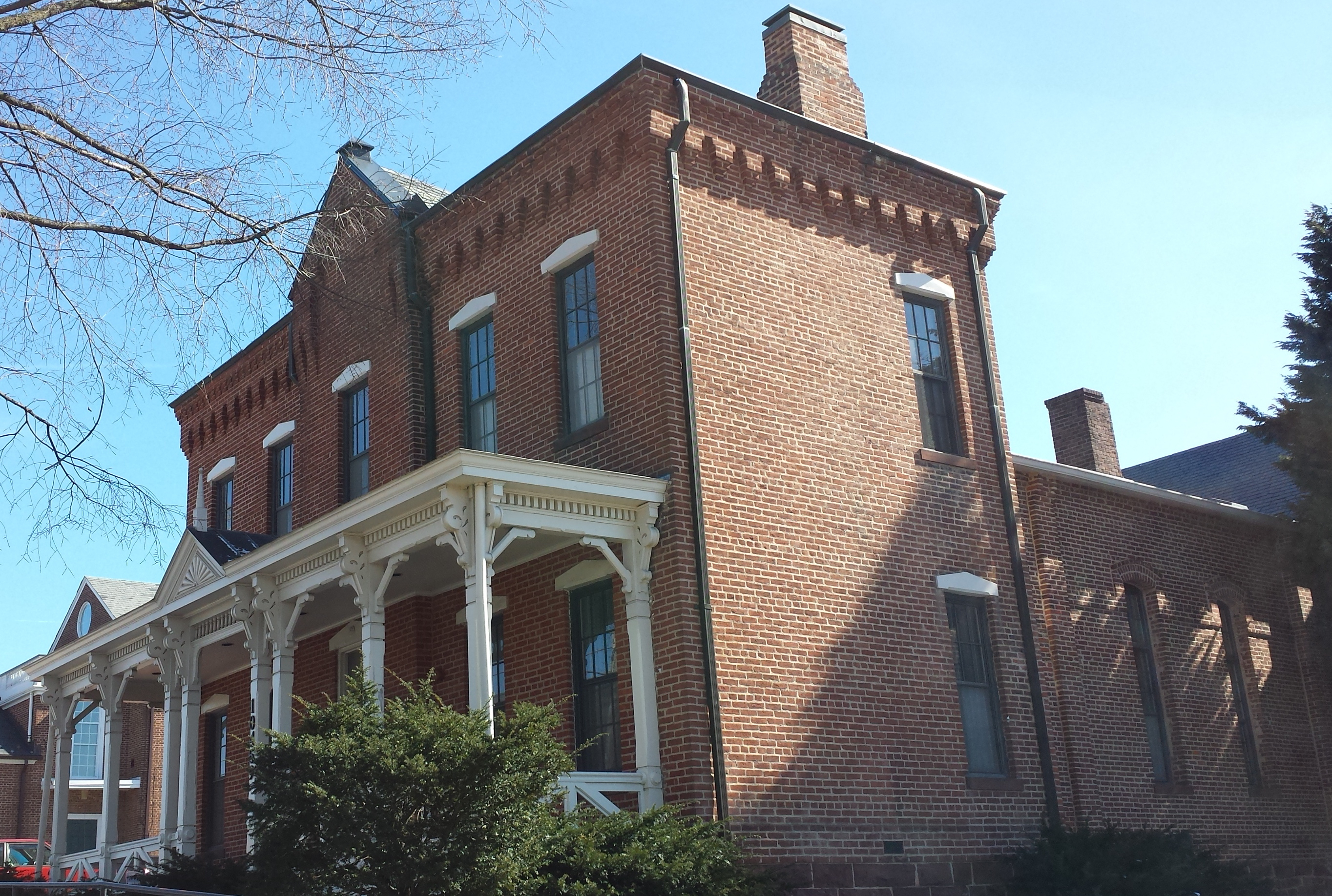

- Location within Fairfax Location within Northern Virginia Location within Virginia Location within the United States
- Location: 4000 Chain Bridge Rd., Fairfax, Virginia
- Coordinates: 38°50′45″N 77°18′27″W
- Area: 1 acre (0.40 ha)
- Built: 1885
- Architectural style: Late Victorian
- Part of: Moorefield Historic District (ID86000774); City of Fairfax Historic District (ID8700143)
- NRHP reference No.: 81000673
- VLR No.: 151-0003-0001

Significant dates
- Added to NRHP: October 1, 1981
- Designated NRHP: January 15, 1986
- Designated CP: August 27, 1987
- Designated VLR: November 18, 1980

The Old Fairfax County Jail was built in 1885, behind the Fairfax County Court House. It was added to the National Register of Historic Places in 1981, expanding the previously listed Fairfax County Court House. It is located in the City of Fairfax Historic District.

== Uses ==
The building operated as a jail for 68 years, until 1953 when jail facilities were added to the courthouse. Since 1956 it has been used for various county offices such as juvenile court, fine board, police dispatch, and recreation.

== Historic documents ==
The former jail was used for the County Clerk's Office c. 1974, during which time historically important documents were found in the building such as two volumes of early 19th-century registrations of free blacks, as well as the wills of George and Martha Washington.

While George Washington's will remained in the adjacent Fairfax Court House during the Civil War, Martha's did not. When Union troops from the Ohio Volunteer Infantry occupied the original building in 1862, Lt Col David Thompson picked up some papers in the building, and recognizing Martha Washington's will, kept it. His daughter sold the will after his death to J. P. Morgan. Between 1908 and 1913, the Fairfax County Court Clerk and the Commonwealth's Attorney attempted to have the will returned, but were unsuccessful. After Morgan's death, the Falls Church chapter of the Daughters of the American Revolution took up the effort with a letter to Morgan's son, requesting the will. The issue finally rose to the level of the Virginia General Assembly, Governor, Attorney General, Supreme Court, and the U.S Supreme Court. It was returned to Fairfax in 1915, when J. P. Morgan, Jr. decided not to fight the Supreme Court case that had been brought by Virginia.
