= Marsh House =

Marsh House may refer to:

== United Kingdom ==
- Marsh House, Darwen, Lancashire, England
- Marsh Farmhouse, an historic building in Thornton-Cleveleys, Lancashire, England

== United States ==
- Martin Luther Marsh House, Nevada City, California
- Marsh Hall or the Othniel C. Marsh House, New Haven, Connecticut, designated a U.S. National Historic Landmark
- Marsh-Warthen House, a museum in Lafayette, Georgia
- William W. Marsh House, Sycamore, Illinois
- Palmer-Marsh House, Bath, North Carolina
- Marsh House (Fairfax, Virginia), a house in the City of Fairfax Historic District

== See also ==
- Marsh Hall (disambiguation)
