= Marsh Hall (disambiguation) =

Marsh Hall is a building and U.S. National Historic Landmark at Yale University in New Haven, Connecticut, also known as the Othniel C. Marsh House.

Marsh Hall may also refer to:

- Marsh Hall (Pacific University), in Forest Grove, Oregon, a Pacific University building built in 1895
- Marsh Hall (Salem State University), a residence hall in Massachusetts
- Marsh Hall (Concord University), built in 1912, originally called "Old Main"
- Marsh Hall (Combs, Derbyshire), a Grade II listed building from the 17th century
- Marsh Hall (Northowram), a Grade II listed building from the 17th century
- Marsh Hall (Kirkburton) a Grade II listed building from 1596

== See also ==
- Marshall Hall (disambiguation)
- Marsh House (disambiguation)
