= Walter Tansill Oliver =

American politician and lawyer (1873–1932)

Member of the Virginia Senate from the Fairfax district
- In office March 1, 1920 – February 29, 1924
- Preceded by: Edgar Lee Greever

Member of the Virginia House of Delegates from the Fairfax district
- In office January 8, 1908 – March 19, 1915

Personal details
- Born: May 10, 1873 Kenmore, Fairfax County, Virginia, U.S.
- Died: November 23, 1932 (aged 59)
- Resting place: Kenmore, Fairfax County, Virginia, U.S.
- Spouse: Kate W. Brunback (m. 1892)
- Children: 4
- Education: University of Virginia
- Alma mater: University of Virginia School of Law (LLB)
- Occupation: Politician; lawyer

Walter Tansill Oliver (May 10, 1873 – November 23, 1932) was an American politician and lawyer from Virginia. He served as mayor of Fairfax, Virginia, in 1902. He represented Fairfax County, as a member of the Virginia House of Delegates from 1908 to 1915 and as a member of the Virginia Senate from 1920 to 1924.

== Early life and education ==
Oliver was born on May 10, 1873, in Kenmore in Fairfax County, Virginia, to Lucretia A. (née Tansill) and Lewis C. Oliver. He attended public schools in Kenmore and the Potomac Academy in Alexandria, Virginia. Oliver entered the University of Virginia in 1889. He studied there for two years, and then taught for three years. He entered University of Virginia School of Law in 1895, graduating with a Bachelor of Laws in 1897. He also worked as a law librarian. He was president of the Jefferson Literary Society and was a recipient of the debaters' medal from that organization. He was admitted to the bar on June 18, 1896.

== Career ==
Oliver practiced law in Fairfax, Virginia, and was elected mayor of Fairfax in 1902.

Oliver served as a member of the Virginia House of Delegates, representing Fairfax, for five sessions: from January 8 to March 27, 1908; from January 12 to March 17, 1910; from January 10 to March 15, 1912; from January 14 to March 20, 1914; and from January 13 to March 19, 1915.

Oliver served as a member of the Virginia Senate, representing Fairfax, from March 1, 1920, to February 29, 1924, succeeding Edgar Lee Greever.

== Personal life ==
Oliver married Kate W. Brunback in 1892. They had three sons and one daughter, including Lewis B. B.

Oliver got into a fight with the brother of his son's wife, Lewis Ritchie. Oliver's son Lewis B. B. was going through marital issues with his wife. After reportedly striking Ritchie with his cane, Oliver was struck in the jaw and fractured his skull on the sidewalk. Oliver died the following day, on November 23, 1932. He was buried at the family plot at Kenmore in Fairfax County, Virginia. In January 1933, Lewis Ritchie was set free for his involvement in Oliver's death.
