= Marsh House (Fairfax, Virginia) =

Historic house in Virginia, United States

- U.S. National Register of Historic Places
- U.S. Historic district – Contributing property
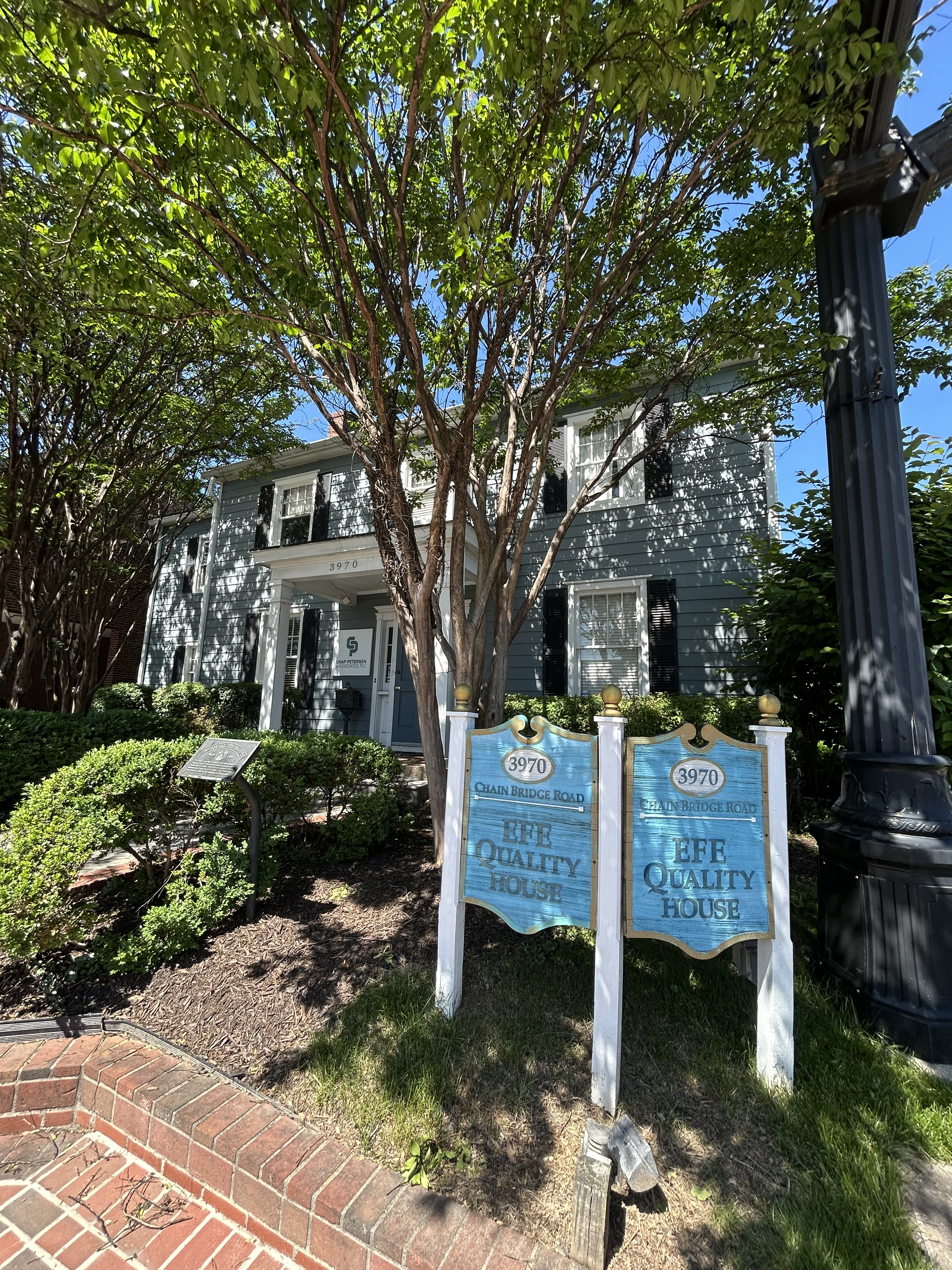
- Marsh House in 2025

- Location within Fairfax Location within Northern Virginia Location within Virginia Location within the United States
- Location: 3970 Chain Bridge Road; Fairfax, Virginia
- Coordinates: 38.8470088°N 77.3066317°W
- Built: 1930
- NRHP reference No.: 87001432

The Marsh House is a colonial revival vernacular built in 1930. It is part of the City of Fairfax Historic District and currently is used as a commercial building.
