= Victoria Stiles =

Makeup artist

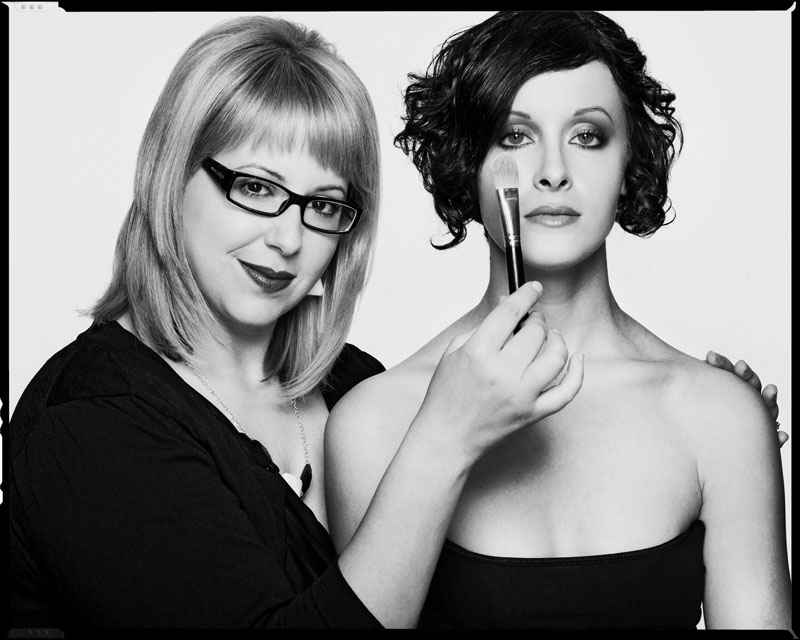
- Stiles in November 2005

Background information
- Born: October 3, 1978 (age 48); Fairfax, Virginia, U.S.
- Occupation: make-up artist
- Website: www.victoriastiles.com

Victoria Stiles (born Victoria "Vicki" Malak on October 3, 1978 in Fairfax, Virginia) is a Washington, D.C. makeup artist, who works internationally.

Stiles is recognized for her editorial makeup work in national publications such as Glamour, O: The Oprah Magazine, Vogue, and People Magazine and with celebrities Roberta Flack, Gary Sinise, Olivia Thirlby, and Emmitt Smith. Internationally, Stiles provided makeup for Jazz musician Melody Gardot's album with Verve Music Group, My One and Only Thrill.

== Early life ==
Stiles started experimenting with cosmetics at a young age. She was inspired by fashion magazines and would play with makeup in her bathroom, attempting different styles of application. A high school friend's mother, who died from breast cancer, noticed Stiles' talent and urged her to pursue a career as a makeup artist.

While attending college at George Mason University in Fairfax County, Virginia, Stiles was offered part-time employment with MAC Cosmetics, owned by the Estee Lauder Companies.

== Career ==
Under contract with MAC Cosmetics, Stiles worked on concert productions for Cher and Missy Elliott. In 2004, Stiles quit work with MAC Cosmetics to start a career as a freelance makeup artist and, shortly thereafter, connected with a Washington, DC photographer who steered her towards makeup for weddings and events.

She gained representation with T.H.E. Artist Agency, an agency representing artists in Washington, DC and owned by one of Bravo (US TV channel) The Real Housewives of Washington, D.C. cast member, Lynda Erkiletian. She began work on fashion spreads for local D.C. publications such as The Washington Post Express and Washingtonian Magazine. Washingtonian profiled Stiles in an article naming her one of Washington, D.C.'s "good makeup artists".

Over time, Stiles' credits grew to include production work as, in 2008, she was hired as the key artist for actor Gary Sinise in the notable 9/11 documentary, A Nation Remembers: The Story of the Pentagon Memorial and, during the inauguration of Barack Obama, Stiles was cast as key artist for the live broadcast of Inside Edition with Deborah Norville.

Her goal to work with the fashion industry was achieved in the spring of 2009 as she started working seasonally for New York Fashion Week designers at Bryant Park, including Rad Hourani and Alexandre Herchcovitch. Rad Hourani's key makeup artist, Hung Vanngo, mentored Stiles.

== Philanthropy ==
=== Makeovers For The Cure ===
In 1999, Stiles, and other makeup artists across the United States, engaged in a book deal with a publishing company which claimed a portion of funds from book sales would go to Stand Up 2 Cancer and Fran Drescher's fund, Cancer Schmancer, both 501(3)(c) charities. The publishing company was ruled fraudulent and the charities never received their donation. Stiles organized a team of makeup artists and created the event Makeovers For The Cure to help recoup donations for Cancer Schmancer and Stand Up 2 Cancer. A notable attendee of Makeovers For The Cure, The Real Housewives of Washington, D.C. cast member, Mary Schmidt Amons, announced her collaboration with Fran Drescher and Cancer Schmancer.

=== Creation of Memento Lip Tar ===
The Tesla Group, a marketing firm based in New York City, selected Stiles to be the Key Makeup Artist for designer Laila Azhar for the 2nd annual A.E.R. Walk With Style Event on April 1, 2010, benefiting CancerCare. Stiles partnered with David Klasfeld, owner and creator of Obsessive Compulsive Cosmetics, to create a special Lip Tar shade for the show. Proceeds from sales of the Lip Tar, named Memento, benefited the CancerCare organization.
