= Old Town Hall (Fairfax, Virginia) =

- U.S. Historic district – Contributing property
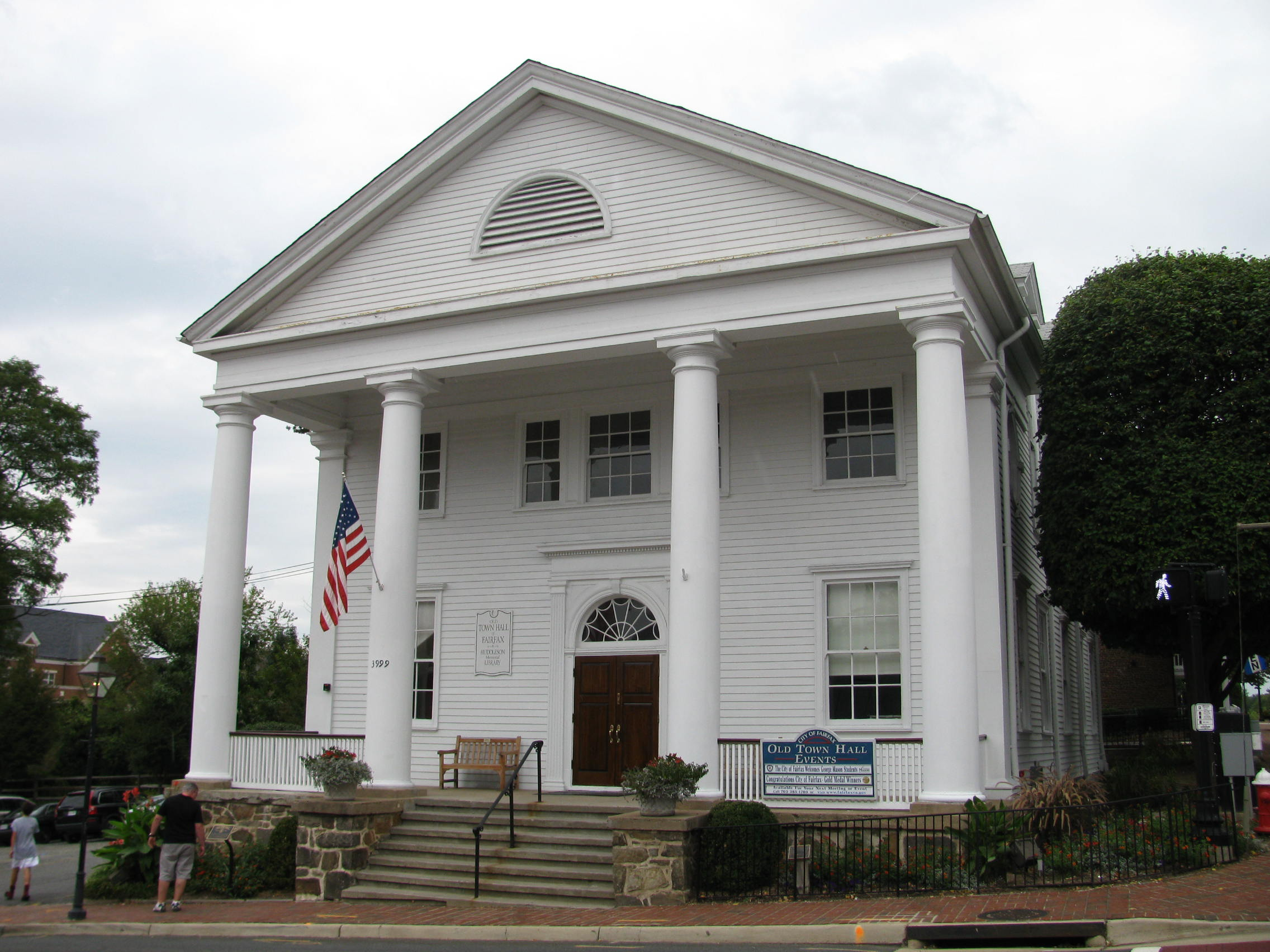

- Location within Fairfax Location within Northern Virginia Location within Virginia Location within the United States
- Location: 3995 University Drive; Fairfax, Virginia
- Coordinates: 38°50′45.95″N 77°18′18.62″W
- Built: 1900
- Architectural style: Colonial Revival
- Part of: City of Fairfax Historic District (ID87001432)
- Added to NRHP: August 27, 1987

Old Town Hall is a classical revival style hall that was built in 1900 by Joseph E. Willard and subsequently donated by him to Fairfax, Virginia. Built by Arthur Thompson, a local contractor, the building retains much of its original woodwork. Old Town Hall’s second level houses the Huddleson Library and is home to the Fairfax Art League.

The hall was added to the National Register of Historic Places in 1987 as part of the City of Fairfax Historic District.
