= DonorSee =

Humanitarian crowdfunding platform

Donorsee
- Website type: Crowdfunding
- Available in: English
- Founded: 2016
- Headquarters: Fairfax Station, Virginia, United States
- Industry: Charity
- Website: www.donorsee.com
- Current status: Active

DonorSee is a humanitarian crowdfunding platform that is intended to allow donors to quickly and easily help people in the world's poorest countries. The platform lets donors see how their money makes an impact through raw video updates. The company is based in Fairfax Station, Virginia.

== History ==
The company was founded in March 2016 by Gret Glyer, in response to what he saw as poor management of aid money by large aid organisations. Glyer raised $150,000 in seed funding to build the platform on web, iOS and Android and launched it on 26 September 2016. Two weeks after launch, Glyer appeared on the Tom Woods show to talk about DonorSee. In October 2016, DonorSee was listed in USA Today as one of the best ways to give to those affected by Hurricane Matthew in Haiti.

On January 26, 2017, the Peace Corps issued a ban preventing their volunteers from using DonorSee. Glyer subsequently initiated a Change.org petition asking that President Trump shall intervene and lift the ban.

On June 24, 2022, Glyer was shot dead in his home. Police investigated the shooting as a homicide.

== Business model ==
DonorSee allows aid workers to build a donor base by posting a feed of projects specific to the country they are serving. During this process, members post a picture or video of the potential recipient and a story explaining how the money will be used, along with the amount of money needed. They also have the option to say which country the project is in, and whether or not they want to raise money on a monthly basis. After posting, people can donate directly to projects using a debit or credit card, which is processed by Stripe. Stripe charges a fee averaging 2.9% per donation and DonorSee takes 0% on most projects. After the project is funded, aid workers are expected to post visual follow-up, which often includes the donor's name in the video.
