= Marshall Hall, Maryland =

Historic house in Maryland, United States

- Marshall Hall
- U.S. National Register of Historic Places
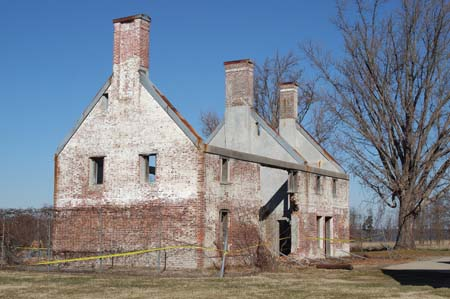

- Location within Maryland Location within the United States
- Location: 5 miles north of Maryland Routes 210 and 227, Bryans Road, Maryland
- Coordinates: 38°41′6″N 77°5′55″W
- Area: 10 acres (4.0 ha)
- Built: 1725
- NRHP reference No.: 76000152
- Added to NRHP: May 12, 1976

Marshall Hall, Maryland is the site of the Marshall family mansion. It is now part of Piscataway Park operated by the National Park Service. Marshall Hall is located near Bryans Road in Charles County, Maryland, next to the Potomac River, more or less across from Mount Vernon, Virginia, the home of George Washington. The home was one of the finest built on the Maryland shore of the Potomac in the early 18th century. The Marshall family were minor gentry and owned as many as 80 slaves by the early 19th century.

Soldiers playing poker at Camp McKibbin, located at Marshall Hall, in 1893.

Soon after the Civil War, the site became a highly frequented picnic ground because of its proximity to Mount Vernon. Steamship lines, originally established to ferry tourists from Washington D.C. and Alexandria to/from Mount Vernon, discovered a new source of revenue in the park across from the historic estate. In the 1880s, the Mount Vernon and Marshall Hall Steamboat Company ran large ships between Washington, Alexandria, Mount Vernon and Marshall Hall: the round-trip fare at that time was $1, and included admission to Mount Vernon. Washingtonians fled the summer heat of the city for all sorts of events at the picnic grounds, from exclusive catered events to popular cultural events such as a swimming exhibition given by the daredevil Robert Emmet Odlum in the summer of 1878, seven years before his death at the Brooklyn Bridge. Marshall Hall later became one of the first amusement parks in the Washington, D.C., area in the 1890s, offering numerous "appliances of entertainment" (as one deed described them) for visitors who wanted to do more than picnic, many of them arriving by river boat. Starting in the 1870s, annual jousting tournaments took place at the site. New attractions were added throughout the 20th century, and gambling became a major draw for a while after World War II. Between 1949 and 1968, the Southern Maryland area offered the only legal slot machines in the United States outside of Nevada.

The National Park Service gained control of the park after Congress, acting upon a request from the Mount Vernon Ladies' Association, mandated that the views from Mt. Vernon had to be protected and returned to something resembling the days when George Washington sat on his colonnaded porch and looked across the Potomac. The term "historic viewshed" was coined for this act of preservation. The Park Service tore down all vestiges of the amusement park in 1980, whose popularity had declined due to competition by much larger, newer parks. A fire destroyed much of the colonial house soon after. In January 2003, a truck driver slammed his rig through the remaining hulk. The damage done to the brick shell was repaired the following year.
