= Ratcliffe–Logan–Allison House =

Historic house in Virginia, United States

- Ratcliffe–Logan–Allison House/Earp's Ordinary
- U.S. National Register of Historic Places
- U.S. Historic district – Contributing property
- Virginia Landmarks Register
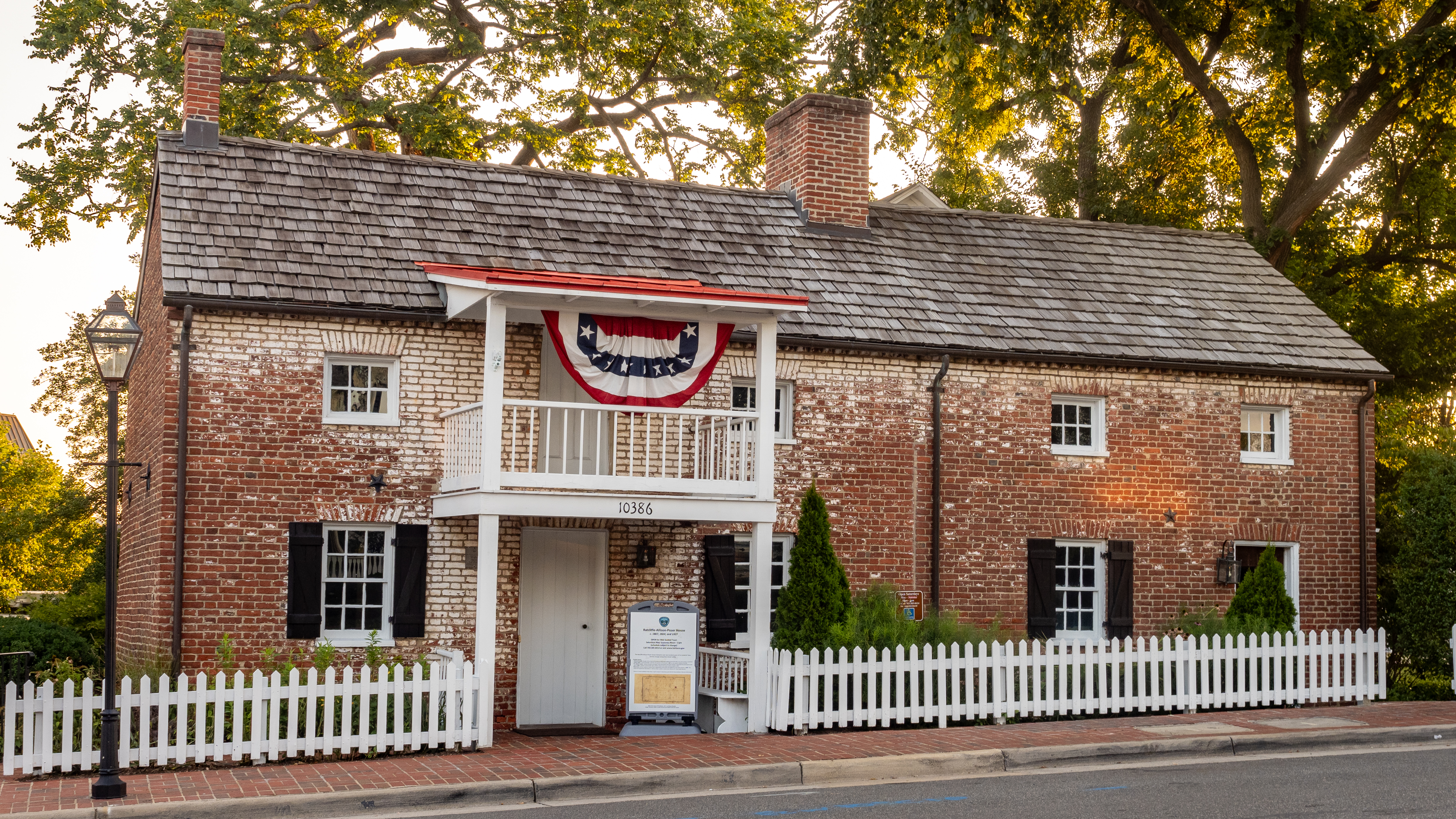
- Ratcliffe-Logan-Allison House

- Location within Fairfax Location within Northern Virginia Location within Virginia Location within the United States
- Location: 200 E. Main St., Fairfax, Virginia
- Coordinates: 38°50′45″N 77°18′18″W
- Area: 9.9 acres (4.0 ha)
- Built: c. 1810, c. 1830
- Part of: Moorefield Historic District (ID86000774); City of Fairfax Historic District (ID8700143)
- NRHP reference No.: 73002209
- VLR No.: 151-0002

Significant dates
- Added to NRHP: February 16, 1973
- Designated NRHP: January 15, 1986
- Designated CP: August 27, 1987
- Designated VLR: January 16, 1973

The Ratcliffe-Allison-Pozer House is a historic home located in the City of Fairfax, Virginia. This charming brick house is the City's oldest residence in the Town of Providence, which later became the Town of Fairfax. The house is owned and operated as a historic house museum by the City of Fairfax. Guided tours are offered where daily activities of some of its twelve owners and occupants are interpreted for visitors, illustrating commercial and domestic change along Main Street during the 19th and 20th centuries.

The house has been known by many names. In the mid 20th century, the house was named Earp’s Ordinary, because it was assumed that the house had served as an inn operated by Caleb Earp. This assumption has been disproved by later scholarship. There was never an inn on this site, nor did Caleb Earp ever run an ordinary in Fairfax. Later names for the home attribute ownership correctly such as Ratcliffe-Allison house, Ratcliffe-Logan-Allison house, and the Ratcliffe-Allison-Pozer house. The house consists of two sections, the first built about 1807 and the second about 1824. A two-story rear wing connected by a hyphen was added in the 20th century.

It was listed on the National Register of Historic Places in 1973. It is located in the City of Fairfax Historic District.
