= Marshall Hall (amusement park) =

Former amusement park at Marshall Hall, Maryland, US

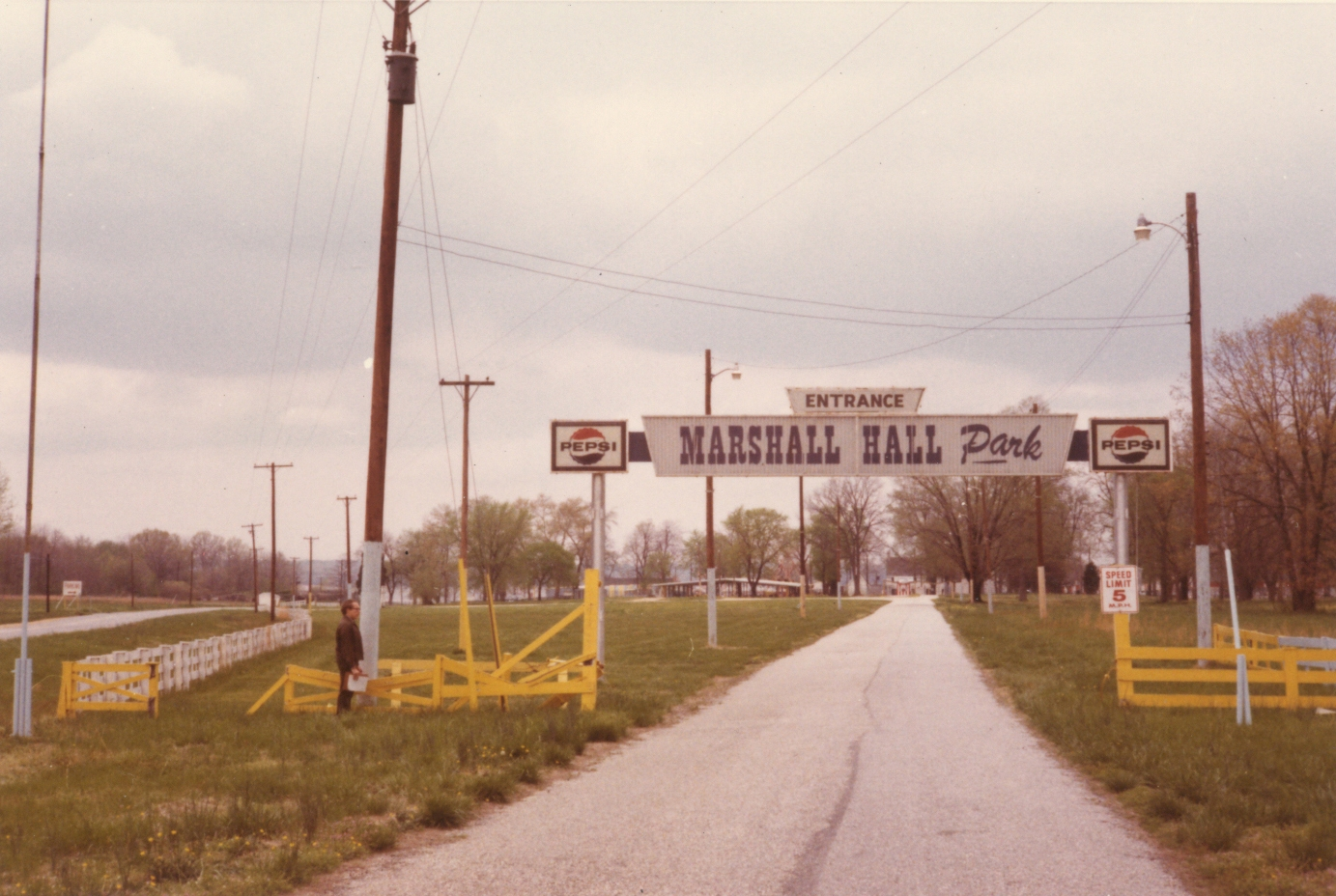
- Marshall Hall entry gate
- Location: Marshall Hall, Maryland, U.S.
- Status: Defunct
- Opened: 1920s
- Closed: 1980

Marshall Hall was an amusement park at Marshall Hall, Maryland, located diagonally south from Mount Vernon, Virginia (the home of George Washington) on the banks of the Potomac River. The site of a small amusement park opened in the early 1920s and included a small wooden roller coaster. A larger wooden roller coaster was built in its place in 1950. The coaster was destroyed by tornado force winds in July 1977 and was the beginning of the end for the park. Marshall Hall as an amusement park closed in 1980. It was a favorite of Washington, D.C. residents who often arrived by excursion boat.

The large brick stable and brick carriage house that once stood on the property were demolished to give way to a picnic pavilion. All that is left standing is Marshall Hall, the shell of the colonial home of the original Marshall family.

== Image gallery ==
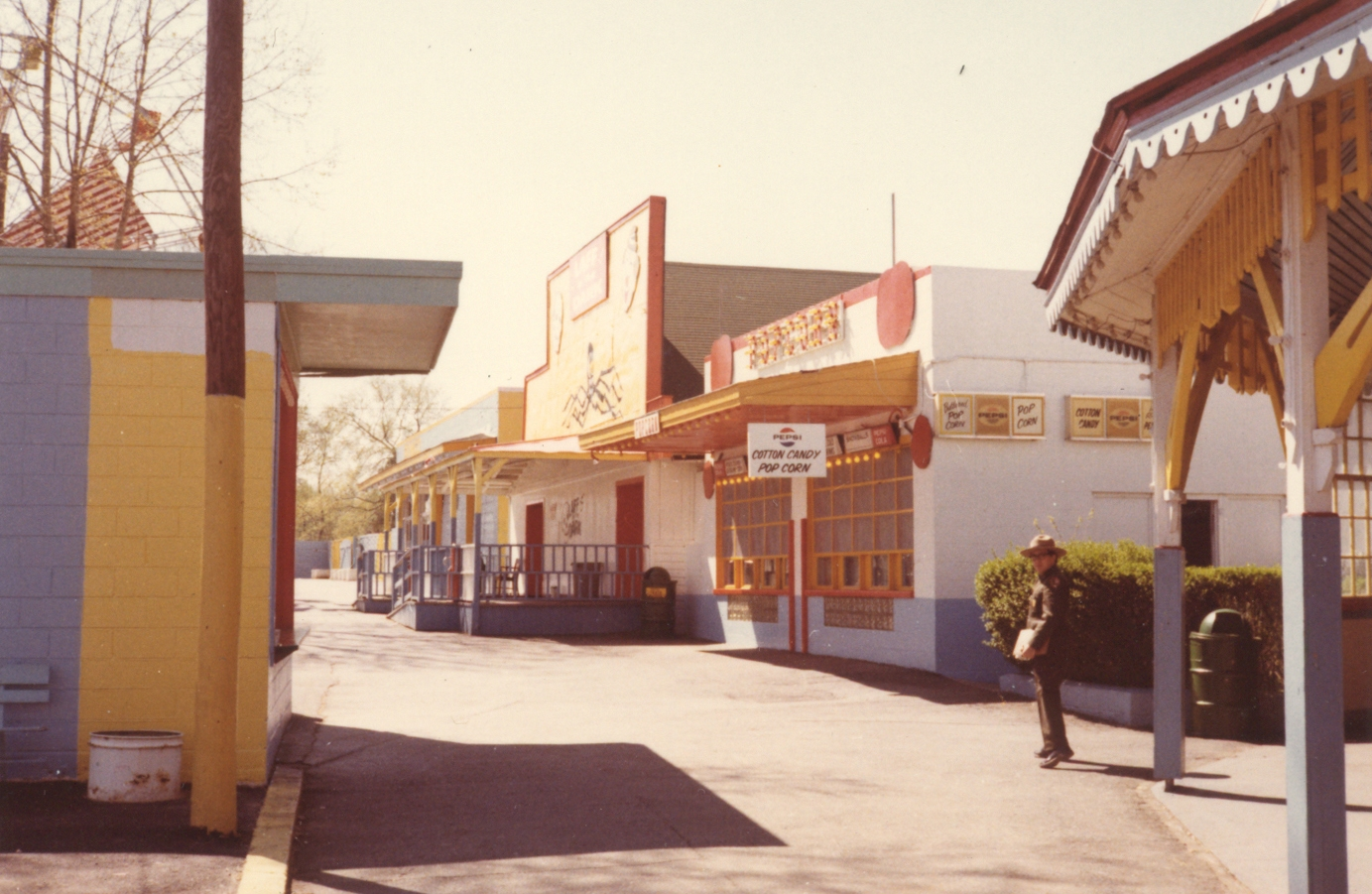
Midway

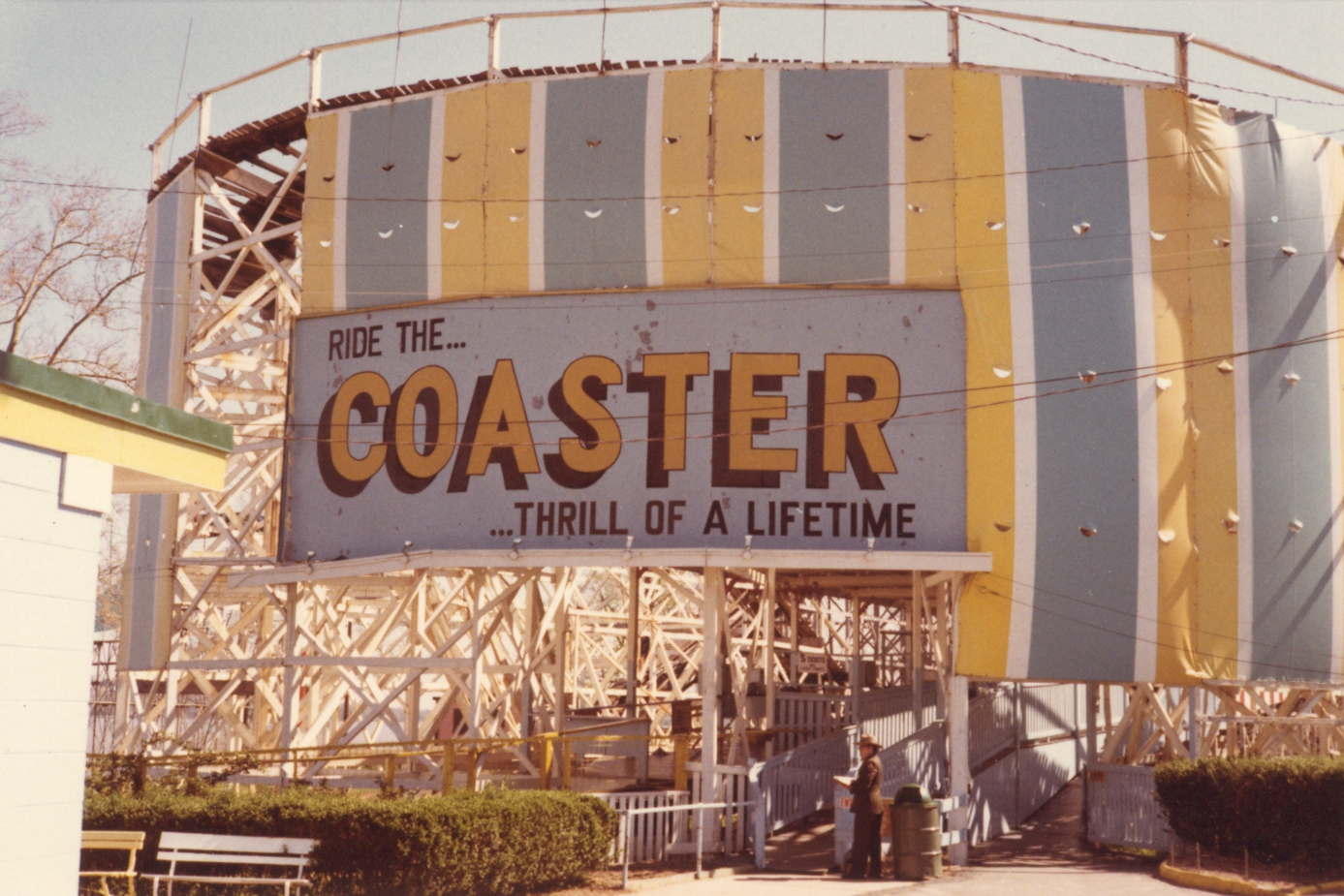
Coaster (1950-1977)

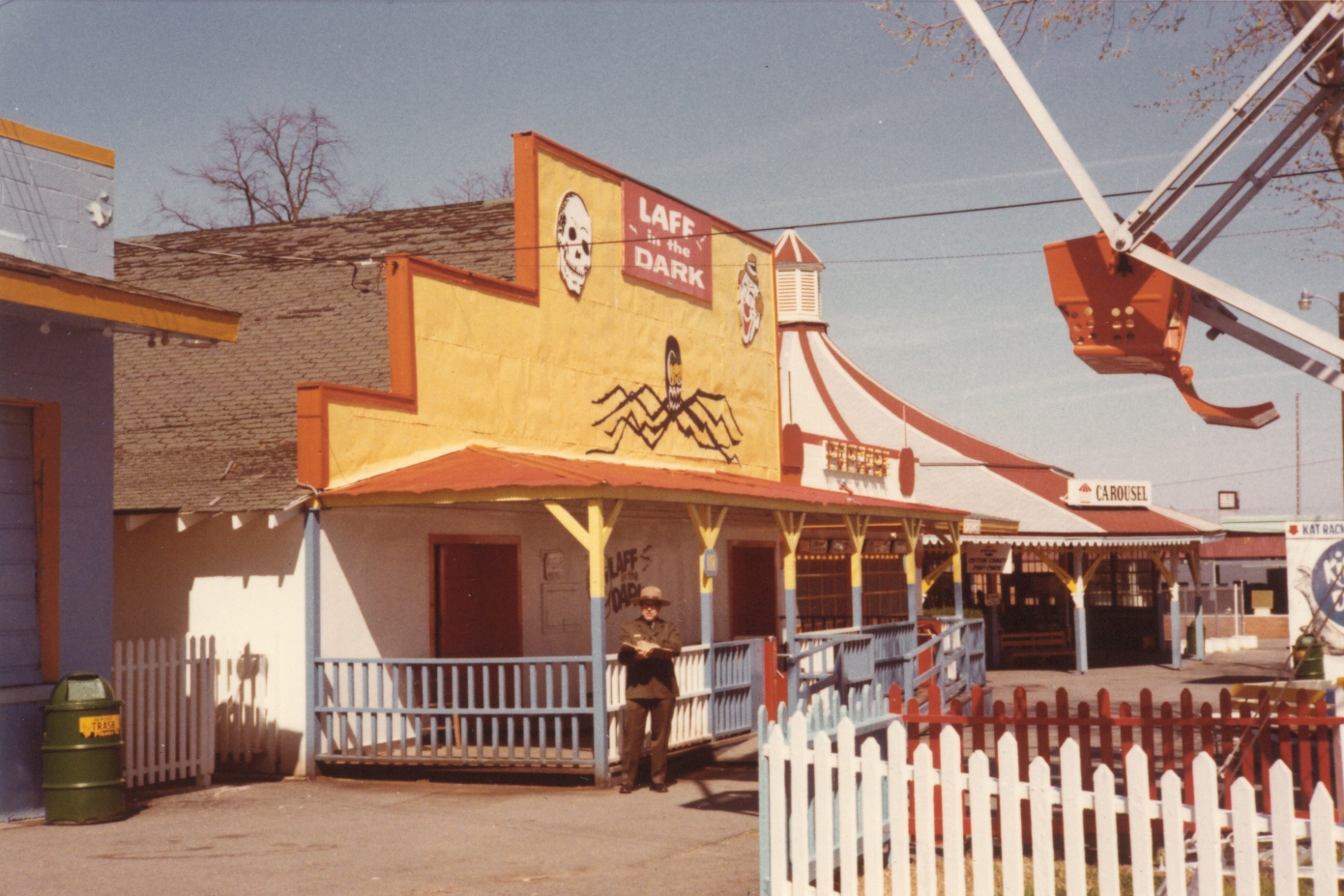
Laff in the Dark

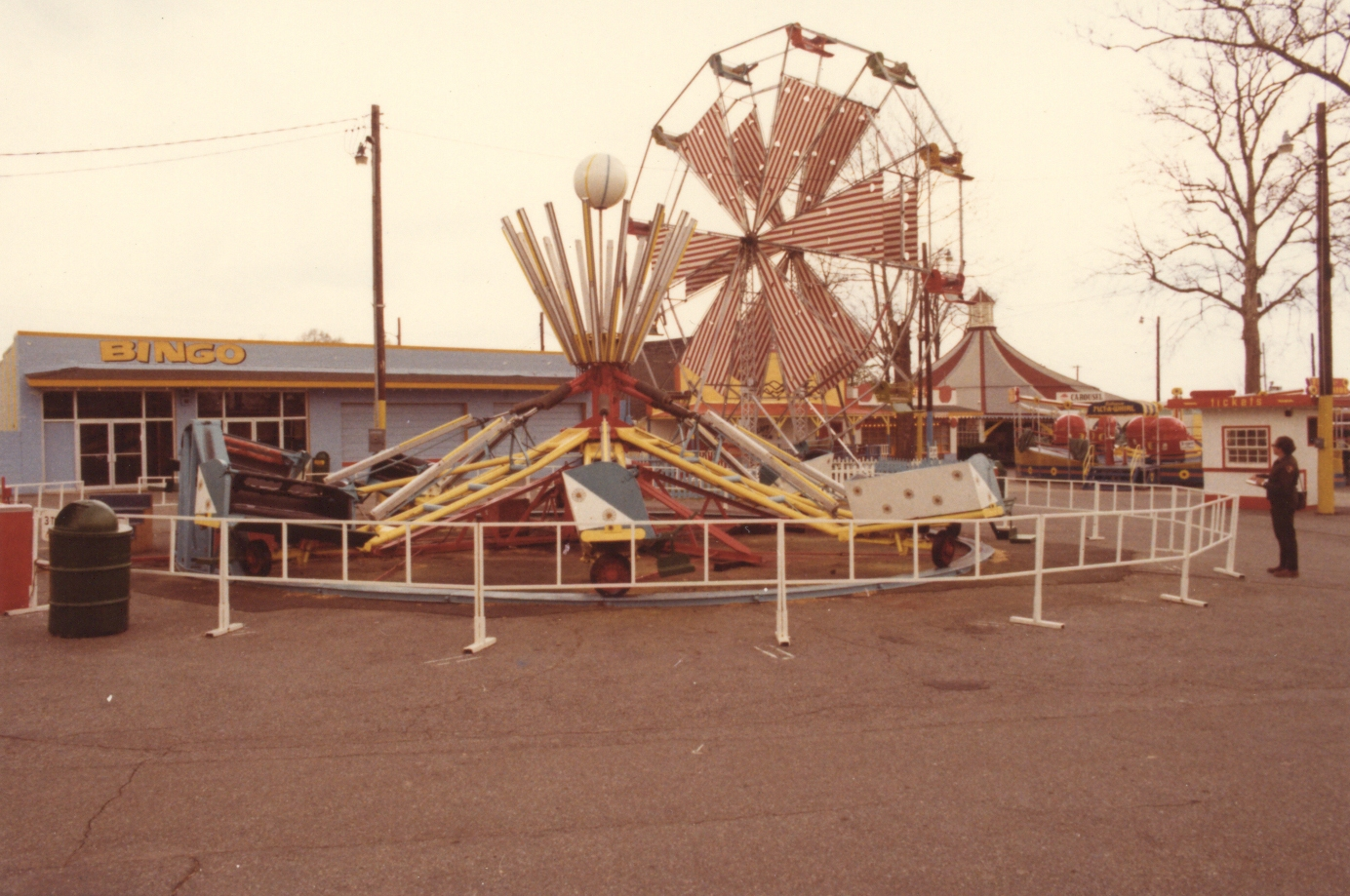
Flying Coaster
