= Fairfax Public School (Old Fairfax Elementary School Annex) =

- U.S. National Register of Historic Places
- Virginia Landmarks Register
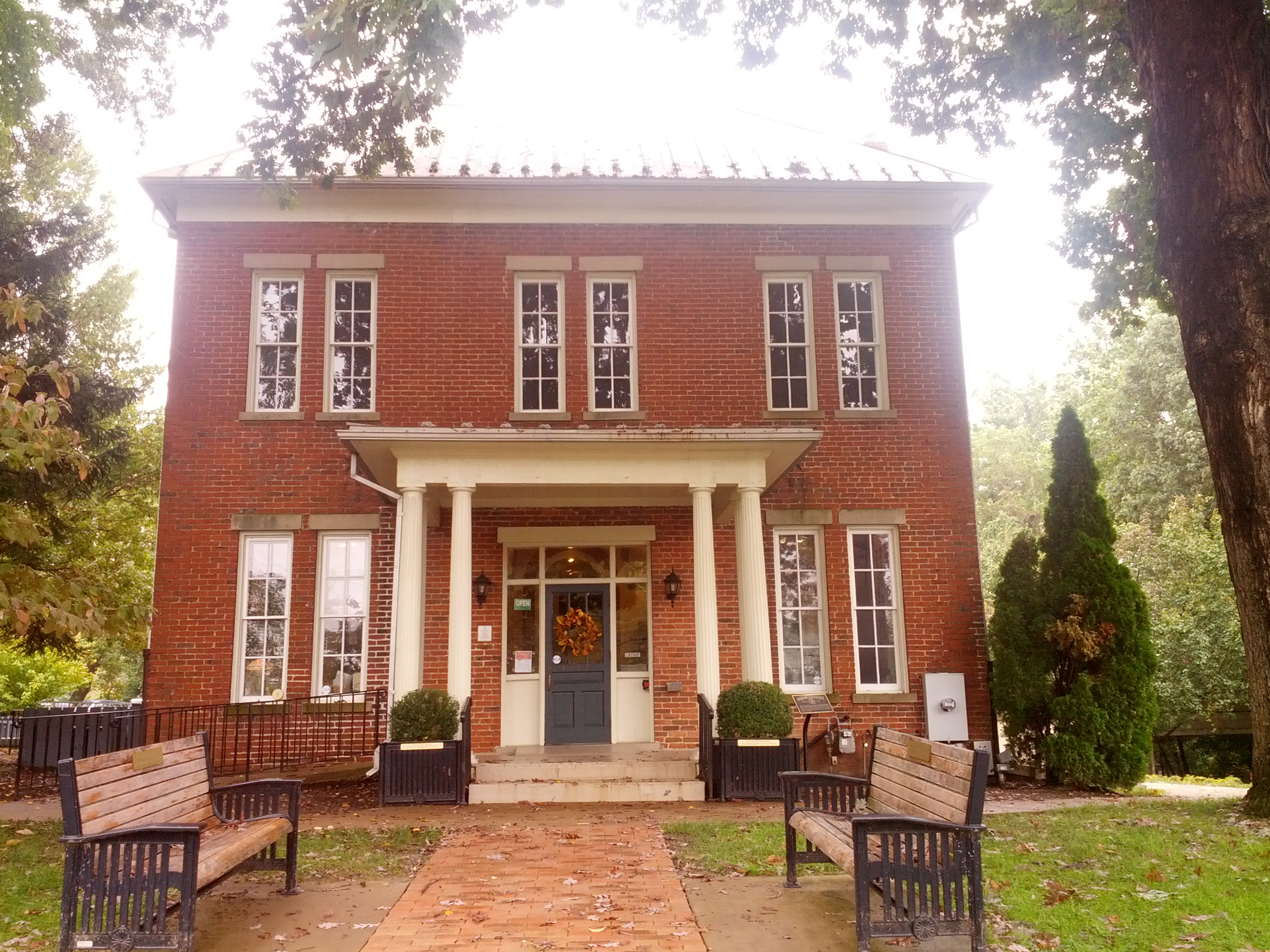
- The Old Fairfax Elementary School Annex, now the Fairfax Visitor Center and Museum

- Location within Fairfax Location within Northern Virginia Location within Virginia Location within the United States
- Location: 10209 Main St., Fairfax, Virginia
- Coordinates: 38°50′40″N 77°18′4″W
- Area: 1 acre (0.40 ha)
- Built: 1873, 1912
- Architectural style: Classical Revival, Italianate
- NRHP reference No.: 92001367
- VLR No.: 151-0038

Significant dates
- Added to NRHP: October 21, 1992
- Designated VLR: April 22, 1992

Fairfax Public School, also known as the Old Fairfax Elementary School Annex, is a historic school building located at Fairfax, Virginia. It consists of two sections built in 1873 and 1912, and is a two-story, brick building. The original section lies at the rear of the building, which was later fronted by the two-story, rectangular, hipped roof section. The front facade features a one-story, Classical Revival style portico supported by three fluted Doric order columns at each corner. The building now houses the Fairfax Museum and Visitors Center.

It was listed on the National Register of Historic Places in 1992.

== History ==
Built in 1873, the building was the first Fairfax Elementary School, and the first brick public school in Fairfax County, Virginia. It was used as a school until 1925 when the building was purchased by the Ku Klux Klan chapter, Cavaliers of Virginia, Inc.

The cost of construction was $2,750.

A fire damaged the building in 1932, which was repaired in 1937 when the Fairfax County School Board purchased and began using it as a school again. The county held its first special education classes there in the 1950s, after which it was used as a school administration building and then as part of the Northern Virginia Police Academy.

== Fairfax Museum and Visitor Center ==
The Fairfax Museum and Visitor Center opened on July 4, 1992, featuring exhibits covering Fairfax and Northern Virginia history. Prior to opening, the building underwent renovations for just under 5 years, which was publicly funded through a city referendum.
