= City of Fairfax Historic District =

Historic district in Virginia, United States

- U.S. National Register of Historic Places
- U.S. Historic district
- Virginia Landmarks Register
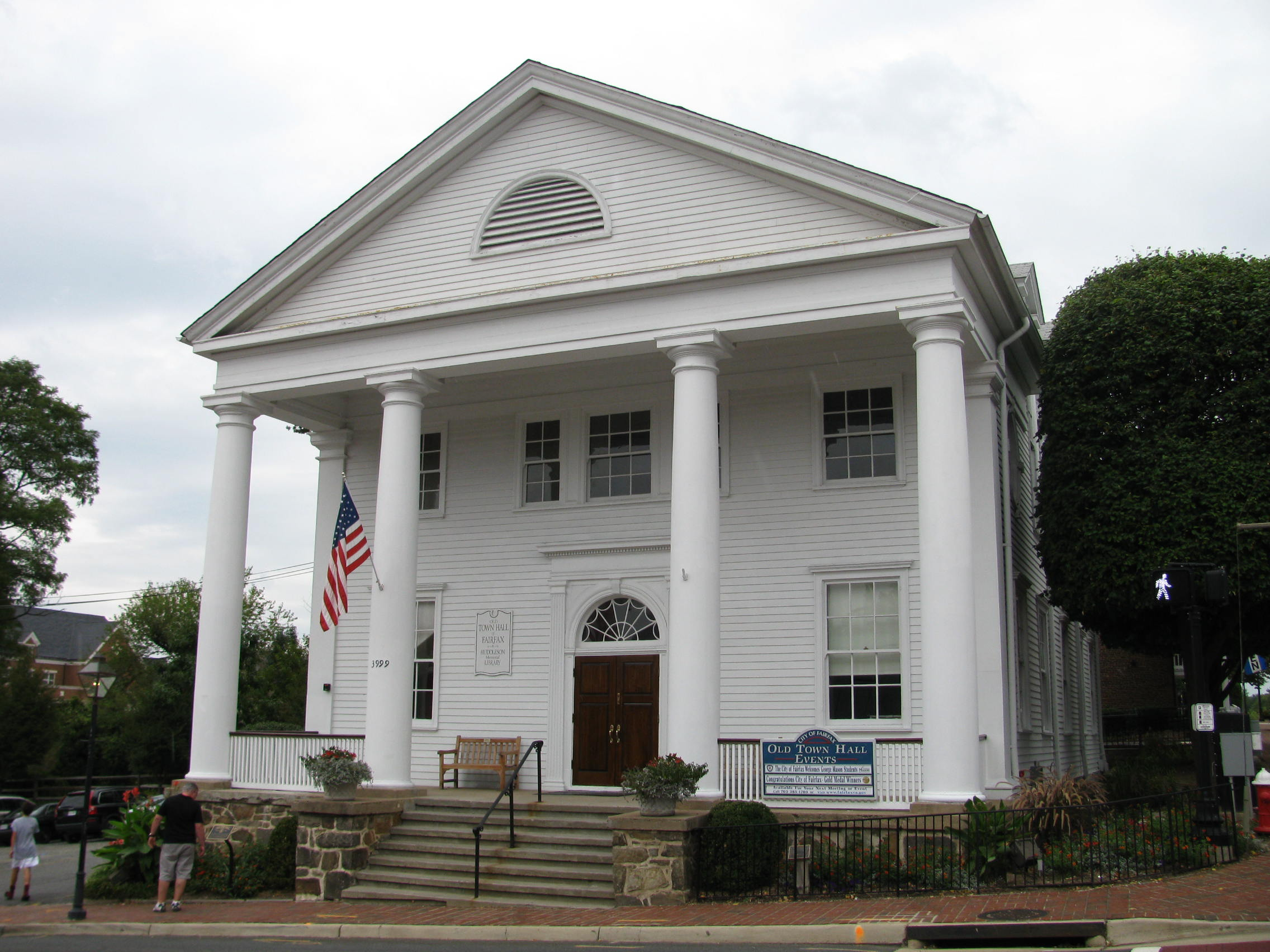
- Old Town Hall

- Location within Fairfax Location within Northern Virginia Location within Virginia Location within the United States
- Location: Jct. of VA 236 and VA 123, Fairfax, Virginia
- Coordinates: 38°50′46.54″N 77°18′23.75″W
- Area: 24 acres (9.7 ha)
- Architect: Multiple
- Architectural style: Late 19th and 20th Century Revivals, Queen Anne
- NRHP reference No.: 87001432
- VLR No.: 151-0003

Significant dates
- Added to NRHP: August 27, 1987
- Designated VLR: October 14, 1986

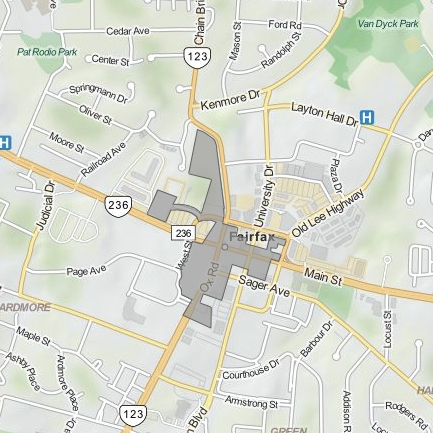
Area of the Fairfax Historic District

The City of Fairfax Historic District is a national historic district located at Fairfax, Virginia. It encompasses 28 contributing buildings in the central business district of Fairfax. Notable buildings include the Old Town Hall, which was built in 1900; the Barbour Building; First National Bank of Fairfax; Ford Building; Marsh House; McHugh & Hoffman Building; Rust Building; and Truro Church. Located in the district are the separately listed Historic Fairfax County Courthouse, Old Fairfax County Jail, and Ratcliffe-Logan-Allison House.

It was listed on the National Register of Historic Places in 1987.
