= Historic Fairfax County Courthouse =

Historic courthouse in Virginia, United States

- Fairfax County Courthouse
- U.S. National Register of Historic Places
- U.S. Historic district – Contributing property
- Virginia Landmarks Register
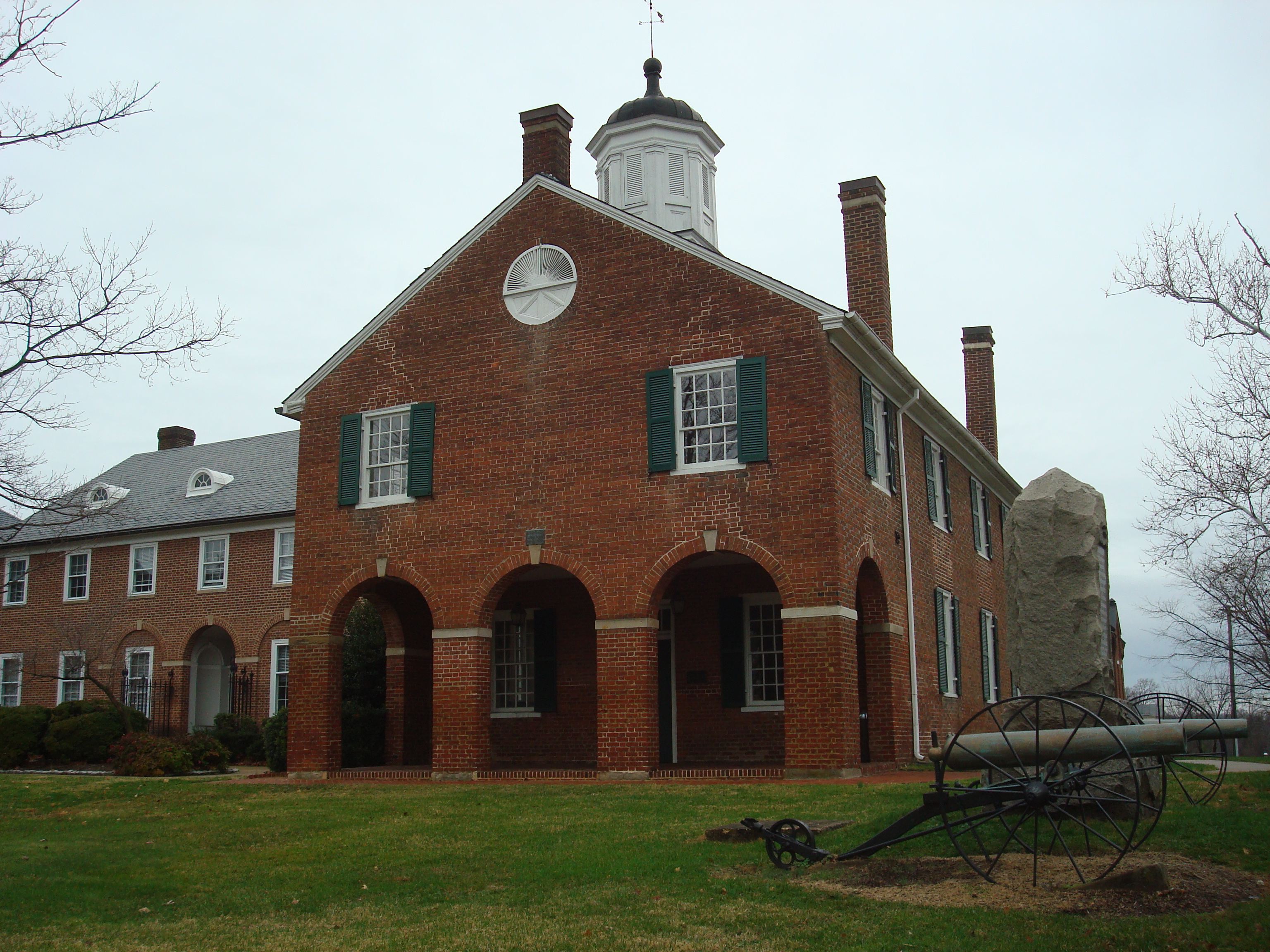
- View from east of Fairfax County Courthouse

- Location within Fairfax Location within Northern Virginia Location within Virginia Location within the United States
- Location: 4000 Chain Bridge Road; Fairfax, Virginia
- Coordinates: 38.8461°N 77.3071°W
- Area: less than one acre
- Built: 1799; 227 years ago
- Architect: James Wren
- Architectural style: Early Republic, Roman Revival
- Part of: City of Fairfax Historic District (ID8700143)
- NRHP reference No.: 74002235
- VLR No.: 151-0003-0001

Significant dates
- Added to NRHP: May 3, 1974
- Designated CP: August 27, 1987
- Designated VLR: October 20, 1973, November 18, 1980

The Historic Fairfax County Courthouse is one of the oldest buildings in the City of Fairfax, Virginia. It was constructed in 1799 to serve as the seat of government in Fairfax County. During the American Civil War, the first Confederate officer casualty of the war took place on the courthouse grounds and the building was occupied by both sides in the conflict. Today, the original courthouse building is part of the larger courthouse site that serves the local government of Fairfax County.

== Early days of Fairfax County ==
When Virginia's county court system was established in 1619, important issues handled by it included determining local tax rates, licensing mills and inns, providing for road construction and repair, and generally administering local government. Fairfax County built its first courthouse in 1742 at a site called "Spring Field", which is near present-day Tysons Corner. By the middle of the eighteenth century, the city of Alexandria, Virginia, had established itself as one of the major ports of the region for coastal and oceangoing ships, and in the year 1752, the courthouse for the Fairfax County court system moved there. In November 1789, realizing the County of Fairfax was in need of a new courthouse building, a legislative petition was arranged in Alexandria. The petition requested the courthouse be placed in the center of Fairfax County, a more convenient location for citizens of the area, in order to promote trade and commerce. Shortly after, the court ordered that the sheriff collect thirty-five cents for each taxable person in Fairfax County to pay for the construction of the new courthouse.

Businessmen in the vicinity of the proposed site for the new structure were assured its arrival would bring an increase in business to the area. The present location of the courthouse was selected and purchased from Richard Ratcliffe for one dollar. In May 1799, after the land had been laid out by a man named William Payne, the court ordered the construction of a courthouse forty by thirty feet "with sixteen feet pitch with a twelve foot Portico, one (jail) forty feet by twenty…one clerks office twenty four feet by eighteen…and one (jailers) House twenty four feet by eighteen." The jail would have three rooms on the first floor and two on the second, with an addition on the back. The clerk's office should be "arched over with Slate or Tile," which can be assumed was for fire protection. There was also to be stocks, a pillory and whipping post. Two men, John Bogue and Mungo Dykes were hired as the contractors. The architect of the building was to be James Wren.

== Antebellum courthouse ==
The District of Columbia was founded in 1800. In March of that year, following the adjournment of the Court in Alexandria, a notice was released announcing that the County Court would be held at the new courthouse in "the center of the County, where all suitors, and others having business, are hereby notified to attend, on the third Monday of April next." On April 21 the first court session was held at the new building. The first order of business was to record the will of Corbin Washington, nephew of George Washington and brother of Judge Bushrod Washington, a Supreme Court Justice between 1798 and 1829. Corbin had been married to Hannah Lee, a daughter of Richard Henry Lee. Thomas Mason, son of George Mason, was present at a poll of voters taken two days later. With his design of the new courthouse, James Wren departed from the traditional single-story plan of most Virginia courthouses, and produced a two-story building with the courtroom on the ground floor and jury rooms over the arched arcade.

No precise descriptions of the interior of the courthouse have surfaced, but it was customary for a large table to be centered in the main chamber of the courthouse. This table was usually spacious enough to seat the sheriff and justices of the county court, and it is likely that the courthouse followed this same layout. It was also customary to separate the portion of the court occupied by the public, which was done by the installation of a wooden railing or a partition. Fireplaces likely heated the courtroom chamber and the second floor jury room. The new courthouse complex gradually became the center of activity for the county, and in 1805 the area around the new structure became known as the Town of Providence. The location of the new courthouse was ideal, being located at the junction of Little River Turnpike and Ox Road (present day routes 236 and 123) and providing easy access to most parts of the county.

Attorneys generally rented rooms in the Willcoxon hotel near the courthouse and used them as their offices, advertising their services in the Alexandria Gazette. The town of Providence was called Fairfax Court House during the Civil War years, until it was incorporated as the Town of Fairfax in 1875. By the beginning of the nineteenth century, the land around the courthouse had been leveled and a fence was erected around the property. By December 1802 local officials deemed it necessary to create legislation to forbid sellers of liquors to set up booths on the public lot. In 1803 a plan was presented to the court for a poorhouse. One was soon erected, and land was set aside for its use. Gallows were erected at "Race Field" on the east side of the house occupied by Patrick McCarty on land owned by Richard Ratcliffe. In 1810 after the old jail located on the courthouse grounds burned, the new jail was built at a cost of $2, 486.

In general, the cases presented before the county justices were often an indication of the tenor of the times and of a personal nature. For example, John Hugely appeared before the court with two witnesses who testified that the upper part of his left ear had been bitten off in a fight. Another man, William Johnston, was accused of stealing one linen shirt, one pair of pantaloons, one shawl, and one pair of stockings, and was sentenced to ten lashes at the public whipping post. One major source of income for Fairfax residents come from selling or hiring out the enslaved people they owned. Frequent slave auctions were also held at the front door of the Fairfax courthouse. In 1800, the Reverend Jeremiah Moore, no longer confined to jail, was granted permission to preach in the courthouse; in 1801 blacks were forbidden to play fives or other games within the enclosure. As construction of turnpike roads linking Alexandria and Washington to the Shenandoah Valley took place, activity that centered in Fairfax County's courthouse square increased. On the courthouse grounds, businessmen mingled with others who came merely to exchange news and see friends. In the nineteenth century, much of the social and economic life of rural Virginia grew up around the monthly or quarterly "court days".

== During the Civil War ==
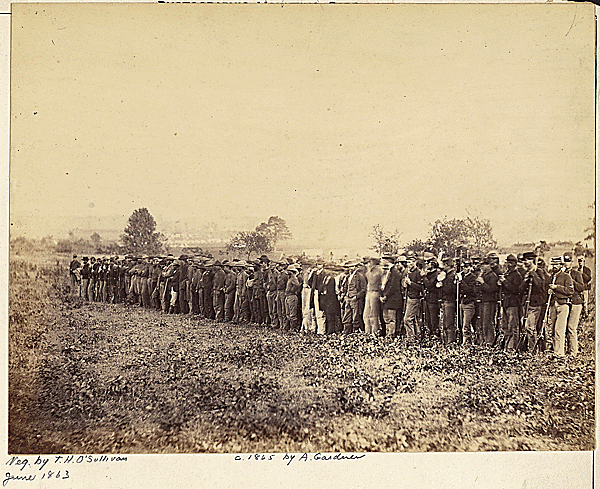
Confederate prisoners held at Fairfax in June 1863. Photograph by Timothy H. O'Sullivan.

Approximately 300 citizens lived in the vicinity of Fairfax Court House when the American Civil War began in April 1861. That same month, Company D of the 17th Regiment of Virginia Infantry, which would become known as the Fairfax Rifles, was mustered into service on the courthouse grounds. In May of that year, a small number of Confederates, under the command of Lieutenant Colonel Richard Ewell, occupied Fairfax Court House. One group of Confederates was encamped at the Zion Church in town. Another group was camping on the courthouse lot, and another, under command of Captain John Quincy Marr, was camped at a Methodist church just south of the courthouse. Marr was a graduate of Virginia Military Institute in 1846, where he was second in his class. He had served as a delegate from Fauquier County to the Virginia Convention that approved the secession resolution the previous April. Captain Marr was in charge of approximately ninety men, known as the Warrenton Rifles, as they camped near the courthouse late in May 1861. On the evening of May 31, he was sleeping in the clerk's building on the courthouse grounds.

=== First Confederate casualty ===
Company B of the Second United States Cavalry, numbering around eighty men, were scouting the area around Fairfax Court House on the evening of the thirty-first. Around 3 AM, Confederate pickets to the northeast of town engaged the cavalry and the southern troops were routed. As the Union cavalry approached the courthouse, a firefight ensued with the Confederate troops stationed there. There was much confusion and panic during the skirmish, and at some point during the fight, Captain Marr was killed. His body was discovered on the courthouse grounds by a local slave the next morning. Much speculation surrounds his death. Some historians believe it was a stray bullet that caused the fatal wound, and others even say the bullet was from friendly fire. Regardless, however, with his death, Marr became the first Confederate officer killed during the American Civil War.

=== Courthouse changes hands ===
The courthouse first came under the control of Northern troops a month later as Union General Irvin McDowell began moving his 37,000 man army west toward Manassas on July 18, 1861. Manassas would become the site of the first major battle of the war. By the spring of 1862 the courthouse had ceased to function as a center for legal business and was simply used as a military outpost.

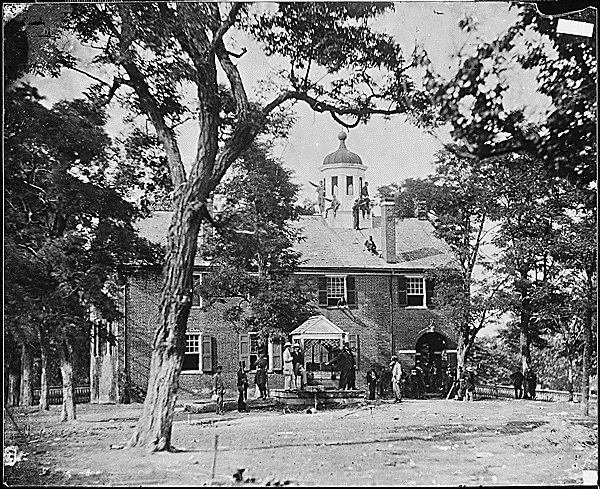
Union soldiers at Fairfax County Courthouse in June 1863. Photograph by Timothy H O'Sullivan.

Fairfax Court House would come under control of Southern troops again during a portion of 1862, but by the end of that year, Union troops again had control of the area, and would remain in possession of it until the end of the war. Period photographs of the courthouse building show it being used as a lookout point and station for Northern patrols. Other descriptions indicate that the courthouse was ransacked, its furnishings removed, and the interior generally gutted so that only the walls and roof remained. For all practical purposes, the courthouse and its related buildings were, in the years 1863 and 1864, a military outpost and minor headquarters in the Union army's system to protect its supply and communications lines from the irregular troops who kept hostilities constantly smoldering in Northern Virginia. Many important documents related to the legal proceedings of Fairfax County that were held in the courthouse were destroyed during the war years.

One item of particular importance to the courthouse was actually spared. When Confederate troops withdrew from Fairfax Court House in the fall of 1861, the will of George Washington, which was held at the courthouse, was secretly removed from the building by the court clerk, Alfred Moss, and taken to Richmond, Virginia. Here it was placed for safekeeping with the Secretary of the Commonwealth of Virginia. Following the end of the Civil War, it was returned to Fairfax. Martha Washington's will, also held at the courthouse, was not removed but remained there during the time it was occupied by Union troops. In late 1862, a group of soldiers were engaged in shoveling out the debris from the floor. According to some recollections, a Union lieutenant grew curious about some of the papers in the building, and upon examination, realized some included the will of Martha Washington, so he took it with him. The will would appear again in 1903 in England where the lieutenant was said to have sold it to a man named J.P. Morgan. The will remained in the Morgan family until it was returned to Fairfax County at some point during the twentieth century.

== End of the war to the 20th century ==
During the later years of the Civil War, when Northern troops occupied the courthouse, the jail adjacent to the building was used as a storehouse and a holding cell for military prisoners. After fire destroyed the jail in 1884, a new structure was built a year later. The jailer had his living quarters in the front portion of this new building, which served as his residence until 1948. The building itself ceased to be used for detention of prisoners shortly after that time. Since 1956, the old jail building has been used for offices of various county agencies, including the juvenile court and probation office, civil defense office, fire board, police dispatcher, and recreation department. In the past century, the traditional courthouse square was altered by the addition of new wings to the historic 1800 building. These additions, constructed in 1929 and 1953, extend the courthouse square southward to form the present large E-shaped building. During these renovations, a small brick office, built in 1870 for the Clerk of the Court and other county officials, was torn down. For a time, all major county offices were housed in the new courthouse addition. In 1969, a fifteen-story county office building was built immediately southwest of the old courthouse building, to provide space for the Board of Supervisors and many extended county offices. In addition to housing the courts, the courthouse also serves as a place for recording and storing records of deeds and wills. The original wills of George and Martha Washington are currently on display in the County Court Clerk's office. The Historic Fairfax County Courthouse and Jail were added to the National Register of Historic Places in 1981. It is located in the City of Fairfax Historic District.

== Historic courthouse today ==
Today, the original courthouse building and the subsequent additions serve the Circuit Court, General District Court, and Juvenile and Domestic Relations of Fairfax County.
