= Fairfax, Virginia =

Independent city in Virginia, United States

- Independent city
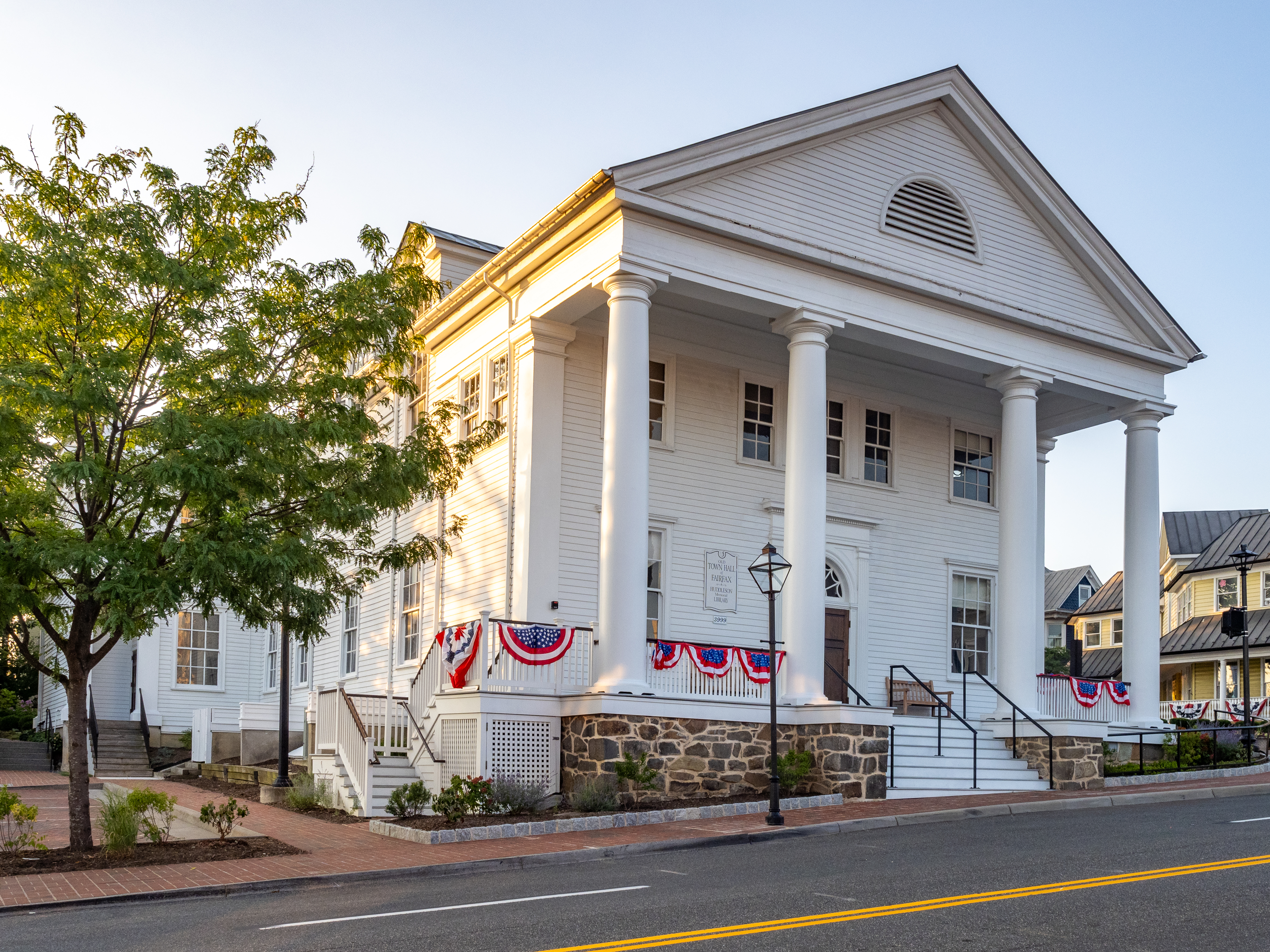
- Fairfax's Old Town Hall in 2024

- Flag Seal Logo
- Nicknames: Downtown Fairfax, Fairfax City, Historic Fairfax
- Interactive map of Fairfax, Virginia
- Location within Northern Virginia Location within Virginia Location within the United States
- Coordinates: 38°51′9″N 77°18′15″W
- Country: United States
- State: Virginia
- Pre-incorporation County: Fairfax County (none after incorporation – Independent city)
- Founded: 1869

Government
  - Type: Council–manager government
  - Mayor: Catherine S. Read (D)

Area
  - Total: 6.27 sq mi (16.25 km^{2})
  - Land: 6.24 sq mi (16.16 km^{2})
  - Water: 0.031 sq mi (0.08 km^{2})
- Elevation: 312 ft (95 m)

Population (2020)
  - Total: 24,146
  - Estimate (2025): 26,772 ▲
  - Density: 3,870/sq mi (1,494/km^{2})
- Time zone: UTC−5 (EST)
  - Summer (DST): UTC−4 (EDT)
- ZIP Codes: 22030–22033
- Area codes: 703, 571
- FIPS code: 51-26496
- GNIS feature ID: 1498476
- Website: fairfaxva.gov

Fairfax (/ˈfɛərfæks/ FAIR-faks) (Note: formally the City of Fairfax, and colloquially known as Fairfax City, Downtown Fairfax, Old Town Fairfax, Fairfax Courthouse, FFX, and Fairfax) is an independent city in Virginia and the county seat of Fairfax County, Virginia, United States. As of the 2020 census, the population was 24,146.

Fairfax is part of both the Washington metropolitan area and Northern Virginia regions. It is located 14 miles (23 km) west of Washington, D.C. Fairfax is served by Washington Metro's Orange Line.

== History ==
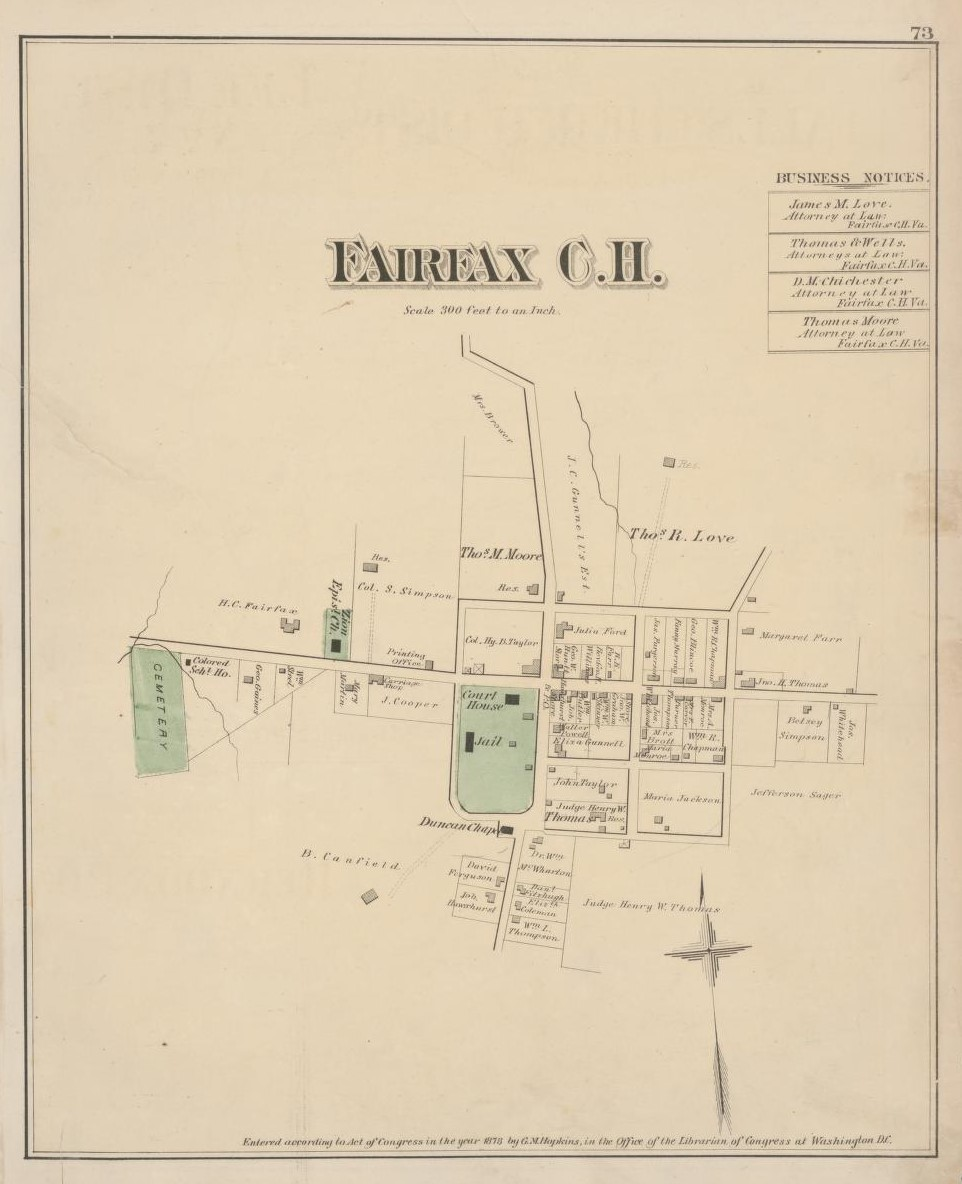
Map of Fairfax Courthouse, VA in 1878

Both the City and County of Fairfax take their names from Thomas Fairfax, 6th Lord Fairfax of Cameron, a Scottish nobleman and colonial landowner. In the 18th century, Lord Fairfax held the Northern Neck Proprietary, a vast land grant of more than five million acres between the Potomac and Rappahannock Rivers.

The area now known as the City of Fairfax began as the Town of Providence, a rural crossroads and the administrative seat of Fairfax County in the early 19th century. The town grew around the courthouse and developed as a local center for governance and commerce. In 1874, the town changed its name to Fairfax.

=== Early history ===
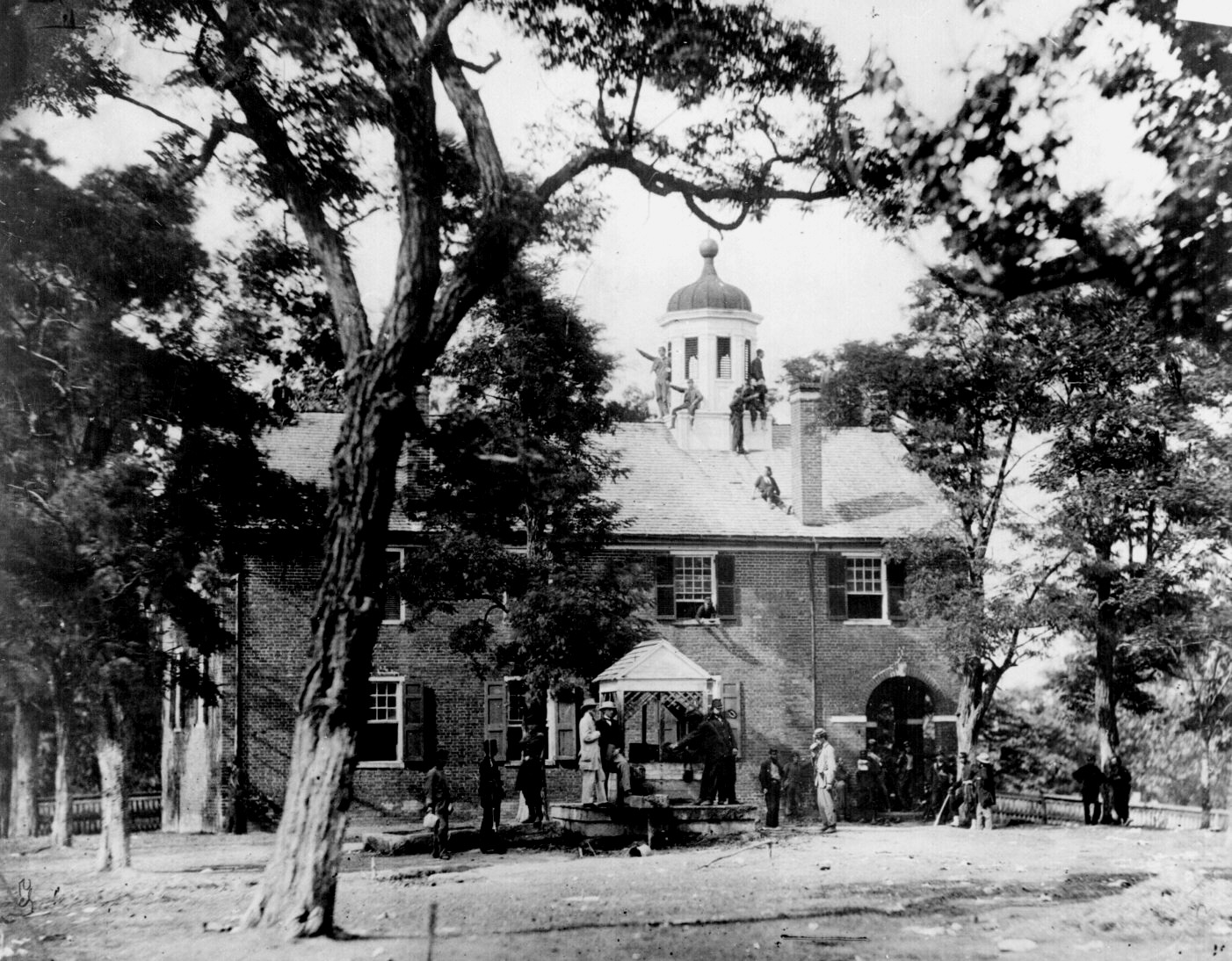
Union Army soldiers on the front lawn and roof of Fairfax Court House during the American Civil War in June 1863

Once inhabited by the Manahoac and Piscataway peoples, the area that the city now encompasses was settled in the early 18th century by farmers from Virginia's Tidewater Region. The town of "Providence" was established on the site by an act of the state legislature in 1805.

=== 19th century ===
On June 1, 1861, the first land battle of the Civil War, the Battle of Fairfax Court House, was fought in Fairfax after a Union army scouting party clashed with the local militia; the outcome was indecisive with neither side gaining advantage. A second battle took place in Fairfax two years later, on June 27, 1863, in which Union troops were defeated, which delayed the movements of Confederate cavalry chief Jeb Stuart with disastrous consequences for Robert E. Lee at the subsequent Battle of Gettysburg, the Civil War's bloodiest battle, which began several days later.

In 1859, Fairfax was renamed the "Town of Fairfax". It was incorporated as a town in 1874. It was incorporated as a city in 1961 by court order. Under Virginia law the city was separated from Fairfax County yet remains the county seat.

=== 20th century ===
In 1904, a trolley line connected Fairfax with Washington, D.C.

== Geography ==
Fairfax is located close to the geographic center of Fairfax County, at 38°51′9″N 77°18′15″W (38.852612, −77.304377). According to the U.S. Census Bureau, the city has a total area of 6.3 square miles (16.3 km^{2}), of which all but 0.04 square miles (0.1 km^{2}) is land.

While the city is the county seat, a small portion of the county comprising the courthouse complex, the jail, and a small area nearby is itself an exclave of the county within the city. Fairfax County's Government Center is west of Fairfax.

=== Water Courses ===
The City is home to the start of the Accotink Creek and the source of Daniels Run, which flows into Accotink Creek.

=== Climate ===
The City is in the humid subtropical climate under the Köppen climate classification characterized by long and hot summers and cool to mild winters.

== Demographics ==
Historical population
Census	Pop.	Note	%±
1880	376		—
1890	376		0.0%
1900	373		−0.8%
1910	413		10.7%
1920	516		24.9%
1930	640		24.0%
1940	979		53.0%
1950	1,946		98.8%
1960	13,585		598.1%
1970	21,970		61.7%
1980	19,390		−11.7%
1990	19,622		1.2%
2000	21,498		9.6%
2010	22,565		5.0%
2020	24,146		7.0%
2025 (est.)	26,772	▲	10.9%
U.S. Decennial Census; 1790–1960 1900–1990; 1990–2000 2010 2020

=== Racial and ethnic composition ===
Fairfax city, Virginia – Racial and ethnic composition Note: the US Census treats Hispanic/Latino as an ethnic category. This table excludes Latinos from the racial categories and assigns them to a separate category. Hispanics/Latinos may be of any race.
Race / Ethnicity (NH = Non-Hispanic)	Pop 1980	Pop 1990	Pop 2000	Pop 2010	Pop 2020	% 1980	% 1990	% 2000	% 2010	% 2020
White alone (NH)	17,799	16,100	14,333	13,849	12,911	91.79%	82.05%	66.67%	61.37%	53.47%
Black or African American alone (NH)	574	936	1,035	1,030	1,052	2.96%	4.77%	4.81%	4.56%	4.36%
Native American or Alaska Native alone (NH)	49	41	55	62	44	0.25%	0.21%	0.26%	0.27%	0.18%
Asian alone (NH)	479	1,372	2,609	3,403	4,519	2.47%	6.99%	12.14%	15.08%	18.72%
Native Hawaiian or Pacific Islander alone (NH)	x	x	14	11	9	x	x	0.07%	0.05%	0.04%
Other race alone (NH)	110	14	28	48	204	0.57%	0.07%	0.13%	0.21%	0.84%
Mixed race or Multiracial (NH)	x	x	492	606	1,129	x	x	2.29%	2.69%	4.68%
Hispanic or Latino (any race)	379	1,159	2,932	3,556	4,278	1.95%	5.91%	13.64%	15.76%	17.72%
Total	19,390	19,622	21,498	22,565	24,146	100.00%	100.00%	100.00%	100.00%	100.00%

=== 2020 census ===
As of the 2020 census, Fairfax had a population of 24,146. The median age was 39.0 years. 19.5% of residents were under the age of 18 and 16.0% of residents were 65 years of age or older. For every 100 females there were 98.6 males, and for every 100 females age 18 and over there were 96.4 males age 18 and over.

100.0% of residents lived in urban areas, while 0.0% lived in rural areas.

There were 8,800 households in Fairfax, of which 32.4% had children under the age of 18 living in them. Of all households, 53.5% were married-couple households, 17.4% were households with a male householder and no spouse or partner present, and 24.1% were households with a female householder and no spouse or partner present. About 21.6% of all households were made up of individuals and 8.9% had someone living alone who was 65 years of age or older.

There were 9,330 housing units, of which 5.7% were vacant. The homeowner vacancy rate was 0.7% and the rental vacancy rate was 5.2%.

Racial composition as of the 2020 census
Race	Number	Percent
White	13,473	55.8%
Black or African American	1,103	4.6%
American Indian and Alaska Native	145	0.6%
Asian	4,537	18.8%
Native Hawaiian and Other Pacific Islander	10	0.0%
Some other race	2,067	8.6%
Two or more races	2,811	11.6%
Hispanic or Latino (of any race)	4,278	17.7%

== Economy ==
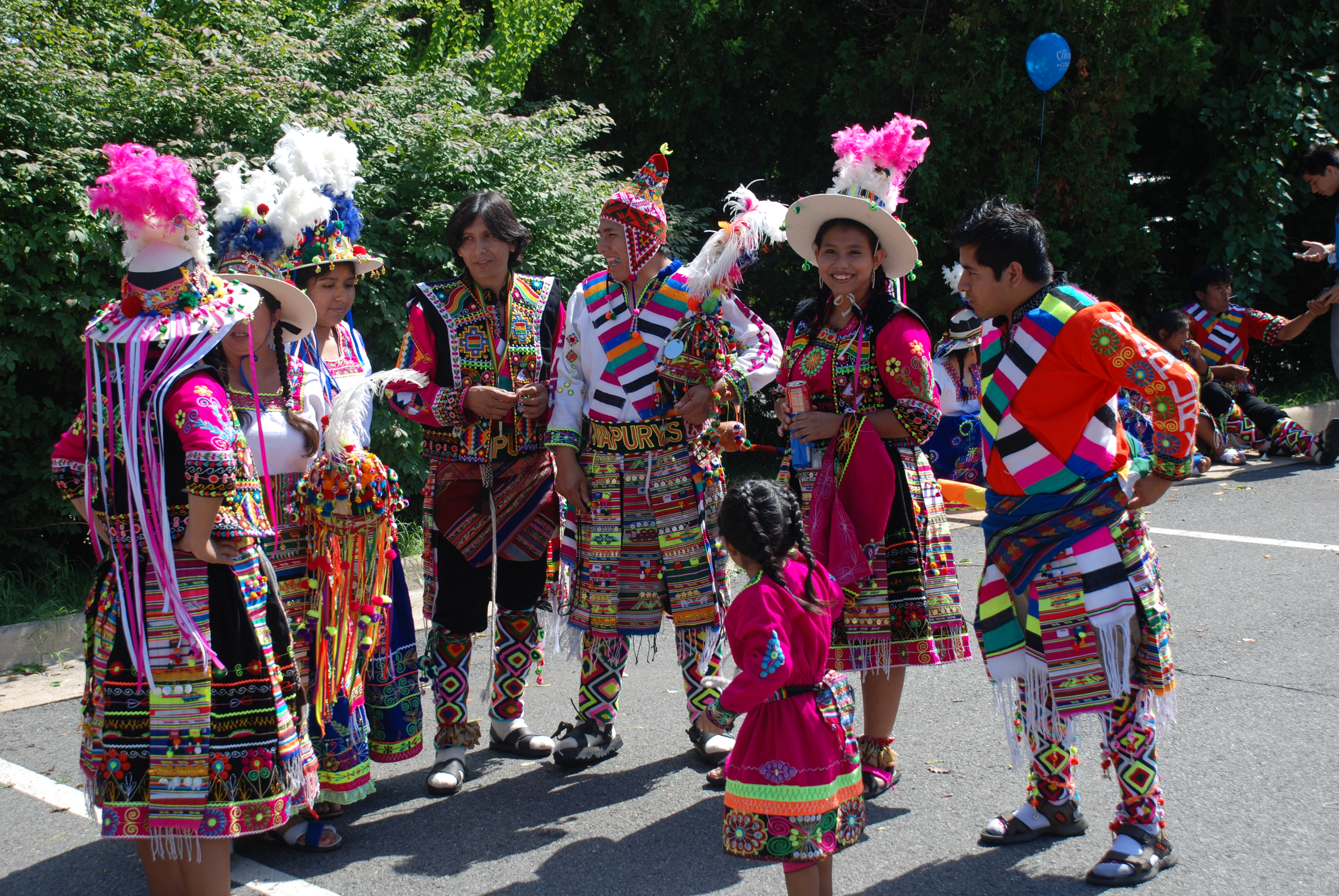
The 2014 July 4 parade's dance group Fraternidad Tinkus Wapury

Old Town Fairfax has undergone an extensive redevelopment, which began in 2005. The redevelopment added a new Fairfax Regional Library, more than 45,000 square feet (4,200 m^{2}) of retail and restaurant space, more than 70,000 square feet (6,500 m^{2}) of office condominiums, and 85 upscale residential condominium units.

In May 2009, Fairfax was rated as No. 3 in the "Top 25 Places to Live Well" by Forbes Magazine. Forbes commended Fairfax for its strong public school system, high median salary, and a rate of sole proprietors per capita that ranks it in the top 1 percent nationwide. According to the magazine, "These factors are increasingly important in a recession. When businesses and jobs retract, as they have nationwide, municipalities with strong environments for start-ups, and those that offer attractive amenities, are better suited to recover from economic downtimes, as there are more business activity filling the void."

=== Top employers ===
According to the city's 2025 Annual Comprehensive Financial Report, the top employers in the city are:

#	Employer	# of Employees
1	City of Fairfax	600
2	Sentry Force	250–499
3	Zeta Associates (Note: now a wholly owned subsidiary of Lockheed Martin)	250–499
4	Ted Britt Ford	250–499
5	Premium Home Health Care	100–249
6	Fairfax Operator	100–249
7	Community Systems	100–249
8	Trident Systems, Inc.	100–249
9	Home Depot	100–249
10	ASAP Firewatch	100–249
11	Farrish Of Fairfax	100–249
12	Ourisman Fairfax Toyota	100–249
13	Capital Home Care	100–249
14	Hands of Mercy	100–249
15	A Kind & Caring Home	100–249

== Arts and culture ==
=== Architecture ===
Piney Branch Mill, part of the Hope Park estate of Edward Payne in the 1800s

The former Fairfax County Courthouse is the oldest historic building in Fairfax. The first Fairfax courthouse was established in 1742 near present-day Tysons, and is the namesake for Old Courthouse Road. It intersects with Gallows Road, which today is a major commuter route, but at the time was the road where condemned prisoners were led to the gallows at the old courthouse.

In 1752, the courthouse was moved to Alexandria, which offered to build the new courthouse at their own expense. The reason the courthouse was moved from the Tysons Corner location was because of "Indian hostilities", which is noted on the stone marker at the northwest corner of Gallows Road and Route 123. The courthouse operated there until 1790, when Virginia ceded the land where the courthouse was located in preparation for the relocation of the national capital from Philadelphia to Washington, D.C. in 1800.

The General Assembly specified that the new courthouse should be located in the center of the county, and it was established at the corner of what was Old Little River Turnpike at present-day Main Street and Ox Road on Chain Bridge Road on land donated by town founder Richard Ratcliffe.

The courthouse changed hands repeatedly during the American Civil War. The first Confederate officer battle casualty, John Quincy Marr, occurred on the grounds of the courthouse. The first meeting of the Fairfax Court was held April 21, 1800. The oldest two-story building in Fairfax, the Fairfax Public School (Note: was Old Fairfax Elementary School Annex, now the Fairfax Visitor Center and Museum) was built in 1873 for $2,750. In addition to elementary school use, the building has also housed special education, adult education, and police academy training.

On July 4, 1992, the building became the Fairfax Museum and Visitor Center. Joseph Edward Willard built the town hall building in 1900, and then gifted it to the town in 1902.

The Old Town Hall now houses the Huddleston Library and the Fairfax Art League.

=== Sites on the National Register of Historic Places ===
Site	Built	Address	Listed
29 Diner (Note: Tastee 29 Diner)	1947	10536 Fairfax Boulevard	1992
Blenheim	1859	3610 Blenheim Blvd.	2001
City of Fairfax Historic District	1800	Junction of VA 236 and VA 123	1987
Old Fairfax County Courthouse (Note: Within the county exclave within the city.)	1800	4000 Chain Bridge Road	1974
Old Fairfax County Jail	1891	10475 Main Street	1981
Fairfax Public School	1873	10209 Main Street	1992
Ratcliffe-Allison House	1812	10386 Main Street	1973

=== Annual events ===
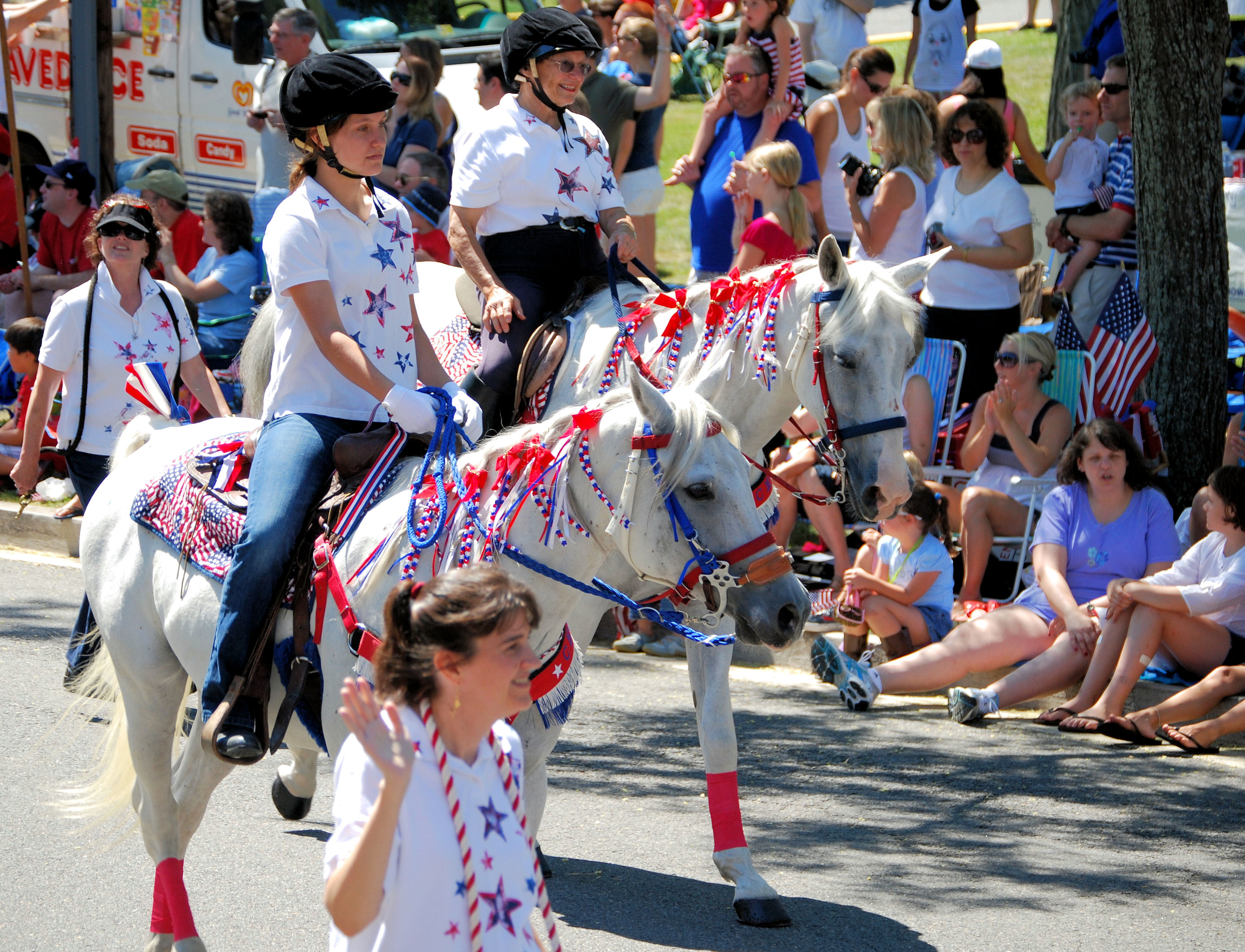
The 2010 4th of July parade, including the Clifton Horse Society

- Chocolate Lovers Festival

The annual Chocolate Lover's Festival is held in the heart of Old Town Fairfax during the first full weekend in February. Events have included craft shows, historic building open houses, children's activities, collections of vendors selling various edible chocolate products, and even chocolate sculpture contests.

- Fairfax Civil War Day

Every year, during the Spring, a Civil War re-enactment camp is held at the Blenheim estate, a city-owned historical property. The encampment features cultural information about Civil War-era people and practices, military muster, drill, and a firing demonstration.

- Fairfax Spotlight on the Arts

Each April, Fairfax, in cooperation with George Mason University, Northern Virginia Community College, and Fairfax schools, sponsors the Fairfax Spotlight on the Arts Festival. The festival runs for three weeks and features music, dance, theater, art and choral concerts. Events take place at venues throughout the city and the colleges.

- National Trails Day

In June, a National Trails Day is held to celebrate the trails, open spaces and parks in the Fairfax.

- Independence Day Celebration Parade and Evening Show

The largest hometown parade and fireworks celebration in the Washington metropolitan region is held in the Fairfax. The day's events include a parade through Old Town Fairfax, tours of historic buildings and local museums, an Old-Fashioned Fireman's Day at the Fire Station No. 3, and a live concert and fireworks display at Fairfax High School.

- Irish Festival

In September, a festival of Irish and Celtic song, dance and music is held in and around Old Town Fairfax.

- Fall for the Book Festival

Each fall, the Fall for the Book Festival features readings, discussions, lectures and exhibits from nationally recognized writers and professionals. Festival events are held in the Fairfax at George Mason University and throughout the Washington metropolitan area. Two community reading programs coordinate with Fall for the Book: "All Fairfax Reads," coordinated by the Fairfax County Public Library, and "Mason Reads" at George Mason University.

- Fall Festival

A Fall Festival is held in historic Old Town Fairfax on the second Saturday in October. This event includes more than 500 arts, crafts, and food vendors, and is usually held outdoors on the streets of the city. Attendance is about 35,000 to 45,000.

- The Holiday Craft Show

An annual Holiday Craft Show is held at Fairfax High School on the third Saturday and Sunday of November. The event features hundreds of craft vendors. Attendance is about 8,000 to 10,000.

- Festival of Lights & Carols

On the first Saturday in December, the city holds a Festival of Lights and Carols. Activities include photos with Santa, caroling, a yule log, hot mulled cider, illumination of Old Town Fairfax, and the lighting of the city Christmas tree.

=== Public libraries ===
Fairfax County Public Library operates the Fairfax Regional Library in Fairfax. The library includes the Virginia Room, a collection of books, photographs, and manuscripts related to Fairfax County history, government, and genealogy.

== Government ==
As an independent city of Virginia, rather than an incorporated town within a county, Fairfax derives its governing authority from the Virginia General Assembly. To revise the power and structure of the city government, the city must request the General Assembly to amend the charter. The present charter was granted in 1966. An exclave of Fairfax County is located within Fairfax.

United States presidential election results for Fairfax, Virginia
Year	Republican		Democratic		Third party(ies)	
Year	No.	%	No.	%	No.	%
1964	1,924	40.37%	2,835	59.48%	7	0.15%
1968	2,963	48.70%	2,153	35.39%	968	15.91%
1972	5,063	67.73%	2,274	30.42%	138	1.85%
1976	4,174	53.36%	3,464	44.28%	185	2.36%
1980	4,475	55.91%	2,614	32.66%	915	11.43%
1984	6,234	65.36%	3,263	34.21%	41	0.43%
1988	5,576	61.27%	3,430	37.69%	95	1.04%
1992	4,333	44.70%	3,884	40.07%	1,476	15.23%
1996	4,319	49.39%	3,909	44.70%	517	5.91%
2000	4,762	49.83%	4,361	45.64%	433	4.53%
2004	5,045	47.84%	5,395	51.16%	106	1.01%
2008	4,691	41.16%	6,575	57.69%	132	1.16%
2012	4,775	41.06%	6,651	57.19%	203	1.75%
2016	3,702	30.77%	7,367	61.24%	961	7.99%
2020	4,007	29.72%	9,174	68.04%	302	2.24%
2024	4,302	31.71%	8,797	64.84%	468	3.45%

=== Elected officials ===
In November on even-numbered years, city voters elect a Mayor, six at-large Councilmembers, and five at-large School Board members to serve two-year terms. These offices are non-partisan and at-large, and there are no term limits. City voters also elect the two city constitutional officers: Treasurer and Commissioner of the Revenue for four-year terms. Other elected officials who serve the city elected by city and Fairfax County voters include the Sheriff (four-year term), Commonwealth's Attorney (four-year term), and Clerk of the Court (eight-year term). State elected officials who represent Fairfax include the Virginia Governor, Lieutenant Governor, Attorney General, Virginia Senator (34th District), and Virginia Delegate (37th District). Starting with the 2023 election, the city will lie within the 37th Virginia Senate district and the 11th House of Delegates district. Federal elected officials who represent the Fairfax include the U.S. President, U.S. Vice President, two U.S. Senators (six-year terms), and one U.S. Representative, 11th District (two-year term).

=== Mayor arrested for distribution of methamphetamine ===
On August 4, 2016, then-Mayor Scott Silverthorne was arrested in a sting operation conducted by the Fairfax County Police Department. After receiving a tip that he was involved in drugs-related activities online, a police detective engaged Silverthorne on an online website "...used to arrange for casual sexual encounters between men." The detective then arranged a meeting with Silverthorne and two other men, in which they agreed to exchange methamphetamine. At the meeting in Tysons, detectives performed the exchange and then arrested Silverthorne along with the two other men. He was charged with felony distribution of methamphetamine and misdemeanor possession of drug paraphernalia. He announced his resignation on Monday, August 8, 2016, in a letter to the City Council.

Silverthorne maintains that he was not distributing methamphetamine for sex, and he was not tried for any sexual crimes.

=== Nonprofit Grants Program ===
In December 2024 the recipients of the City's new Nonprofit Grants Program were named. Announced in 2024 the City funded the grant program $300,000. Ongoing funding for the nonprofit grant program will be approved as part of the city's annual budget process. The City offers two grant options for human services nonprofits:

1. Standard Nonprofit Grant: This competitive program funds nonprofits seeking to develop, expand, or enhance services for city residents in the areas of prevention, crisis intervention, long-term support, and human services. Organizations may apply for a $10,001–$50,000 grant. For FY25, $275,000 is allocated.
2. Mini-Grant: The Mini-Grants program provides funding through a competitive process for eligible nonprofits focused on capacity building or small-scale projects. The application requires basic details about the organization's mission, project, budget, and two performance measures. Organizations may apply for a $5,000–$10,000 grant. For FY25, $25,000 is allocated.*

In November 2026 seven nonprofit organizations that provide critical support to Fairfax City residents will were named to receive a share of $200,000 in one-time grants from the City of Fairfax.

== Education ==

=== Primary and secondary schools ===
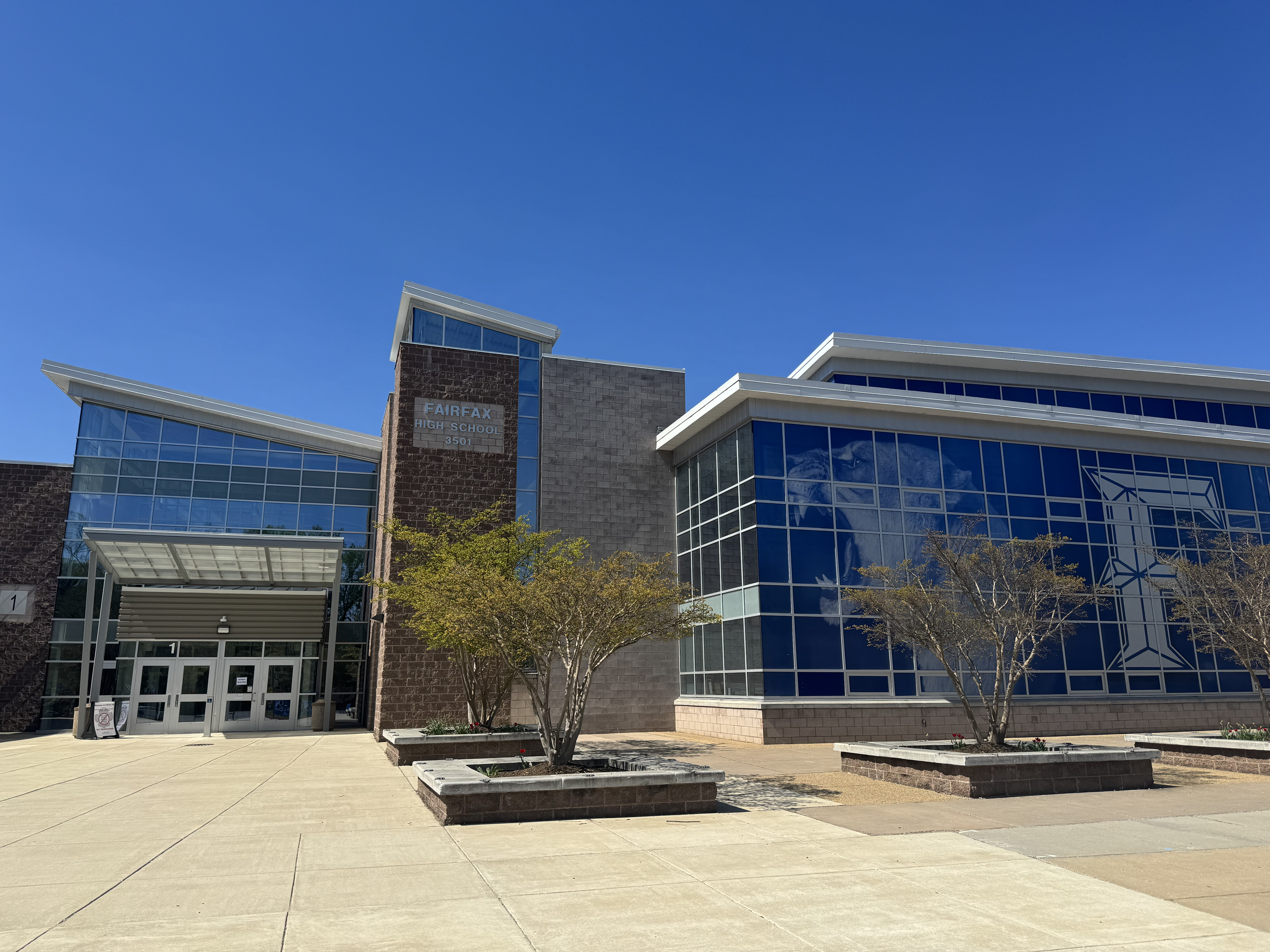
Fairfax High School

The school division for the city is Fairfax City Public Schools. The public schools in the City of Fairfax are owned by the city but administered by the Fairfax County Public Schools (FCPS) system under contractual agreement with Fairfax County. This arrangement began to be in place in 1961. Fairfax schools include Fairfax High School, Katherine Johnson Middle School, formerly Lanier Middle School, Daniels Run Elementary School, Providence Elementary School, and Fairfax Academy.

Schools within the city that are not owned by the city government include the Boyd School, (Note: Montessori School) Gesher Jewish Day School, Kellar School of Inova Kellar Center, (Note: Special Education School) Lee Highway KinderCare, (Note: Daycare / Preschool) Little Flock Christian School, Northern Virginia Christian Academy, Oak Valley Center, (Note: Special Education School) Paul VI Catholic High School (moved in 2020–2021), (Note: Roman Catholic) The Salvation Army's University View Child Care Center, (Note: Christian) Saint Leo The Great School, (Note: Roman Catholic) Trinity Christian School, and Truro Preschool and Kindergarten. (Note: Daycare / Preschool)

=== Colleges and universities ===
George Mason University, the largest university in Virginia, is located just south of Fairfax's city limits, with a small portion of the university grounds in the Fairfax city limits. The university enrolls 33,917 students, making it the largest university by head count in the Commonwealth of Virginia. The university was founded in 1949, and was initially an extension of the University of Virginia named the Northern Virginia University Center of the University of Virginia. Nine years after its founding, in 1958, the Town of Fairfax purchased 150 acres (0.61 km^{2}) for the university, though the property remained within the county when the town became a city. In 1972, following several name changes, the institution became George Mason University. The university is most known for its programs in economics, law, creative writing, computer science, and business. George Mason University faculty have twice won the Nobel Prize in Economics. George Mason University economics professors James M. Buchanan and Vernon L. Smith won it in 1986 and 2002, respectively.

== Infrastructure ==
=== Roads ===
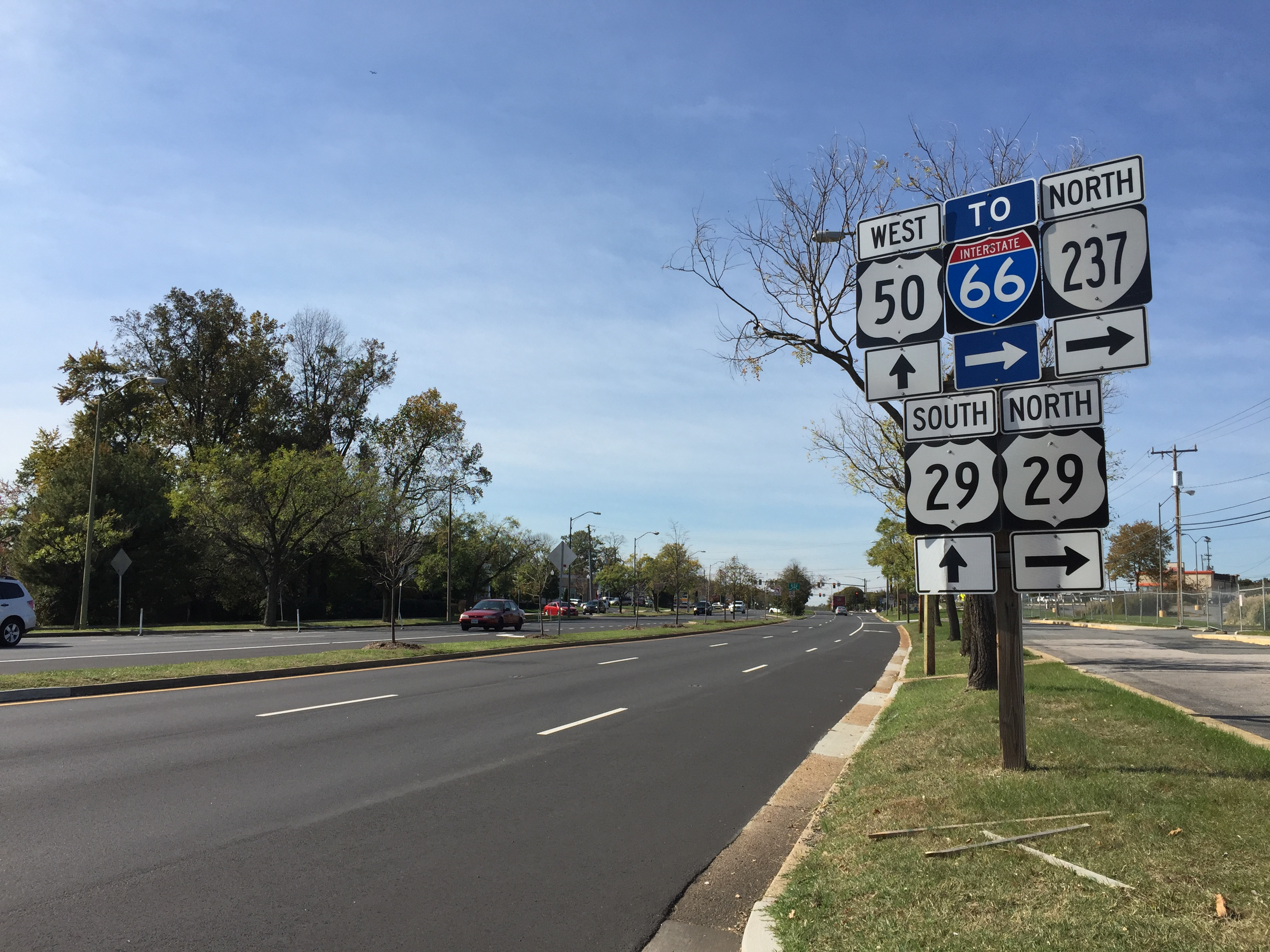
The junction of US 29, US 50, and VA State Rt. 237 in Fairfax

The intersection of U.S. Route 50 and U.S. Route 29 is located in the northeast corner of the city. The two major highways join to form Fairfax Boulevard for approximately 2.8 miles (4.5 km) through the city before separating. State Route 123, State Route 236 and State Route 237 pass through the city. SR 236 is named Main Street in the city and then becomes Little River Turnpike once the city line is crossed. Interstate 66 passes just outside the city limits and is the major highway serving the Fairfax region. Connections to I-66 from the city can be made via U.S. Route 50 and State Route 123.

In July 2026 work began on the long awaited Blenheim Blvd Multimodal Improvements. The work will redesigning Blenheim Boulevard between Layton Hall Drive and Ridge Avenue and is scheduled to be complete in July 2028.

=== Public transportation ===
==== Rail ====
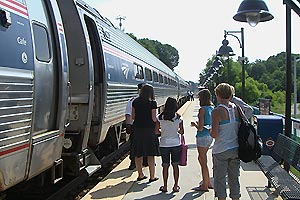
A Northeast Regional train operated by Amtrak at Burke Centre station in August 2010

Although these stations are located outside city limits, trips to and from Fairfax are served by:

- Vienna station of the Washington Metro
- Burke Centre station of Virginia Railway Express and Amtrak

==== Bus ====
- Fairfax operates the CUE Bus, an independent bus network.
- Multiple routes of the Washington Metrobus and the Fairfax Connector Route 306 and 610 serve Fairfax.

==== E-scooters and dock less mobility ====
- In February 2019, the city has launched a one-year pilot program for e-scooters and other dockless transportation. Three micro-mobility companies have been chosen to run the pilot, Bird company, Lime, and Spin.

== Notable people ==
- Neal Agarwal, programmer and game designer
- Robinson Aguirre, soccer player who represented the El Salvador national team
- Javier Alvial, soccer player
- Bobby, rapper, iKon
- TJ Bush, soccer player
- Antonio Bustamante, soccer player who represented the Bolivia national team
- David Castellanos, soccer player and coach
- Sam Champion, Good Morning America weather anchor and ABC News weather editor
- Serena Deeb, current AEW professional wrestler
- Bryce Eldridge, First baseman for the San Francisco Giants.
- Lewis J. Fields, U.S. Marine Corps lieutenant general
- Victor Gold, journalist and political consultant
- Christina Hendricks, actress and former model
- Willoughby Ions, composer and artist
- Joseph R. Jelinek, U.S. Army brigadier general and Army National Guard deputy director general
- Courtney Jines, actress
- Lamar Johnstone, silent film actor and director
- Brian Kendrick, WWE wrestler
- Sabrina Lloyd, actress, Sliders and Sports Night
- Ilia Malinin, U.S. Olympic figure skater
- Jay Matternes, paleoartist
- TobyMac, Christian singer and songwriter
- Joey Mercury, former WWE professional wrestler
- Meteos, League of Legends player for Cloud9 and Phoenix1
- Lorenzo Odone, subject of the 1992 film Lorenzo's Oil
- Jeremy Olander, Swedish DJ and electronic music producer
- Walter Tansill Oliver, former mayor of Fairfax, Virginia state delegate, and Virginia state senator
- Park Yu-hwan, actor and brother of Yoochun
- Prince Alexander of Yugoslavia
- Prince Philip of Yugoslavia
- Aldric Saucier, scientist and whistleblower
- Michael Schwimer, professional baseball player, Philadelphia Phillies
- Nathan Sonenshein, U.S. Navy rear admiral
- Frank Stephens, disability advocate, actor, and athlete
- Victoria Stiles, makeup artist
- Jason Sudeikis, actor, comedian, and Saturday Night Live cast member
- Pierre J. Thuot, Space Shuttle astronaut, Atlantis, Endeavour, and Columbia
- Matt Tifft, NASCAR race car driver
- Jarvis Varnado, former professional basketball player, Boston Celtics, Chicago Bulls, Miami Heat, and Philadelphia 76ers
- Park Yoo-chun, actor and pop band member, JYJ and TVXQ
- Charlotte Woodward, sociologist and disability rights advocate.
