= National Register of Historic Places listings in Shenandoah National Park =

This is a list of the National Register of Historic Places listings in Shenandoah National Park.

This is intended to be a complete list of the properties and districts on the National Register of Historic Places in Shenandoah National Park, Virginia, United States. The locations of National Register properties and districts for which the latitude and longitude coordinates are included below, may be seen in a Google map.

There are 13 properties and districts listed on the National Register in the park, two of which are National Historic Landmarks.

This National Park Service list is complete through NPS recent listings posted March 6, 2026.

== Current listings ==
| | Name on the Register | Image | Date listed | Location | City or town | Description |
|---|---|---|---|---|---|---|
| 1 | Archeological Site No. AU-154 | Archeological Site No. AU-154 | December 13, 1985 (#85003171) | Address Restricted | Luray | |
| 2 | Big Meadows Site | Big Meadows Site | December 13, 1985 (#85003172) | Address Restricted | Luray | |
| 3 | Big Run Quarry Site | | December 13, 1985 (#85003177) | Address Restricted | Luray | |
| 4 | Blackrock Springs Site | Blackrock Springs Site | December 13, 1985 (#85003169) | Address Restricted | Luray | |
| 5 | Camp Hoover | Camp Hoover | June 7, 1988 (#88001825) | Shenandoah National Park; 38°29′25″N 78°24′56″W | Graves Mill | |
| 6 | Cliff Kill Site | Cliff Kill Site | December 15, 1985 (#85003153) | Address Restricted | Luray | |
| 7 | Compton Gap Site | Compton Gap Site | December 13, 1985 (#85003176) | Address Restricted | Luray | |
| 8 | George T. Corbin Cabin | George T. Corbin Cabin | January 13, 1989 (#88003067) | 1.5 mi. off Skyline Dr. at jct. of Corbin Cabin Trail and Nicholson Hollow Trail; 38°36′07″N 78°20′42″W | Nethers | |
| 9 | Gentle Site | Gentle Site | December 13, 1985 (#85003174) | Address Restricted | Luray | |
| 10 | Jeremey's Run Site | Jeremey's Run Site | December 13, 1985 (#85003175) | Address Restricted | Luray | |
| 11 | Paine Run Rockshelter | Paine Run Rockshelter | December 13, 1985 (#85003170) | Address Restricted | Luray | |
| 12 | Robertson Mountain Site | Robertson Mountain Site | December 13, 1985 (#85003173) | Address Restricted | Sperryville | |
| 13 | Skyline Drive Historic District | Skyline Drive Historic District | April 28, 1997 (#97000375) | Shenandoah National Park, from the N entrance station at Front Royal to the S entrance station at Rockfish Gap; 38°32′54″N 78°27′38″W | Luray | Boundary increase (listed September 19, 1997): Within Shenandoah National Park, areas known as Headquarters, Big Meadows, Dickey Ridge, Simmons Gap, and Piney R; Boundary increase (listed December 5, 2003): Shenandoah National Park, Skyland, Lewis Mountain and Big Meadows; Designated National Historic Landmark October 6, 2008 |

== See also ==
- National Register of Historic Places listings in Augusta County, Virginia
- National Register of Historic Places listings in Madison County, Virginia
- National Register of Historic Places listings in Page County, Virginia
- National Register of Historic Places listings in Rockingham County, Virginia
- National Register of Historic Places listings in Warren County, Virginia
- List of National Historic Landmarks in Virginia
- National Register of Historic Places listings in Virginia
