= National Register of Historic Places listings in Madison County, Virginia =

Location of Madison County in Virginia

Madison County, Virginia, United States, has 22 properties and districts located on the National Register of Historic Places, including two National Historic Landmarks.

The locations of National Register properties and districts for which the latitude and longitude coordinates are included below may be seen in an online map.

This National Park Service list is complete through NPS recent listings posted September 4, 2026.

== Current listings ==
	Name on the Register	Image	Date listed	Location	City or town	Description
1	Belle Plaine	Belle Plaine	August 15, 2016 (#16000532)	2488 S. U.S. Route 15; 38°19′01″N 78°07′13″W	Locust Dale	
2	Big Meadows Site	Big Meadows Site	December 13, 1985 (#85003172)	Head of Hogcamp Branch at Big Meadows; 38°31′00″N 78°25′52″W	Luray	
3	Brampton	Brampton	December 12, 1985 (#85003350)	Brampton Rd. 38°17′55″N 78°06′43″W	Orange	
4	Camp Hoover	Camp Hoover	June 7, 1988 (#88001825)	Shenandoah National Park; 38°29′28″N 78°25′13″W	Graves Mill	
5	Cliff Kill Site	Cliff Kill Site	December 15, 1985 (#85003153)	Source of Hogcamp Branch at the edge of Big Meadows; 38°30′58″N 78°25′46″W	Luray	
6	Coates Barn	Coates Barn	August 12, 2020 (#100005442)	934 Champe Plain Rd. 38°32′25″N 78°16′01″W	Etlan	
7	George T. Corbin Cabin	George T. Corbin Cabin	January 13, 1989 (#88003067)	1.5 miles off Skyline Dr. at the junction of Corbin Cabin and Nicholson Hollow Trails; 38°36′07″N 78°20′41″W	Nethers	
8	Criglersville Elementary School	Criglersville Elementary School	April 3, 2025 (#100011627)	1120 Old Blue Ridge Turnpike; 38°27′38″N 78°18′13″W	Criglersville	
9	Gentle Site	Gentle Site	December 13, 1985 (#85003174)	Confluence of Hogcamp Branch and the Rose River below Big Meadows; 38°31′36″N 78°24′28″W	Luray	
10	Graves Mill	Graves Mill	August 30, 2006 (#06000754)	29 Graves Rd. 38°25′27″N 78°22′09″W	Wolftown	
11	Greenway	Greenway	November 16, 1988 (#88002385)	U.S. Route 15; 38°17′10″N 78°08′31″W	Madison Mills	
12	Hebron Lutheran Church	Hebron Lutheran Church	July 2, 1971 (#71000986)	1 mile northeast of Madison off U.S. Route 29; 38°24′27″N 78°14′50″W	Madison	
13	Hoffman Round Barn	Hoffman Round Barn	April 20, 2009 (#09000242)	4864 Wolftown-Hood Rd. 38°20′46″N 78°19′56″W	Wolftown	
14	The Homeplace	The Homeplace	August 5, 1999 (#99000959)	U.S. Route 29 at its junction with Hebron Valley Rd. 38°24′14″N 78°13′17″W	Madison	
15	James City Historic District	James City Historic District	July 13, 2001 (#01000691)	U.S. Route 29; 38°26′14″N 78°08′16″W	Madison	
16	Locust Hill	Locust Hill	May 30, 2002 (#02000590)	Junction of U.S. Route 15 with Oak Park and Locust Dale Rds. 38°20′09″N 78°07′36″W	Locust Dale	
17	Madison County Courthouse	Madison County Courthouse	November 12, 1969 (#69000258)	Old U.S. Route 29; 38°22′49″N 78°15′29″W	Madison	
18	Madison County Courthouse Historic District	Madison County Courthouse Historic District	August 16, 1984 (#84003549)	Main St. 38°22′39″N 78°15′36″W	Madison	
19	The Residence	The Residence	June 19, 1979 (#79003052)	Woodberry Forest School; 38°17′33″N 78°07′08″W	Woodberry Forest	
20	Robertson Mountain Site	Robertson Mountain Site	December 13, 1985 (#85003173)	Address Restricted	Sperryville	
21	Skyline Drive Historic District	Skyline Drive Historic District	April 28, 1997 (#97000375)	Shenandoah National Park, from the northern entrance station at Front Royal to the southern entrance station at Rockfish Gap; 38°32′36″N 78°23′36″W	Luray	
22	Woodbourne	Woodbourne	June 28, 1999 (#99000727)	Thrift Rd., 1.5 miles (2.4 km) west of its junction with U.S. Route 29 Alternate; 38°22′50″N 78°16′41″W	Madison	

== See also ==
- List of National Historic Landmarks in Virginia
- National Register of Historic Places listings in Virginia
