= Cliff Kill Site =

Archaeological site in Virginia, United States

- U.S. National Register of Historic Places
- Virginia Landmarks Register
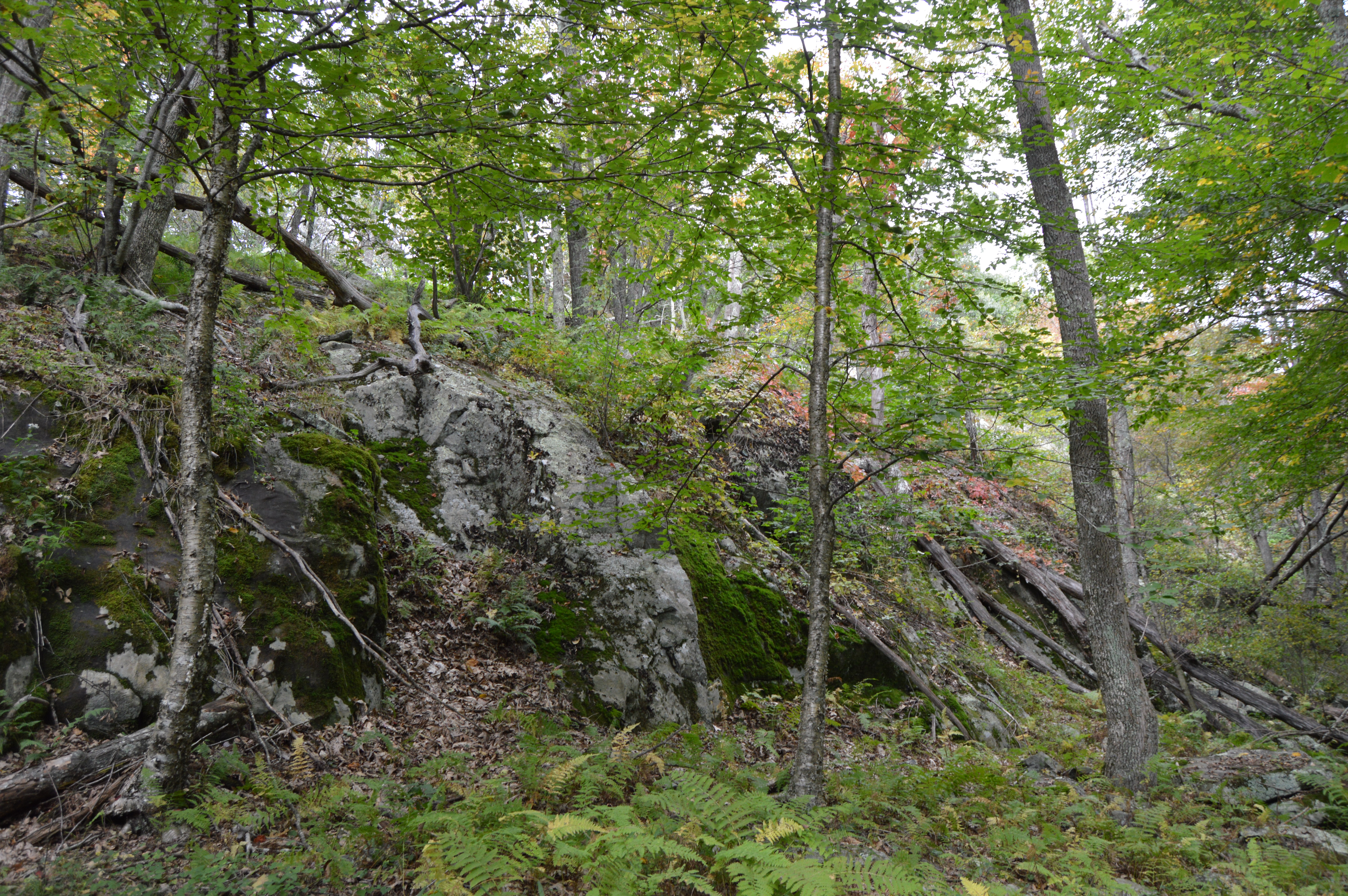
- Looking up from the bottom of the site

- Location within Virginia Location within the United States
- Location: Source of Hogcamp Branch at the edge of Big Meadows, near Luray, Virginia
- Coordinates: 38°30′58″N 78°25′46″W
- Area: 0.1 acres (0.040 ha)
- NRHP reference No.: 85003153
- VLR No.: 056-0059

Significant dates
- Added to NRHP: December 15, 1985
- Designated VLR: September 16, 1982

The Cliff Kill Site (44-MD-138) is an archaeological site in Shenandoah National Park, in Madison County, Virginia, United States. Its name derives from the discoverers' supposition that it was originally used as a buffalo jump.

The site was recorded during the early 1970s as part of a comprehensive survey of the national park. One of several sites in the Big Meadows complex, Cliff Kill lies at the meadow's eastern side, immediately east of a 10-meter cliff; boulders mark the northern edge, and the headwaters of a small stream form the boundaries to the east and south. The surveyors test excavated the site, discovering that Cliff Kill yielded the fewest artifacts of any site so investigated (seventy-one, versus hundreds or thousands at other sites), and almost half of these items were broken pieces of stone tools whose original purpose could not be identified. Quartzite was the dominant material, being used for more than three-quarters of artifacts. Some pieces of projectile points were identifiable as to their cultural affiliation, including three dating from the middle to late Archaic period and one Woodland point, thousands of years newer than the other three.

Given the paucity of artifacts, the appearance of flakes that had been reused for some purpose, and the total absence of evidence for on-site lithic reduction, the surveyors concluded that the site was periodically used as a specialty hunting camp, not as a base camp where daily tasks (such as repairing stone tools) would have been undertaken; if the site indeed were used as a buffalo jump, the animals would have been butchered at the cliff's base and the meat removed for consumption elsewhere. This supposition prompted the surveyors to choose the name "Cliff Kill" for the site.

In 1985, Cliff Kill was listed on the National Register of Historic Places because of its archaeological value.
