= Gentle Site =

Archaeological site in Virginia, United States

- U.S. National Register of Historic Places
- Virginia Landmarks Register
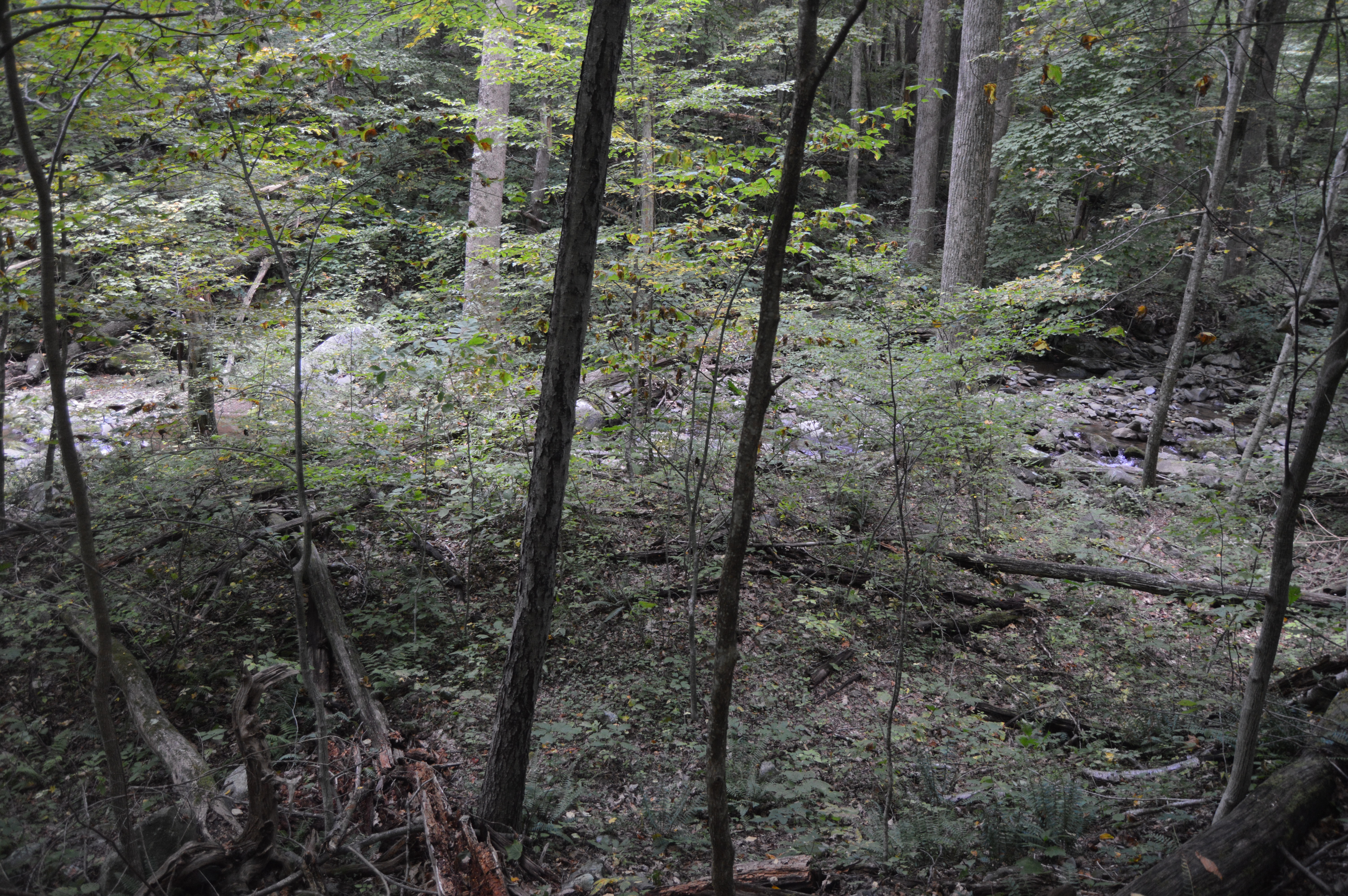
- Overview from above
- Location: Confluence of Hogcamp Branch and the Rose River below Big Meadows, near Luray, Virginia
- Coordinates: Address restricted
- Area: 0.3 acres (0.12 ha)
- NRHP reference No.: 85003174
- VLR No.: 056-0058

Significant dates
- Added to NRHP: December 13, 1985
- Designated VLR: September 16, 1982

The Gentle Site (44-MD-112) is an archaeological site in Shenandoah National Park, in Madison County, Virginia, United States.

Recorded during the early 1970s as part of a comprehensive survey of the national park, the Gentle Site is distinctive because of the lithic cores that it yielded, many of which were tiny articles of cryptocrystalline smaller than cores from any other site noted by the survey. Shallower than many of the other sites, just 10 centimetres (3.9 in) deep versus the 20 cm or deeper of other survey-recorded sites, it was nevertheless one of the survey's largest sites, yielding more than five thousand artifacts over a surface area of approximately 6,000 square metres (65,000 sq ft).

The site lies near the Big Meadows complex of sites at the headwaters of the Rose River, at the confluence of the juvenile river with a small tributary, Hogcamp Branch; its elevation is approximately 2,200 feet (670 m), but it sits just below the saddle of Fisher's Gap at an elevation of more than 3,000 feet (910 m). Its location along the river, near a set of pools and waterfalls, suggest that it might have been used for catching fish such as the brook trout. Previous surveys had recorded the site, due to the numerous artifacts exposed in the surrounding terrain. The 1970s survey recorded early and late dates from a collection of projectile points found beneath the footpath that traverses the site; most were of a form found in Woodland-period sites postdating AD 1300, while the site also yielded a smaller collection resembling points from Early Archaic sites predating 4500 BC. A small collection of pottery, approximately 25 sherds, also was discovered; most of the pieces were of a form known as the Albemarle series. Overall, the stone artifacts found at Gentle were predominately quartzite, with cryptocrystalline and quartz representing most of the remainder. Most of these artifacts were tiny lithic flakes, many so small that they presumably could have been created only by the resharpening of existing blades made elsewhere, although the site also yielded two scrapers, a chopper that had been used as a basic millstone, and a hand drill.

The period between occupations, with thousands of years separating the earlier Archaic occupiers and the later Woodland tribesmen, is typical of major Virginia sites discovered in the 1970s, at which time there was a significant gap in the knowledge of the ancient hillmen living within the future state's borders. The presence of cryptocrystalline found in the Shenandoah Valley but not in the immediate vicinity of the site, together with numerous projectile points, prompted the surveyors to interpret it as a base camp for hunting and gathering in the mountains; apparently by Valley villagers who would have visited it during the summer and autumn.

In 1985, Gentle was listed on the National Register of Historic Places because of its archaeological value.
