= Locust Dale, Virginia =

Unincorporated community in Virginia, United States

Coordinates: 38°20′10″N 78°07′37″W

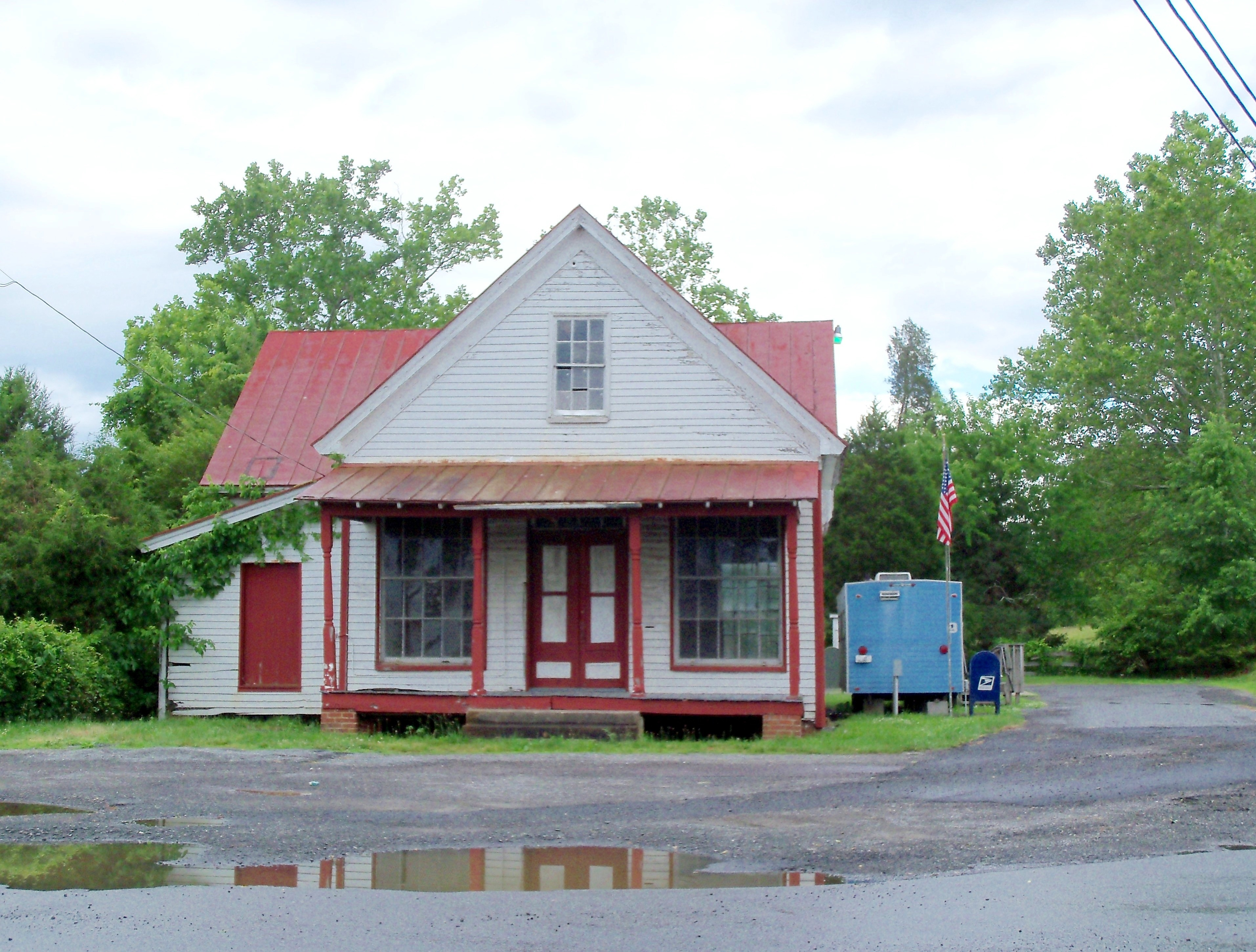
Post office in Locust Dale

Locust Dale is an unincorporated community in Madison County, Virginia, United States.

Locust Hill was listed on the National Register of Historic Places in 2002.
