= Old Rag Mountain =

Mountain in Virginia, US

- Old Rag Mountain, seen from Skyline Drive

Highest point
- Elevation: 3,284 ft (1,001 m)
- Prominence: 1,355 ft (413 m)
- Coordinates: 38°33′06.6″N 78°18′52.3″W

Geography
- Location: Madison County, Virginia, U.S.
- Parent range: Blue Ridge Mountains
- Topo map: USGS Old Rag Mountain

Geology
- Rock age: Precambrian
- Mountain type: Granite

Climbing
- Easiest route: Hike

Old Rag Mountain is a 3,284-foot (1,001 m) mountain near Sperryville in Madison County, Virginia. A part of the Blue Ridge Mountains, the peak is located within Shenandoah National Park and is the most popular hiking destination within the park.

In contrast to most mountains of the Blue Ridge, Old Rag has an exposed (rocky) summit.

== Geology ==
Old Rag Mountain is underlain by Old Rag Granite, named for its ubiquitous exposure on the mountain, formed during the Grenville Orogeny about a billion years ago. About 400 million years after the Grenville orogeny during the Catoctin Formation, deposition of basaltic magma occurred during the formation of the Iapetus Ocean, forming a layer of greenstone over the granite. This was followed by the Weverton Formation, Harpers Formation, and Antietam formation in which sand and rock sedimented on the ocean floor forming quartzite and sandstone deposits. Finally a period of sedimentation of shells and skeletons of foraminifera resulted in deposition of a layer of limestone. Approximately 700 million years after the Grenville Orogeny, the Iapetus Ocean began to close resulting in the Alleghenian Orogeny when the Old Rag Granite and layers of rock deposited upon it were transported westward and eventually thrust up over the limestone bed around it, forming Old Rag and the Blue Ridge Mountains.

== Recreation ==
View from the summit of Old Rag Mountain

=== Hiking ===
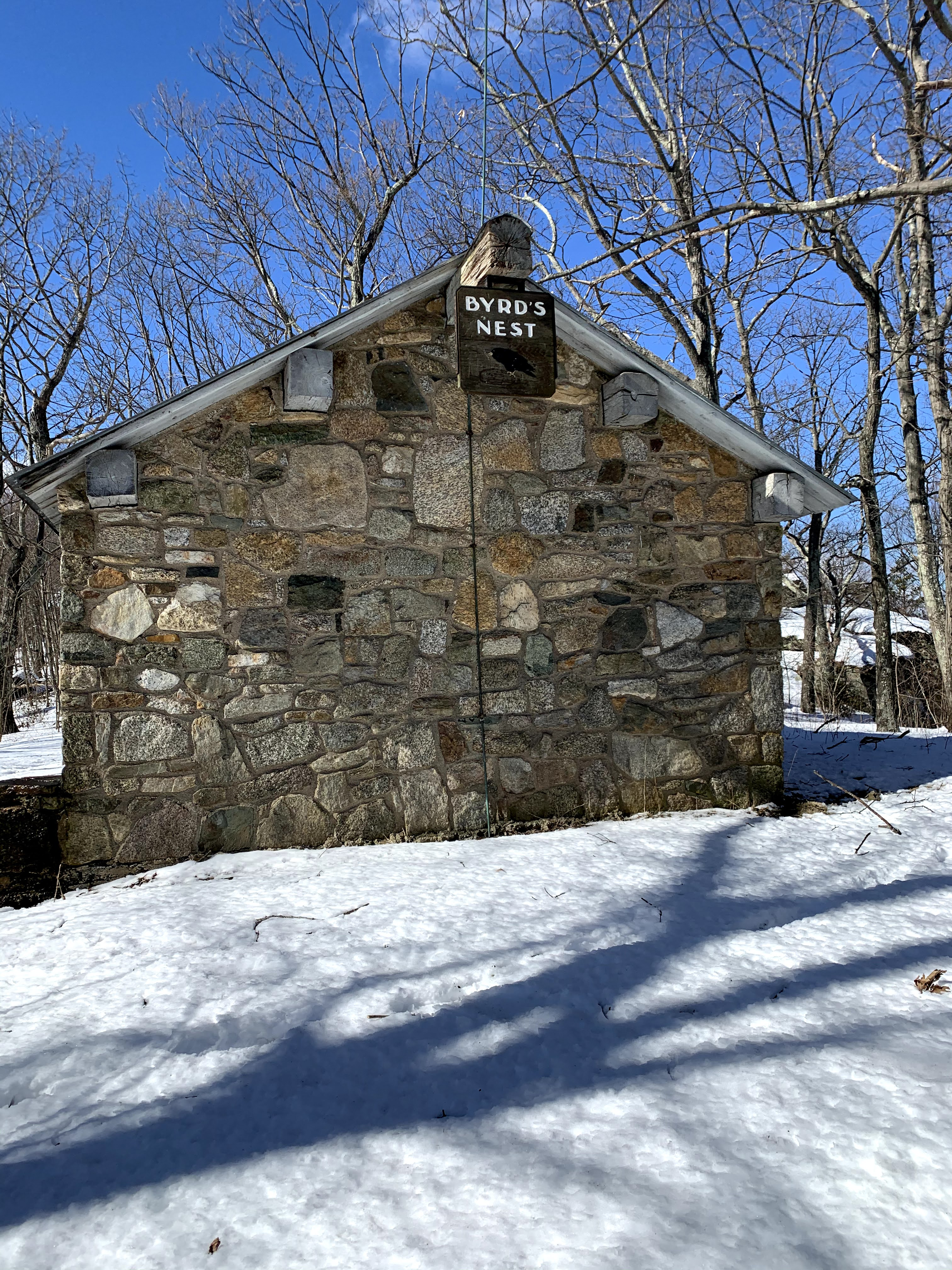
Byrd's Nest Shelter en route to Old Rag Summit

The summit of Old Rag is accessible via a system of trails in Shenandoah National Park. The shorter, most common way is from a parking area in Nethers near the end of Madison County's SR 601, off Virginia State Route 231, at the base of the mountain. A 9-mile (14.5 km) circuit hike or a 5.4-mile (8.7 km) out-and-back hike to the summit can be made. The circuit hike makes use of the Ridge Trail which ascends the mountain 1.6 miles (2.6 km) to the first false summit. The trail then turns into a rock scramble, which can be strenuous for inexperienced hikers, for 1.1 miles (1.8 km) to the summit and intersection with the Saddle Trail which descends 1.9 miles (3.1 km) down the saddle of the ridge past Byrds Nest #1 shelter and Old Rag shelter to the junction with Weakley Hollow Fire Road. The Fire Road then descends 2.5 miles (4.0 km) to the Old Rag parking area.

The summit can also be reached from Skyline Drive by following Old Rag Fire Road from the drive at milepost 43 to its eastern terminus with the Saddle Trail and then follow that trail to the summit.

The upper Old Rag parking area was closed to public vehicles in 2010. Parking was limited to the lower field parking area, adding a 0.9-mile (1.4 km) walk on asphalt.

In 2019, the National Park Service announced the construction of two new parking lots, forming a new trailhead. With this addition, the previous primary field lot is only used for overflow parking.

In 2022, the National Park Service announced the requirement of day-use tickets for each hiker between March 1 and November 30. The goal is to reduce impact on natural resources and overcrowding on the trails. The day-use ticket is in addition to the Shenandoah National Park pass fee.

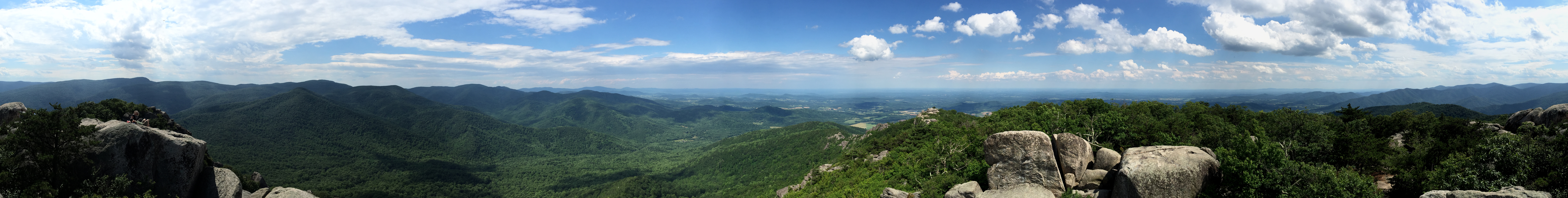
360-degree panorama from the summit of Old Rag Mountain

=== Rock climbing ===
Old Rag is a unique destination for rock climbing in the mid-Atlantic region. Its large granite exposures offer rock climbers an experience similar to that provided by the granite rocks of the Sierra Nevada, Yosemite, North Carolina, and New Hampshire. It boasts splitter cracks, dihedrals, and crystal pinching slabs.

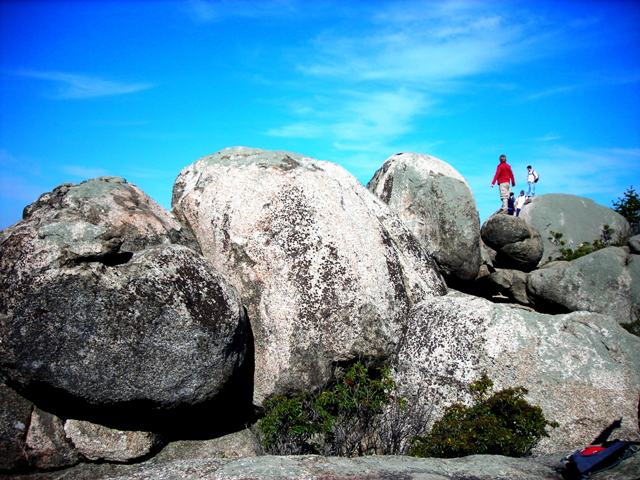
Rock scramble near the summit of Old Rag Mountain

The climbs are between 50 and 100 feet (15 and 30 m) in length, and range in difficulty from beginner to expert (5.4- to 5.12+ on the Yosemite Decimal System).

=== Bouldering ===
Old Rag has a rather underdeveloped bouldering section. However, because Old Rag has an exposed surface, bouldering challenges exist all along the trail.
