= Compton Gap Site =

Archaeological site in Virginia, United States

- U.S. National Register of Historic Places
- Virginia Landmarks Register
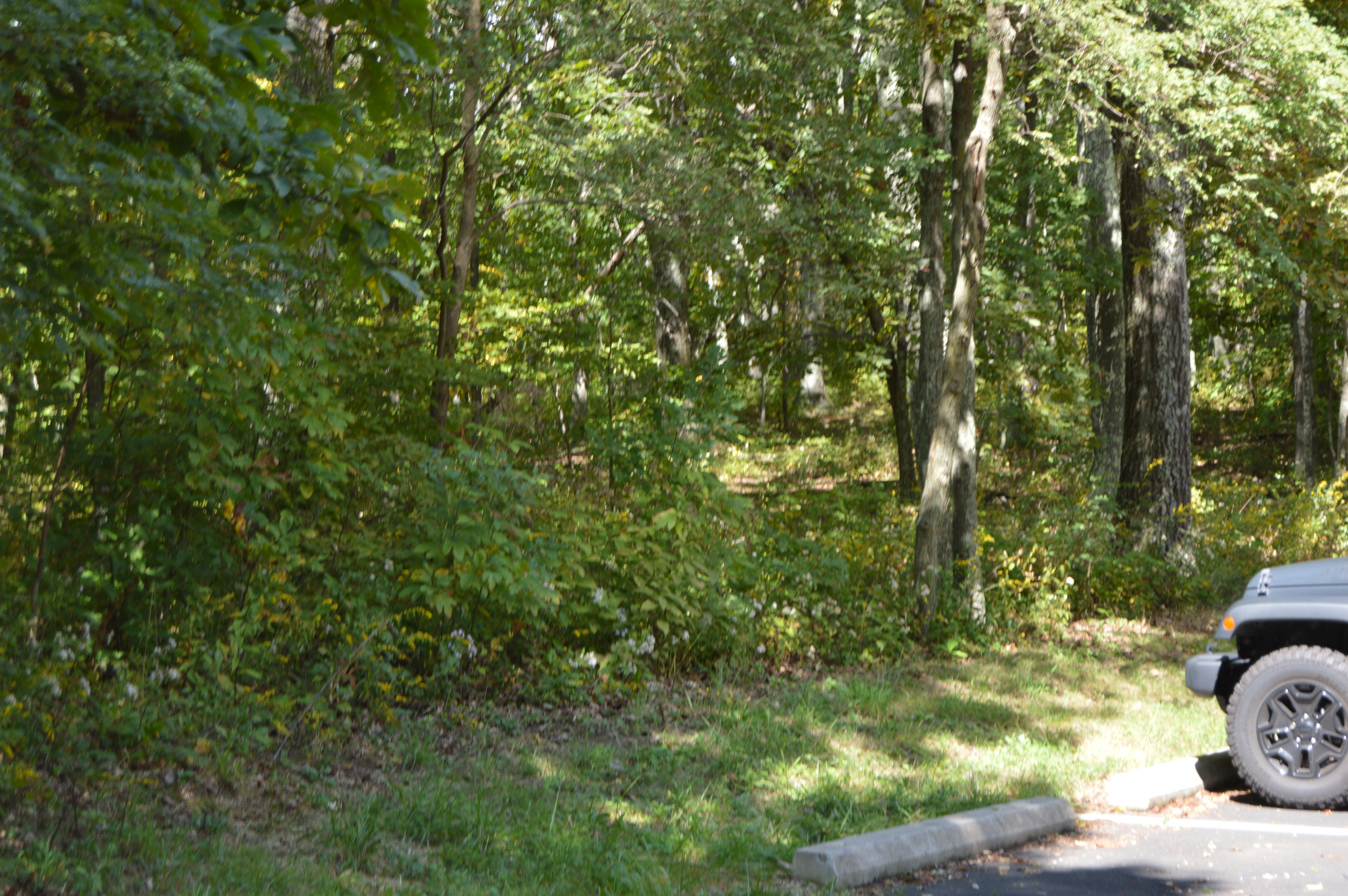
- Land at the archaeological site
- Nearest city: Luray, Virginia
- Area: 0.3 acres (0.12 ha)
- NRHP reference No.: 85003176
- VLR No.: 093-0168

Significant dates
- Added to NRHP: December 13, 1985
- Designated VLR: September 16, 1982

The Compton Gap Site is an archaeological site on the National Register of Historic Places near Luray, Virginia. It is located in Shenandoah National Park.
