= Rapidan Camp =

Historic house in Virginia, United States

- Camp Hoover
- U.S. National Register of Historic Places
- U.S. National Historic Landmark District
- Virginia Landmarks Register
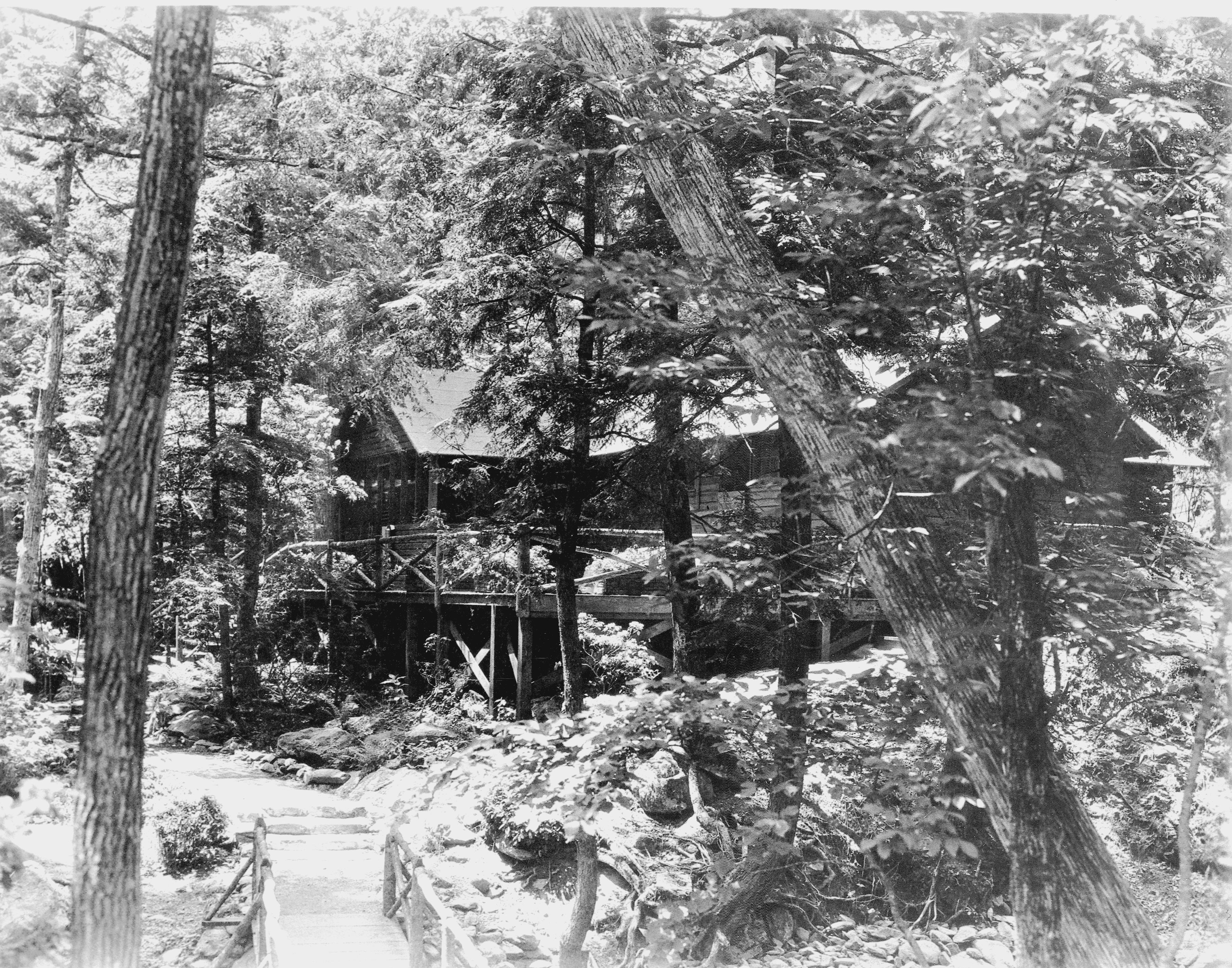
- The Rapidan Camp "Brown House" in Hoover's Time

- Location within Virginia Location within the United States
- Nearest city: Syria, Virginia
- Coordinates: 38°29′26.7″N 78°25′11.7″W
- Built: 1929
- Architects: Lou Henry Hoover, US Marine Corps
- NRHP reference No.: 88001825
- VLR No.: 056-0062

Significant dates
- Added to NRHP: June 7, 1988
- Designated NHLD: June 7, 1988
- Designated VLR: February 16, 1988

Rapidan Camp (also known at times as Camp Hoover) in Shenandoah National Park in Madison County, Virginia, was built by U.S. President Herbert Hoover and his wife Lou Henry Hoover, and served as their rustic retreat throughout Hoover's administration from 1929 to 1933. The first family's residential cabin was known as the "Brown House" in contrast to their more famous residence, the White House.

Rapidan Camp was precursor of the current presidential retreat, Camp David.

== 1929: Founding ==
In November 1928, Herbert Hoover was overwhelmingly elected as 31st president of the United States. While all preceding presidents came from the eastern half of the United States, Hoover's origins were further from Washington, D.C.—he had been born in Iowa and spent much of his life in California. Returning home to routinely escape the pressure and spotlight of the presidency would not be possible, so he desired a closer casual retreat.

Hoover and his wife had lived together at mining camps while he served as a mine engineer for over 10 years and appreciated the isolation of remote accommodations. He instructed his secretary Lawrence Richey to find a secluded retreat site within 100 miles (160 km) of Washington, D.C., at least 2,500 feet (760 m) above sea level to avoid mosquitoes and—most importantly—close to an excellent trout stream for fishing.

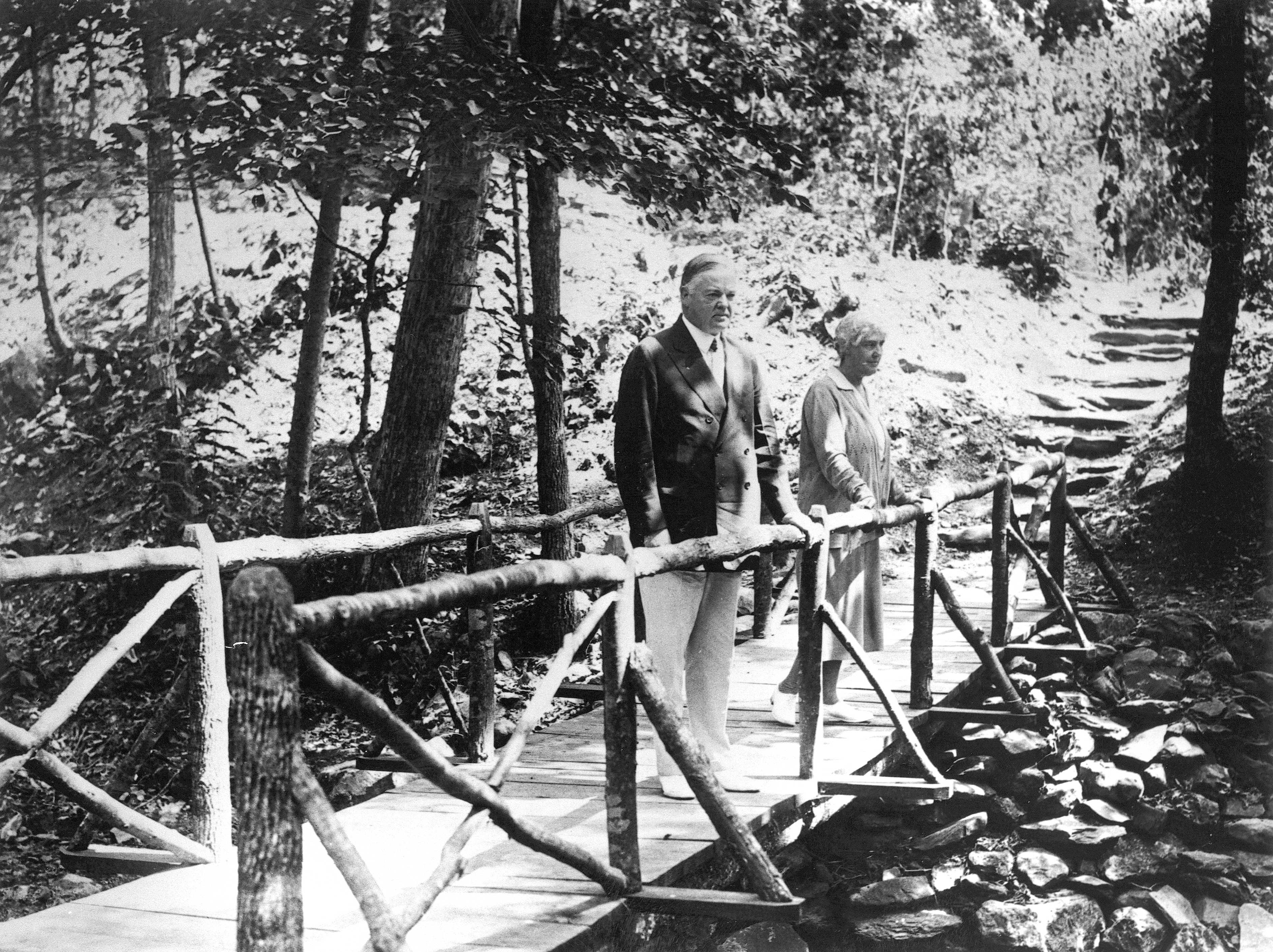
Herbert and Lou Henry Hoover on a footbridge at camp

Virginia Governor Harry F. Byrd was a strong supporter of plans to establish Shenandoah National Park, and persuaded Will Carson, Chairman of Virginia's Commission on Conservation and Development, to lead the effort. Two months before Hoover's March inauguration, Carson recommended that the President-elect and his wife Lou Henry Hoover consider establishing their camp at the headwaters of the Rapidan River. The remote, undeveloped site lay on Doubletop Mountain, on the eastern slope of the Blue Ridge Mountains in Madison County. The Mill Prong and the Laurel Prong streams join within the camp to form the Rapidan River, and all three provide excellent fishing.

Less than three weeks after Hoover's March 4 inauguration, the Madison Eagle announced the President and his wife had selected the upper Rapidan site. Although Virginians offered to give Hoover the camp, the President used his own funds to buy the land for $1,045 (at the going rate of $5 per acre), and building materials for $22,719. The Marine Corps provided construction labor as a "military exercise." The Hoovers initially envisioned a village of tents, but soon decided on a more permanent settlement. Mrs. Hoover oversaw construction as the Marines built thirteen assorted buildings including a lodge, two mess halls, cabins and a "Town Hall." They also created several miles of hiking trails, a stone fountain, concrete-lined trout pools, and a miniature golf course.

With one exception, this was the most difficult task in my career as an engineer, covering about 25 years. ... It would have been easier to have moved an army of 10,000 men across the Blue Ridge than to have built this camp. I have been amazed to find so wild an area existing here so close to eastern cities.

— USMC Major Earl Long, Marine Commander at Rapidan, June 1929

To reduce the presidential budget, Hoover decommissioned the Presidential Yacht Mayflower shortly after taking office. The Filipino mess crew from the Mayflower were transferred to Rapidan Camp, along with the kitchen supplies and china.

== 1929–1933: Presidential Retreat ==
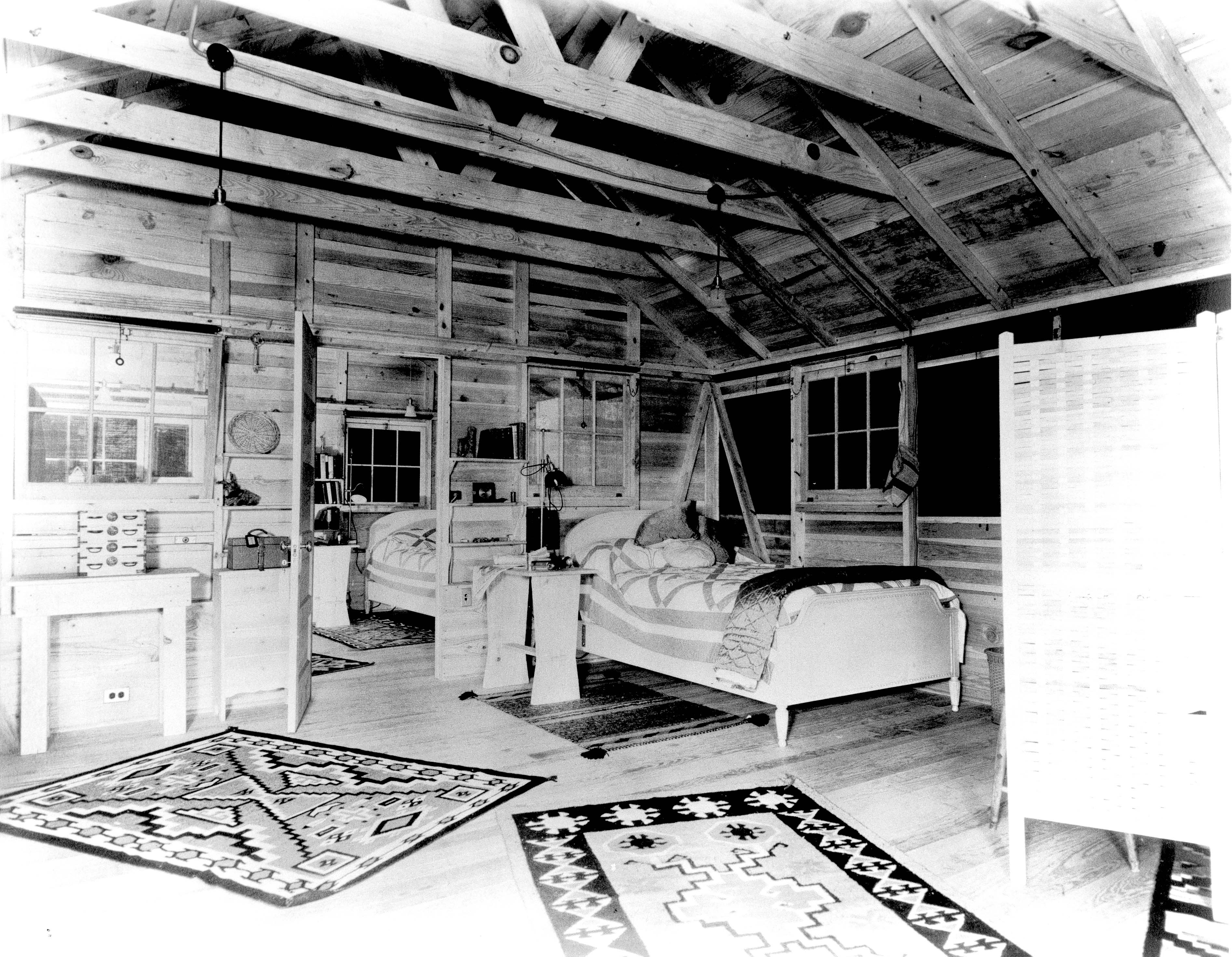
The First Lady's bedroom

At the 164 acre (66 hectare) Rapidan Camp, President Hoover enjoyed fishing in the streams, which were stocked with trout by the Interior Department. While Mrs. Hoover enjoyed riding horses at camp, Mr. Hoover did not enjoy riding horses simply to reach the camp. The state of Virginia added a one-mile extension from Rapidan Camp to a nearby road they had already planned. The road remains unpaved to this day, and occasionally challenged the presidential motorcade. The New York Times described camp as "frontier-like". Mrs. Hoover described the drive and camp:

This camp,—at the end of nowhere, with a road that in wet weather lets you sink to your hubs in slushy mush and while there bump over the most amazing boulders ... —has electric lights and a telephone and its morning papers. The mail is dropped from an airplane!

— Mrs. Lou Henry Hoover

In a public speech at the celebration of "Hoover Day" in the county seat of Madison, on August 17, 1929, President Hoover spoke of fishing and his camp:

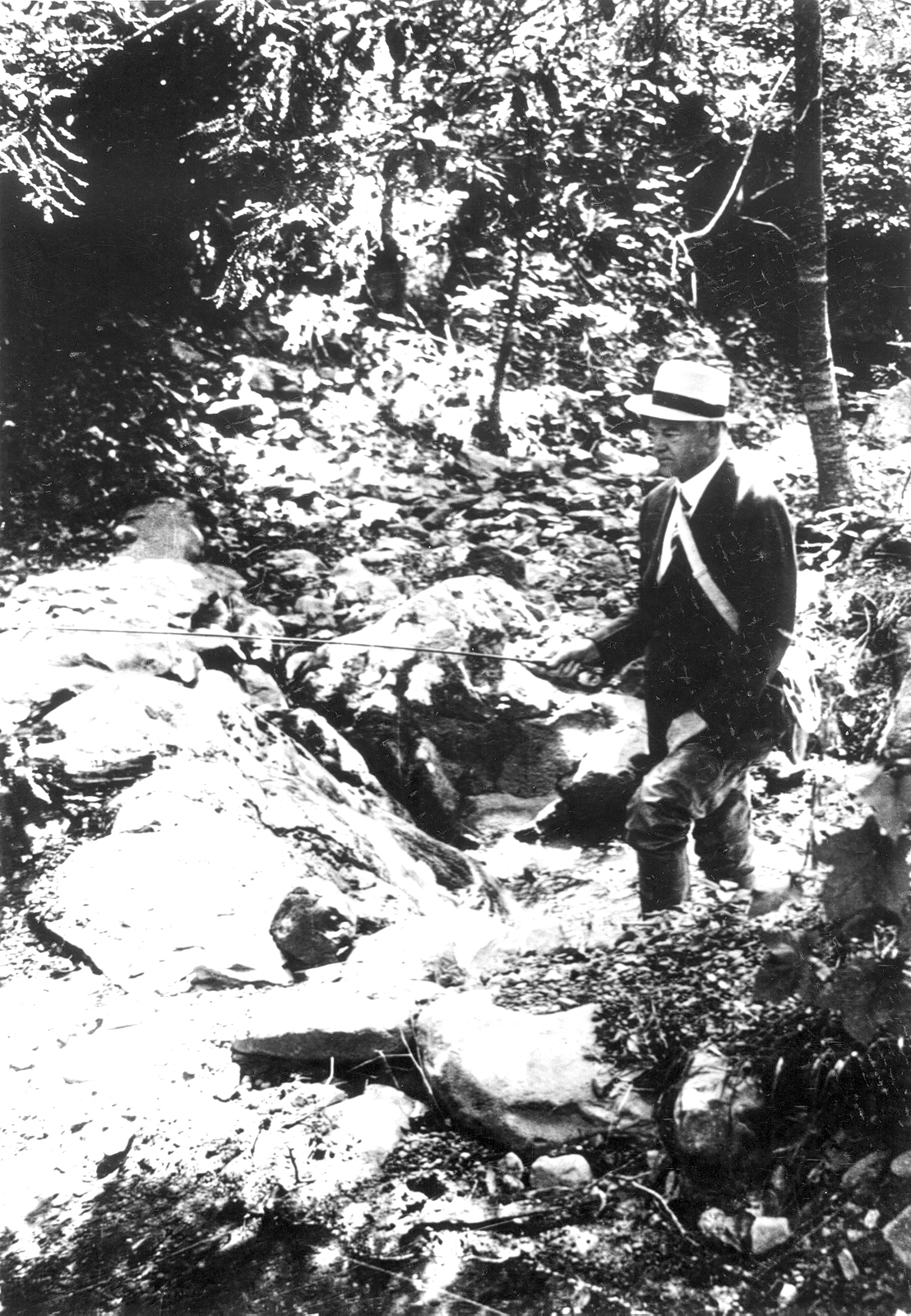
President Hoover fly fishing at Rapidan Camp

I fear that the summer camp we have established on the Rapidan has the reputation of being devoted solely to fishing. That is not the case, for the fishing season lasts but a short time in the spring. It is a place for weekend rest—but fishing is an excuse and a valid reason of the widest range of usefulness for temporary retreat from our busy world.

In this case it is the excuse for return to the woods and streams with their retouch of the simpler life of the frontier from which every American springs. ... Fishing seems to be the sole avenue left to Presidents through which they may escape to their own thoughts and may live in their own imaginings and find relief from the pneumatic hammer of constant personal contacts, and refreshment of mind in the babble of rippling brooks.

Moreover, it is a constant reminder of the democracy of life, of humility, and of human frailty—for all men are equal before fishes. And it is desirable that the President of the United States should be periodically reminded of this fundamental fact—that the forces of nature discriminate for no man.

— Herbert Hoover

Fishing was conducted only outside the camp grounds, and the fish within camp were "so tame that if you threw a pebble in the water they will rush out at it, or perhaps drift slowly into the open to look you over."

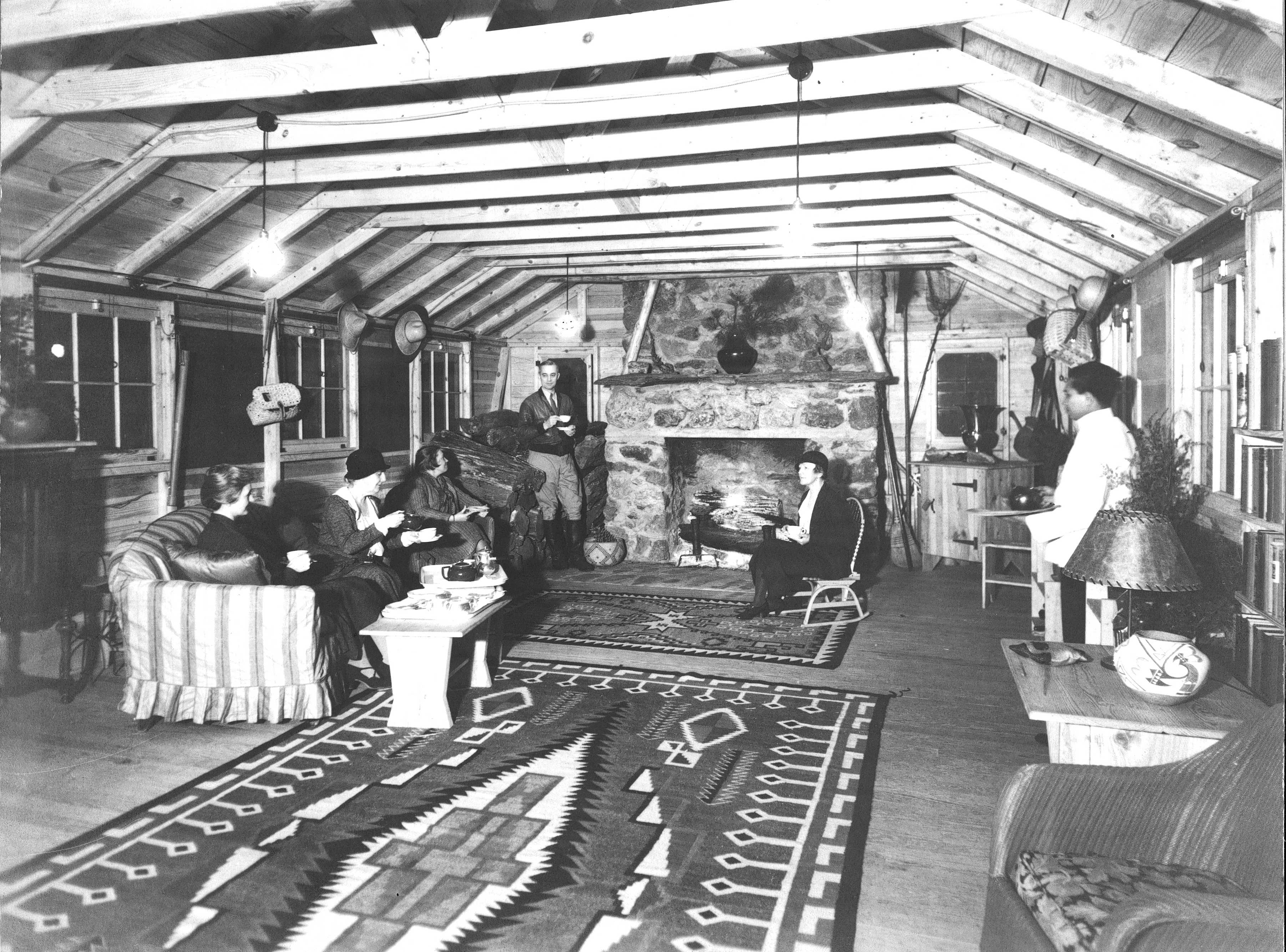
Guests at Rapidan Camp

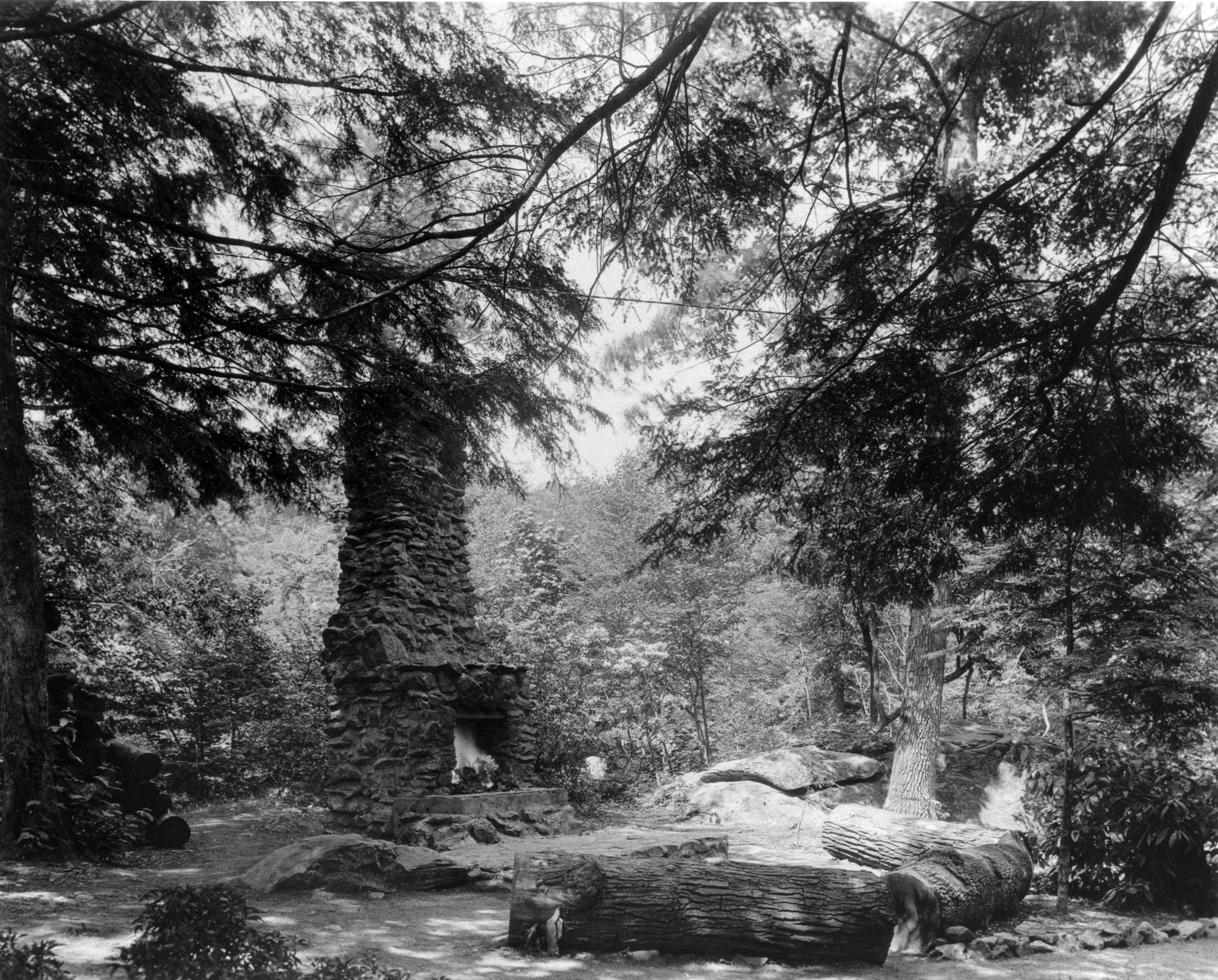
The outdoor fireplace

U.S. and foreign leaders came to the isolated and secure location of Rapidan Camp for strategy sessions with the President. His distinguished guests included inventor Thomas A. Edison and his wife, aviator Charles Lindbergh and his wife Anne Morrow Lindbergh, Supreme Court Justice Harlan F. Stone, Governor Theodore Roosevelt Jr., psychologist Lillian Moller Gilbreth, businessman Edsel Ford, and British Prime Minister Ramsay MacDonald and Chancellor of the Exchequer Winston Churchill. The President and guests would head immediately for the fishing ponds after arriving at camp.

The press were rarely, if ever, invited to Rapidan Camp with the President, until his final year in office when he campaigned for a second term and "invited a massed attack by film men who were given the run of the camp."

However, the President was not without friends in the press, and at least one of those, "Ding" Darling, the accomplished cartoonist for The Des Moines Register and with whom Mr. Hoover shared an interest in conservation of natural resources, was a guest at the Camp on several occasions. On one of those visits, Ding and the President were on horseback and took advantage of briefly escaping the eyes of the Secret Service, taking a side trail to a deserted Forest Service observation tower. They dammed the creek beside the tower, caught and cooked lunch, and then watched the Secret Service comb the hills in search of them.

Hoover's trips to camp were sometimes leisurely enough that he stopped for a roadside picnic. "Motorists paused along the highway, gaped at their President having fun." At other times, his departure from camp to Washington was so sudden that sandwiches were dispatched from the camp kitchen to the President for consumption en route, and Hoover was "intensely annoyed" when the press reported that his motorcade had sped at 60 miles per hour (97 km/h), in violation of Virginia's speed limit of 45 (72).

Camp Rapidan featured a large outdoor stone fireplace which was the backdrop for many photographs of the Hoovers and their guests.

At Rapidan Camp, President Hoover offered to buy Bermuda, Trinidad, and British Honduras from Prime Minister MacDonald in exchange for most of Britain's war debt (from World War I) to the United States. But days later came the Wall Street Crash that marked the beginning of the Great Depression. In addition, Hoover and MacDonald came to an agreement that formed the basis of the 1930 London Naval Treaty while meeting at Rapidan Camp, talking for hours sitting on an "historic log". Rapidan Camp also gave name to the "Rapidan Plan" for deploying the Girl Scouts of the USA to help alleviate the economic collapse.

=== Hoover's birthday opossum and the Mountain School ===
A well-publicized story arose in August 1929, when a boy who lived in the nearby mountains presented President Hoover with a live opossum on his 55th birthday. Six months later, the President arranged for a new schoolhouse in the area, which had been so remote that no school existed previously. The incident resulted in a variety of legends and a great deal of apocryphal media publicity, including tales that the boy had managed to sneak past the Marine guard on duty before giving the opossum to the President as a birthday present.

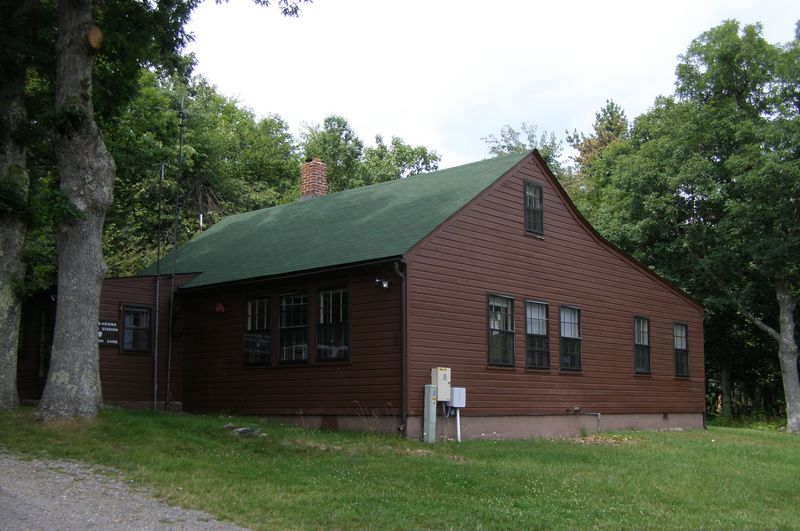
The schoolhouse in 2008. It was relocated in the late 1930s to the Big Meadows Ranger Area and converted to a ranger station. The rear section with lower-pitch roof was added after the move.

However, the best understanding of historians is that the story originated weeks earlier when Admiral Joel T. Boone, Hoover's physician, was exploring trails in the surrounding mountains and came upon an eleven-year-old boy named Ray Buracker. Boone learned that Buracker and his eight brothers and sisters had never attended school. The area in which they lived, known as Dark Hollow, had no school. When the President heard of Buracker, he said "Tell that boy if he will bring me an opossum down here I'll give him five dollars." Boone delivered the message, but nothing happened until August 10, the President's birthday, when Boone visited Dark Hollow again on horseback. The boy said he had caught an opossum for the President. With the inducement of riding to camp, the shy boy was persuaded to present his opossum directly to the President and his guest, Charles Lindbergh. Anne Morrow Lindbergh was amused to hear that Buracker and his friends had never heard of her famous husband.

The President raised money to build a small schoolhouse that included an apartment for Christine Vest, the teacher they hired. Vest had been trained in the special needs of education in remote mountain communities. The first year's class of twenty-two students ranged from 6 to 20 years of age.

The story of the backwoods mountain schoolhouse was publicized nationally, resulting in donations including schoolbooks, furniture, and a piano. The President took a personal interest in the school, and welcomed its students to the White House on numerous occasions. After Hoover left office, the student body dwindled as the surrounding population was forced via a blanket condemnation law to leave the area for the establishment of Shenandoah National Park in 1935. The school building was transported to Big Meadows on Skyline Drive and used as a ranger station and residence.

=== Cabinet Members' Camp ===
In 1930, Secretary of the Interior Ray Lyman Wilbur, Attorney General William D. Mitchell, and Secretary of Agriculture Arthur M. Hyde arranged for the Marines to construct a separate camp for members of Hoover's cabinet, 2 miles (3.2 km) downriver from the President's camp. The Cabinet Camp was built on land planned for incorporation into Shenandoah National Park, but still privately owned by the Madison Timber Corporation. No lease was signed, and a dispute arose about whether the Cabinet members had an oral contract with Madison Timber to construct the camp. Marines escorted timbermen off the property "by the seat of the pants," and Madison Timber was assessed property taxes for road and building improvements to which the Marines prohibited access. The conflict was covered in Time magazine, the Associated Press, and Madison Eagle newspaper. In 1931, the Ward-Rue Lumber Company filed a claim that it owned the property. Under the eventual settlement, cabinet members were allowed to use the camp throughout the Hoover administration, and the property owner resumed custody once Hoover left office. The National Park Service ran out of park expansion funds before purchasing the Cabinet Camp. The rising value of the property once the road and camp were constructed likely led the state to purchase cheaper park expansion land elsewhere.

In 1953, a cooperative of 14 families called Rapidan Camps was created to purchase the dilapidated Cabinet Camp from Ward-Rue. Rapidan Camps rehabilitated the cabins, and over the decades its membership has grown to approximately 100 families who share the facility as a seasonal retreat. The camp now has five cabins—three of the four original Hoover-era cabins and two constructed since in a similar architectural style. It is designated on local hiking maps as "Rapidan Family Camp" to distinguish it from the name the National Park Service restored to the President's main camp in 2004, "Rapidan Camp".

=== Marine Camp ===
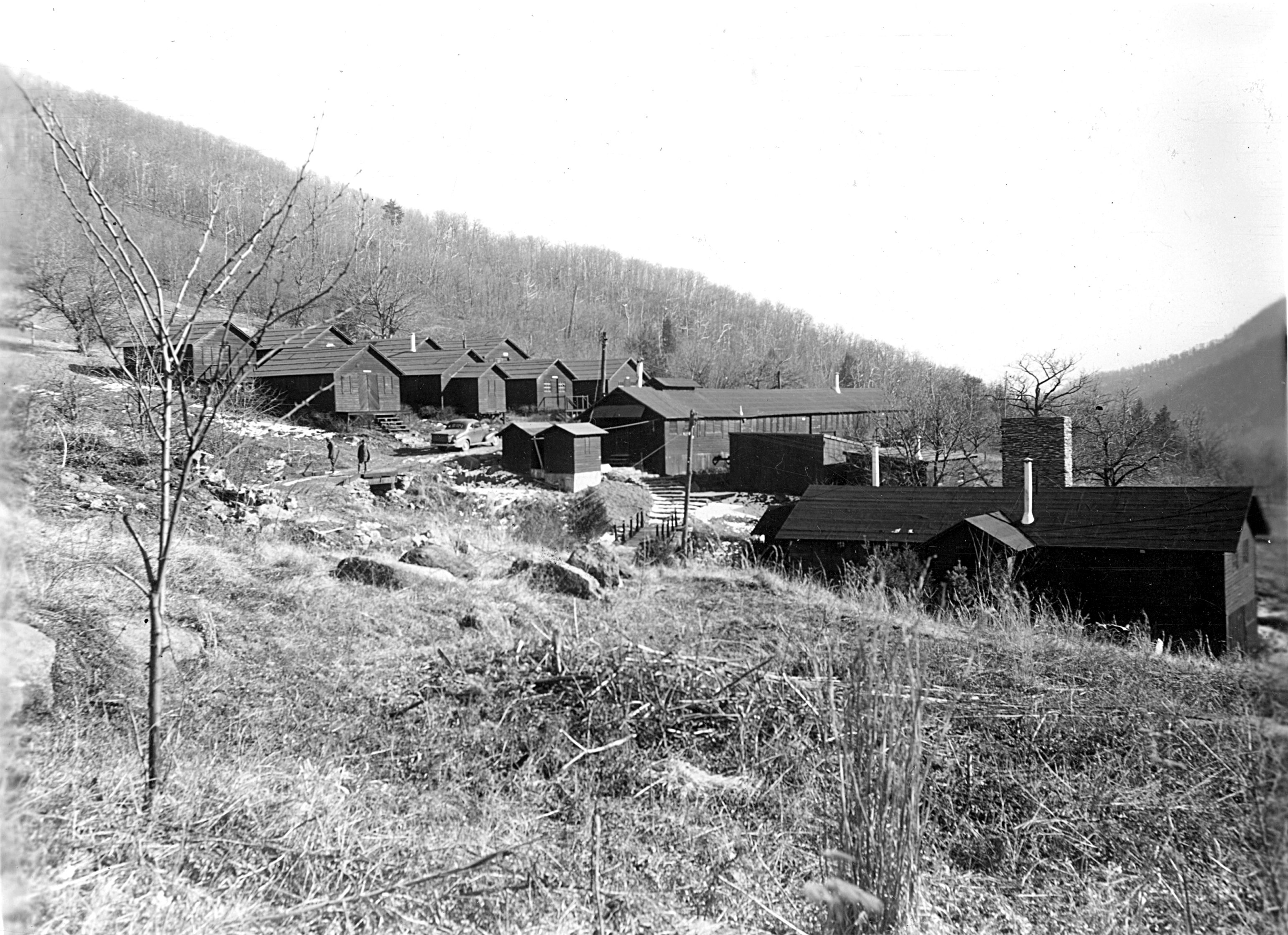
The Marine Camp

A separate camp was constructed 1 mile (1.6 km) to the east of Camp Rapidan to house the Marines who provided the camp's construction, maintenance, and security. The camp initially consisted largely of tents with a few wooden cabins, but more cabins eventually replaced the tents. Many Marines were selected for Rapidan duty due to their skills in carpentry, plumbing, and other work needed at camp. When the President was at camp, from 150 to 250 Marines were stationed there; during the winter only about a dozen.

When local Virginians complained that the Marines were not attending church, the President ordered a Navy Chaplain to provide Sunday services in the Marine Camp mess hall.

The Marine Camp was demolished in 1944.

== 1933–2000: Federal and Boy Scout camp ==
When President Hoover lost his bid for re-election in 1932, he and his wife offered the camp for use by subsequent presidents and donated the camp property to the federal government to become part of the new Shenandoah National Park then under development.

=== Roosevelt administration ===
With encouragement from Virginia Governor Pollard and Senator Byrd, President Franklin D. Roosevelt visited Rapidan Camp in 1933, but found the narrow trails too rough for his wheelchair, and the mountain streams too cold for swimming. A plan was drafted to install a heated swimming pool for Roosevelt, but never implemented. In 1935, Secretary of the Interior Harold L. Ickes reported, "President Roosevelt is not able to make such use of the camp as President Hoover undoubtedly had in mind. Whether it is to continue to be a Presidential camp must, therefore, be left for future determination." FDR went on to establish his retreat in the Catoctin Mountains of Maryland at Camp Shangri-La, later renamed Camp David. While the Park Service pledged to maintain Rapidan Camp, in 1936, The New York Times described rust and dry rot at the camp, which was still protected by seven Marines. The "historic log" Hoover and MacDonald had conferred on was destroyed by woodpeckers.

During FDR's tenure, Rapidan Camp was used by Cabinet members, particularly Secretary of the Navy Claude A. Swanson who spent much time at camp until he died there in 1939. The camp then fell into disrepair.

=== Boy Scout camp ===
In 1946, the Shenandoah Park Superintendent reported that the camp was unused and requested federal funds for repairs or demolition. In 1948, the Boy Scouts of America were granted a twenty-year lease to use it as a summer camp, which was also in accordance with Hoover's wishes. During its use as a Boy Scout camp, the facility was renamed "Camp Hoover." As maintenance costs rose, however, the Scouts withdrew from the lease in 1958. In 1960, the structures built by the Boy Scouts and many decayed Hoover-era buildings were demolished, leaving only three of the original buildings.

=== Federal retreat ===
From 1960 to 1963, further rehabilitation work was done at camp. Some presidents have expressed interest in the camp, but Jimmy Carter was the first president since FDR to visit. Until 1992, the camp was a vacation perk for high-ranking federal government officials, including Alaska Senator Ted Stevens and Vice President Walter Mondale, who was snowed in on one visit and had to be cut out by Secret Service officers with chainsaws. Vice President Al Gore was one of the last senior government executives to stay there overnight.

The camp was designated a National Historic Landmark in 1988, under the name "Camp Hoover".

== 2001–present: Restored, opened to public ==
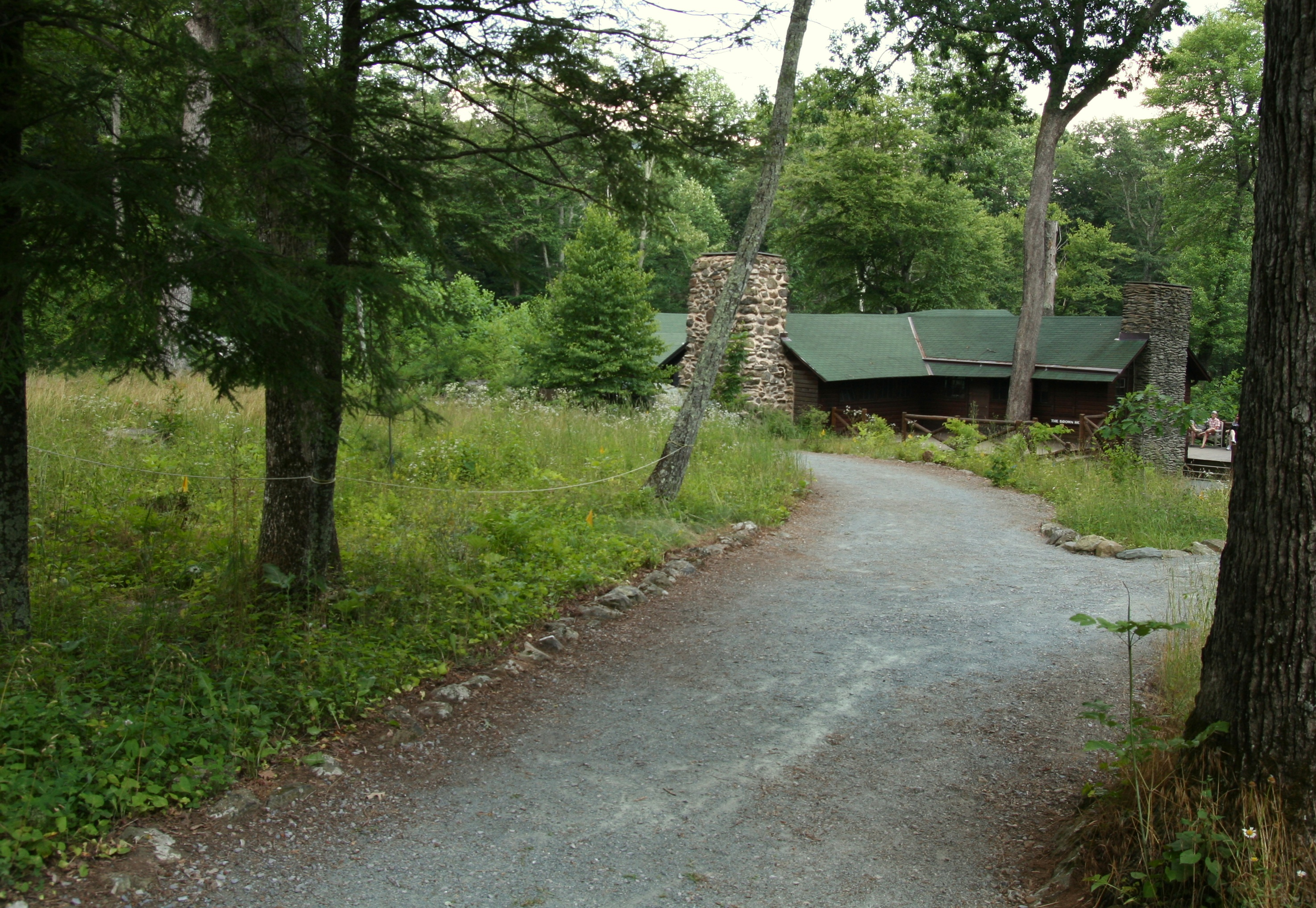
Rapidan Camp in 2007

In 2004, Shenandoah National Park completed a restoration of the grounds and the remaining three cabins to their condition in the era of the Hoover presidency. The three buildings are the Brown House (President's Cabin), the Prime Minister's Cabin, and the Creel. Interpretive signs have been installed to help visitors understand life in 1931, the midpoint of the Hoover presidency. The camp's name has been officially changed from Camp Hoover back to Rapidan Camp. During the restoration, many post-Hoover improvements were removed.

The river is still known for its trout fishing—Trout Unlimited lists it in their Guide to America's 100 Best Trout Streams.

=== Public access ===
Rapidan Camp is accessible by a 4.1 mile (6 km) round-trip hike on Mill Prong Trail, which begins on Skyline Drive at Milam Gap (Mile 52.8)—see the guide to the hike at. The National Park Service also offers guided van trips that leave from the Harry F. Byrd Visitor Center at Big Meadows. During much of the spring, summer, and fall, an interpretive guide stays at camp and provides tours. The Brown House is decorated as it was in Hoover's day; the Prime Minister's Cabin contains interpretive exhibits. The camp is also accessible from the extremely rough, unpaved Quaker Run Road accessible near Criglersville. However, vehicles are prohibited beyond a fire gate at the park boundary one mile from camp, with very limited parking. Visitors must reach the camp on foot, as bicycles are prohibited on unpaved roads within the park. Backcountry camping is prohibited within 1/2-mile (0.8 km) of Rapidan Camp.

== Architecture ==
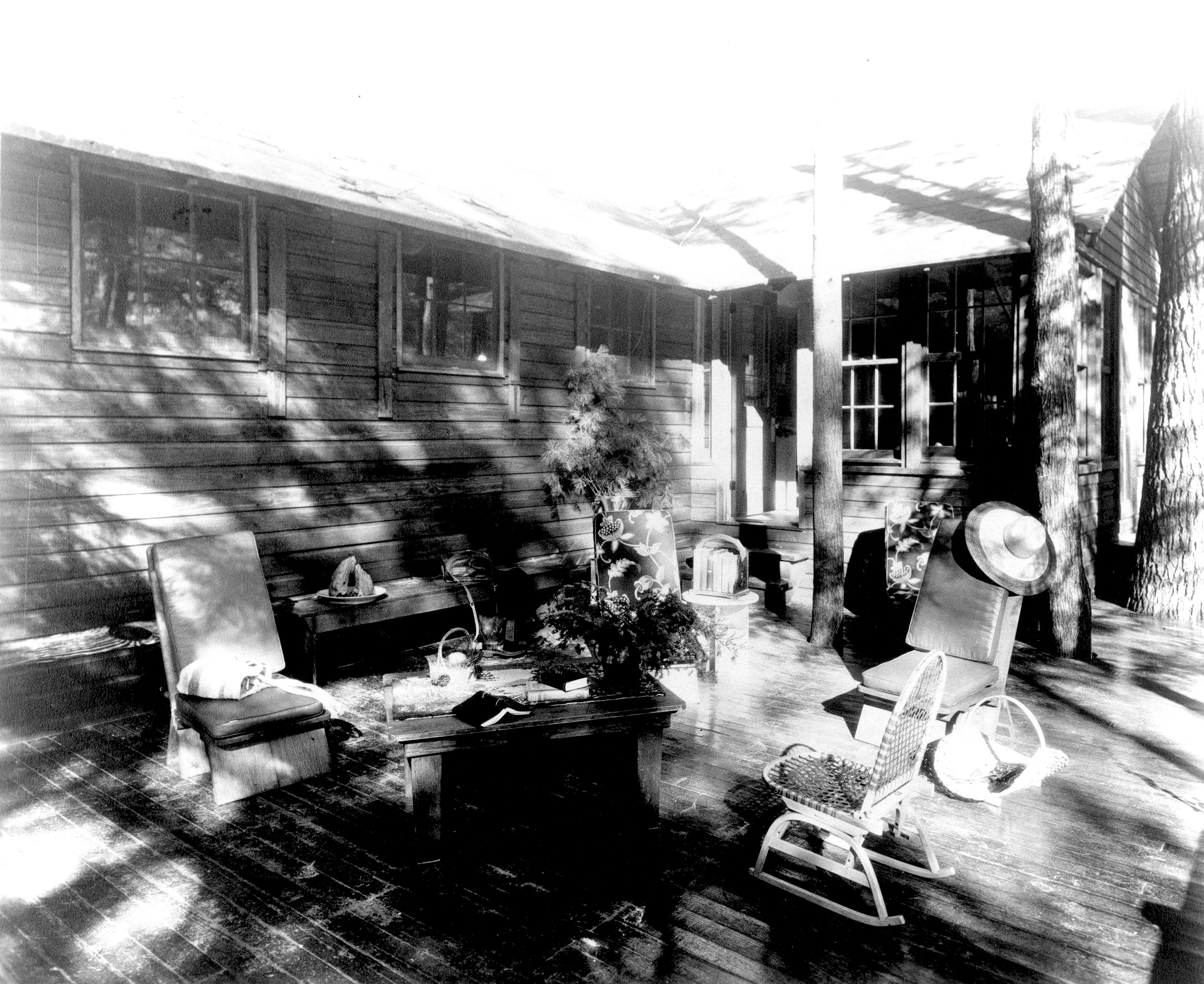
The cabin porches were built in place around existing trees

To design the cabins at Rapidan Camp, Lou Henry Hoover hired an architect who had built Girl Scout camps. The facilities were rustic by modern standards. Some of the early structures such as the original Five Tents had just a wooden floor and 3-foot-high (0.91 m) walls, with canvas tents above. Even the President's Cabin was built with single-wall uninsulated construction—slats of German Siding nailed to studs and exposed on both sides. There are no interior ceilings; rafters and roof boards are exposed. Shower stalls have tin walls and concrete floors. During Hoover's administration, cabin porches were decorated with boxes filled with geraniums, and interior floors were covered with grass rugs. The camp was modified throughout Hoover's presidency with new cabins and additions to existing cabins.

On cold days, large stone fireplaces provide some warmth, but were not intended to keep the camp warm in winter. There was no shortage of firewood in Hoover's day because the chestnut blight had ravaged the forest; after her first visit to the Rapidan area, Mrs. Hoover had written "There are innumerable, enormous dead chestnuts standing all over the place."

On hot days, hinged wooden panels fold down to expose large copper screens to provide ventilation. These panels and numerous windows cover most of the outside perimeter of the cabins. From the 1960s through 1980s, they hardly seemed necessary, for the hemlock trees formed a thick canopy and kept the shaded grounds cool. However, in the early 1990s, the hemlock woolly adelgid began destroying the hemlock trees, so the surrounding forest is again scattered with dead and fallen trees as in Hoover's day.

The cabins are equipped with electricity and plumbing, with visible wiring snaking along the walls and rafters. Large elevated outdoor decks were built with holes for the trunks of mature live trees, whose branches sheltered the cabins and porches.

A replica of a corner of the President's cabin and surrounding deck is located inside the Hoover Presidential Library in Iowa.

== See also ==
- List of National Historic Landmarks in Virginia
- National Register of Historic Places listings in Madison County, Virginia
