= Locust Hill (Locust Dale, Virginia) =

Historic house in Virginia, United States

- U.S. National Register of Historic Places
- Virginia Landmarks Register
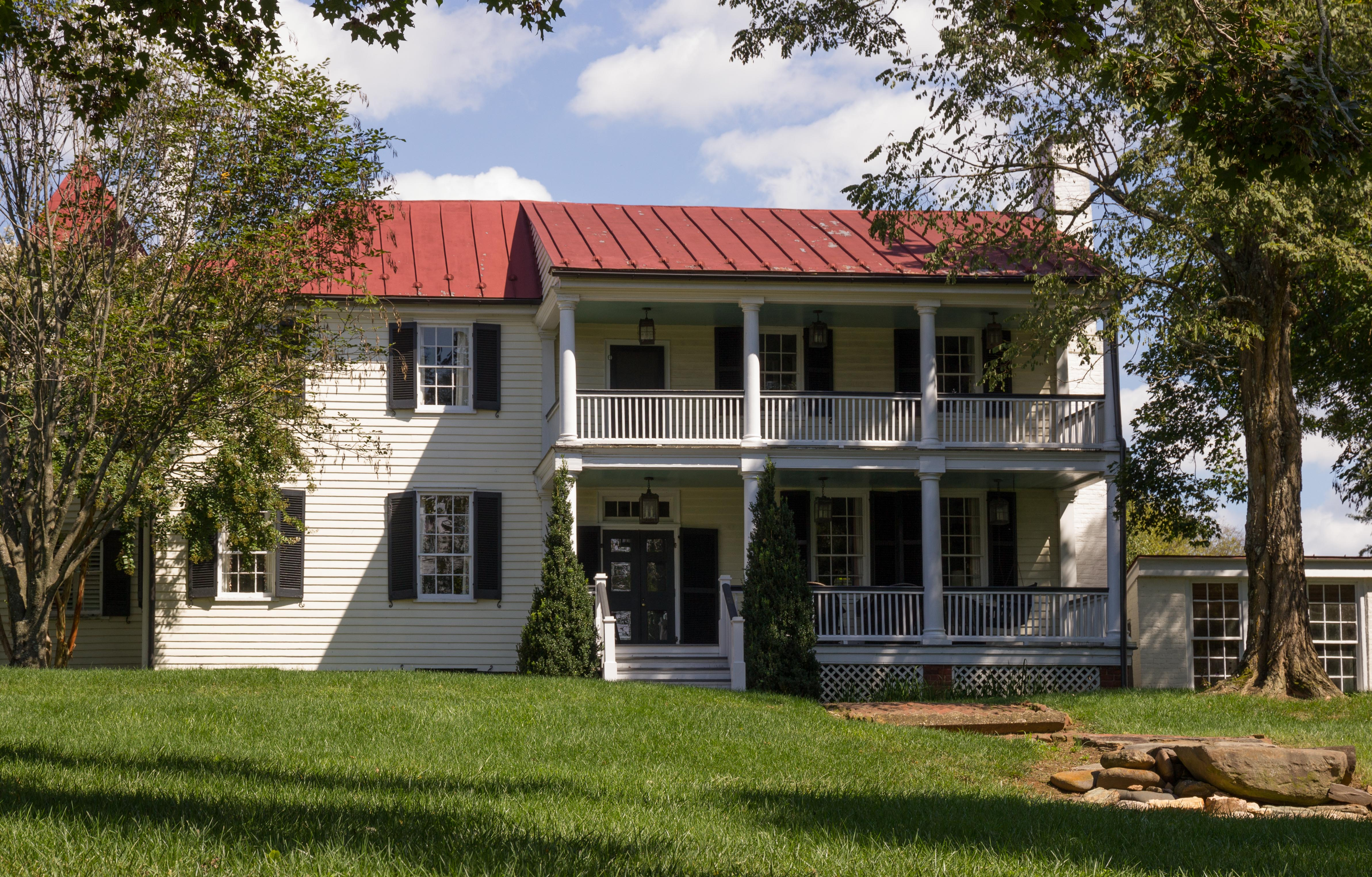

- Location within Virginia Location within the United States
- Location: Jct. of US 15, VA 634, and VA 614, Locust Dale, Virginia
- Coordinates: 38°20′17″N 78°07′33″W
- Area: 30 acres (12 ha)
- Built: 1834, 1849, c. 1900
- Built by: Mahanes, Harry
- Architectural style: Federal, Greek Revival
- NRHP reference No.: 02000590
- VLR No.: 056-5012

Significant dates
- Added to NRHP: May 30, 2002
- Designated VLR: March 13, 2002

Locust Hill is a historic home and farm complex at Locust Dale, Virginia. The two-story frame house incorporates an original side-passage- plan section dating to 1834. which was enlarged and given a two-tier Doric order front porch probably about 1849. About 1900 a three-story bathroom tower, a summer kitchen, and a brick greenhouse wing were added. The house includes Federal and Greek Revival style elements. Also on the property are the contributing Willis's School (1897), smokehouse, cistern, dairy, brick lined pit, the site of a water tower, chicken house, Locust Dale store and Post Office (1880s), and Fertilizer House (1934).

It was listed on the National Register of Historic Places in 2002.
