= Robertson Mountain =

Mountain in Virginia, US

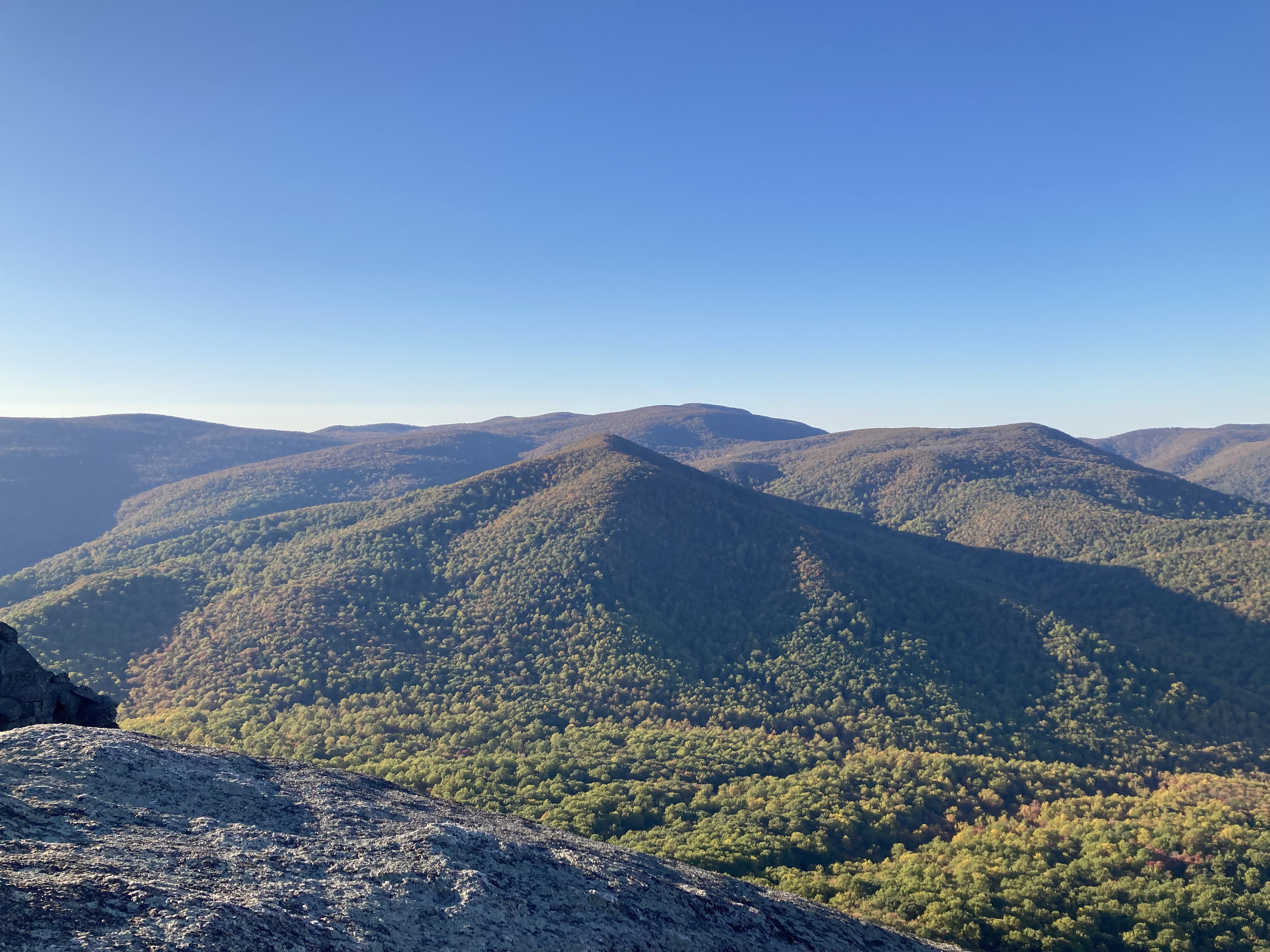
- Robertson Mountain pictured from the summit of nearby Old Rag

Highest point
- Elevation: 3,297 ft (1,005 m)
- Prominence: 528 ft (161 m)
- Coordinates: 38°34′12″N 78°20′32″W

Geography
- Location: Madison County, Virginia, U.S.
- Parent range: Blue Ridge Mountains
- Topo map: USGS Old Rag Mountain

Climbing
- Easiest route: Hike
- Robertson Mountain Site
- U.S. National Register of Historic Places
- Virginia Landmarks Register
- Location within Virginia Location within the United States
- Area: 0.1 acres (0.040 ha)
- NRHP reference No.: 85003173
- VLR No.: 056-0057

Significant dates
- Added to NRHP: December 13, 1985
- Designated VLR: September 16, 1982

Robertson Mountain is a 3,297 feet (1,005 m) mountain near Sperryville in Madison County, Virginia. It is part of the Blue Ridge Mountains and is the peak is located within Shenandoah National Park near the popular hiking area of Old Rag Mountain. Waters from the slopes of Robertson Mountain form the headwaters of the Rappahannock River.

Near Robertson Mountain is the Robertson Mountain Site, an archaeological site on the National Register of Historic Places and the Virginia Landmarks Register. The site was occupied by indigenous Americans throughout the Archaic period, and excavation at the site provided evidence of indigenous food gathering. According to its VLR listing, the site is one of the few in Shenandoah National Park that provides "clear evidence of stratified cultural deposits".

Robertson Mountain is accessed by a strenuous 7.8 miles (12.6 km) round-trip hike from the Old Rag parking area that gains 2,130 feet (650 m) of elevation. While it is climbed less frequently than the popular Old Rag, it offers open views to the north, west and south.
