= Nethers, Virginia =

Unincorporated community in Virginia, United States

- Unincorporated community
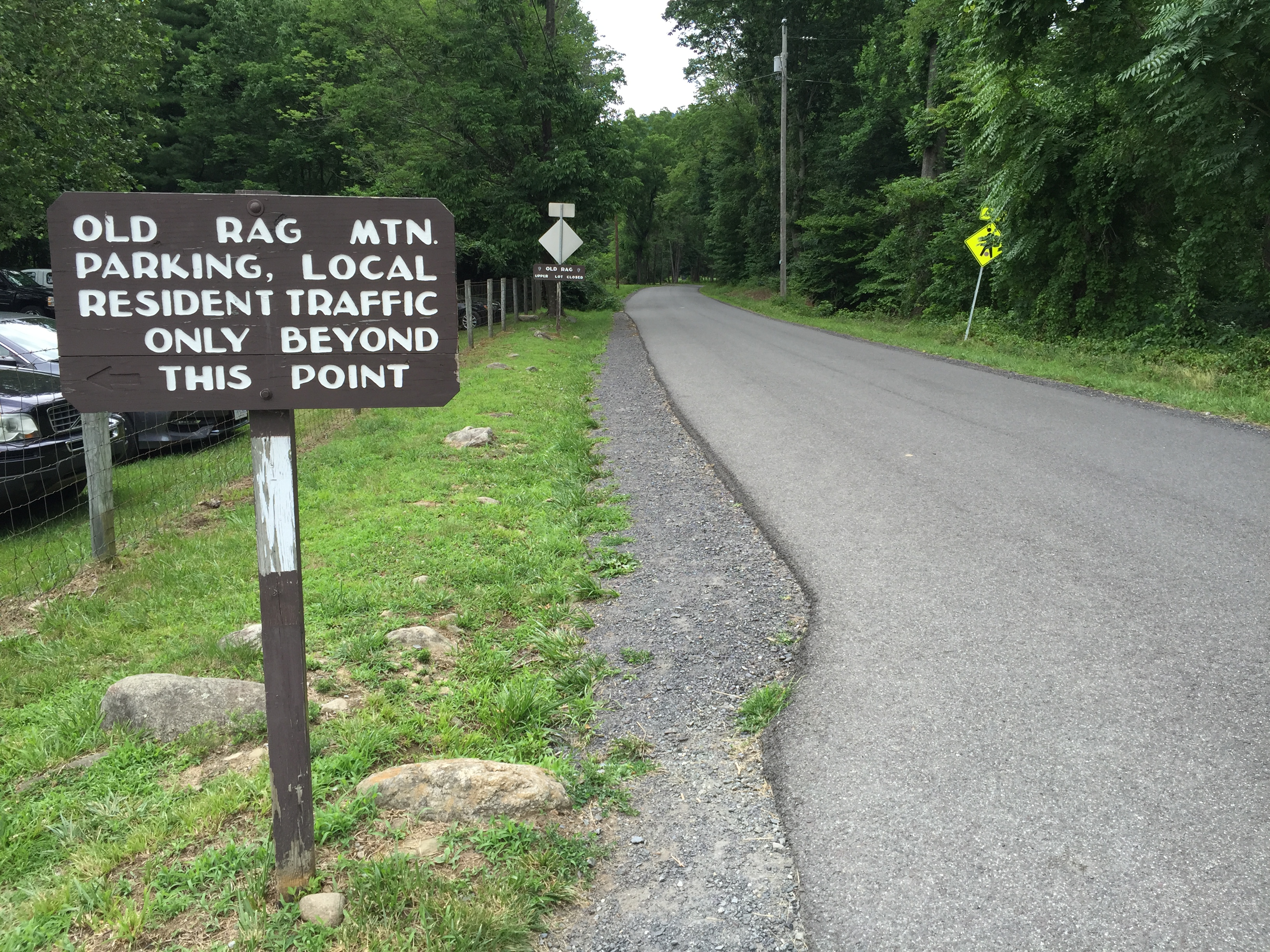
- Sign for the Old Rag Mountain parking lot along Nethers Road in Nethers

- Location within Virginia Location within the United States
- Coordinates: 38°34′13″N 78°16′40″W
- Country: United States
- State: Virginia
- County: Madison
- Elevation: 801 ft (244 m)
- Time zone: UTC-5 (Eastern (EST))
  - Summer (DST): UTC-4 (EDT)
- Area code: 540
- GNIS feature ID: 1495996

Nethers (also Neathers) is an unincorporated community located in Madison County, Virginia, United States. It is the primary access point for Old Rag Mountain in Shenandoah National Park.

== History ==
Nethers is named after the local Nethers family who were prominent land owners in the area.

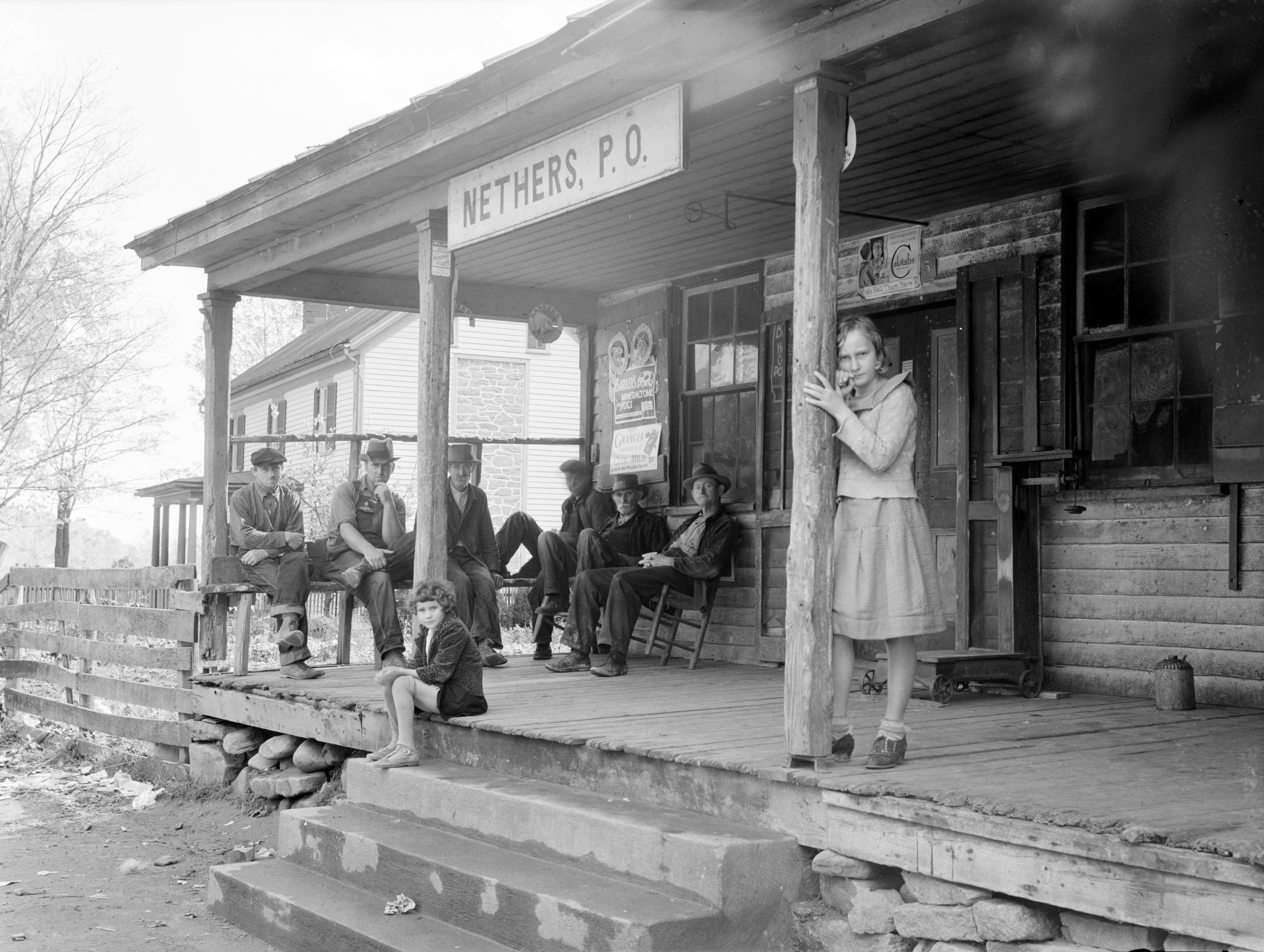
Nethers Store and Post Office, captured by Arthur Rothstein in October 1935.

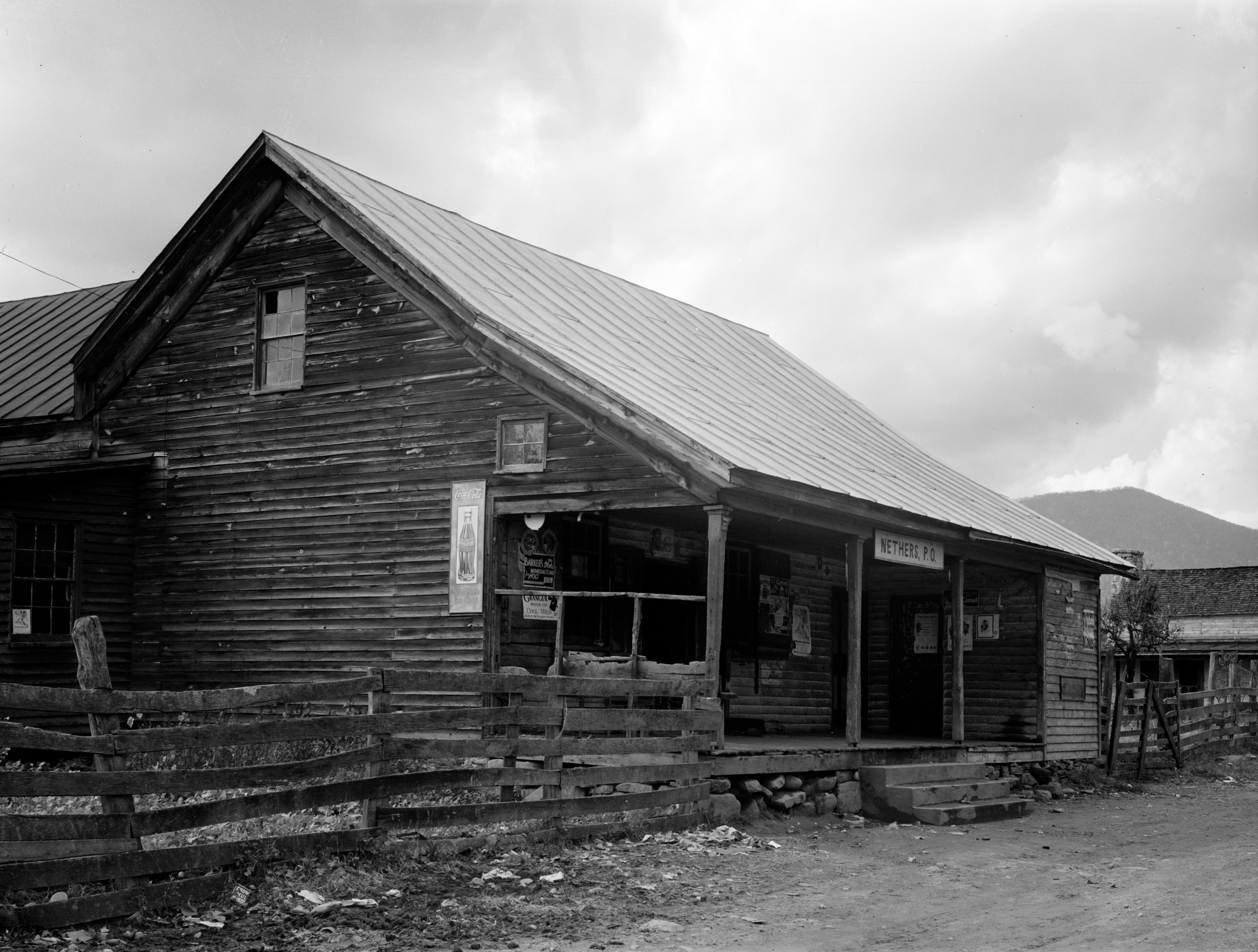
Nethers Store and Post Office, captured by Arthur Rothstein in October 1935.

Within Nethers is the Nethers Mill, a gristmill situated on the Hughes River. Accounts of when the mill was built vary. One account says that a previous land owner named James Ward built the mill in 1794. In 1818, Ward would sell 90 acres of land to Rowland Yowell for $1,000 (This land is believed to have included the mill, hence the high price). Another account states that it was Yowell who build the mill in 1824. However, due to the price Yowell paid for the land, the information about Ward, as well as the presence of grain farming in the area, the earlier date is more likely. Yowell would extend the mill in 1825 before selling it and 75 acres to Henry S. Snyder in 1831 for $1,000. Snyder would then sell the mill and 75 acres to William Clark in 1838 for $1,500. Clark would then sell the mill and 75 acres to John Huffman in 1843 for $850. John would then sell the mill and land to his son-in-law, Arnold Nethers (~1821-1886) in 1858 for $1,500. The mill was operational from the time it was built until 1943. The last miller, William "Tip" Clifton Nethers, died in 1944. It was the only mill in the county to be continuously operating from construction to final closure. It was also the first in the region to install equipment to make buckwheat flour. The mill also once included an attached sawmill. The mill is now privately owned, with the current owners making efforts to restore the mill.

The first Nethers family immigrants were Johann Gotfried Ludewig Neder (b. ~1745) and his wife Susanna Margaretha Schmid (b. ~1750), who immigrated to Virginia from Vorderweidenthal (then part of the Holy Roman Empire). In 1778, Johann bought 51 acres of land from the local Strothers family for "Twenty-five pounds Virginia money". He would eventually sell it back to the Strothers in 1788 for the same price before renting it to continue living there. Another notable structure in the community is the Nethers Cabin. The cabin, built in the late 1780s, still stands today, although on private property. The mill is located on the opposite side of the Hughes River. The cabin was restored by the Pettie family in the early 1960s, with an addition being made in 1970. In 1825, Johann and Susanna's son, John Nethers, would purchase 188 acres of land for $650, making the Nethers family substantial landowners. John's son, Arnold, would go on to marry Ellen Huffman, daughter of John Huffman and Julianna Blankenbaker. Arnold's son, James "Jimmy" William Nethers, would build a farmhouse next to the Nethers Cabin around 1904.

Arnold Nethers also owned a general store across the street from the mill. The store was built sometime in the mid-1800s. The store served the small community of Nethers as well as the 3 hollows that branch away from Nethers (Corbin, Nicholson, and Weakley). With the addition of a post office in a corner of the store in 1878, Nethers became an official mailing address (until the post office closed during World War II).

In October of 1935, FSA photographer Arthur Rothstein travelled to Nethers and the surrounding hollows for his first major assignment, photograph residents of the Shenandoah Valley before they were forcibly relocated to make way for the creation of Shenandoah National Park.

Corbin Cabin was listed on the National Register of Historic Places in 1989.

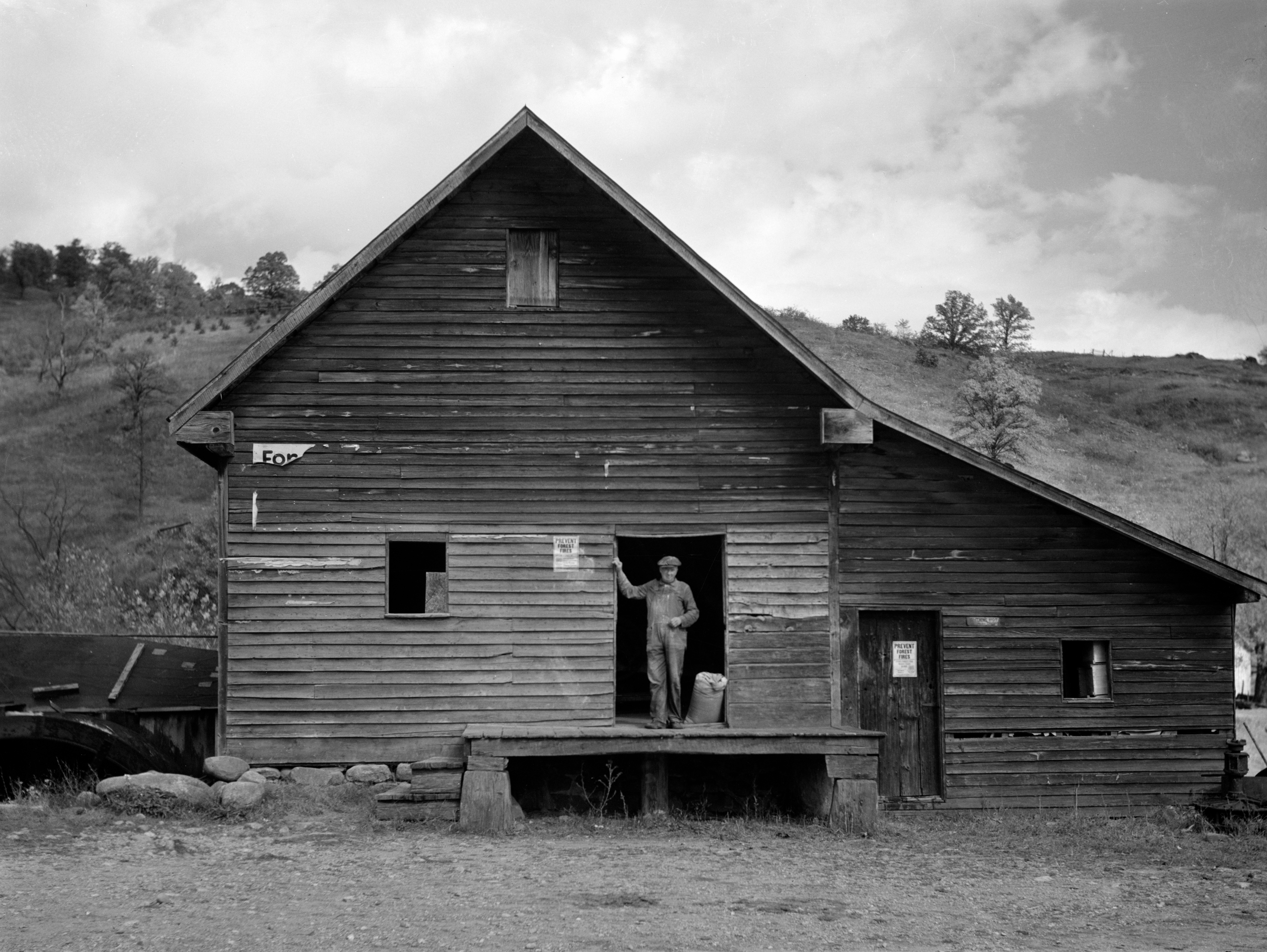
Nethers Mill, captured by Arthur Rothstein in October 1935. William "Tip" Clifton Nethers, the mill's last miller, can be seen in the doorway.

== See also ==
- Shenandoah National Park
- Old Rag Mountain
