= Big Meadows =

- Big Meadows Site
- U.S. National Register of Historic Places
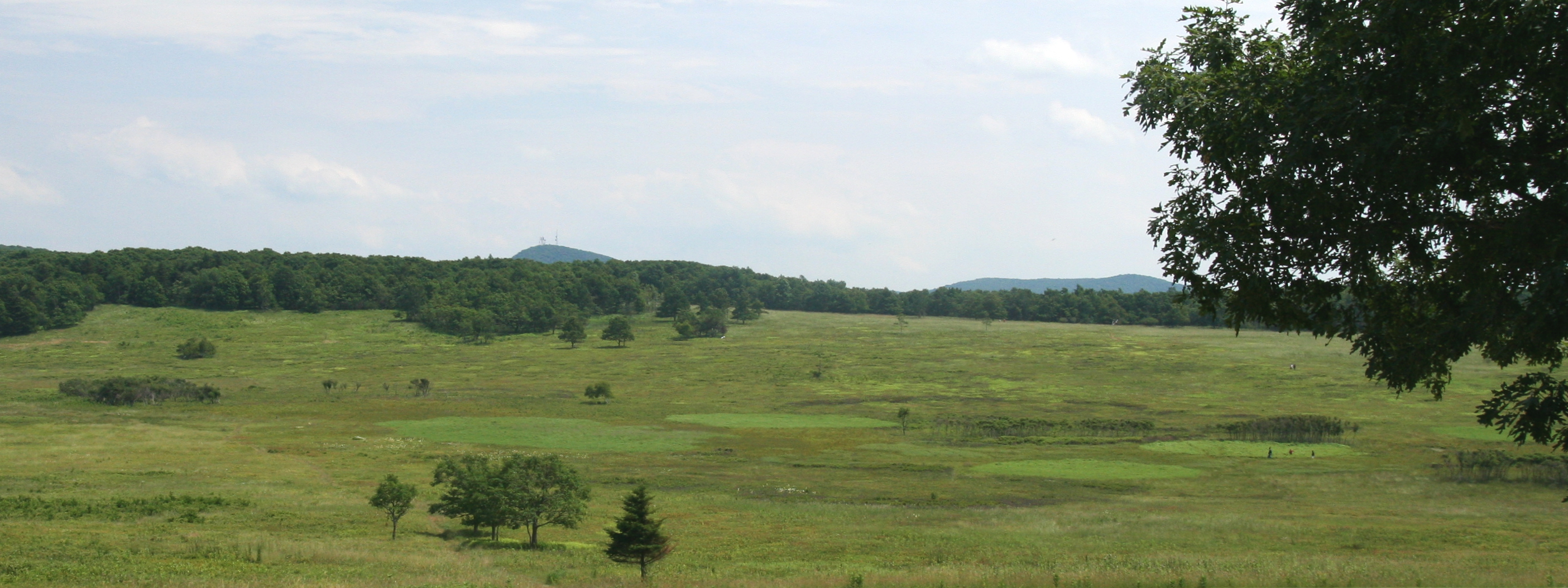
- Big Meadows in Summer

- Location within Virginia
- Nearest city: Luray, Virginia
- Coordinates: 38°31′20″N 78°26′13″W
- Area: 0.1 acres (0.040 ha)
- NRHP reference No.: 85003172
- Added to NRHP: December 13, 1985

Big Meadows is a recreational area of the Shenandoah National Park in Madison County and Page County, in the US state of Virginia. The meadow is located on the Skyline Drive at Milepost 51 and contains the park's Harry F. Byrd Visitor Center, a lodge, camp store, and camping area. Several hiking trails can be accessed from Big Meadows, including the Mill Prong Trail which leads to Rapidan Camp on the Rapidan River, the fishing retreat of President Herbert Hoover from 1929–1933, which is now restored to its 1930s configuration.

President Roosevelt used Big Meadows in 1935 as the site for dedicating Shenandoah National Park and Skyline Drive. In 1962, during the Ash Wednesday Storm, Big Meadows recorded Virginia's greatest 24-hour snowfall with 33 inches, and the total storm snowfall was 42 inches at Big Meadows. In the Blizzard of 1996, Big Meadows recorded Virginia's greatest storm snowfall accumulation at 47 inches. Big Meadows Site was added to the National Register of Historic Places in 1985.

== Activities ==
Big Meadows has a dining hall, gift shop, horse trails, and a series of lodges for guests to stay in. Each lodge guestroom has a stone fireplace and a supply of firewood, although the building has natural gas-fired central heating - the fireplaces are for decorative purposes only.

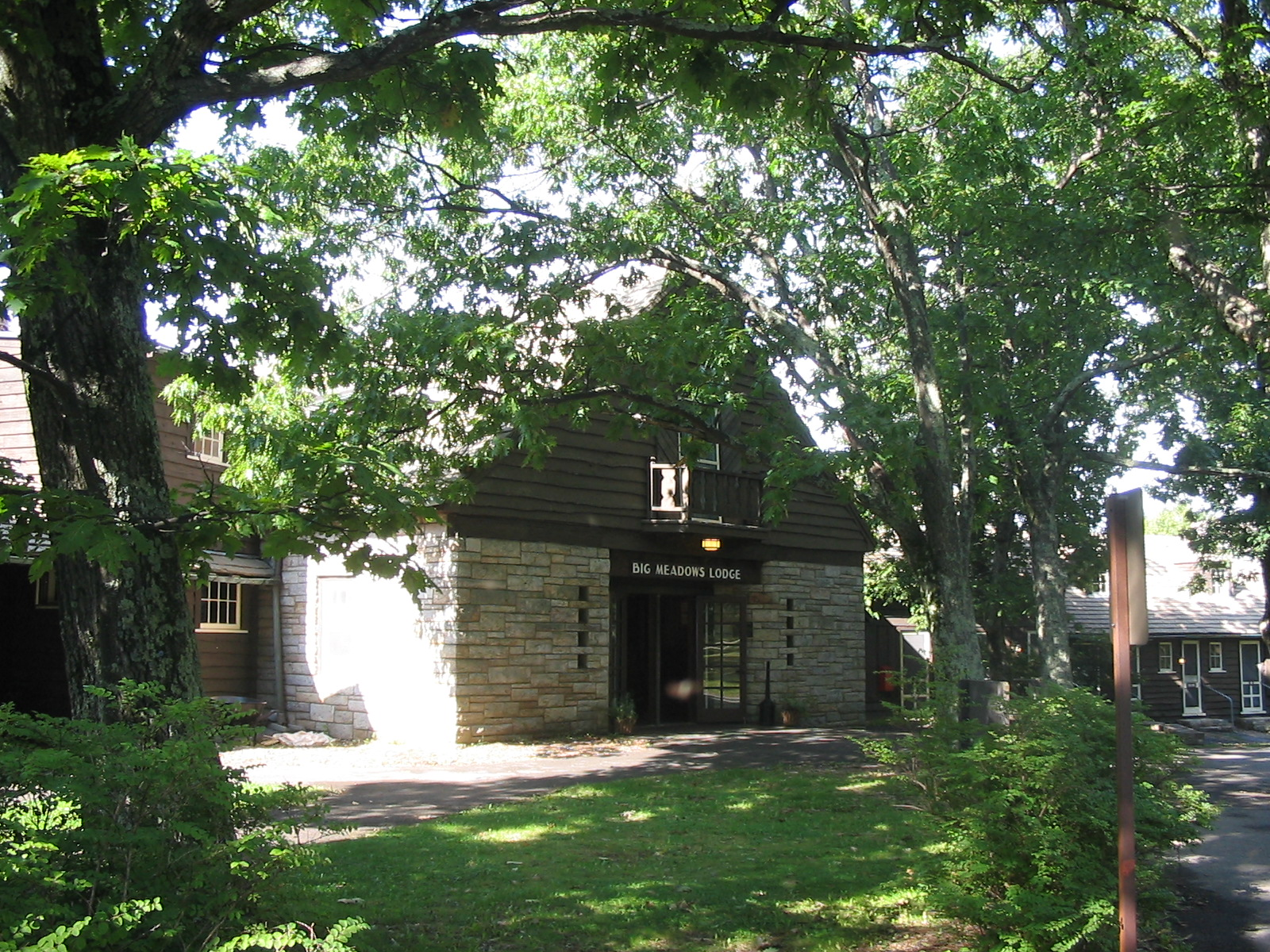
Entrance to the Big Meadows Lodge

Big Meadows Wayside has a campground with some 200 lots. There is a shower building, laundry accommodations, a storage building for packaged campfire wood, and a small office at which ice, firewood and basic supplies can be purchased.

There are several hiking trails:

Lewis Spring Falls follows the Appalachian Trail for about 1.5 miles (2.4 km) from the main campground to the falls overlook. It is an easy trail with standard hard-packed pebbles and dirt, with a few rock scrambles along the way.
Dark Hollow Falls begins at a parking lot close to the Byrd Center. From the parking lot, a 0.7-mile (1.1 km) trail takes hikers to overlooks at the top and bottom of the falls. The trail is scenic and wide, but somewhat steep on the return.

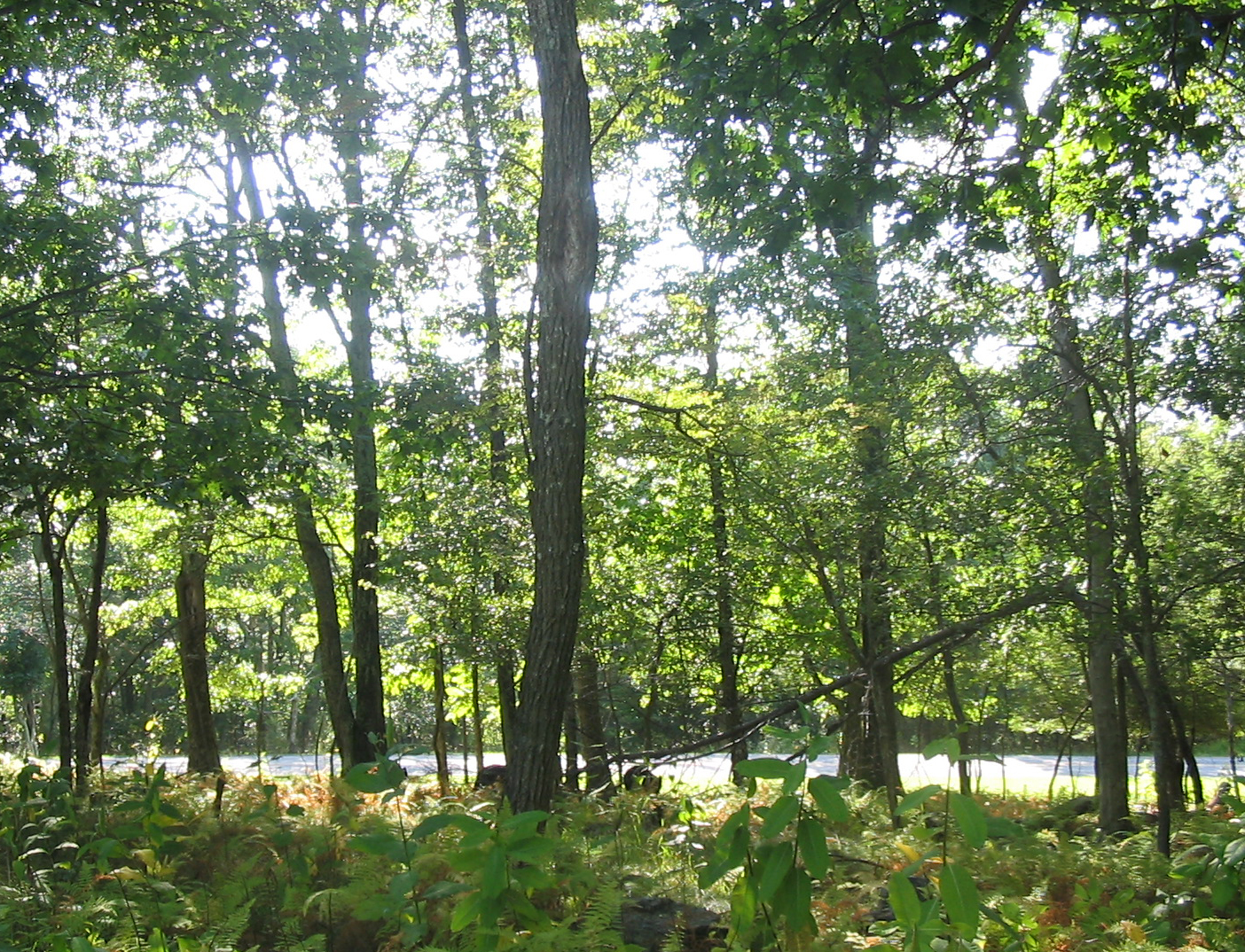
Woods at Big Meadows; a mother bear and two cubs are barely visible at center

The summit of Blackrock Mountain is located 0.3 mile (0.5 km) from the main campground and adjacent to the Big Meadows Lodge. It is the highest point at Big Meadows and provides a scenic view of the Shenandoah Valley.

== The Big Meadow ==
A part of the campground area, called The Big Meadow, is adjacent to the camp store and the Byrd Visitor center. Campers often wander the grassy trails of the meadow, looking for blueberries and blackberries. Usually, bears have already foraged the ripe berries before hikers arrive; in early-morning hikes, bears are sometimes spotted around the edges of the meadow.

== Wildlife ==
There are white-tailed deer, chipmunks, skunks, squirrels and a variety of birds who visit the campground area and are very used to people. The deer are eager to find campers who will hand out food and treats. The rangers discourage this, but the result is that the deer wander the campgrounds throughout the day. It is not uncommon to have a deer take food from a human's hand in a campsite. Daytime bear sightings are not uncommon. The black bears are not aggressive, and no attacks on humans have been reported. The park provides bear-proof metal lockers around the camp area to protect food at night.

The biggest concern is the skunk population. Like the deer, they forage the campsites for food. Campers will sometimes note the aroma of a skunk who was startled during the night. Wise campers ensure there is no food on the ground to attract skunks, and that the tent flap is secured against skunk entry.

Other wildlife includes venomous snakes, although they are relatively rare. The park houses rattlesnakes and copperheads, as well as garter snakes and other non-venomous species.

== Climate ==
The hottest temperature recorded in Big Meadows was 95 °F (35.0 °C) on July 24, 1991, while the coldest temperature recorded was −26 °F (−32.2 °C) on January 18, 1994.

Climate data for Big Meadows, Virginia, 1991–2020 normals, extremes 1935–2012
Month	Jan	Feb	Mar	Apr	May	Jun	Jul	Aug	Sep	Oct	Nov	Dec	Year
Record high °F (°C)	76 (24)	67 (19)	78 (26)	87 (31)	89 (32)	89 (32)	95 (35)	92 (33)	90 (32)	94 (34)	75 (24)	68 (20)	95 (35)
Mean maximum °F (°C)	54.4 (12.4)	57.0 (13.9)	66.1 (18.9)	75.7 (24.3)	77.7 (25.4)	81.2 (27.3)	84.0 (28.9)	82.6 (28.1)	79.3 (26.3)	73.3 (22.9)	64.5 (18.1)	57.0 (13.9)	85.3 (29.6)
Mean daily maximum °F (°C)	35.6 (2.0)	38.0 (3.3)	43.6 (6.4)	57.0 (13.9)	64.4 (18.0)	70.2 (21.2)	74.8 (23.8)	72.5 (22.5)	69.2 (20.7)	58.0 (14.4)	48.1 (8.9)	39.5 (4.2)	55.9 (13.3)
Daily mean °F (°C)	27.3 (−2.6)	29.7 (−1.3)	35.1 (1.7)	46.9 (8.3)	55.3 (12.9)	62.3 (16.8)	67.1 (19.5)	65.1 (18.4)	60.5 (15.8)	49.8 (9.9)	39.8 (4.3)	31.5 (−0.3)	47.5 (8.6)
Mean daily minimum °F (°C)	19.1 (−7.2)	21.5 (−5.8)	26.6 (−3.0)	36.7 (2.6)	46.3 (7.9)	54.4 (12.4)	59.3 (15.2)	57.7 (14.3)	51.8 (11.0)	41.5 (5.3)	31.6 (−0.2)	23.5 (−4.7)	39.2 (4.0)
Mean minimum °F (°C)	−3.0 (−19.4)	0.8 (−17.3)	5.9 (−14.5)	18.4 (−7.6)	30.7 (−0.7)	40.4 (4.7)	46.1 (7.8)	44.4 (6.9)	35.3 (1.8)	24.7 (−4.1)	15.5 (−9.2)	2.8 (−16.2)	−6.7 (−21.5)
Record low °F (°C)	−26 (−32)	−14 (−26)	−6 (−21)	6 (−14)	14 (−10)	31 (−1)	34 (1)	31 (−1)	25 (−4)	12 (−11)	−1 (−18)	−15 (−26)	−26 (−32)
Average precipitation inches (mm)	3.85 (98)	3.15 (80)	3.93 (100)	4.36 (111)	4.63 (118)	4.49 (114)	4.72 (120)	3.85 (98)	5.66 (144)	4.13 (105)	4.43 (113)	3.59 (91)	50.79 (1,292)
Average snowfall inches (cm)	10.3 (26)	9.7 (25)	6.4 (16)	1.4 (3.6)	0.0 (0.0)	0.0 (0.0)	0.0 (0.0)	0.0 (0.0)	0.0 (0.0)	0.2 (0.51)	2.7 (6.9)	5.8 (15)	36.5 (93.01)
Average extreme snow depth inches (cm)	8.2 (21)	7.7 (20)	6.8 (17)	1.5 (3.8)	0.0 (0.0)	0.0 (0.0)	0.0 (0.0)	0.0 (0.0)	0.0 (0.0)	0.2 (0.51)	2.2 (5.6)	3.9 (9.9)	13.7 (35)
Average precipitation days (≥ 0.01 in)	8.3	8.0	9.1	10.0	12.0	9.9	11.8	10.5	10.3	8.2	7.2	8.2	113.5
Average snowy days (≥ 0.1 in)	3.7	2.7	2.3	0.8	0.0	0.0	0.0	0.0	0.0	0.1	0.8	2.6	13.0
Source 1: NOAA
Source 2: XMACIS2 (mean maxima/minima, precip/precip days, snow/snow days/snow depth 1981–2010)

Climate data for Big Meadows Visitor Center, Shenandoah National Park. Elev: 3474 ft (1059 m)
Month	Jan	Feb	Mar	Apr	May	Jun	Jul	Aug	Sep	Oct	Nov	Dec	Year
Mean daily maximum °F (°C)	34.9 (1.6)	38.4 (3.6)	47.2 (8.4)	59.0 (15.0)	66.5 (19.2)	74.4 (23.6)	77.6 (25.3)	76.4 (24.7)	68.6 (20.3)	58.5 (14.7)	50.4 (10.2)	38.0 (3.3)	57.6 (14.2)
Daily mean °F (°C)	26.1 (−3.3)	28.9 (−1.7)	36.4 (2.4)	47.5 (8.6)	55.9 (13.3)	63.9 (17.7)	67.7 (19.8)	66.4 (19.1)	59.3 (15.2)	49.0 (9.4)	40.4 (4.7)	29.4 (−1.4)	47.7 (8.7)
Mean daily minimum °F (°C)	17.3 (−8.2)	19.5 (−6.9)	25.6 (−3.6)	36.0 (2.2)	45.3 (7.4)	53.4 (11.9)	57.8 (14.3)	56.3 (13.5)	50.0 (10.0)	39.5 (4.2)	30.5 (−0.8)	20.7 (−6.3)	37.7 (3.2)
Average precipitation inches (mm)	3.48 (88)	3.51 (89)	4.28 (109)	4.76 (121)	4.94 (125)	4.80 (122)	5.36 (136)	4.19 (106)	6.26 (159)	4.22 (107)	4.93 (125)	4.22 (107)	54.95 (1,396)
Average relative humidity (%)	66.9	67.8	57.2	62.7	69.1	74.9	75.0	71.2	74.2	75.2	65.1	68.2	69.0
Average dew point °F (°C)	16.6 (−8.6)	19.6 (−6.9)	22.7 (−5.2)	35.4 (1.9)	45.9 (7.7)	55.8 (13.2)	59.5 (15.3)	56.8 (13.8)	51.1 (10.6)	41.5 (5.3)	29.6 (−1.3)	20.2 (−6.6)	38.0 (3.3)
Source: PRISM Climate Group
