= Corbin Cabin =

Historic house in Virginia, United States

- George T. Corbin Cabin
- U.S. National Register of Historic Places
- Virginia Landmarks Register
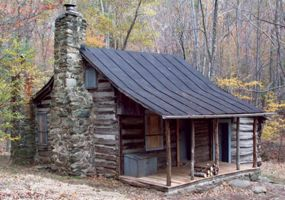
- Corbin Cabin

- Location within Virginia Location within the United States
- Location: 1.5 mi. off Skyline Dr. at jct. of Corbin Cabin Trail and Nicholson Hollow Trail, near Nethers, Virginia
- Coordinates: 38°36′7″N 78°20′42″W
- Built: 1909
- Architectural style: Mountain log cabin
- NRHP reference No.: 88003067
- VLR No.: 056-0061

Significant dates
- Added to NRHP: January 13, 1989
- Designated VLR: September 20, 1988

The Corbin Cabin is a log structure built by George T. Corbin in 1909 in the Nicholson Hollow area of what is now Shenandoah National Park. Corbin was forced to vacate the land on which the cabin sits in 1938, when the land was added to Shenandoah National Park. The cabin is unique in that it is one of a small number of buildings located in Nicholson Hollow spared during the creation of the park, and still remains standing despite recent forest fires.

The cabin is maintained by the Potomac Appalachian Trail Club and is accessible within the park by means of Nicholson Hollow Trail.

As the George T. Corbin Cabin, it was added to the National Register of Historic Places in 1989.
