= Royal Academy Exhibition of 1856 =

1856 art exhibition in London

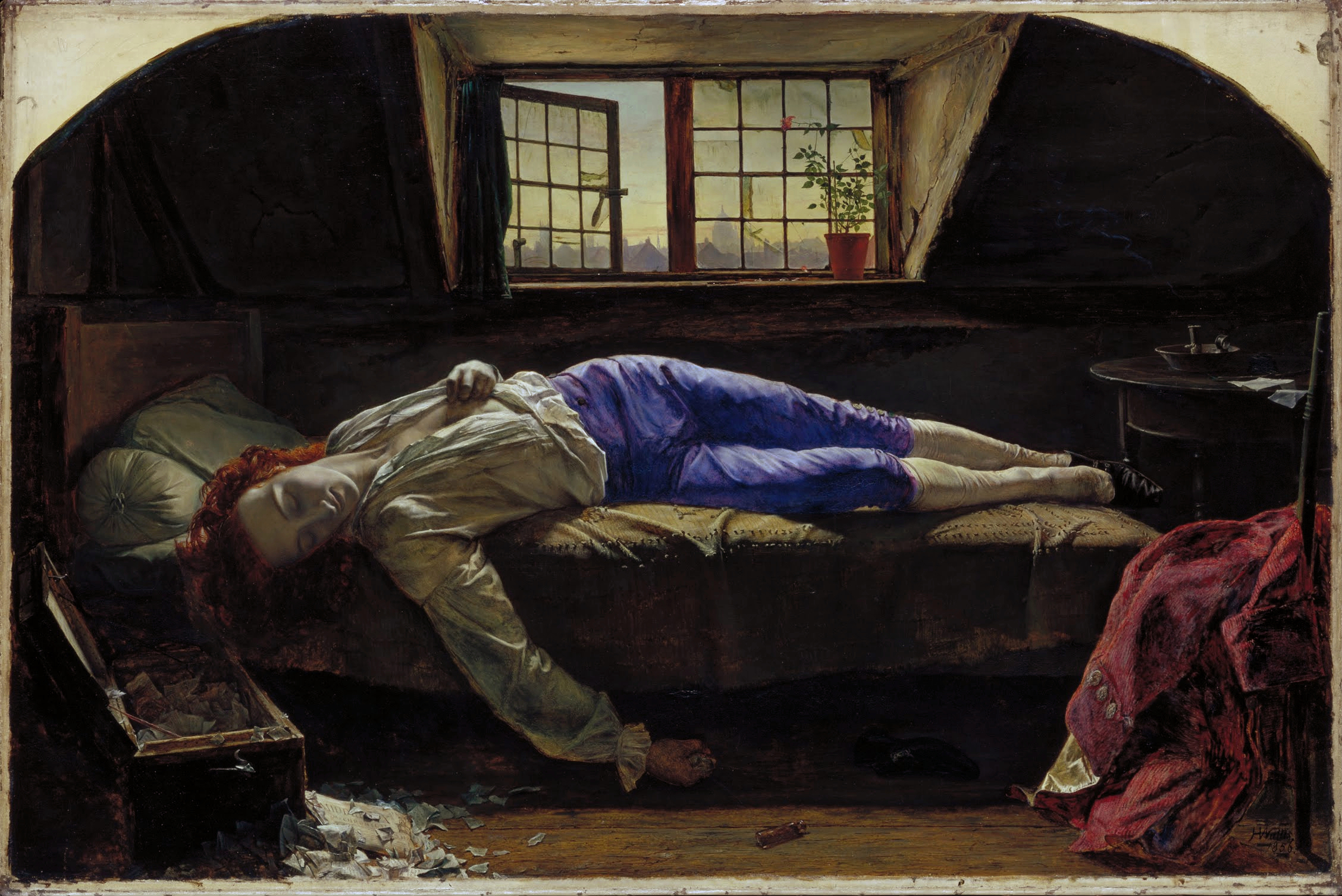
The Death of Chatterton by Henry Wallis

The Royal Academy Exhibition of 1856 was the annual Summer Exhibition of the British Royal Academy of Arts, the eighty eighth to be held. It was staged at the National Gallery in London between 5 May and 26 July 1856 during the Victorian era. Taking place the year the Crimean War ended with the Treaty of Paris, a number of paintings made reference to the recent conflict. Peace Concluded by John Everett Millais features a wounded army officer reading news of the peace. Other works displayed by Millais were Autumn Leaves, L'Enfant du Regiment and The Blind Girl. His fellow Pre-Raphaelites were also prominent with William Holman Hunt displaying The Scapegoat, April Love by Arthur Hughes and The Death of Chatterton by Henry Wallis. The Illustrated London News commented on the absence of many established members of the academy, including the president Charles Lock Eastlake.

John Phillip submitted genre scenes of Spanish life, while fellow members of The Clique William Powell Frith and Edward Matthew Ward were also represented. The cityscape Christmas Day at St Peter's, Rome by David Roberts was widely acclaimed by critics, even John Ruskin who as usually unsympathetic to the artist's works. One of the major hits of the exhibition was the marine painter Clarkson Stanfield's The Abandoned depicting an abandoned ship adrift in the ocean. Today its whereabouts are unknown. Edwin Landseer submitted the sentimental animal genre scene Saved!. Francis Grant, a future president of the academy, displayed portraits of Lord Raglan and Lord Lucan, two of the commanders during the Crimean War. Dutch artist Ary Scheffer produced a Portrait of Charles Dickens. Charles-Édouard Boutibonne's companion portraits of the French Emperor Napoleon III and his wife Eugénie were acquired by Queen Victoria for the Royal Collection.

== Gallery ==
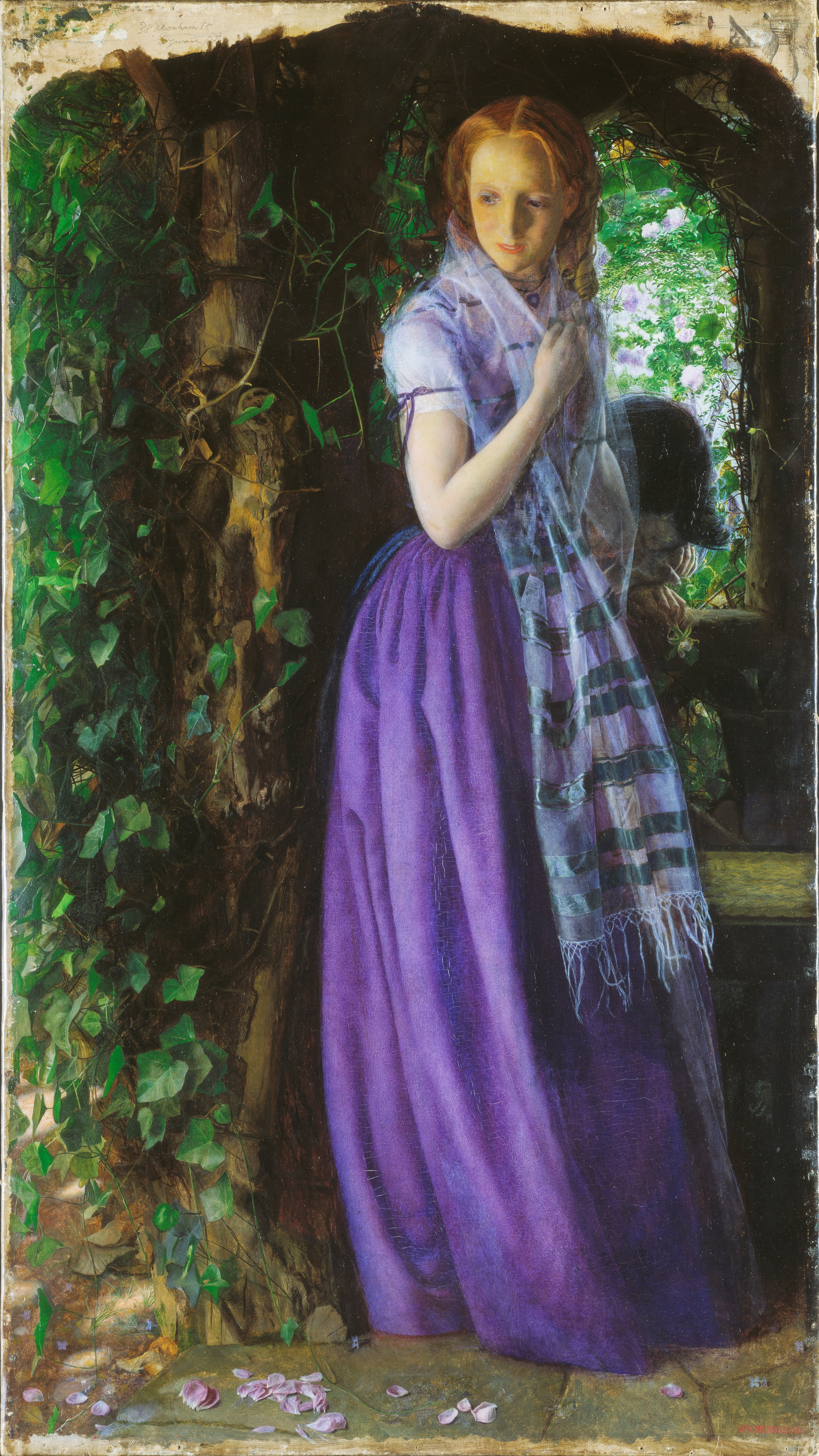
April Love by Arthur Hughes

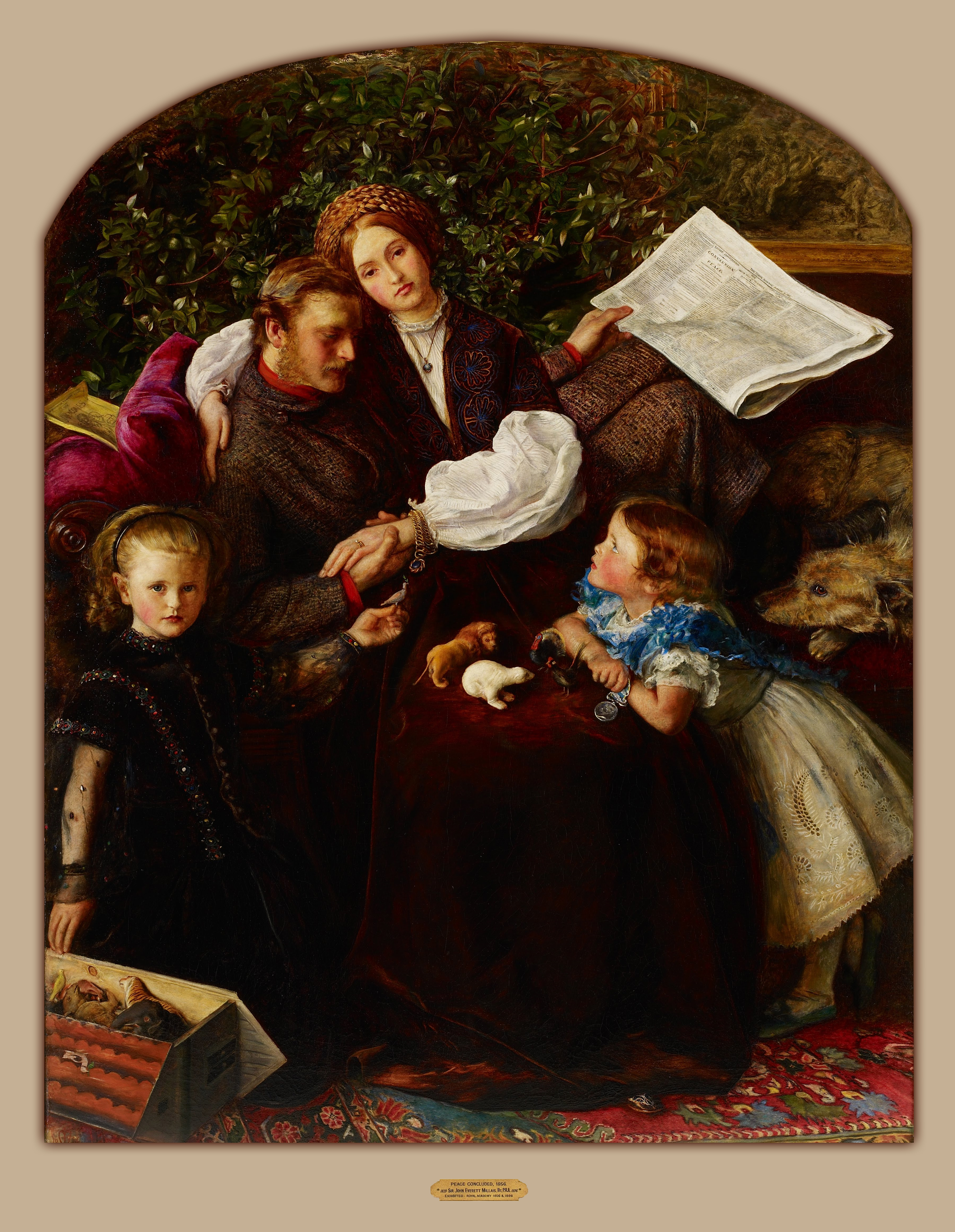
Peace Concluded by John Everett Millais

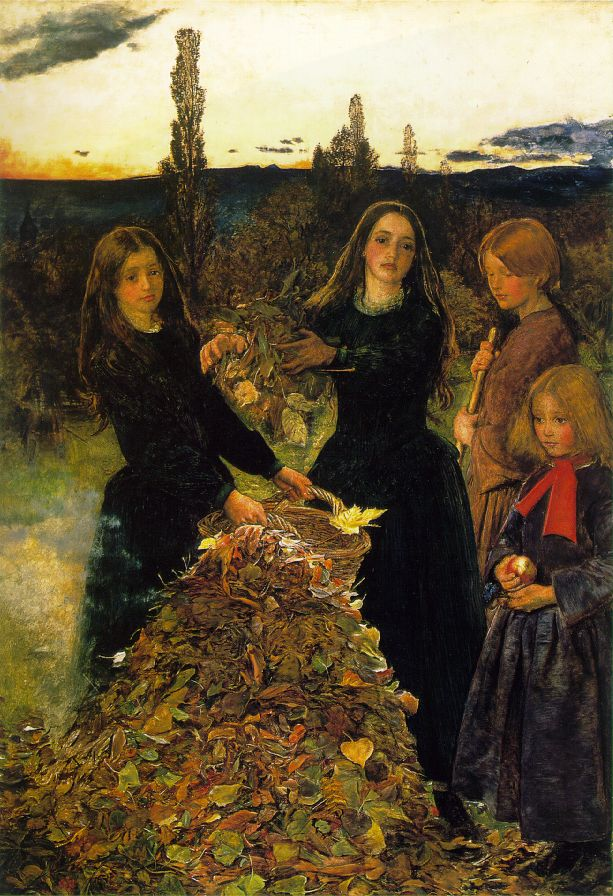
Autumn Leaves by John Everett Millais

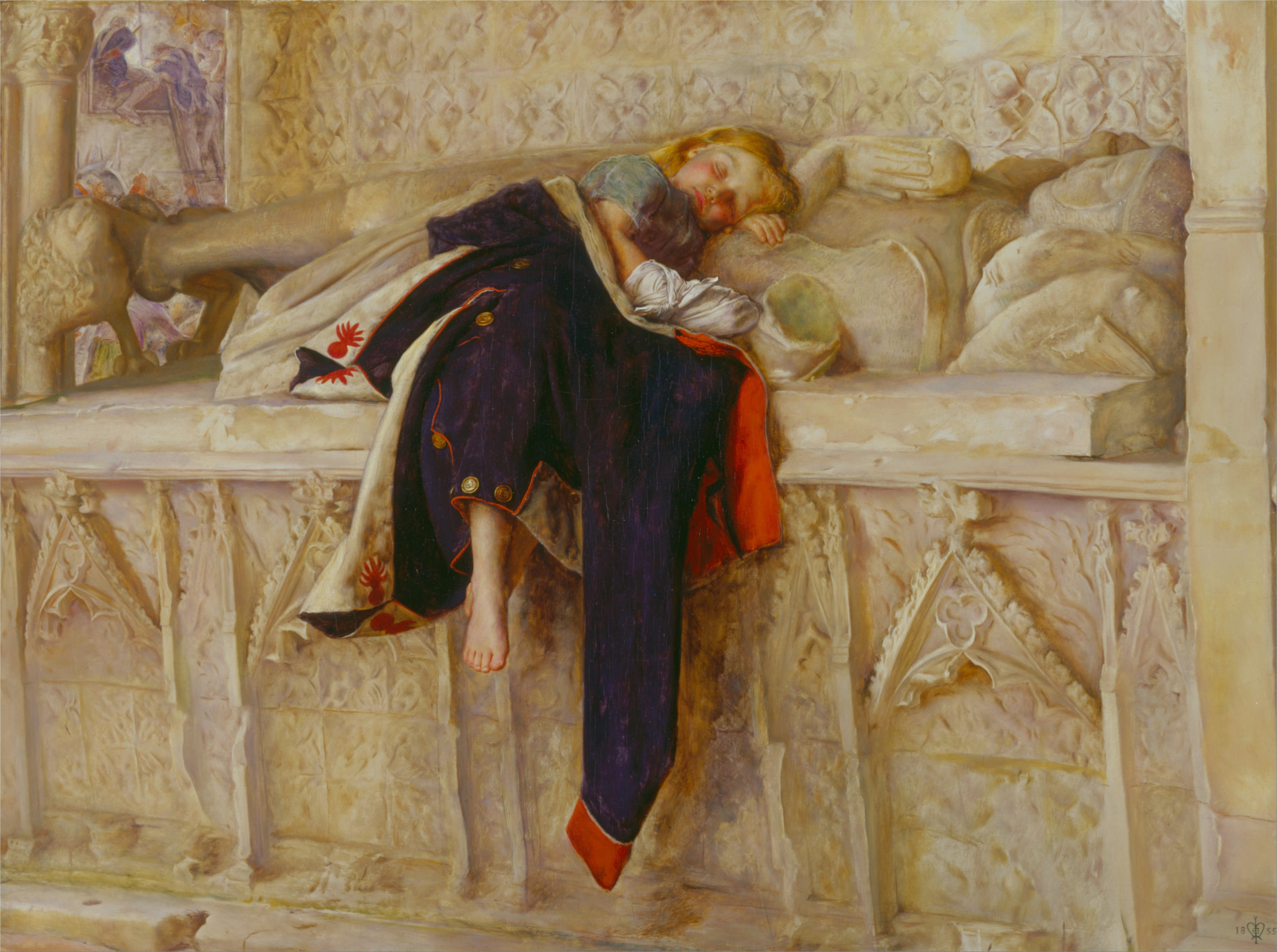
L'Enfant du Régiment by John Everett Millais

The Blind Girl by John Everett Millais

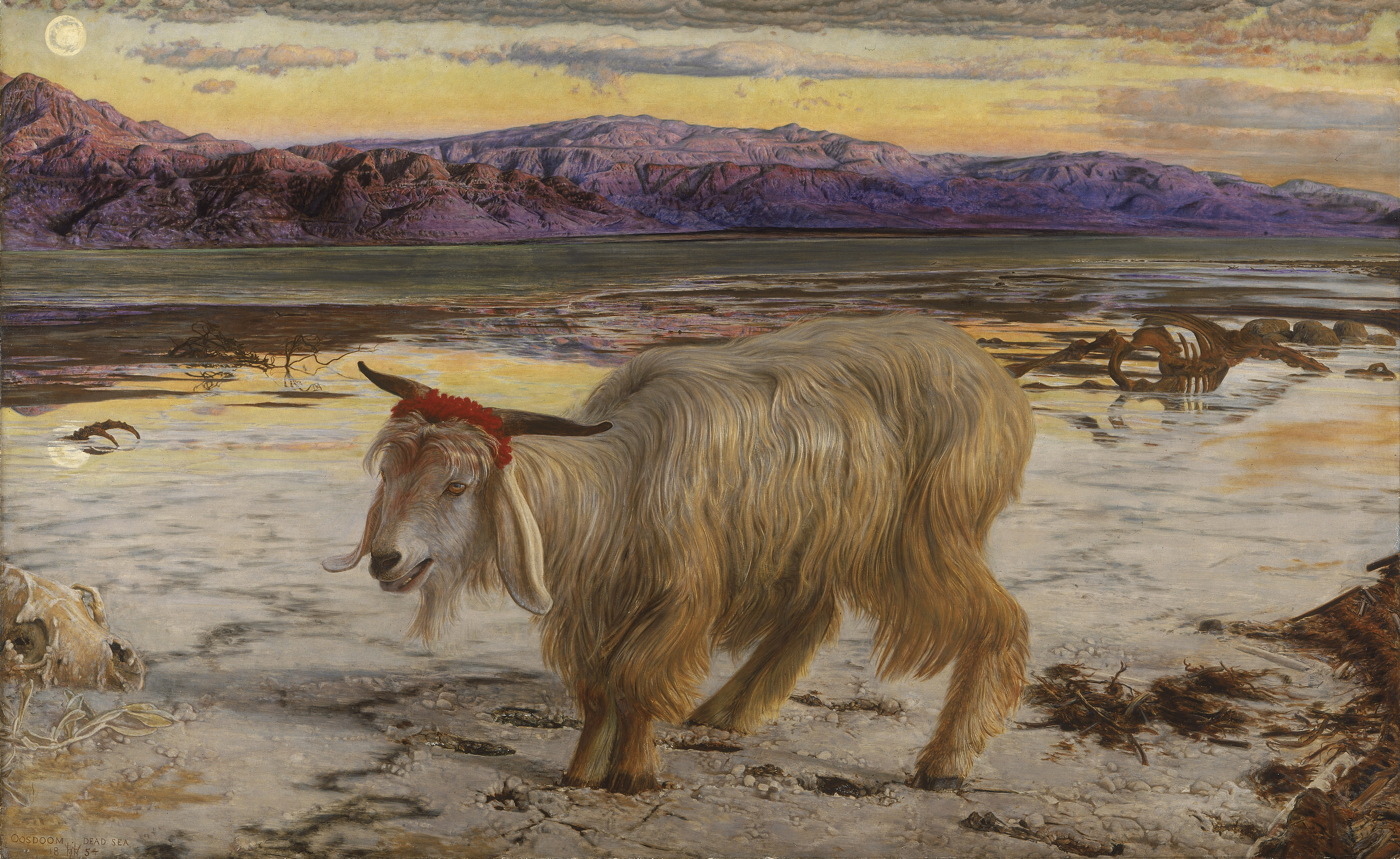
The Scapegoat by William Holman Hunt

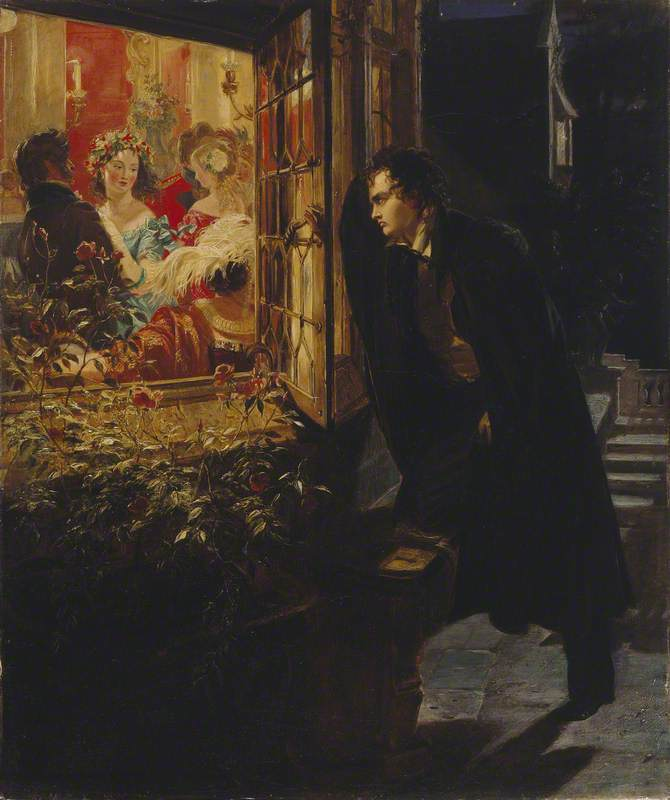
Byron's Early Love by Edward Matthew Ward

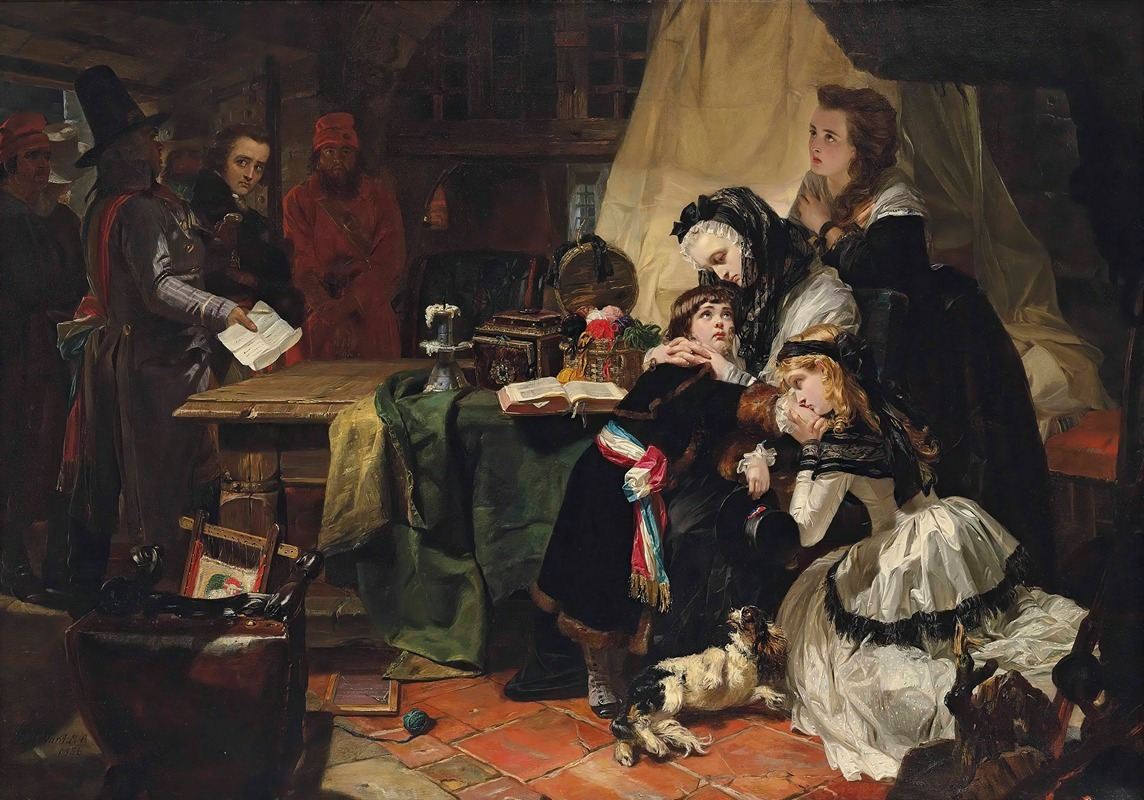
The Last Parting of Marie Antoinette and Her Son by Edward Matthew Ward

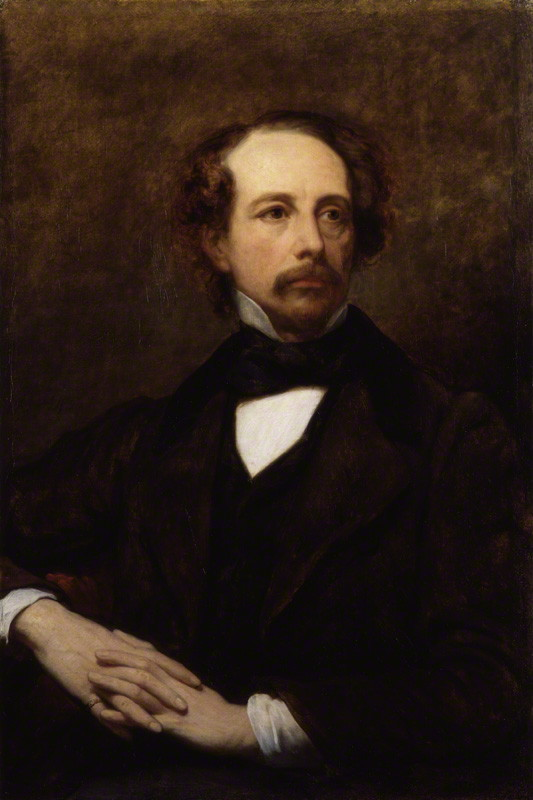
Portrait of Charles Dickens by Ary Scheffer

Rosalind and Celia by Henry Nelson O'Neil

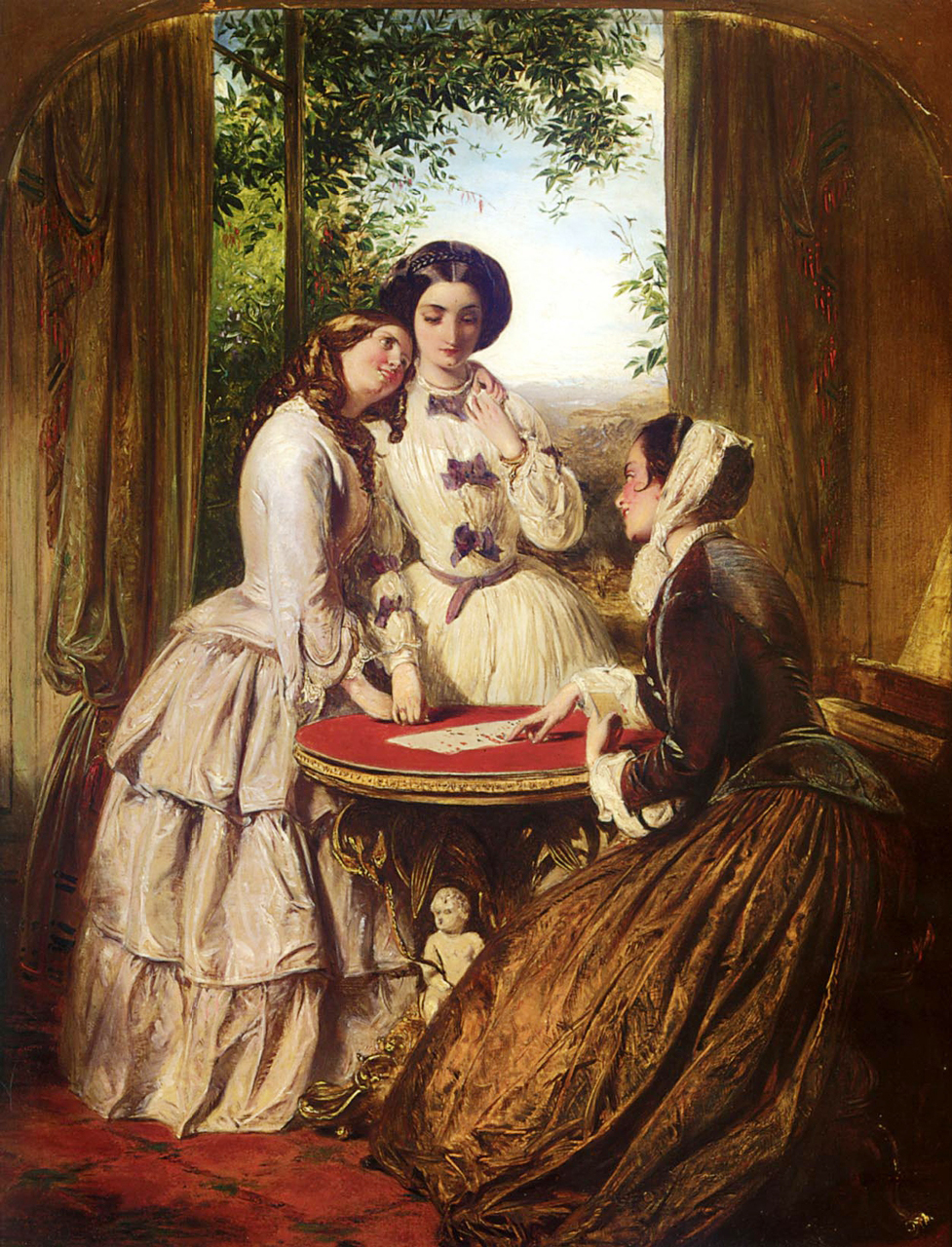
Doubtful Fortune by Abraham Solomon

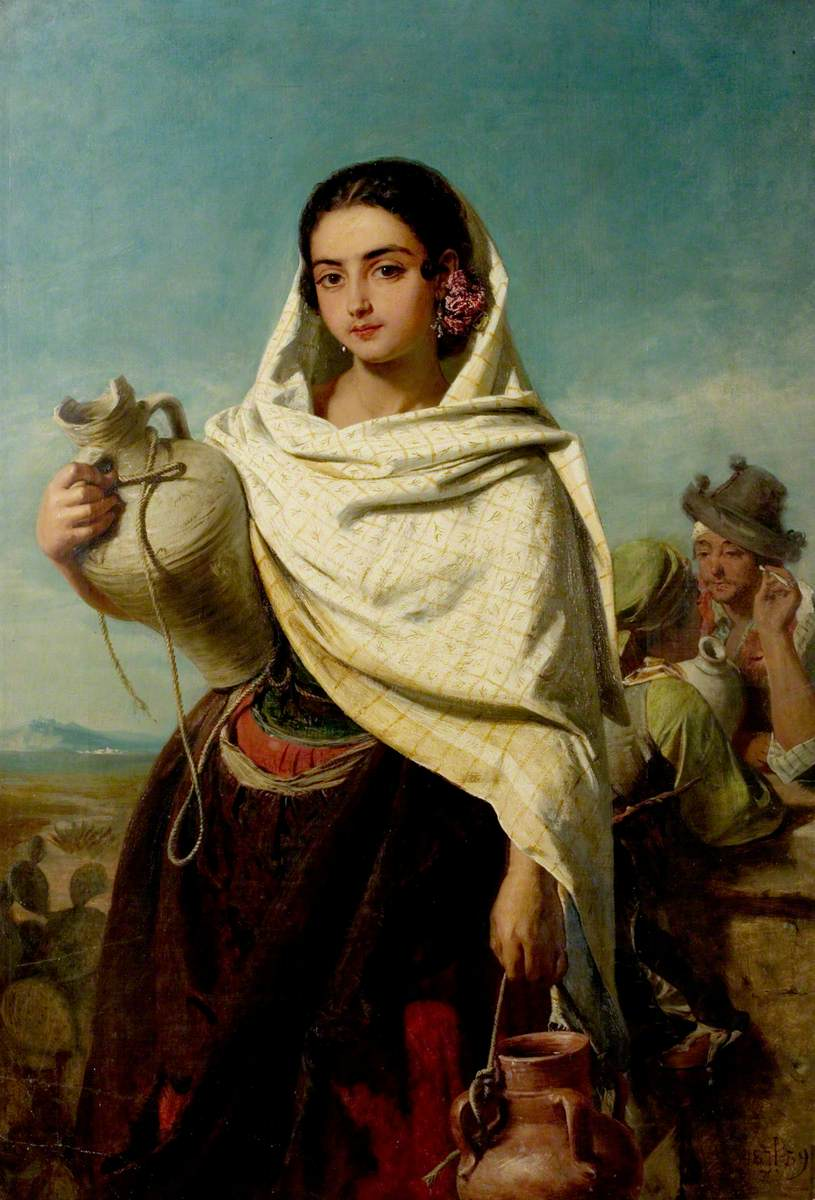
The Water-Carrier of Seville by John Phillip

Agua Fresca by John Phillip

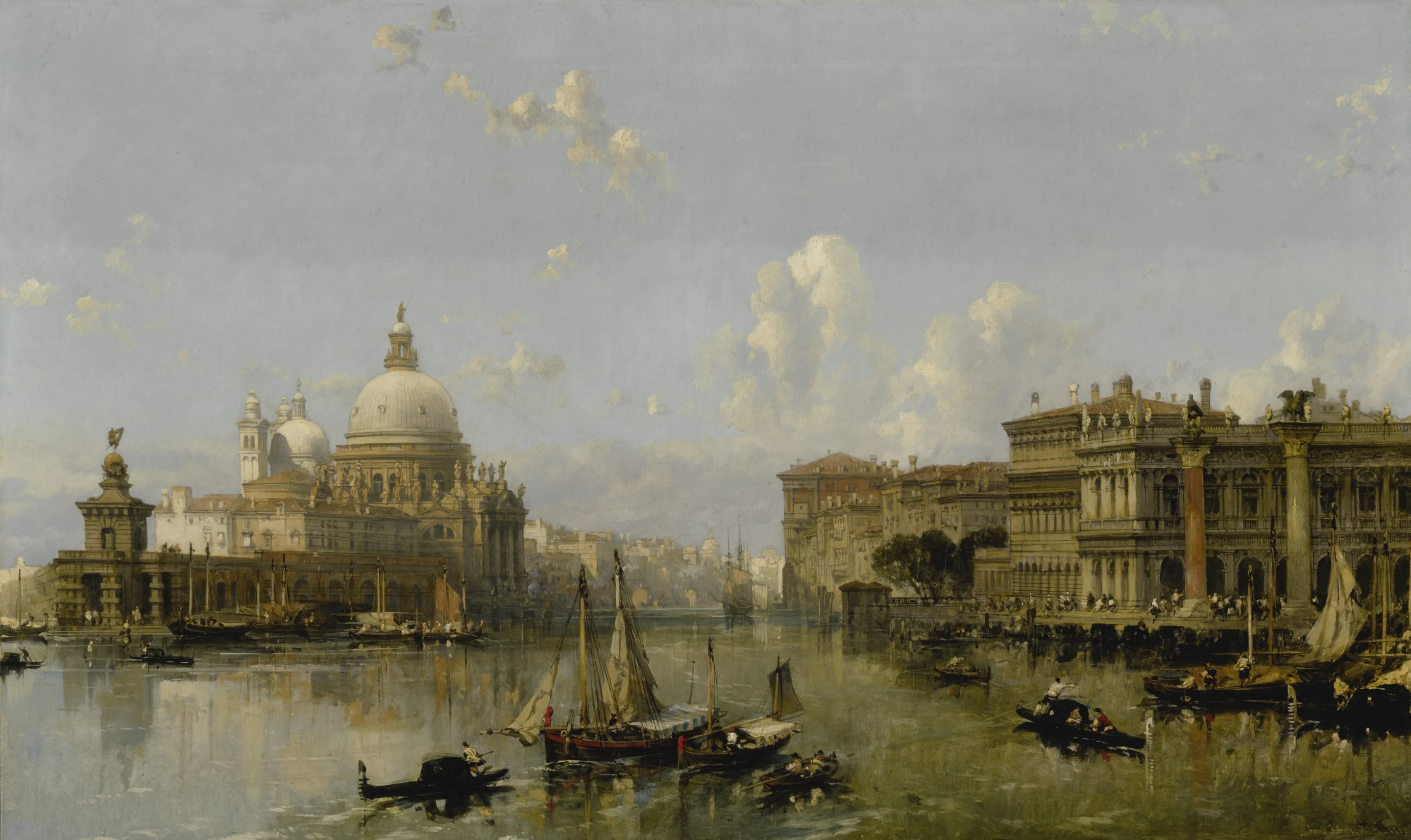
Venice, Approach to the Grand Canal by David Roberts

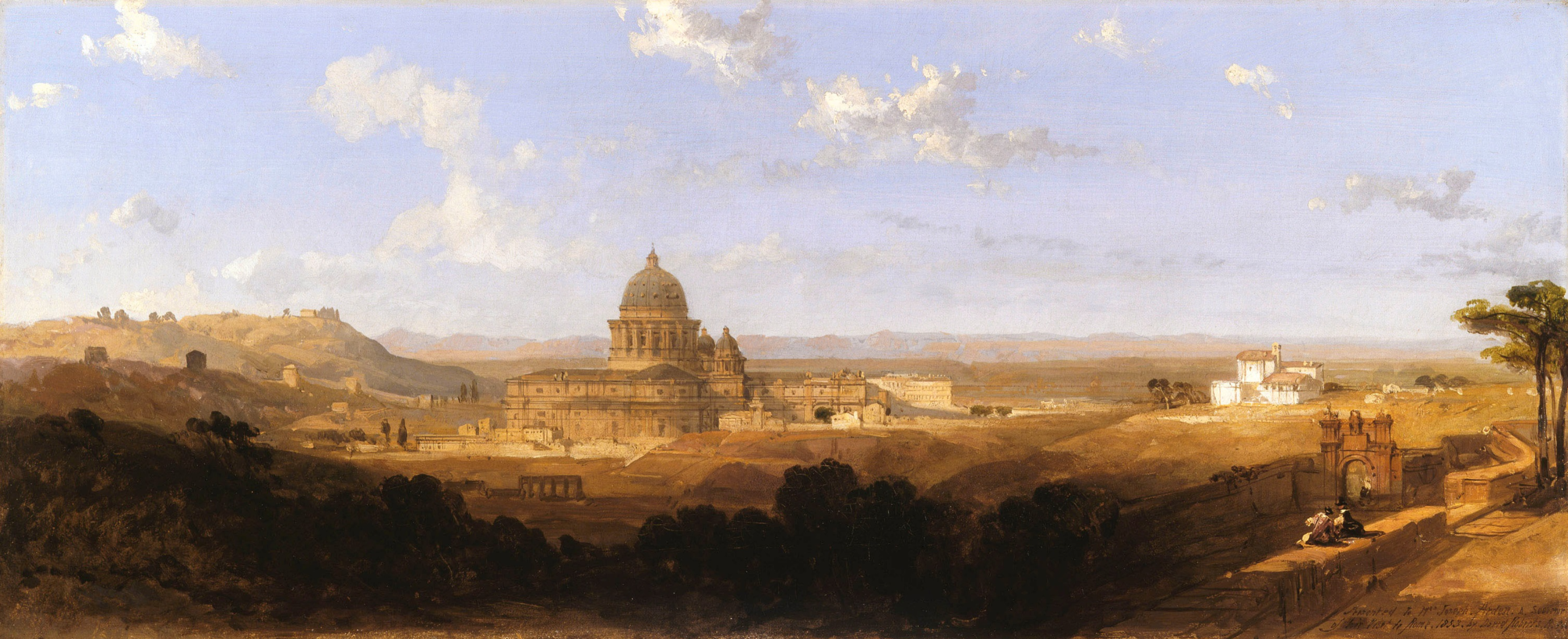
Looking Back on Rome by David Roberts

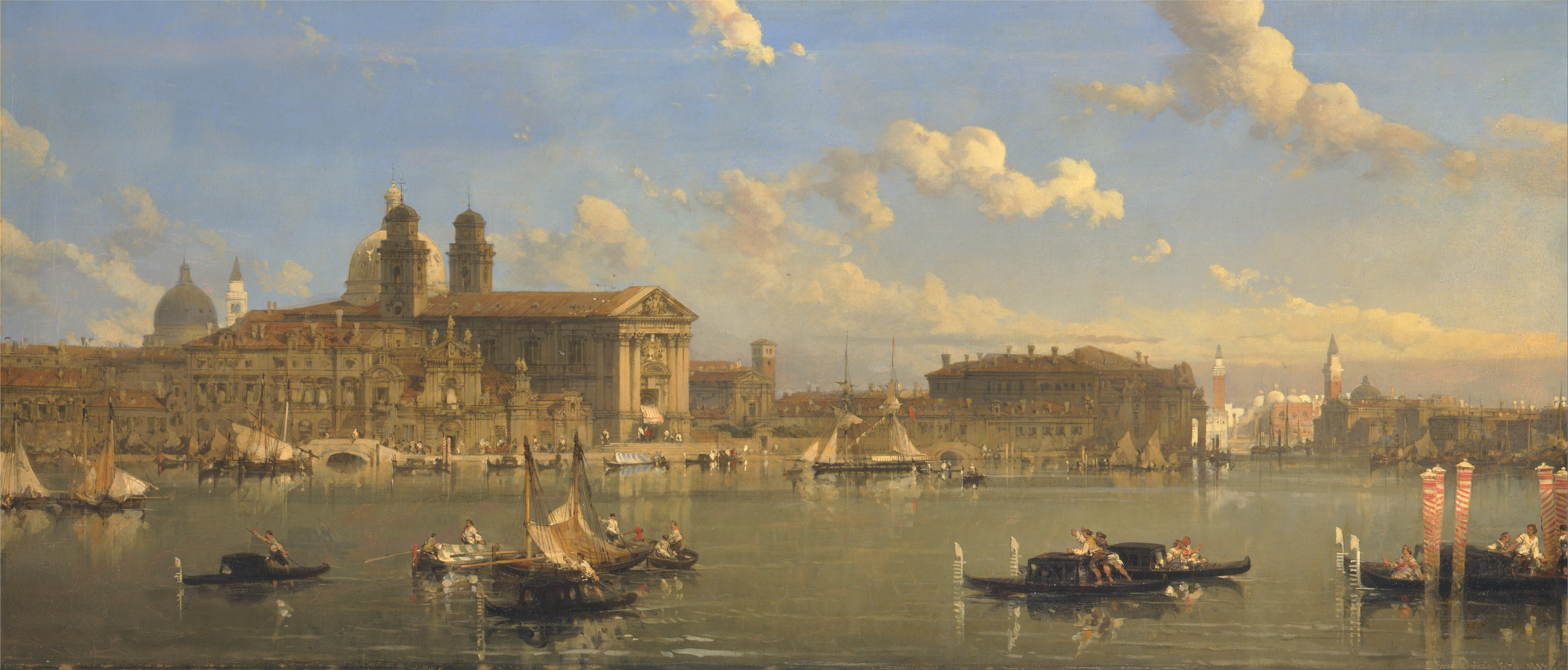
The Giudecca, Venice by David Roberts

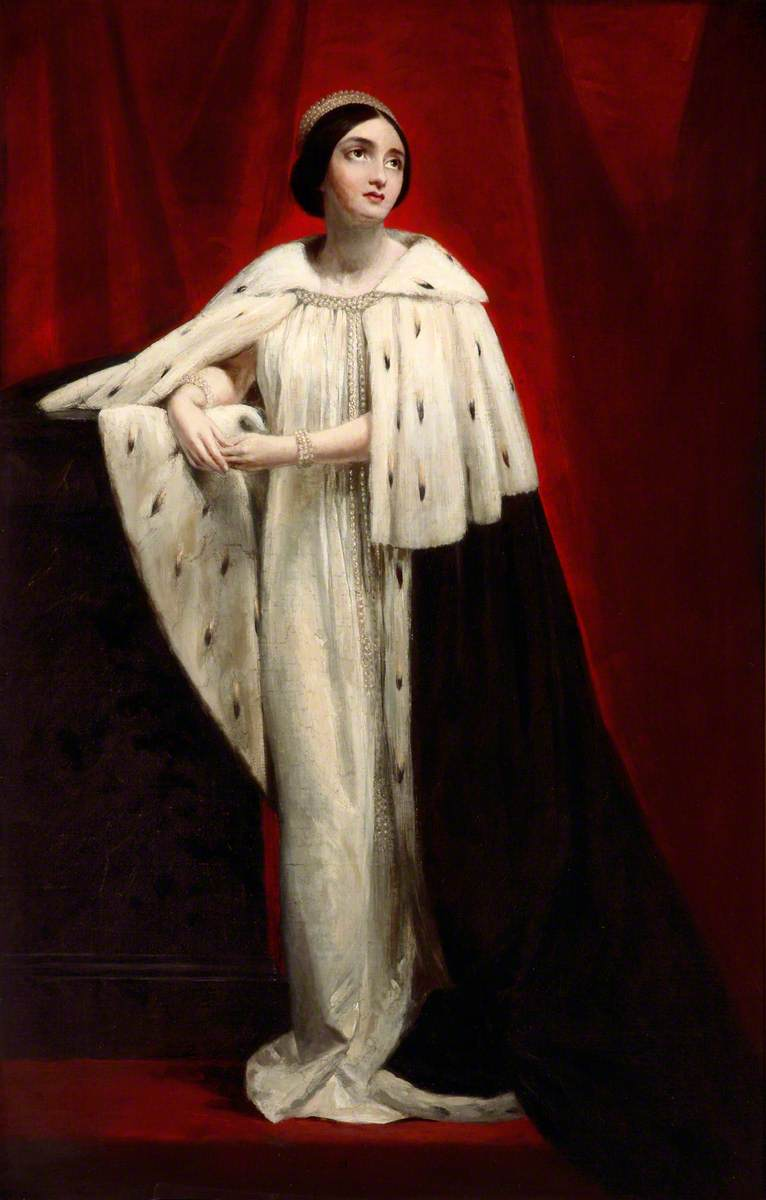
Hermione by Charles Robert Leslie

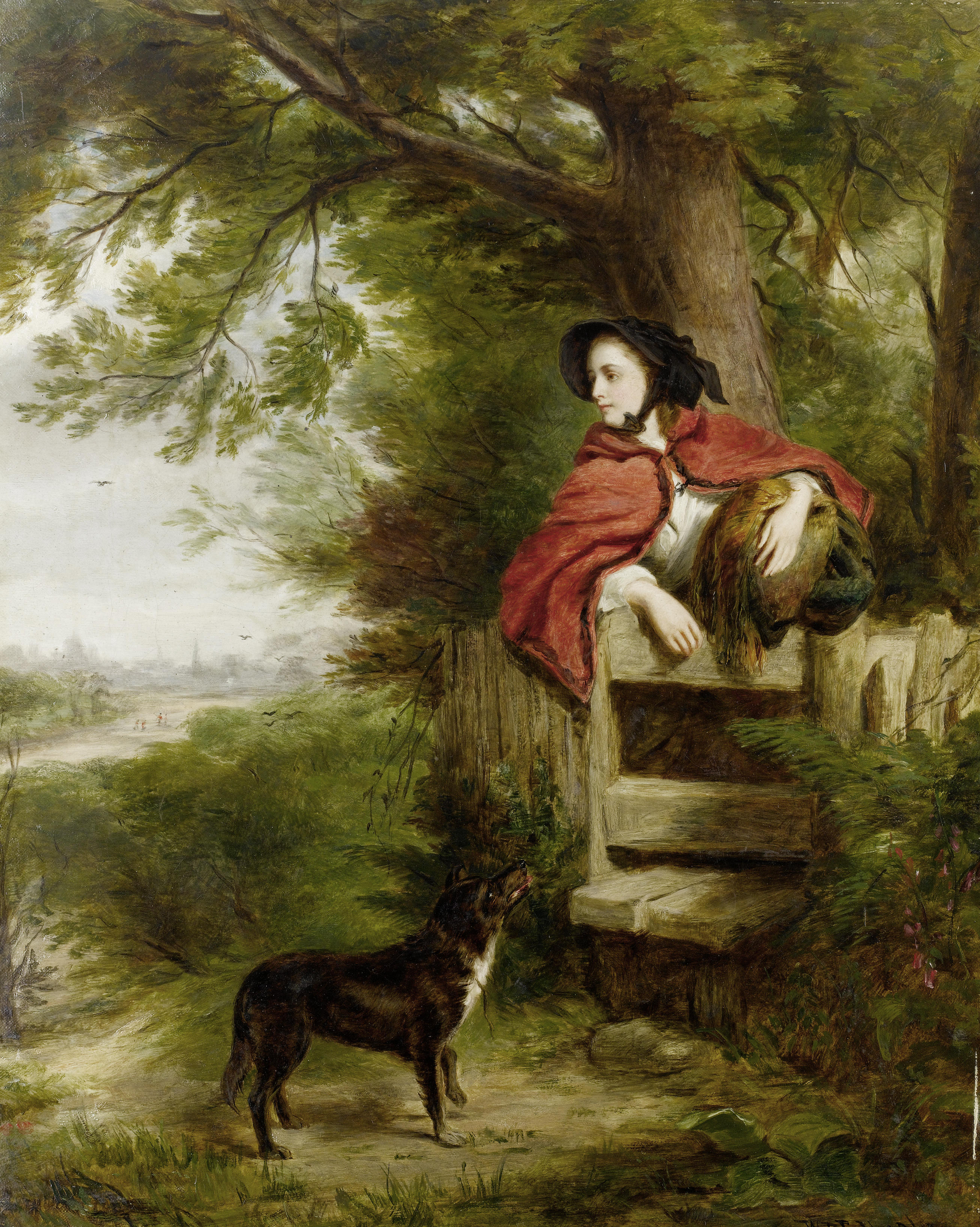
A Dream of the Future by William Powell Frith

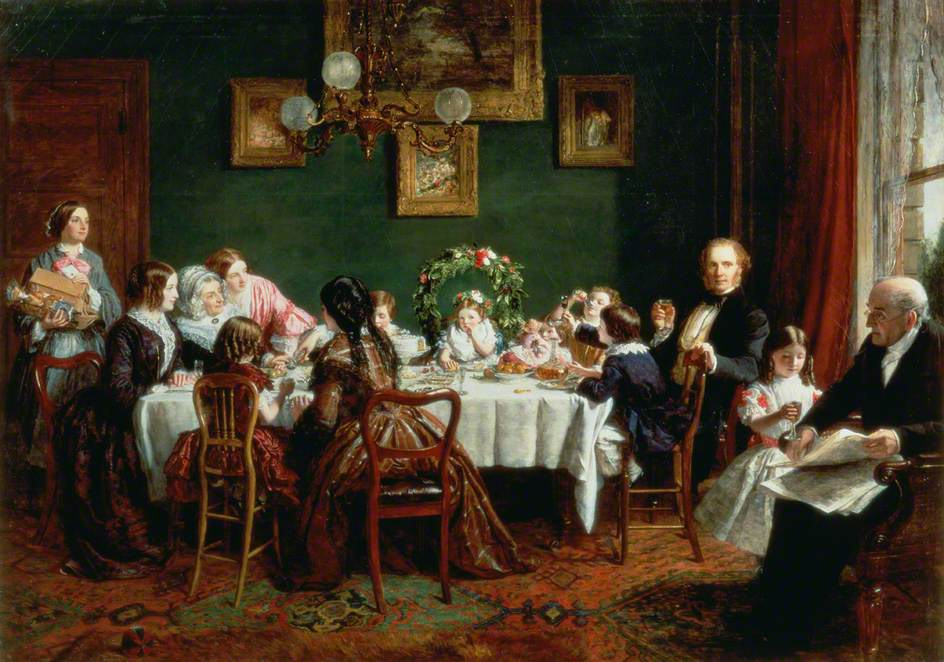
Many Happy Returns of the Day by William Powell Frith

Garden Flowers by William Powell Frith

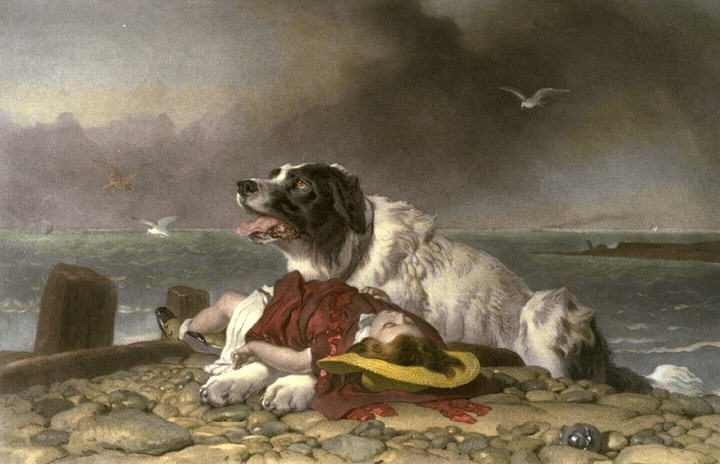
Saved! by Edwin Landseer

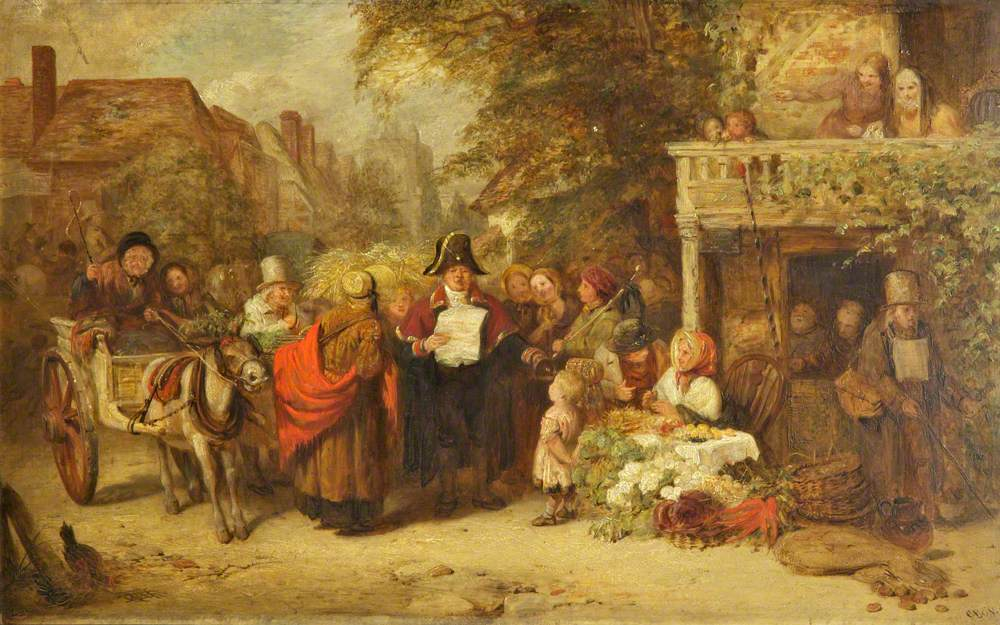
Market Day by George Bernard O'Neill

The Captured Runaway by William Gale

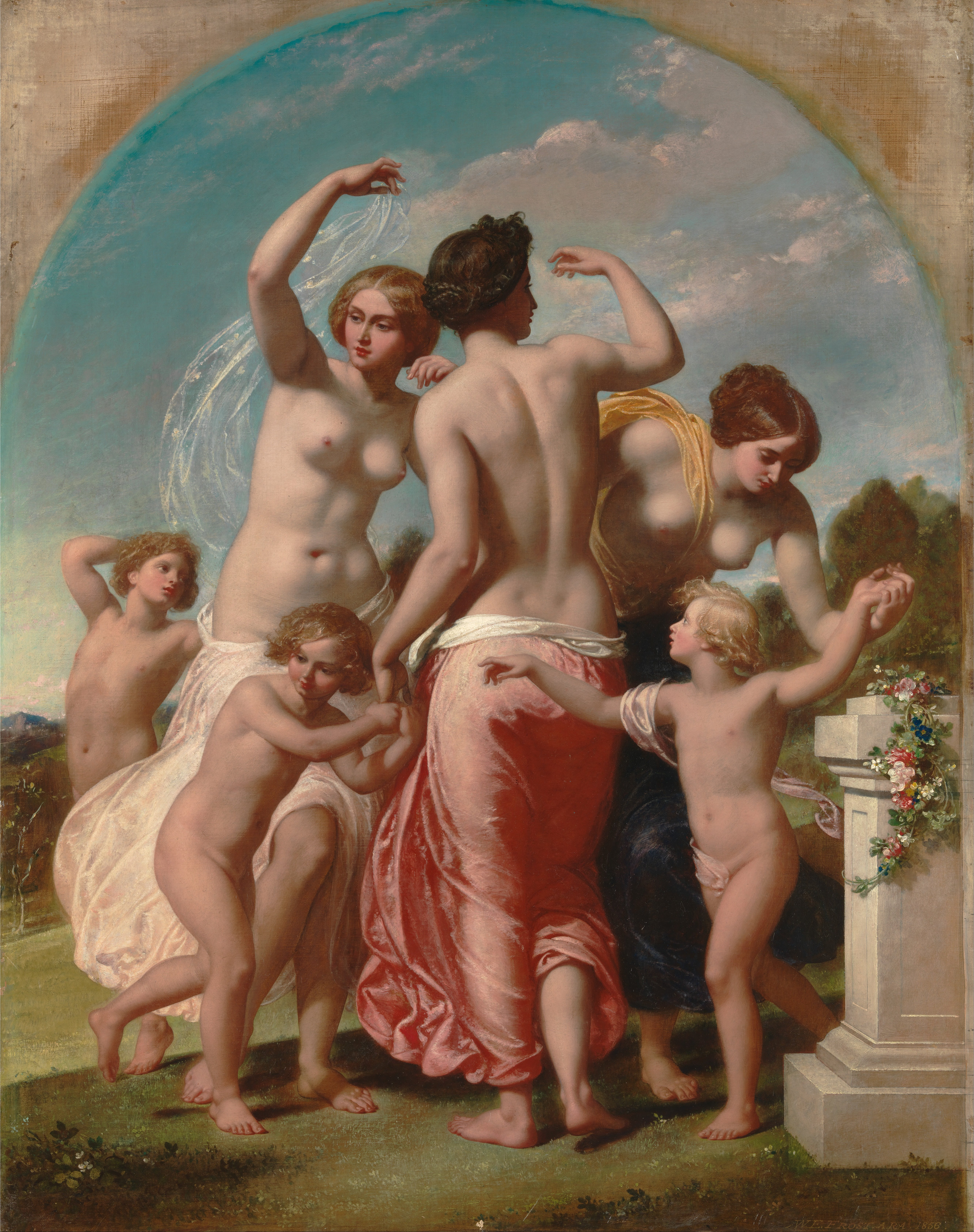
The Three Graces by William Edward Frost

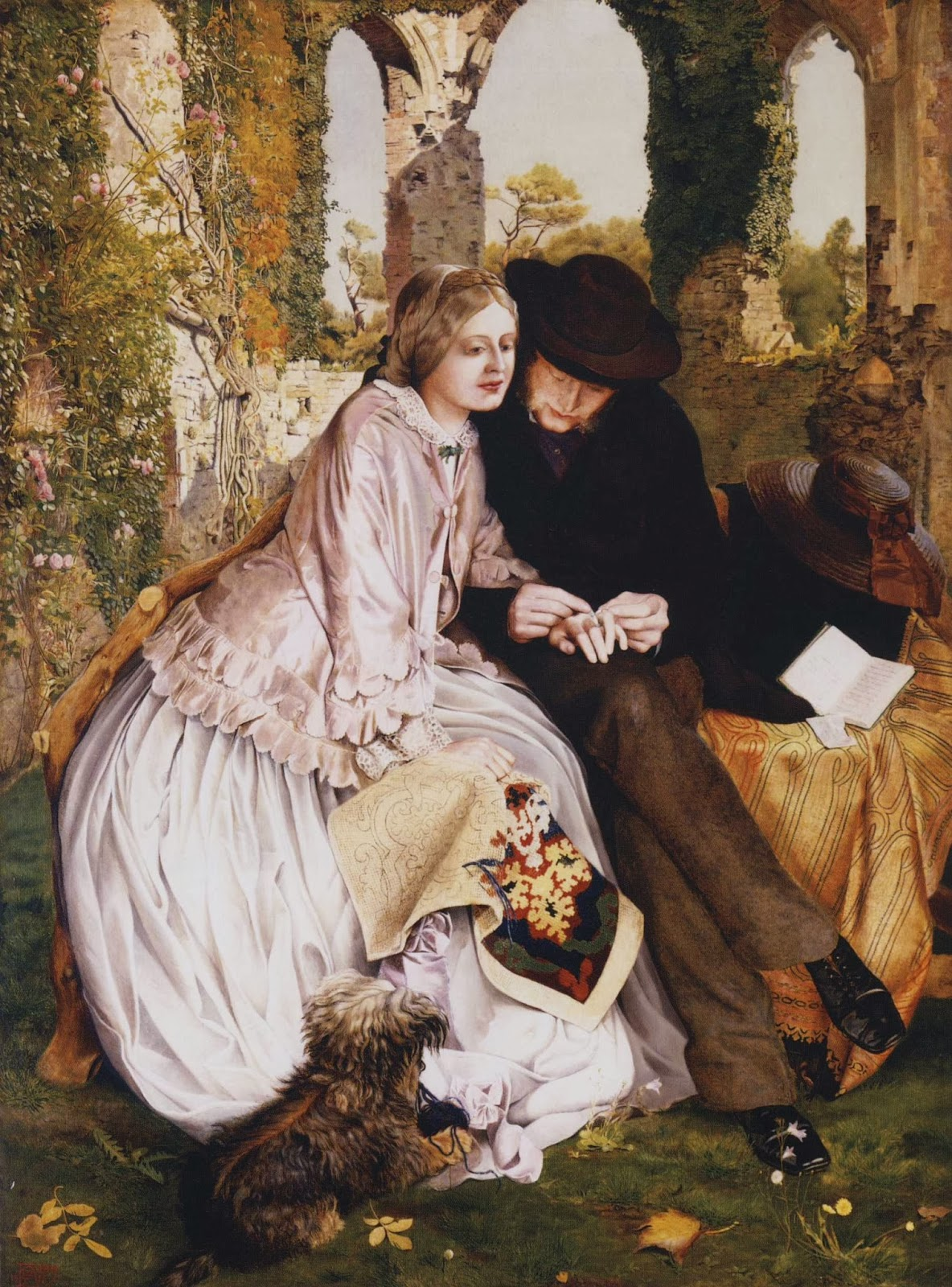
The Measure for the Wedding Ring by Michael Frederick Halliday

The Abandoned by Clarkson Stanfield, an engraving based on the painting

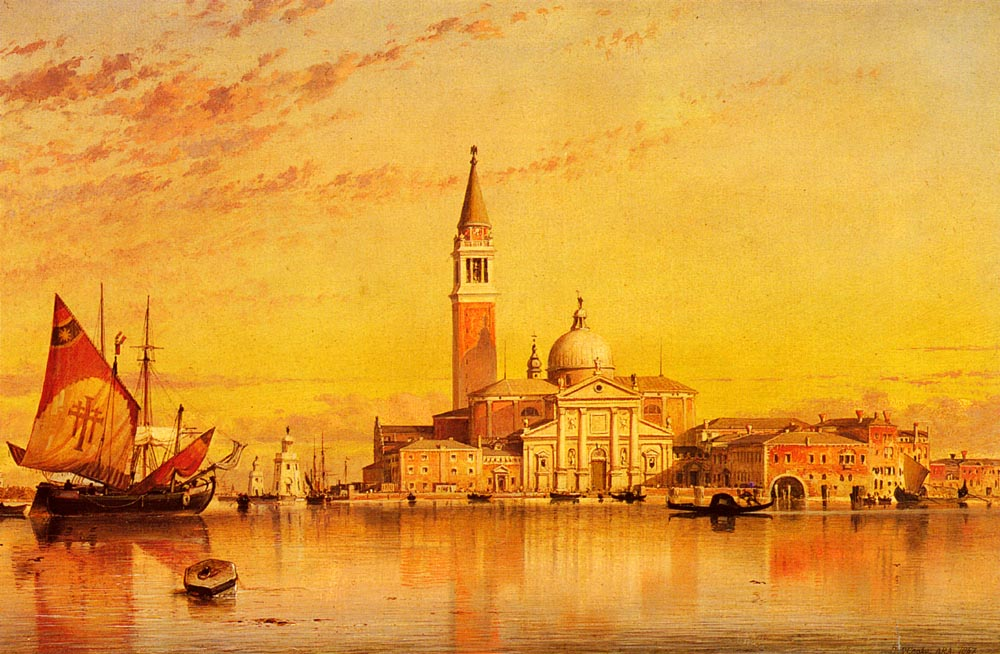
San Giorgio Maggiore, Venice by Edward William Cooke

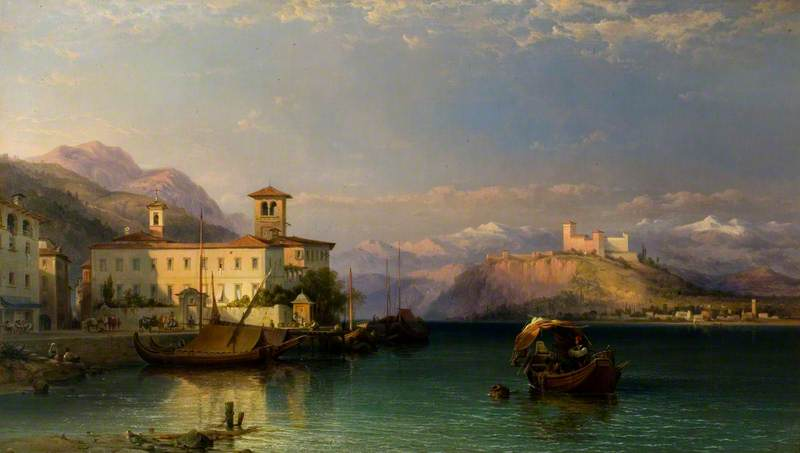
Arona and the Castle of Angera, Lago Maggiore by George Edwards Hering

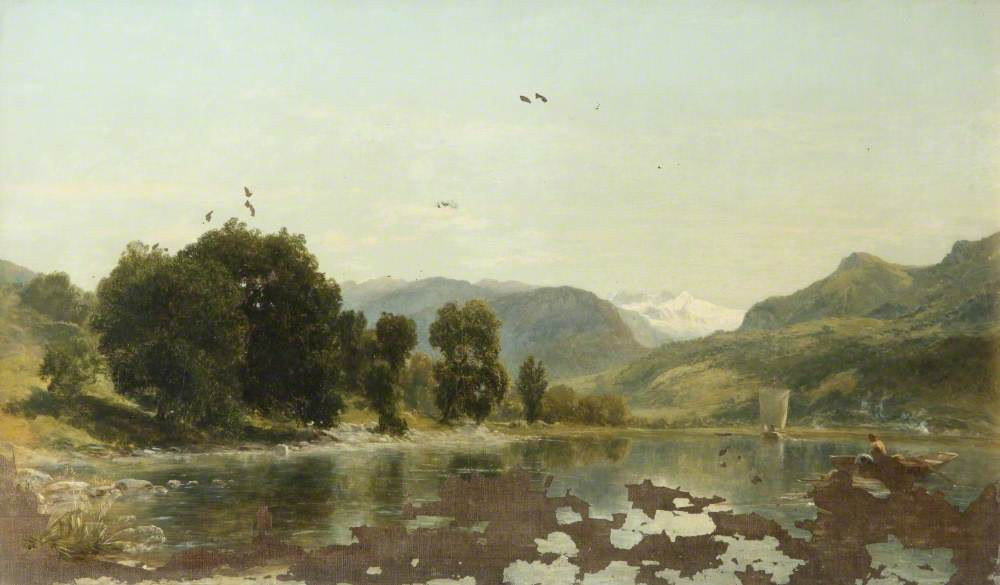
The Lake of Lucerne by Thomas Danby

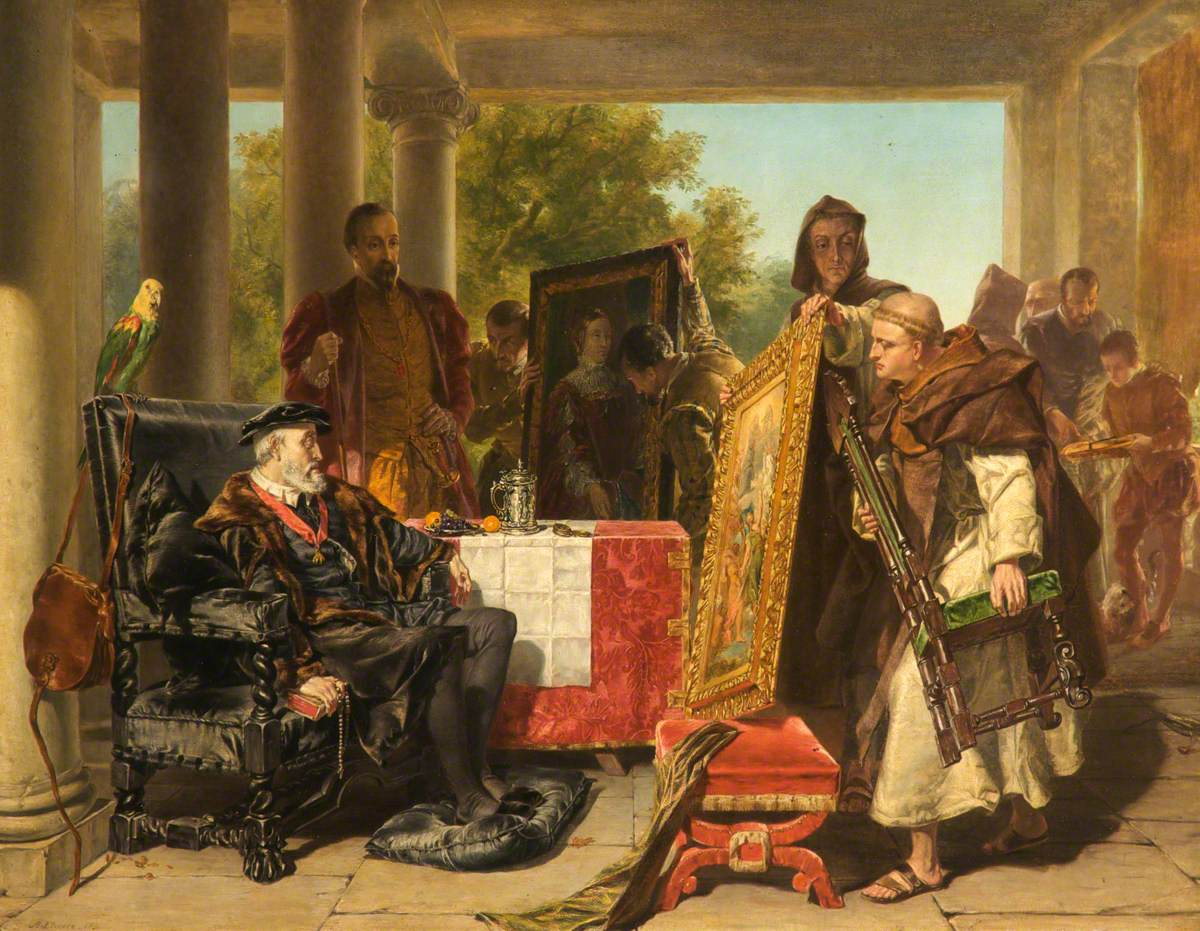
The Emperor Charles V at Yuste by Alfred Elmore

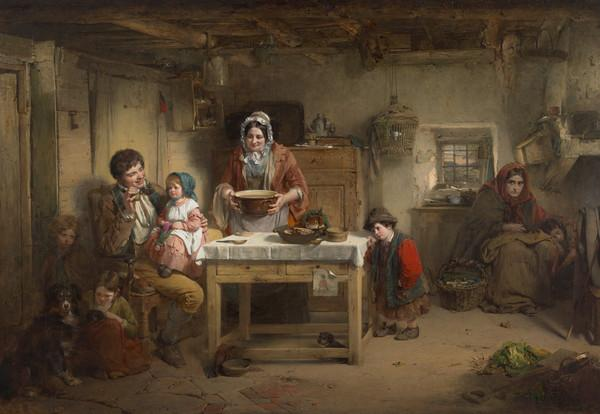
Home and the Homeless by Thomas Faed

Home Thoughts by Emily Mary Osborn

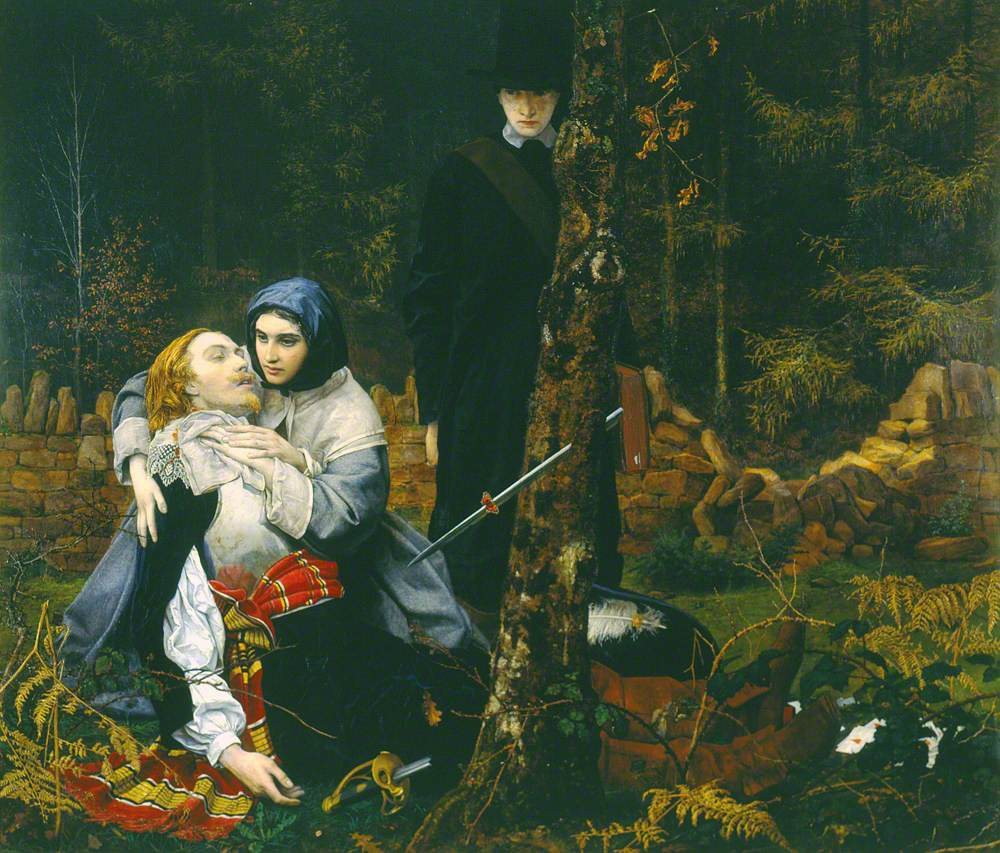
The Wounded Cavalier by William Shakespeare Burton

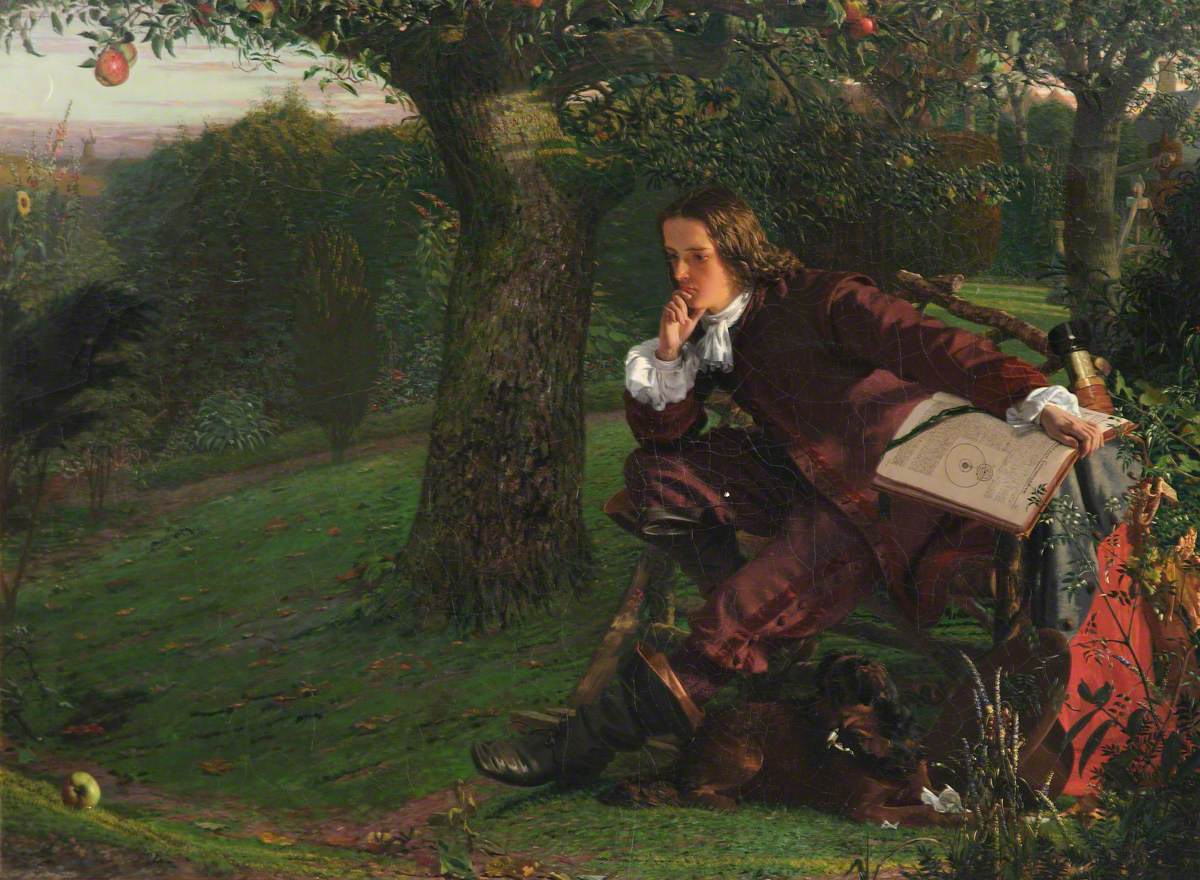
Isaac Newton in His Garden at Woolsthorpe by Robert Hannah

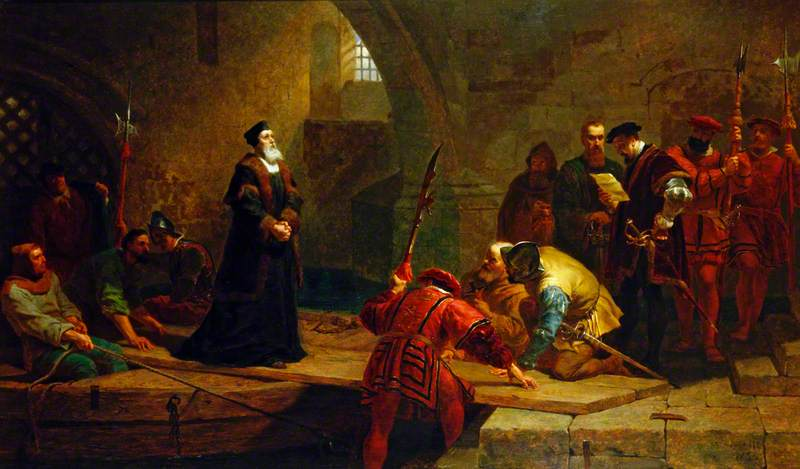
Cranmer at Traitor's Gate by Frederick Goodall

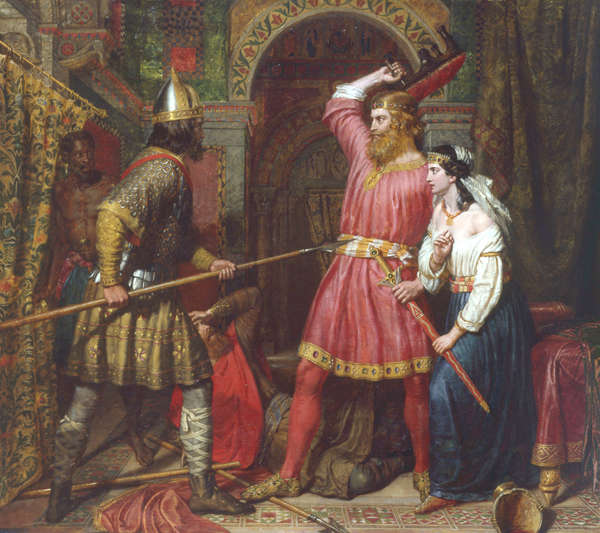
Assassination of Alboin, King of the Lombards by Charles Landseer

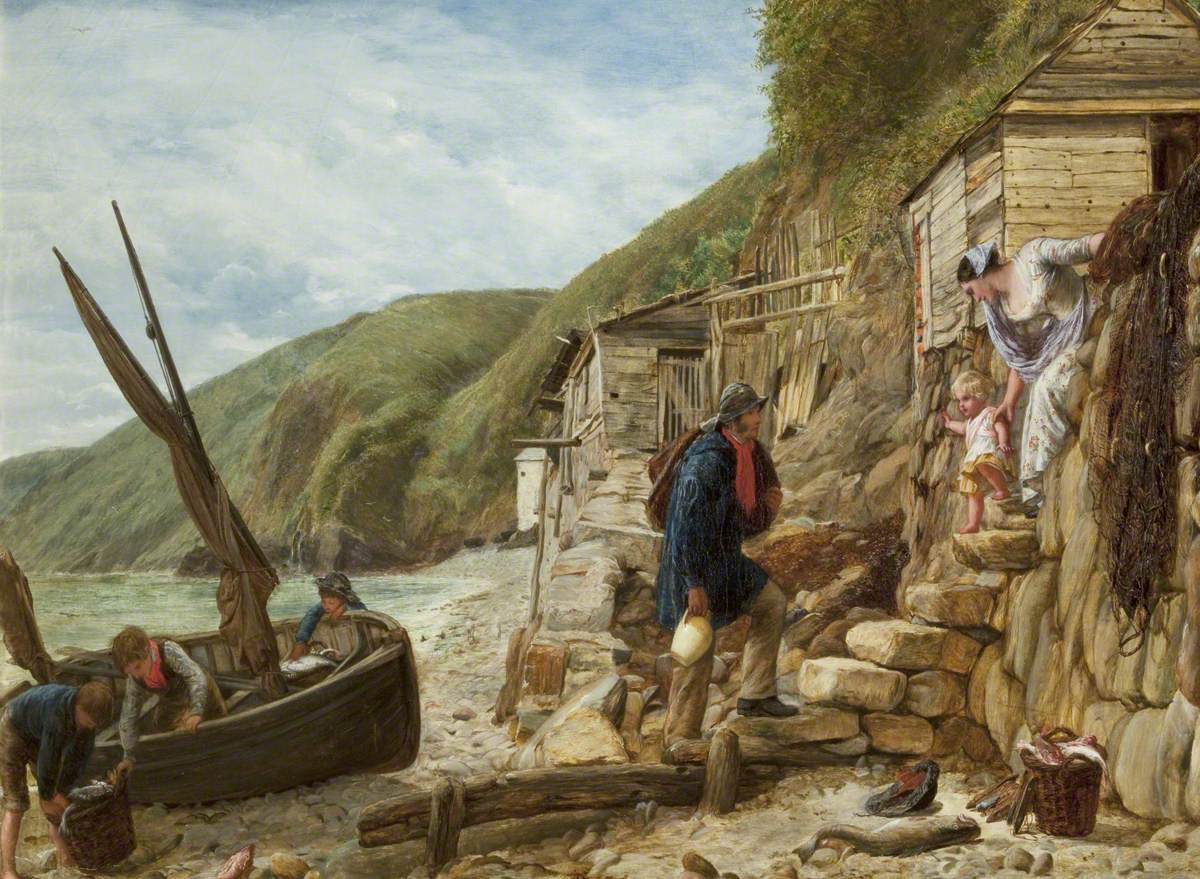
Welcome, Bonny Boat by James Clarke Hook

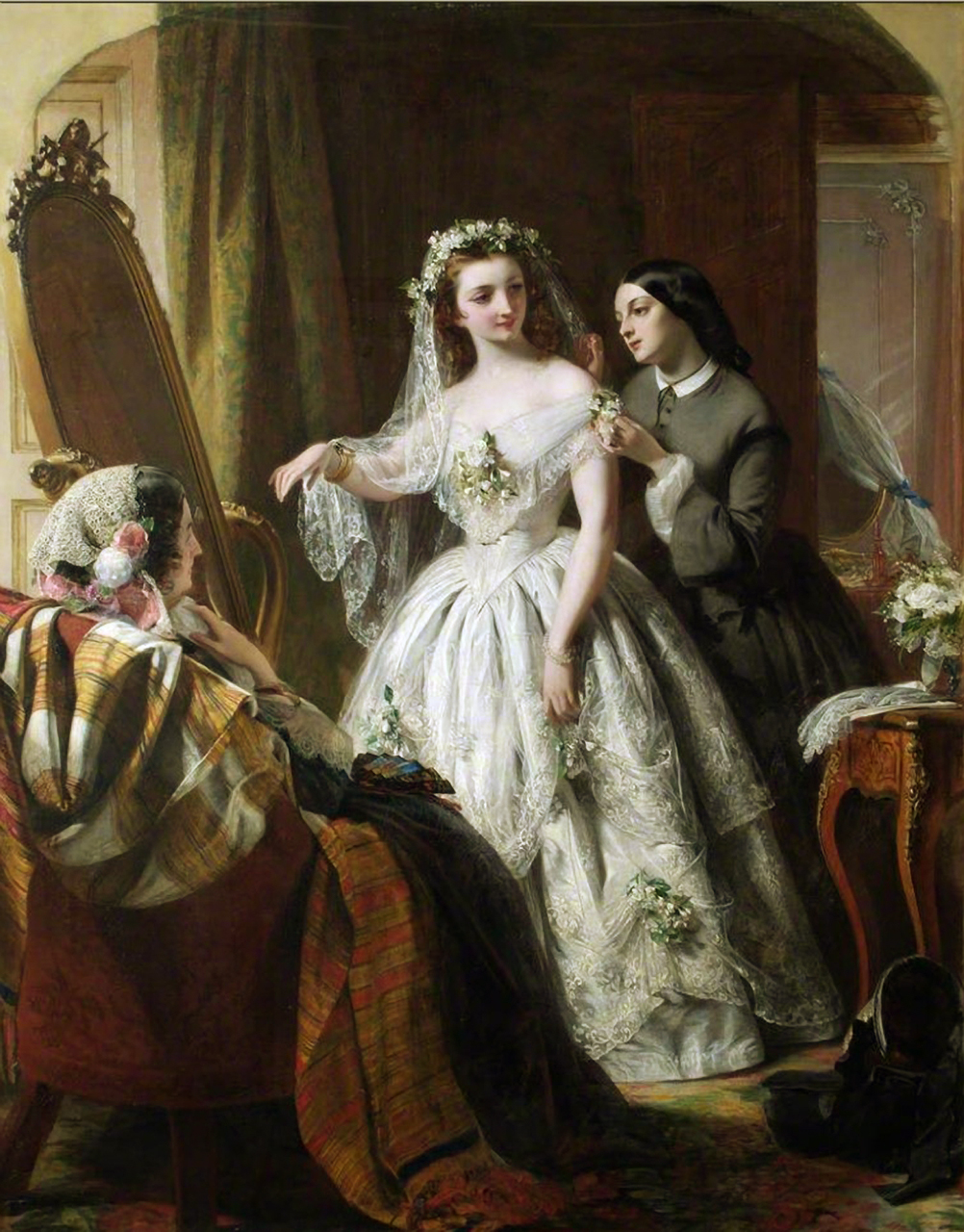
The Bride by Abraham Solomon

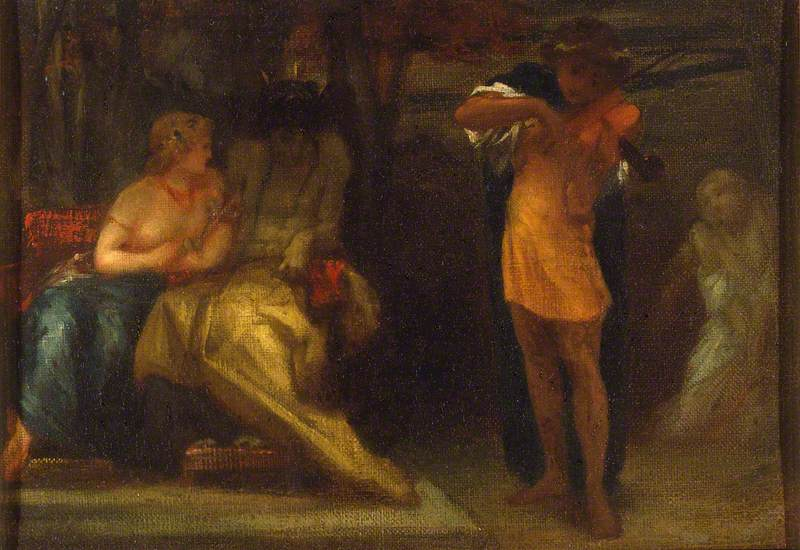
Sketch for The Triumph of Music by Frederic Leighton

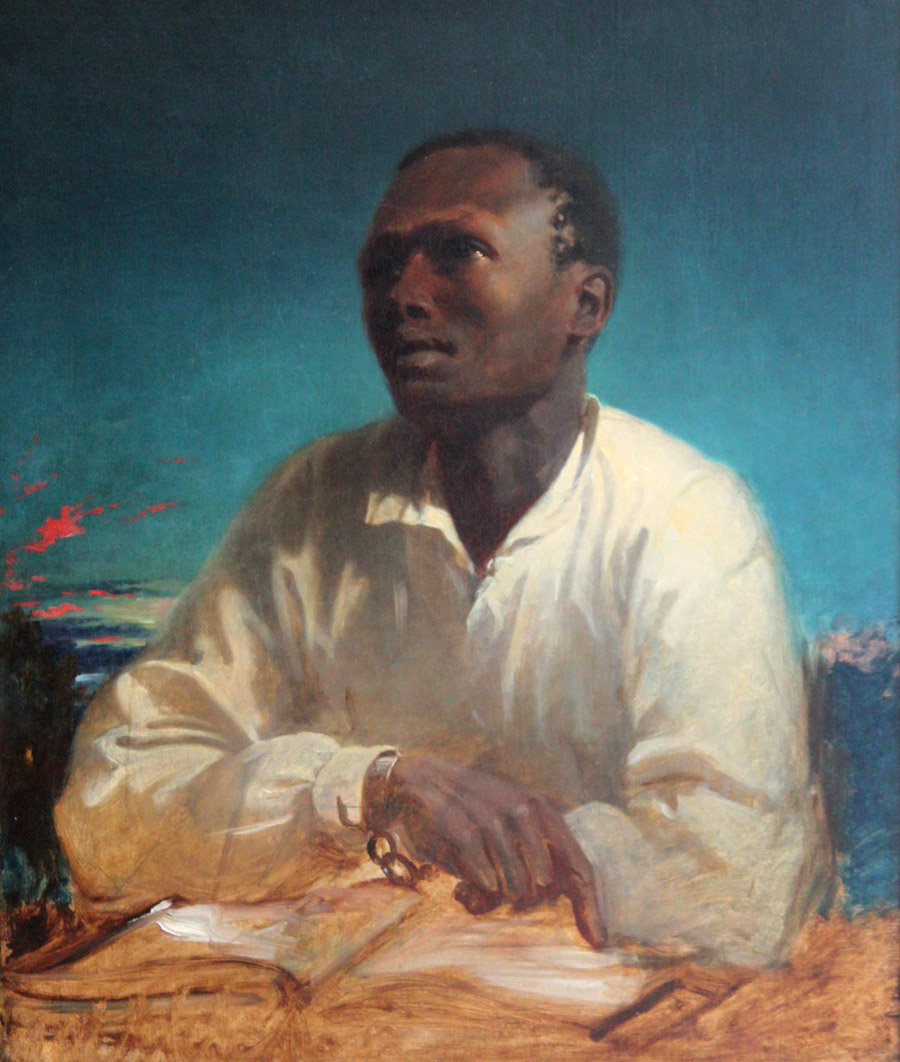
Uncle Tom by Thomas Uwins

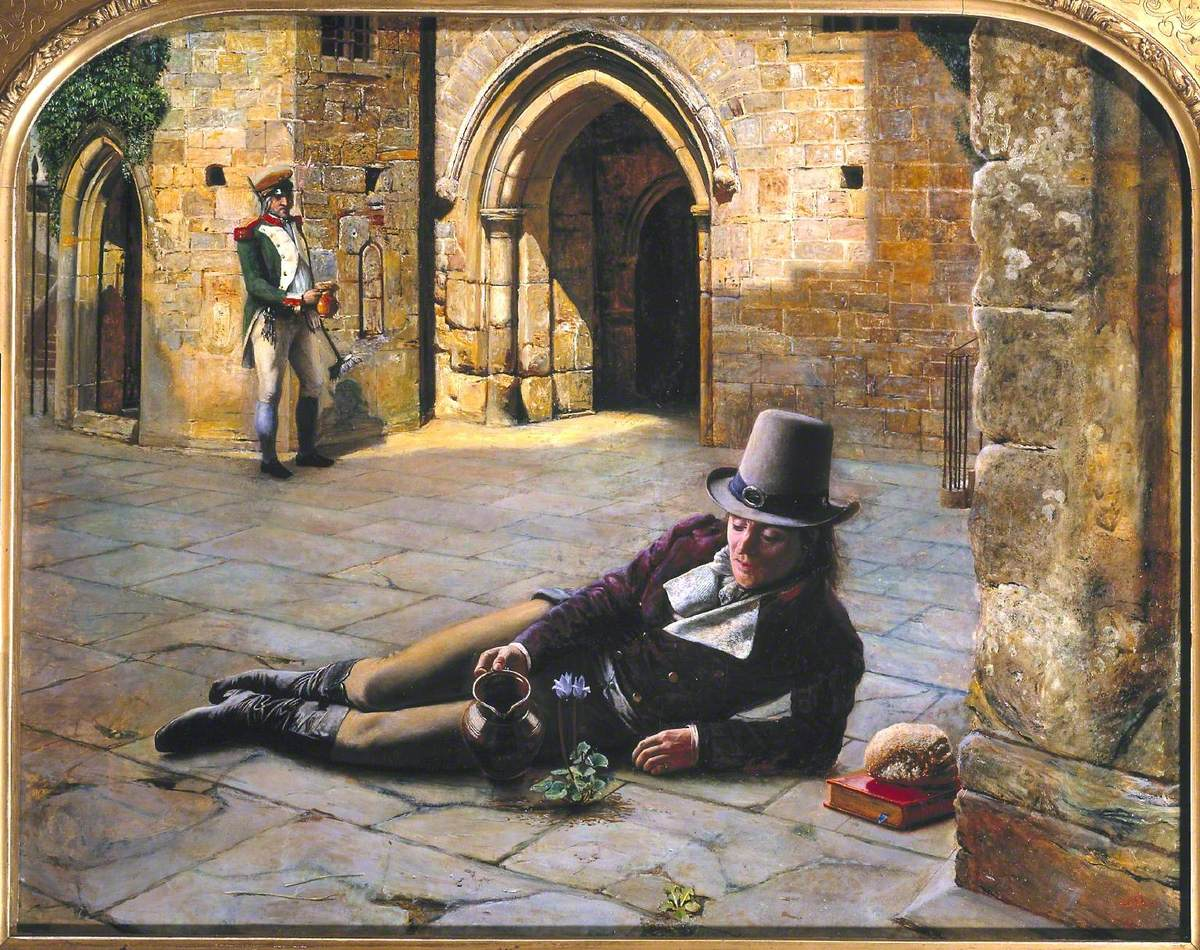
Picciola by Robert Braithwaite Martineau

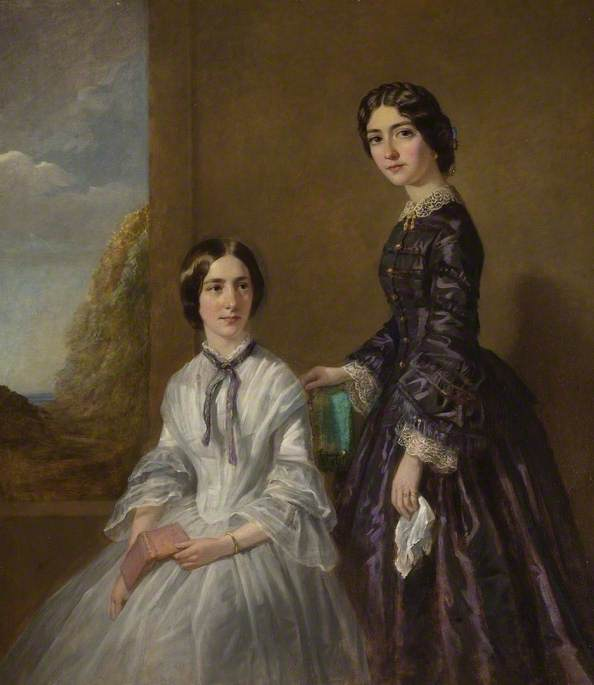
The Cousins by Edwin Long

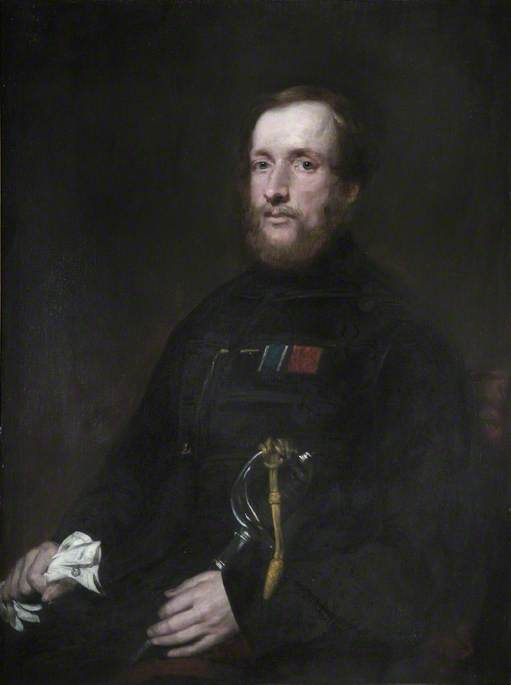
Edward Bruce Hamley by John Watson Gordon

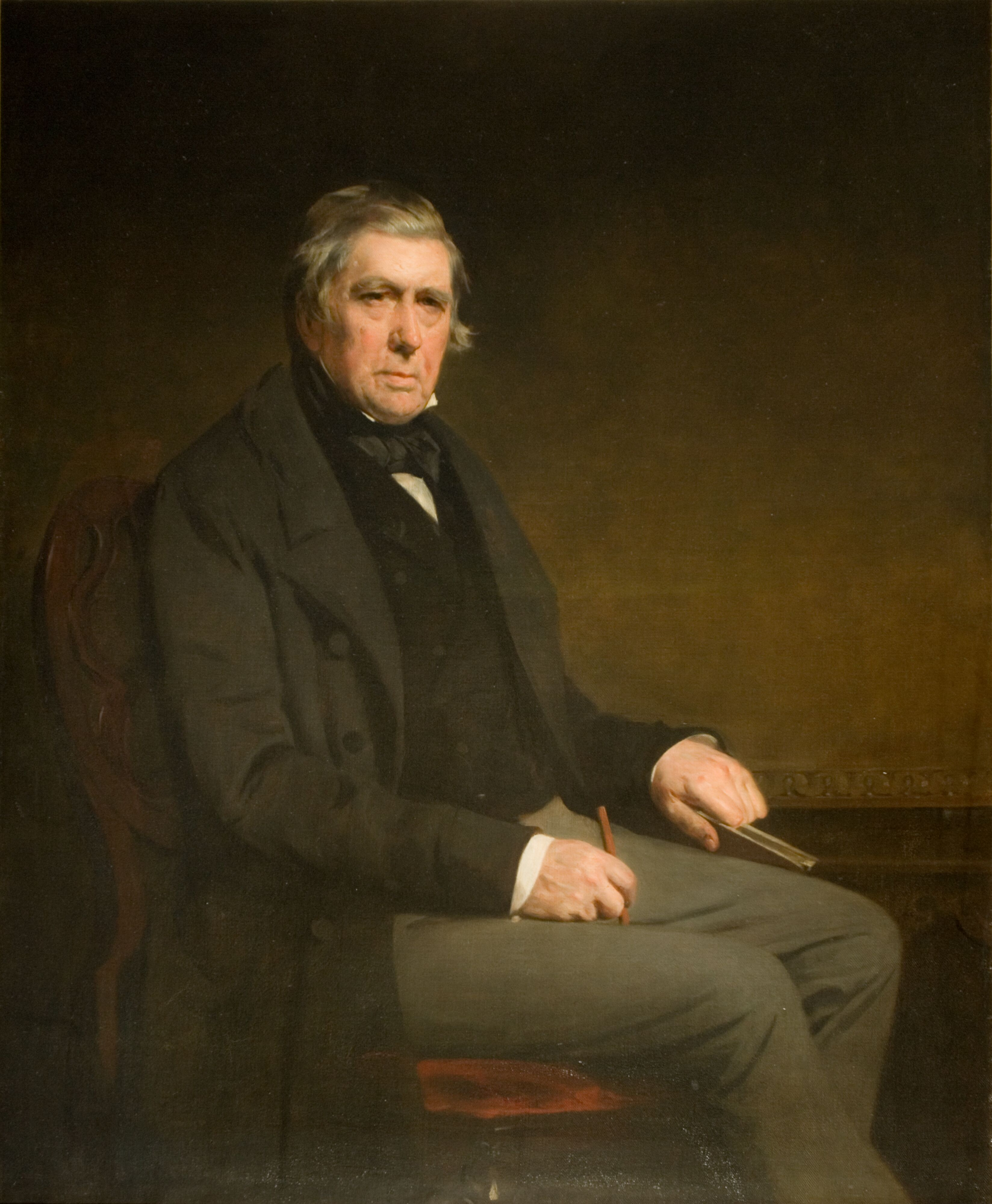
David Cox by John Watson Gordon

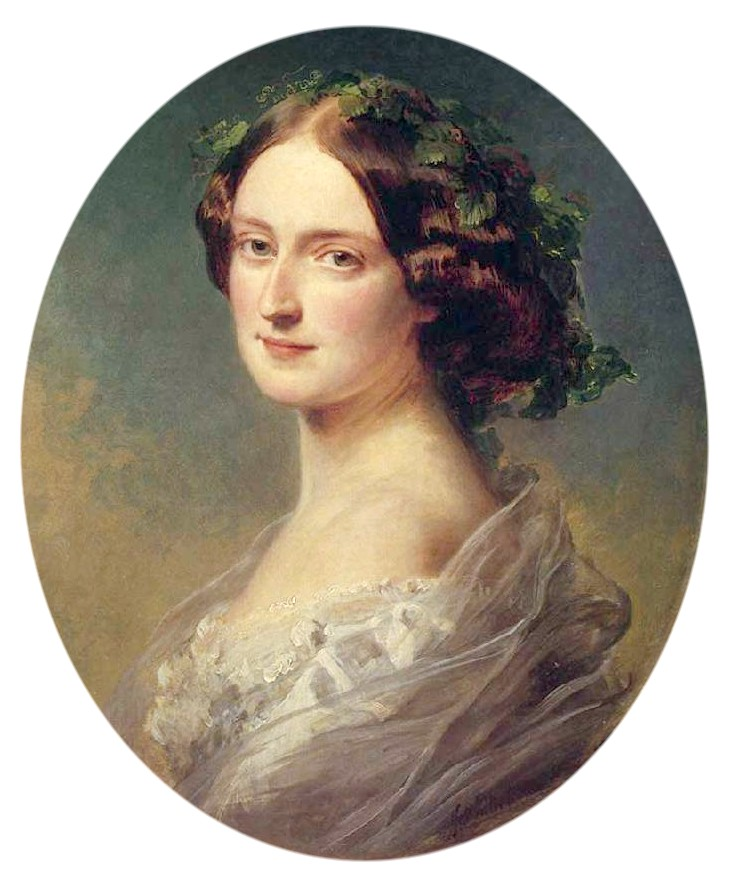
Lady Clementina Villiers by Franz Xaver Winterhalter

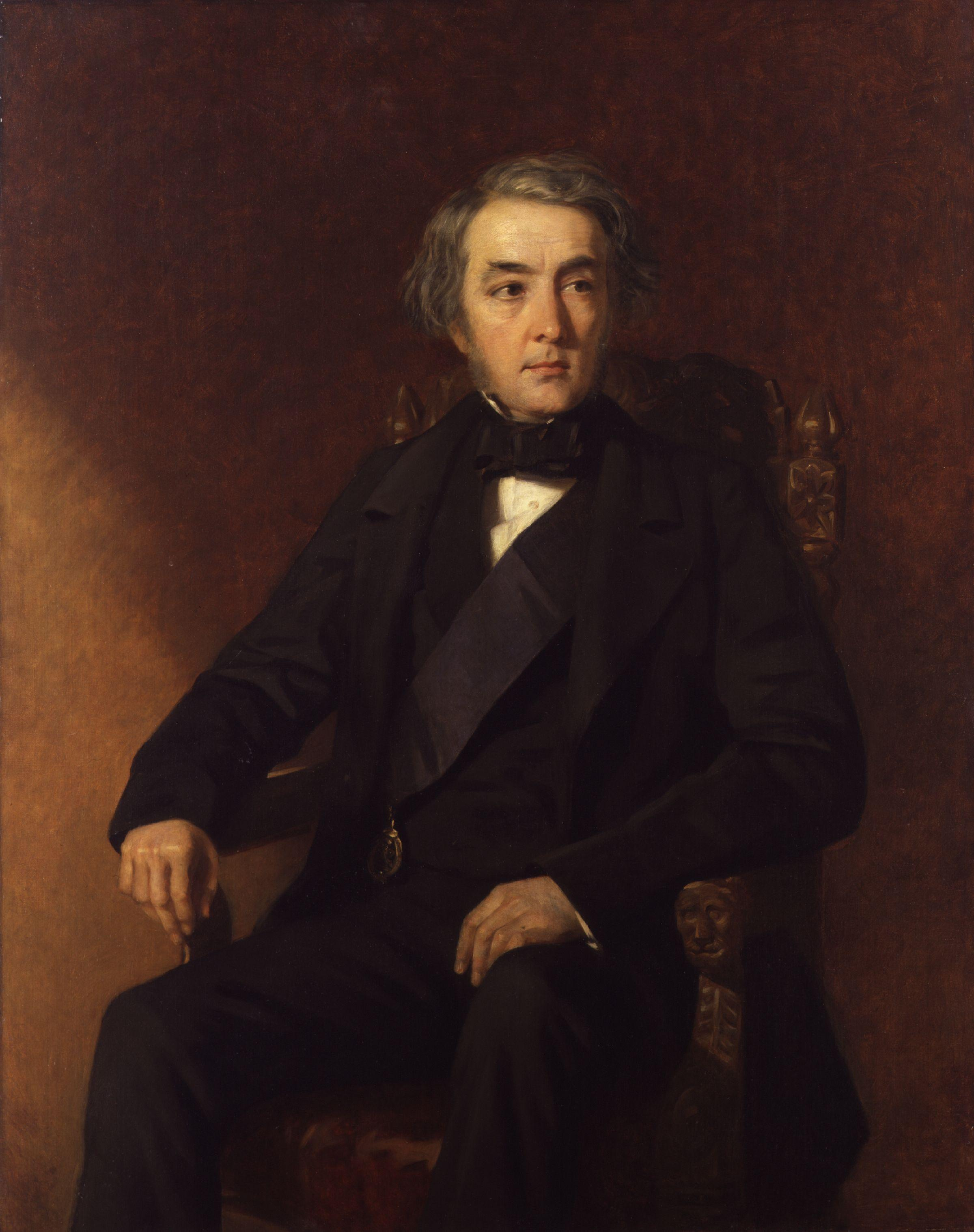
Earl of Ellesmere by Edwin Long

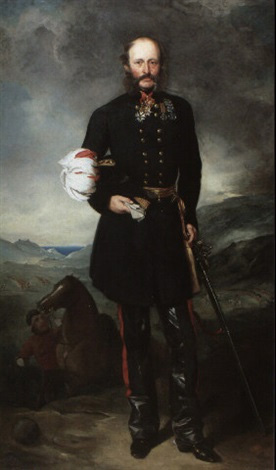
Lord Lucan by Francis Grant

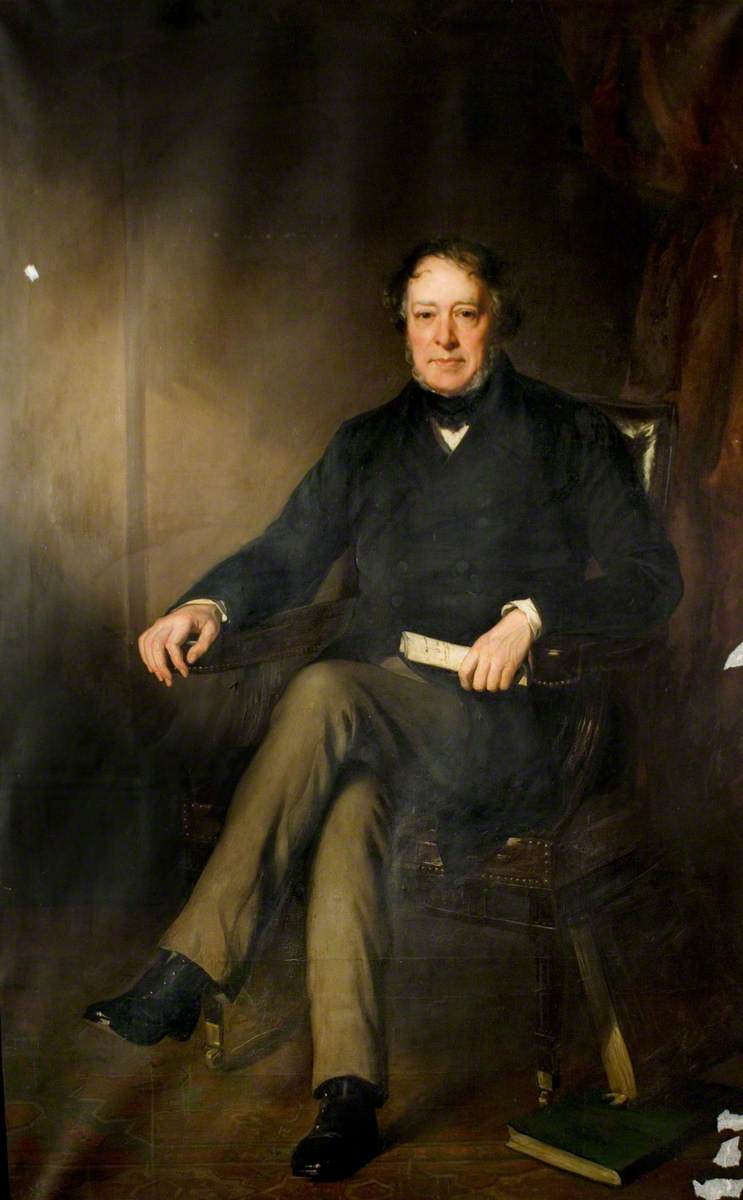
Edward Ellice by Francis Grant

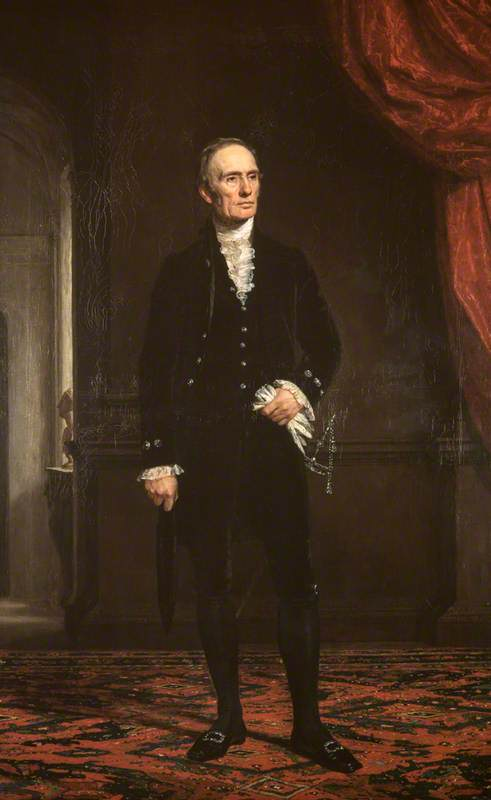
John Watson Gordon by John Graham-Gilbert

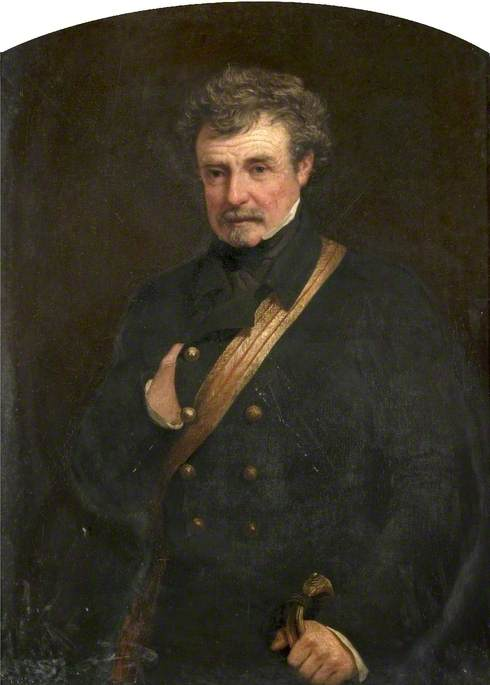
Colin Campbell by Henry Wyndham Phillips

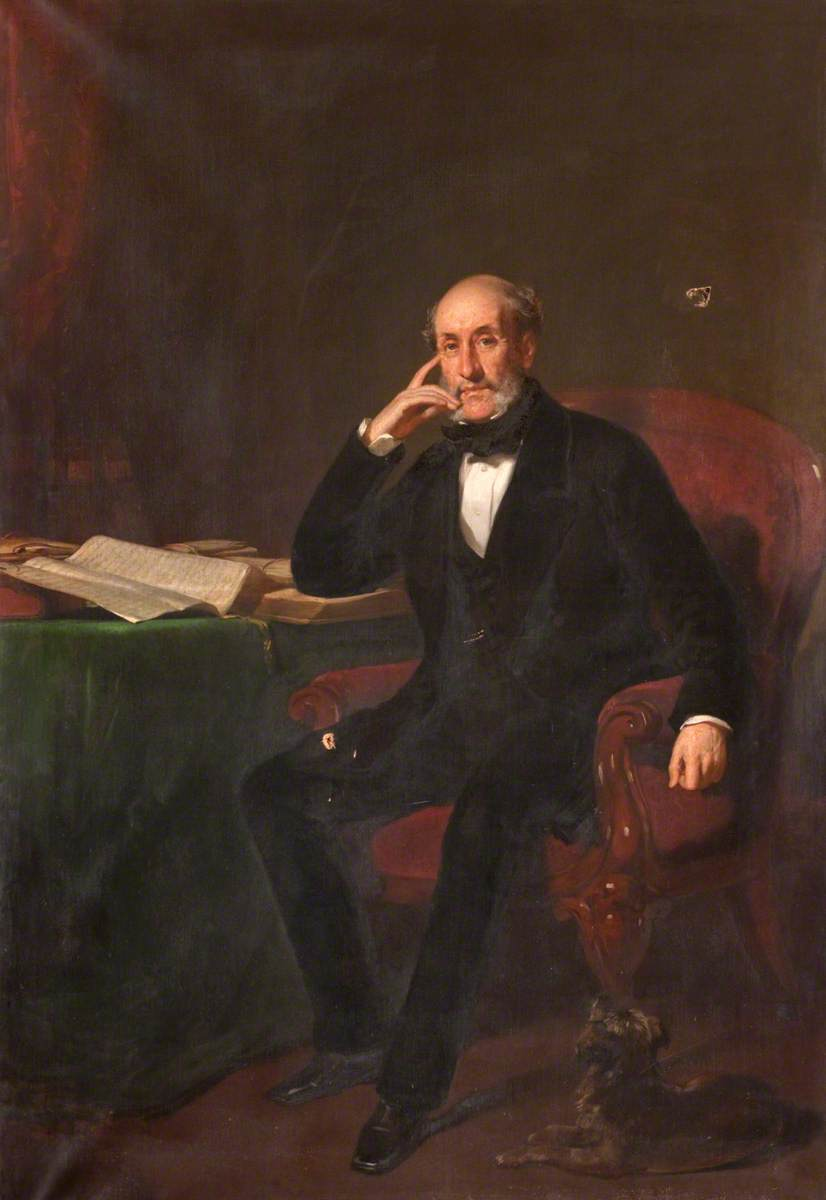
David Crawford by Daniel Macnee

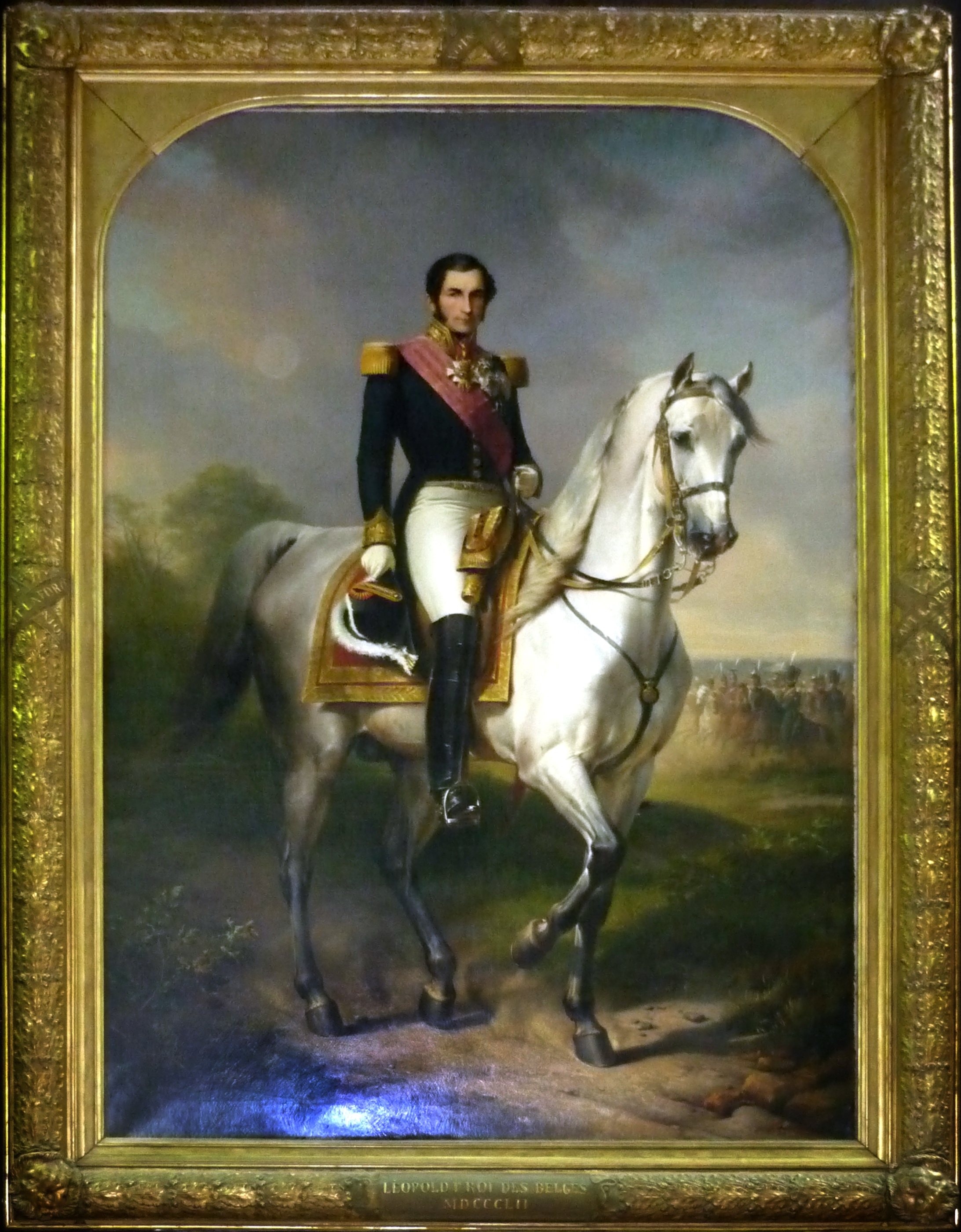
Leopold I of Belgium by Eugène Verboeckhoven

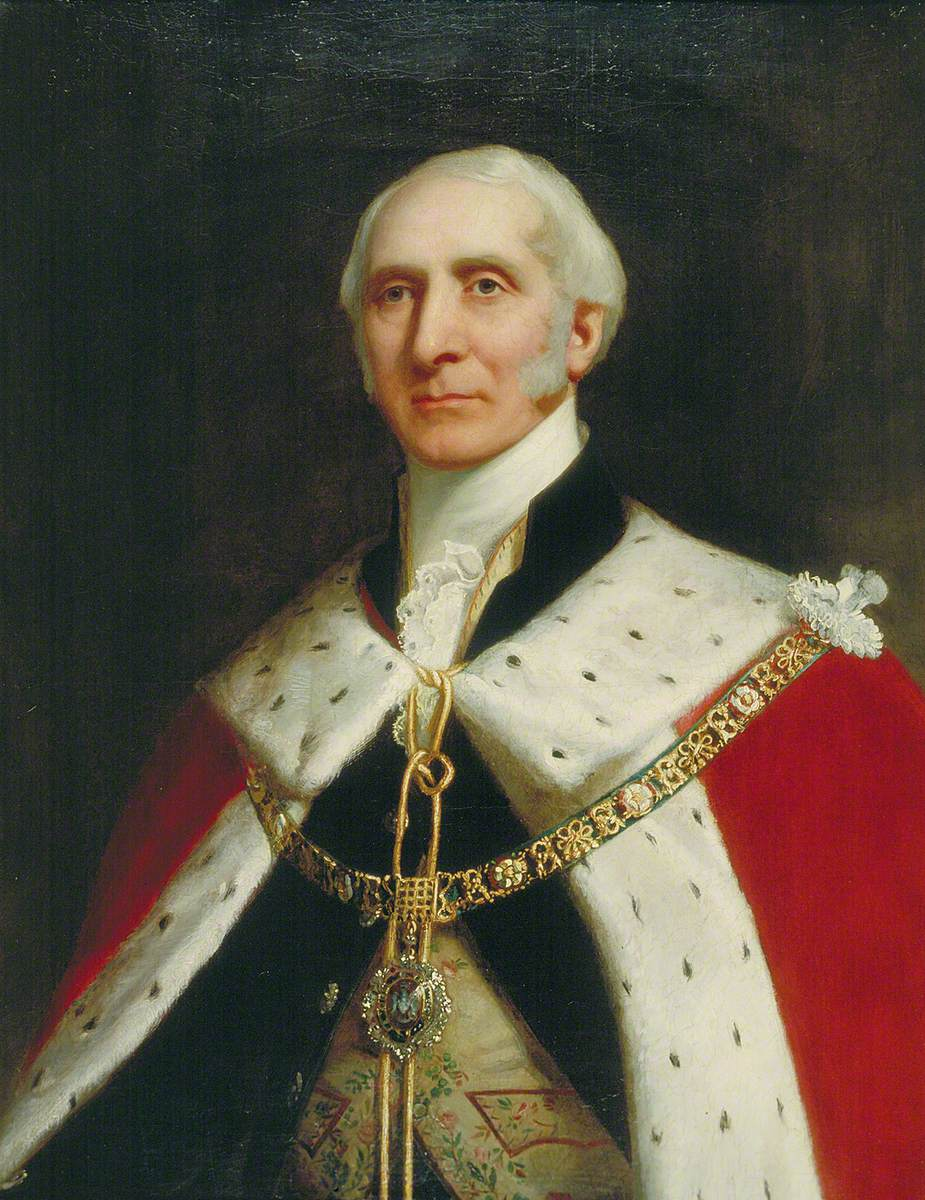
David Salomons by Solomon Hart

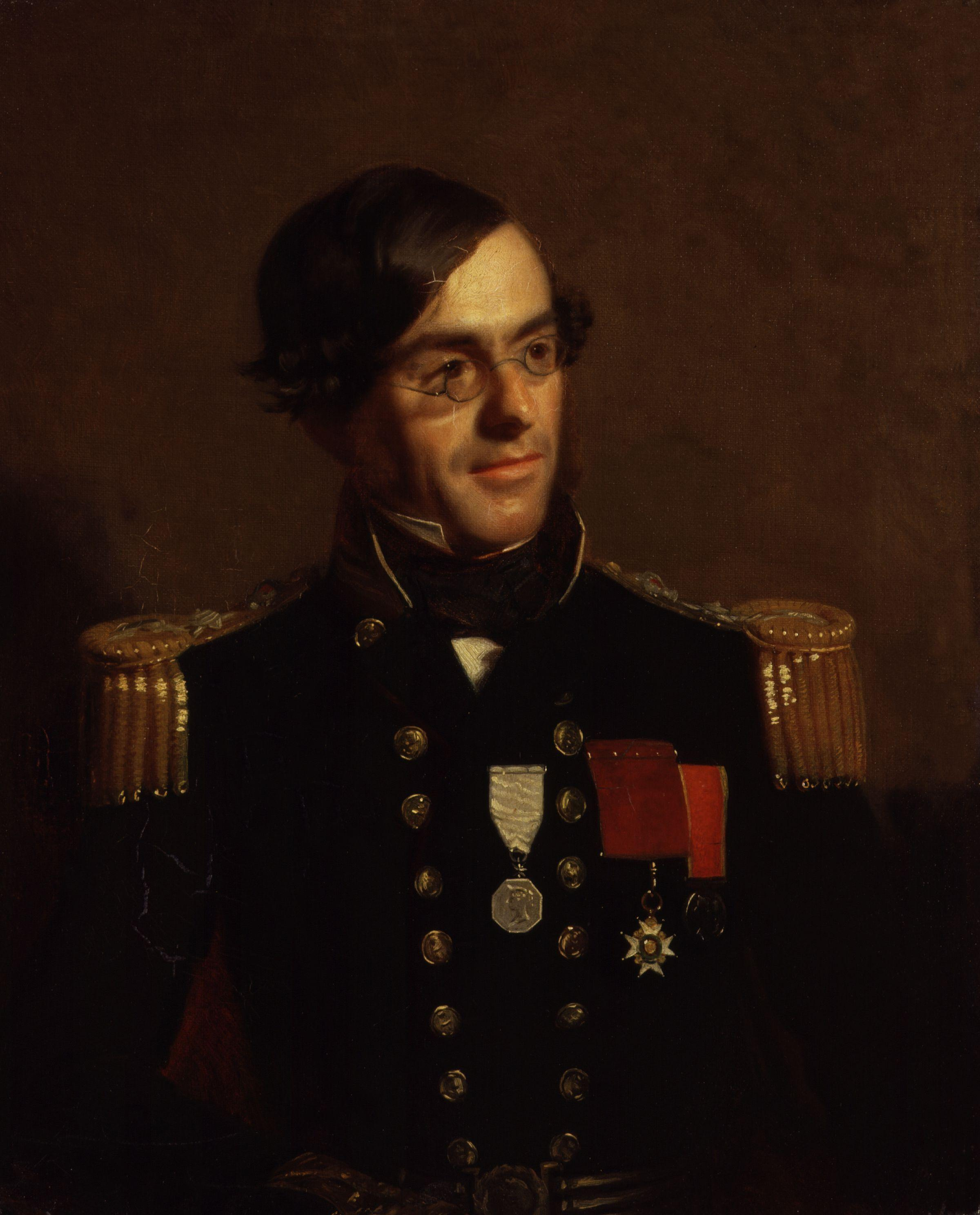
Richard Collinson by Stephen Pearce

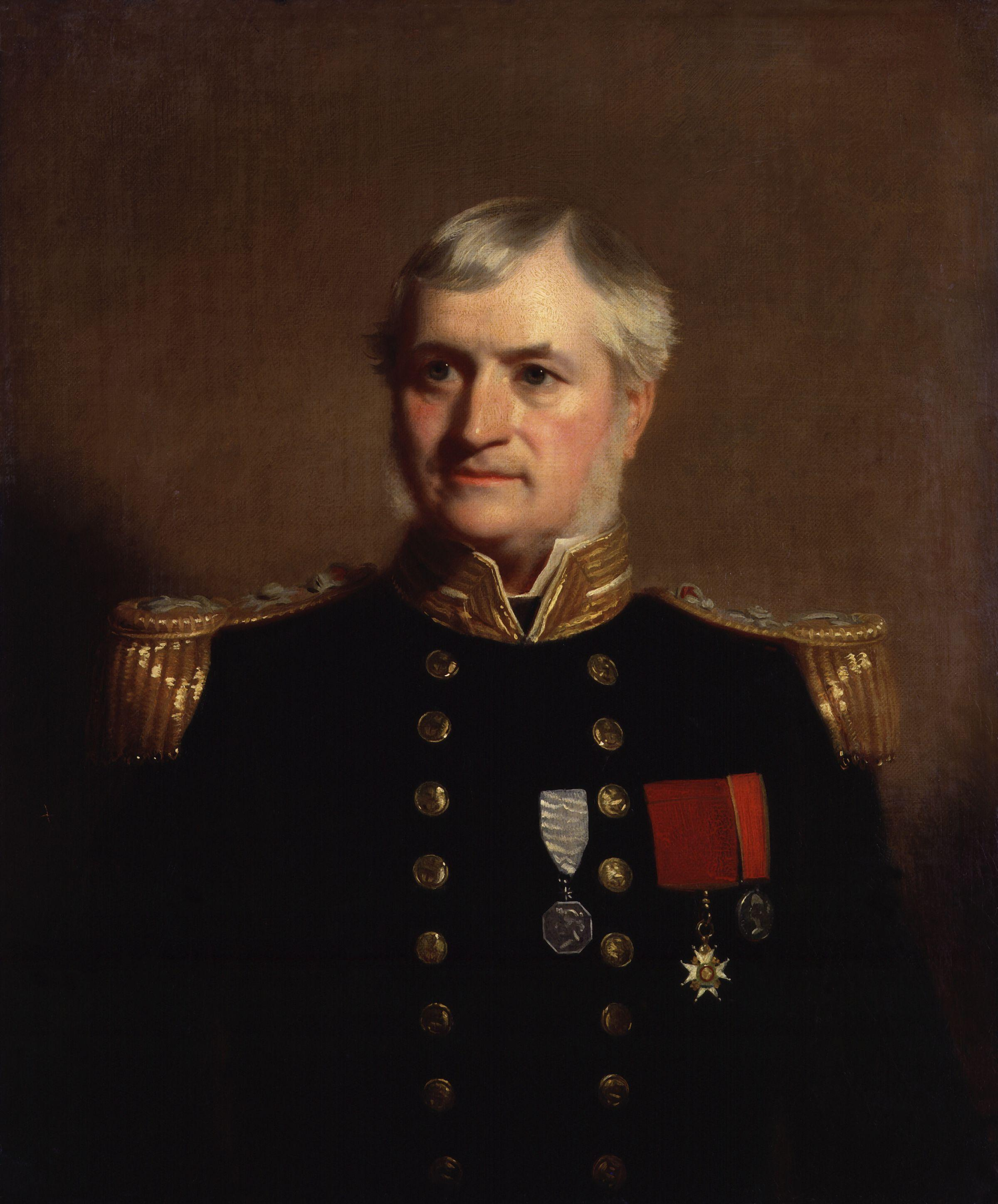
Henry Kellett by Stephen Pearce

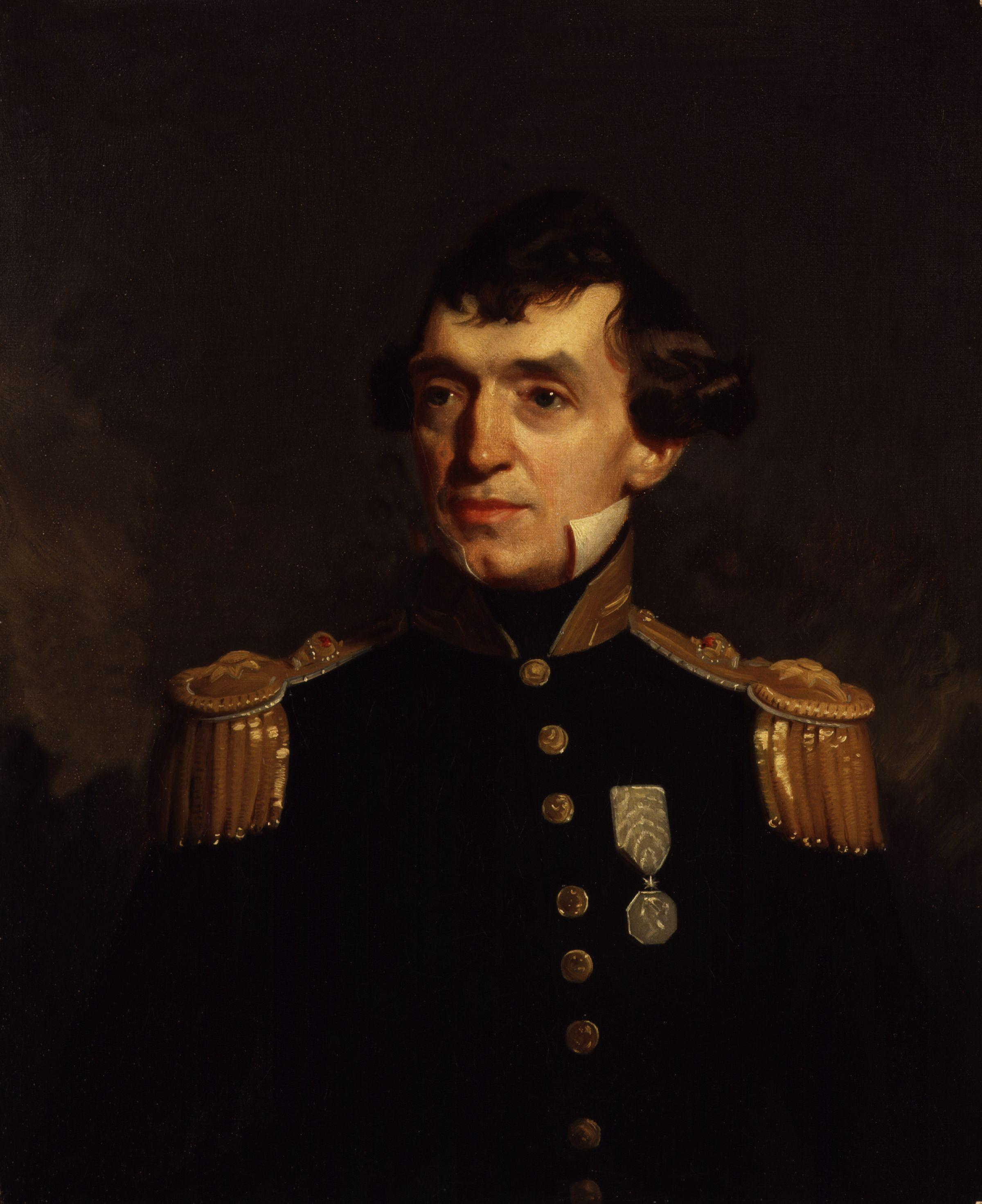
Robert McCormick by Stephen Pearce

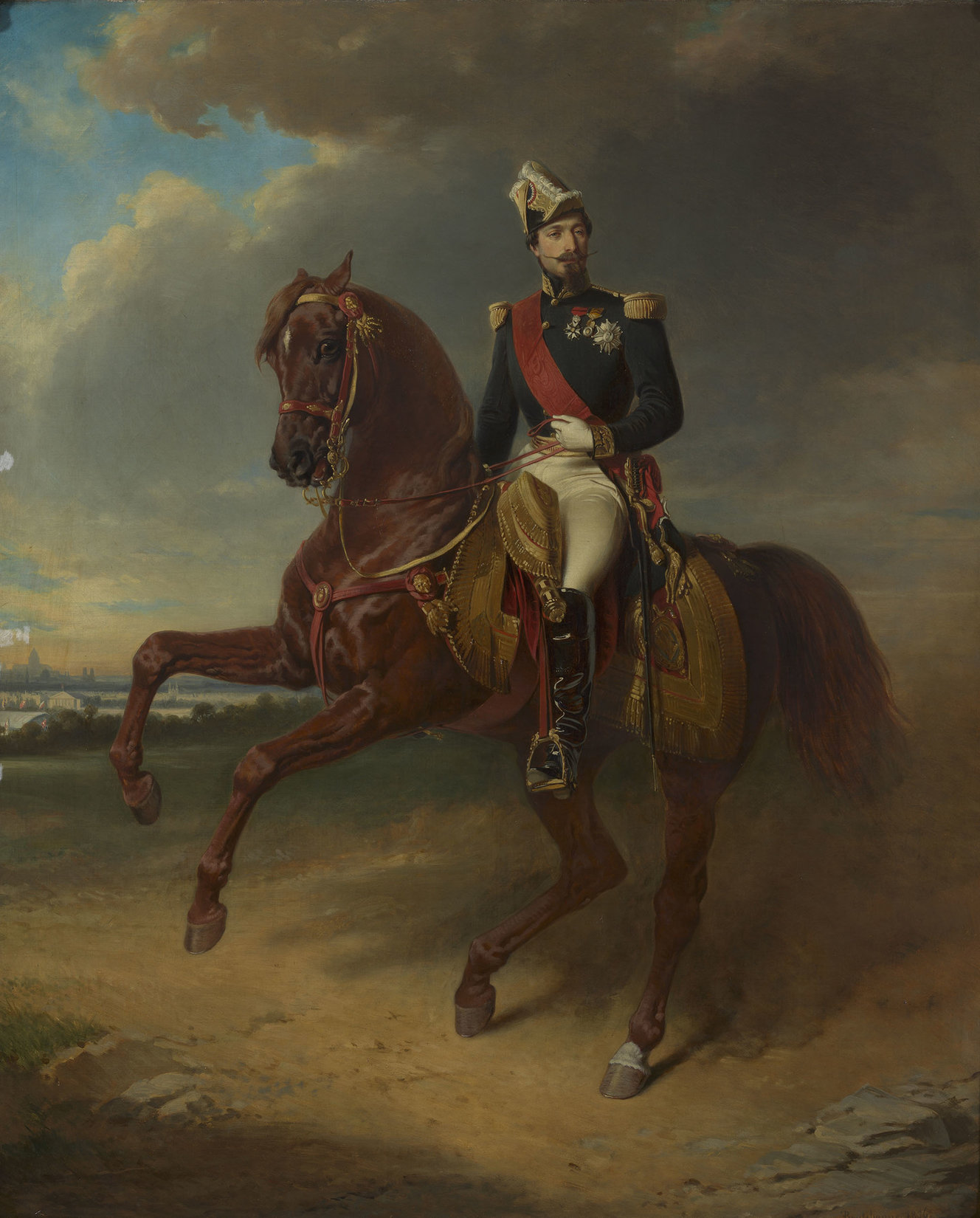
Napoleon III by Charles-Édouard Boutibonne

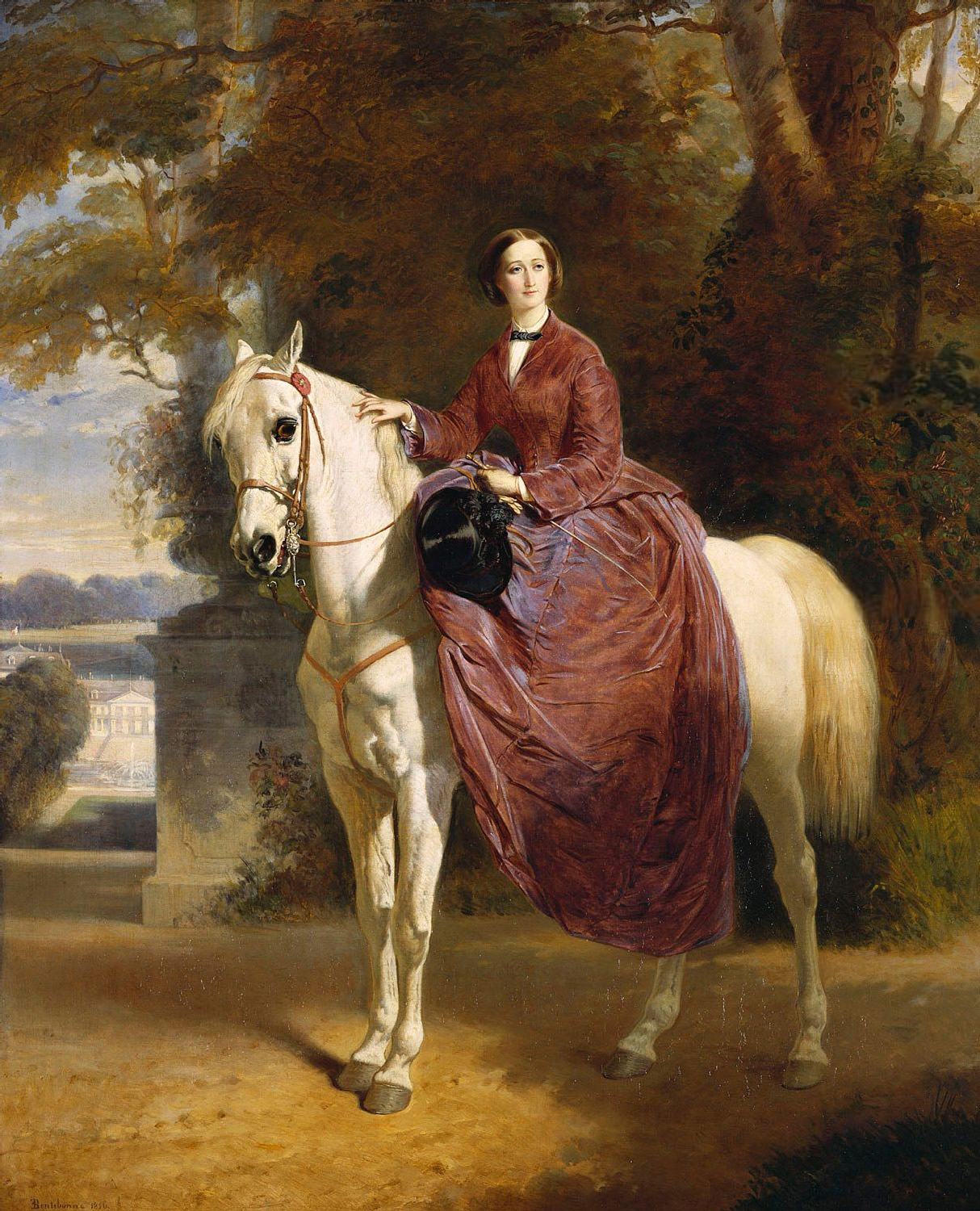
Empress Eugenie by Charles-Édouard Boutibonne

== Bibliography ==
- Prettlejohn, Elizabeth (ed.) The Cambridge Companion to the Pre-Raphaelites. Cambridge University Press, 2012.
- Riding, Christine. John Everett Millais. Harry N. Abrams, 2006.
- Van der Merwe, Pieter & Took, Roger. The Spectacular Career of Clarkson Stanfield. Tyne and Wear County Council Museums, 1979.
