= Byron's Early Love =

Painting by Edward Matthew Ward

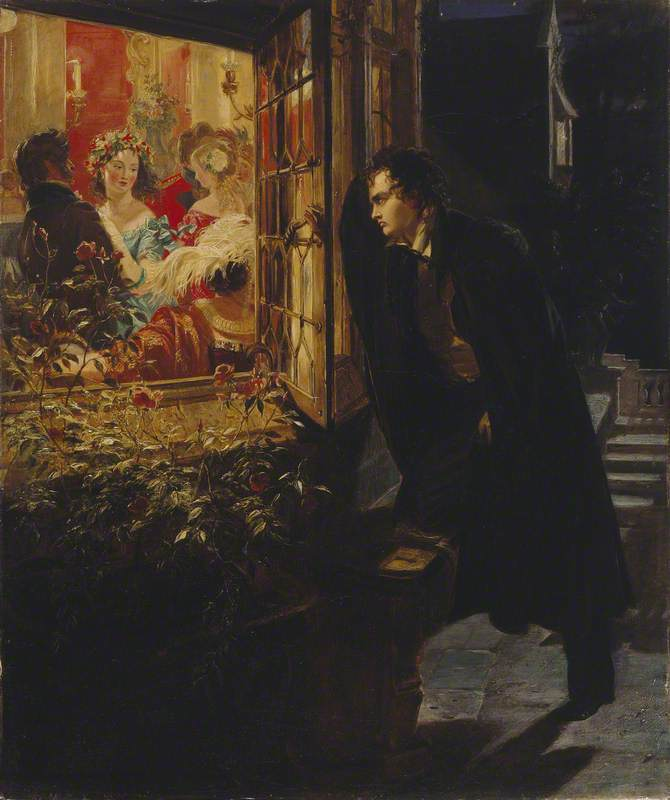
- Artist: Edward Matthew Ward
- Year: 1856
- Type: Oil on canvas, history painting
- Dimensions: 62 cm × 51.3 cm (24 in × 20.2 in)
- Location: Manchester Art Gallery, Greater Manchester

Byron's Early Love is an 1856 history painting by the British artist Edward Matthew Ward. Also known as A Dream of Annesley Hall it depicts an imagined scene from the early life of the Romantic poet Lord Byron inspired by his unrequited love for Mary Ann Chaworth. He stands outside the window of Annesley Hall in Nottinghamshire looking in at the brightly-lit ballroom from the darkness outside. The painting was displayed at the Royal Academy Exhibition of 1856 held at the National Gallery in London. It featured again respectively at the Royal Academy's Winter Exhibition of 1889 at Burlington House. Today it is in the collection of the Manchester Art Gallery, which acquired it in 1917.

== Bibliography ==
- Altick, Richard Daniel Paintings from Books: Art and Literature in Britain, 1760-1900. Ohio State University Press, 1985.
- Dafforne, James. The Life and Works of Edward Matthew Ward. Virtue and Company, 1879.
