= Portrait of Charles Dickens (Scheffer) =

Painting by Ary Scheffer

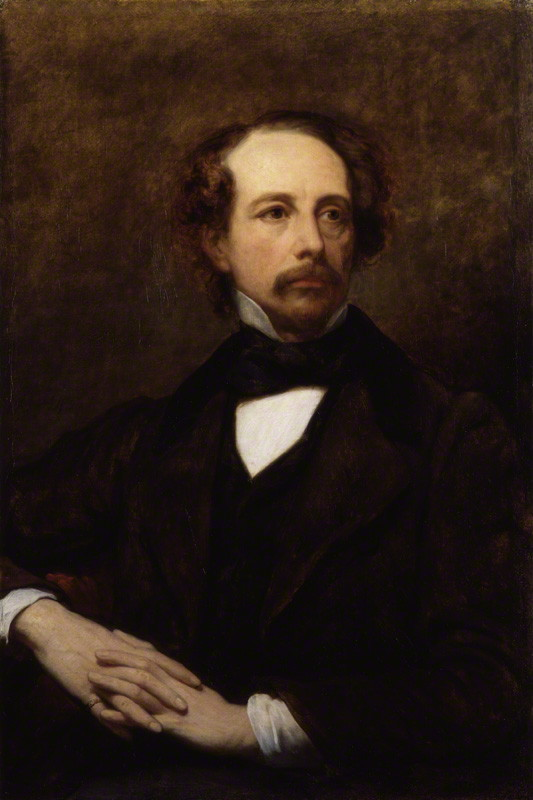
- Artist: Ary Scheffer
- Year: 1855
- Type: Oil on canvas, portrait painting
- Dimensions: 94.3 cm × 62.9 cm (37.1 in × 24.8 in)
- Location: National Portrait Gallery, London

Portrait of Charles Dickens is an oil on canvas portrait painting by the Dutch-French artist Ary Scheffer, from 1855. It depicts the British author Charles Dickens.

Dickens sat for the painting while visiting Paris. He is portrayed, seated, with hands crossed, looking sideways. The background of the paintings is brown and left undefined on purpose.

The painting was exhibited at the Royal Academy's Summer Exhibition in 1856. Today the work is in the collection of the National Portrait Gallery, in London, which purchased it in 1870.

== See also ==
- Charles Dickens in His Study, an 1859 portrait by William Powell Frith

== Bibliography ==
- Bledsoe, Robert Terrell Dickens, Journalism, Music: 'Household Words' and 'All The Year Round'. Continuum International Publishing, 2012.
- Ormond, Richard. Early Victorian Portraits: Text. H.M. Stationery Office, 1974.
- Choe, Jian,“'Storms and Vicissitudes’: The Portraits of Charles Dickens", The Dickensian, No. 525. Vol. 121, Spring 2025.
