= The Blind Girl =

Painting by John Everet Millais

- Artist: John Everett Millais
- Year: 1856
- Medium: Oil on canvas
- Dimensions: 83 cm × 62 cm (33 in × 24 in)
- Location: Birmingham Museum & Art Gallery, Birmingham

The Blind Girl is an oil on canvas painting by John Everett Millais, from 1856. It depicts two itinerant beggars, presumed to be sisters, one of whom is a blind musician, her concertina on her lap. They are resting by the roadside after a rainstorm, before travelling to the town of Winchelsea, visible in the background.

The painting has been interpreted as an allegory of the senses, contrasting the experiences of the blind and sighted sisters. The former feels the warmth of the sun on her face, and fondles a blade of grass, while the latter shields her eyes from the sun or rain and looks at a double rainbow that has just appeared. Some critics have interpreted the rainbow in Biblical terms, as the sign of God's covenant described in Genesis 9:16.

When the painting was first exhibited in 1856 it was pointed out to Millais that in double rainbows the secondary rainbow inverts the order of the colours. Millais had originally painted the colours in the same order in both rainbows. He altered it for scientific accuracy.

A tortoiseshell butterfly rests on the blind girl's shawl, implying that she is holding herself extremely still. The sign around her neck reads "Pity the Blind".

== See also ==
- List of paintings by John Everett Millais
