= National Register of Historic Places listings in Warren County, Virginia =

Location of Warren County in Virginia

This is a list of the National Register of Historic Places listings in Warren County, Virginia.

This is intended to be a complete list of the properties and districts on the National Register of Historic Places in Warren County, Virginia, United States. The locations of National Register properties and districts for which the latitude and longitude coordinates are included below, may be seen in an online map.

There are 25 properties and districts listed on the National Register in the county, including 3 National Historic Landmarks.

This National Park Service list is complete through NPS recent listings posted March 21, 2025.

== Current listings ==
	Name on the Register	Image	Date listed	Location	City or town	Description
1	Balthis House	Balthis House	August 11, 2004 (#04000860)	55 Chester St. 38°55′10″N 78°11′28″W	Front Royal	
2	Bel Air		September 23, 2024 (#100010834)	269 Happy Creek Road; 38°55′17″N 78°11′14″W	Front Royal	
3	Browntown Historic District		September 30, 2021 (#100006823)	Portions of Bentonville, Browntown, Fetchett, and Smith Run Rds., Gooney Manor Alley, Gooney Manor Loop, Smelser Ln. 38°48′40″N 78°14′01″W	Browntown	
4	Cedar Creek Battlefield and Belle Grove	Cedar Creek Battlefield and Belle Grove	August 11, 1969 (#69000243)	On Interstate 81 between Middletown and Strasburg; 39°00′00″N 78°18′40″W	Middletown	Site of the Battle of Cedar Creek; designated a National Historic Landmark District in 1969. Extends into Frederick County.
5	Compton Gap Site	Compton Gap Site	December 13, 1985 (#85003176)	Address Restricted	Luray	
6	Erin	Erin	December 28, 1979 (#79003093)	Northeast of Front Royal on U.S. Routes 340/522; 39°01′22″N 78°09′34″W	Front Royal	
7	Fairview Farm	Fairview Farm	June 5, 1986 (#86001249)	Rockland Rd. 38°59′40″N 78°07′53″W	Front Royal	
8	Flint Run Archeological District	Flint Run Archeological District	December 22, 1976 (#76002125)	Straddling the Shenandoah River below Karo; 38°52′07″N 78°15′15″W	Front Royal	Includes the Thunderbird Archeological District; occupies both sides of the river
9	Front Royal Historic District	Front Royal Historic District	April 11, 2003 (#03000209)	Irregular district around E. and W. Main St., and S. Royal Ave. 38°55′05″N 78°11′34″W	Front Royal	
10	Front Royal Recreational Park Historic District	Front Royal Recreational Park Historic District	October 27, 1992 (#91001975)	Country Club Rd., 1.1 miles (1.8 km) north of Riverton off U.S. Route 522; 38°57′30″N 78°11′10″W	Front Royal	
11	Killahevlin	Killahevlin	October 14, 1993 (#93001128)	1401 N. Royal Ave. 38°56′13″N 78°11′37″W	Front Royal	
12	Lackawanna	Lackawanna	May 16, 2014 (#14000240)	236 Riverside Dr. 38°56′43″N 78°11′39″W	Front Royal	
13	Long Meadow	Long Meadow	October 12, 1995 (#95001169)	Long Meadow Rd. about 0.9 miles south of its junction with Water Plant Rd. 38°59′02″N 78°18′08″W	Middletown	
14	Milford Battlefield	Milford Battlefield	August 11, 2004 (#04000854)	U.S. Route 340 and Overall Rd. 38°48′44″N 78°20′36″W	Overall	Extends into Page County
15	Mount Zion	Mount Zion	February 26, 1970 (#70000830)	Northeast of the junction of Milldale and Ashley Station Rds. 39°00′07″N 78°05′59″W	Milldale	
16	Mountain Home	Mountain Home	August 8, 2007 (#07000801)	2471 Remound Rd. 38°52′30″N 78°08′41″W	Front Royal	
17	Page County Bridge No. 1990	Page County Bridge No. 1990	May 15, 2008 (#08000423)	U.S. Route 340; 38°48′23″N 78°20′55″W	Overall	Extends into Page County
18	Riverside	Riverside	October 12, 1995 (#95001172)	1315 Old Winchester Pike; 38°56′42″N 78°11′47″W	Front Royal	
19	Riverton Historic District	Riverton Historic District	May 16, 2002 (#02000514)	Roughly along Crisman Dr., Duck St., Old Winchester Pike, the Queens Highway, Riverside Dr., Rugby St., and Strasburg Rd. 38°56′46″N 78°11′41″W	Front Royal	
20	Rockland Rural Historic District	Rockland Rural Historic District	November 17, 2015 (#15000809)	Roughly bounded by the Clarke County line, the Shenandoah River, Winchester Rd., and the Norfolk Southern railroad line 39°00′06″N 78°05′56″W	Front Royal	
21	Rose Hill	Rose Hill	May 23, 1996 (#96000578)	900 block of N. Royal Ave. 38°55′49″N 78°11′43″W	Front Royal	
22	Skyline Drive Historic District	Skyline Drive Historic District	April 28, 1997 (#97000375)	Shenandoah National Park, from the northern entrance station at Front Royal to the southern entrance station at Rockfish Gap; 38°46′49″N 78°12′10″W	Luray	
23	Sonner Hall	Sonner Hall	January 29, 1987 (#87000007)	3rd St. 38°55′23″N 78°11′53″W	Front Royal	
24	Thunderbird Archeological District	Thunderbird Archeological District	May 5, 1977 (#77001495)	Northern edge of the Shenandoah River floodplain, west of Kano; 38°52′10″N 78°16′19″W	Limeton	
25	Warren County Courthouse	Warren County Courthouse	January 28, 2000 (#00000028)	1 E. Main St. 38°55′03″N 78°11′35″W	Front Royal	

== See also ==
- List of National Historic Landmarks in Virginia
- National Register of Historic Places listings in Virginia
