= Thunderbird Archaeological District =

Archaeological site in Virginia, United States

- U.S. National Register of Historic Places
- U.S. National Historic Landmark District
- Virginia Landmarks Register
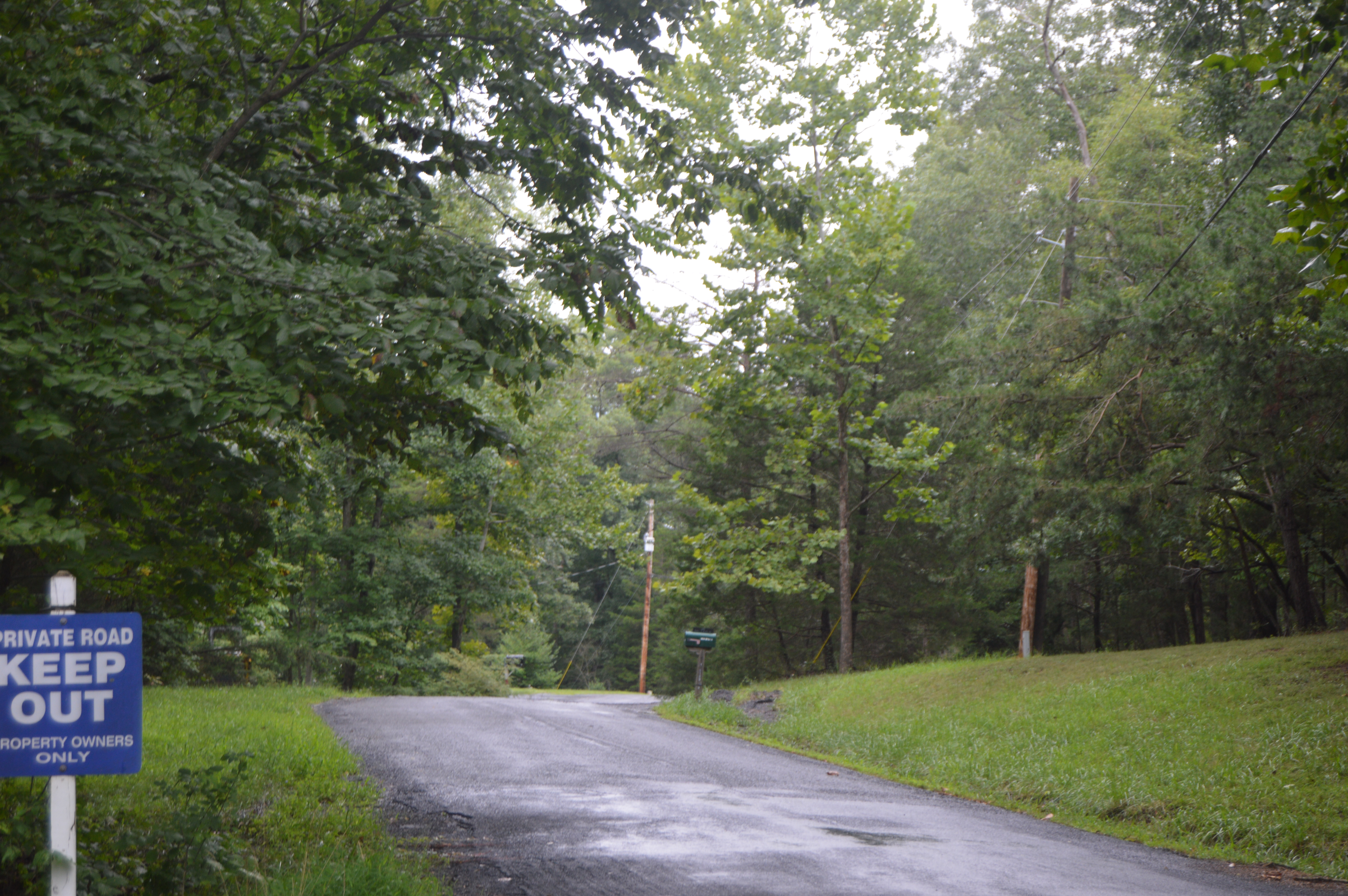
- Part of the neighborhood developed on top of the district
- Nearest city: Linden, Virginia
- NRHP reference No.: 77001495
- VLR No.: 093-0165

Significant dates
- Added to NRHP: May 5, 1977
- Designated NHLD: May 5, 1977
- Designated VLR: December 16, 1975

The Thunderbird Archaeological District, near Limeton, Virginia, is an archaeological district described as consisting of "three sites—Thunderbird Site, the Fifty Site, and the Fifty Bog—which provide a stratified cultural sequence spanning Paleo-Indian cultures through the end of Early Archaic times with scattered evidence of later occupation."

== Thunderbird Site ==
This archaeological site, located in Warren County, Virginia, near modern-day Front Royal in the Shenandoah River Valley is a major site of the Paleoindian Clovis culture in Virginia. It was designated a National Historic Landmark in 1977 because it yielded dense archaeological remains as well as evidence for what is quite possibly the oldest structure in North America. The site is one of three which make up the Thunderbird archaeological complex which consists of 2,500 acres of sites spanning the prehistoric era. The major occupations at Thunderbird site are known to date to the Late Pleistocene-Early Holocene epochs and include Clovis and later projectile point forms, as well as an array of other tools and manufacturing debris. Radiocarbon dates indicate some of the occupations date to 9900 BP (before present).

=== Background ===
Thunderbird is considered a part of the Flint Run Complex and consists of a group of sites located in and around a jasper quarry. Jasper is a mineral that is usually red and is known to break with a smooth surface. The site's relation to the quarry is important because the Paleoindians used the jasper to create tools, such as the Clovis points. It can also be used for decoration and for creating bow drills to start fires.

Thunderbird has yielded Clovis points that date between 9500 and 9000 B.C. The inhabitants of the site are presumed to have been hunters since the tool kit found is associated with hunting wild animals. Thunderbird is a stratified site that has evidence structures found just below the plow zone along with tools, points and flakes of points. Because of its stratified deposits, Thunderbird is one of the sites used to develop a sequence of Paleo-Indian and Early Archaic assemblages in Eastern North America. Not only does the site have Clovis points, Thunderbird also has been credited with a point that is rarely found throughout the Middle Atlantic region: the Hardaway Dalton point, a point with shallow side notches and a deep basal concavity. This point averages of 60 mm in length, 35 mm across and has an average thickness of 7 mm. The microblades found at Thunderbird site are rare and linked to a few other sites, which include the Williamson Site in Dinwiddie County. The Thunderbird site was originally located a great distance from the coast in the Late Pleistocene epoch, but it is now much closer to the coast due to rising sea levels and when occupied, seasonality would have been greater than at present.

=== Significant findings ===
It is believed that the Thunderbird site had a large population due to the vast number of artifacts discovered. This contradicts earlier views that Paleoindian peoples lived in small groupings except for the occasional large gathering for a few weeks at a time to maintain kinship networks as well as share food source knowledge.

The Thunderbird site is known for Clovis points, a projectile point that has bifacial flaking. Bifacial flaking is the knapping of a point on both sides to create a blade. These points can be found across most of North America.

== See also ==
- Clovis
- List of National Historic Landmarks in Virginia
- National Register of Historic Places listings in Warren County, Virginia
