= I. B. Laing =

American politician (1857–1926)

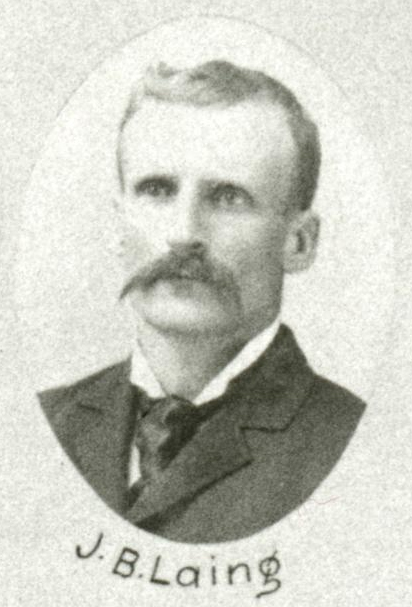
- Laing in 1895

Member of the Washington House of Representatives for the 14th district
- In office 1895–1897

Personal details
- Born: September 27, 1857 Front Royal, Virginia, United States
- Died: October 29, 1926 (aged 69) Tillamook County, Oregon, United States
- Party: Populist

Israel Beckner Laing (September 27, 1857 – October 29, 1926) was an American politician in the state of Washington. He served in the Washington House of Representatives from 1895 to 1897.
