= WFTR =

- Front Royal, Virginia; United States
- Broadcast area: Northern Virginia
- Frequency: 1450 kHz
- Branding: Fox Sports Radio 1450

Programming
- Language: English
- Format: Sports radio
- Affiliations: Fox Sports Radio; Washington Capitals; Washington Nationals

Ownership
- Owner: Royal Broadcasting, Inc.
- Sister stations: WZRV

History
- First air date: September 19, 1948
- Call sign meaning: Warren Front Royal

Technical information
- Licensing authority: FCC
- Facility ID: 63530
- Class: C
- Power: 1,000 watts (unlimited)
- Transmitter coordinates: 38°54′31.0″N 78°10′37.0″W

Links
- Public license information: Public file; LMS

WFTR is a sports radio formatted broadcast radio station licensed to Front Royal, Virginia, serving Northern Virginia. WFTR is owned and operated by Royal Broadcasting, Inc.

== History ==
WFTR began broadcasting September 19, 1948, as a Mutual affiliate on 1450 kHz, with 250 watts of power. The station was, at the time, licensed to the Sky-Park Broadcasting Corporation.
