= Spelunker's Frozen Custard & Cavern Burgers =

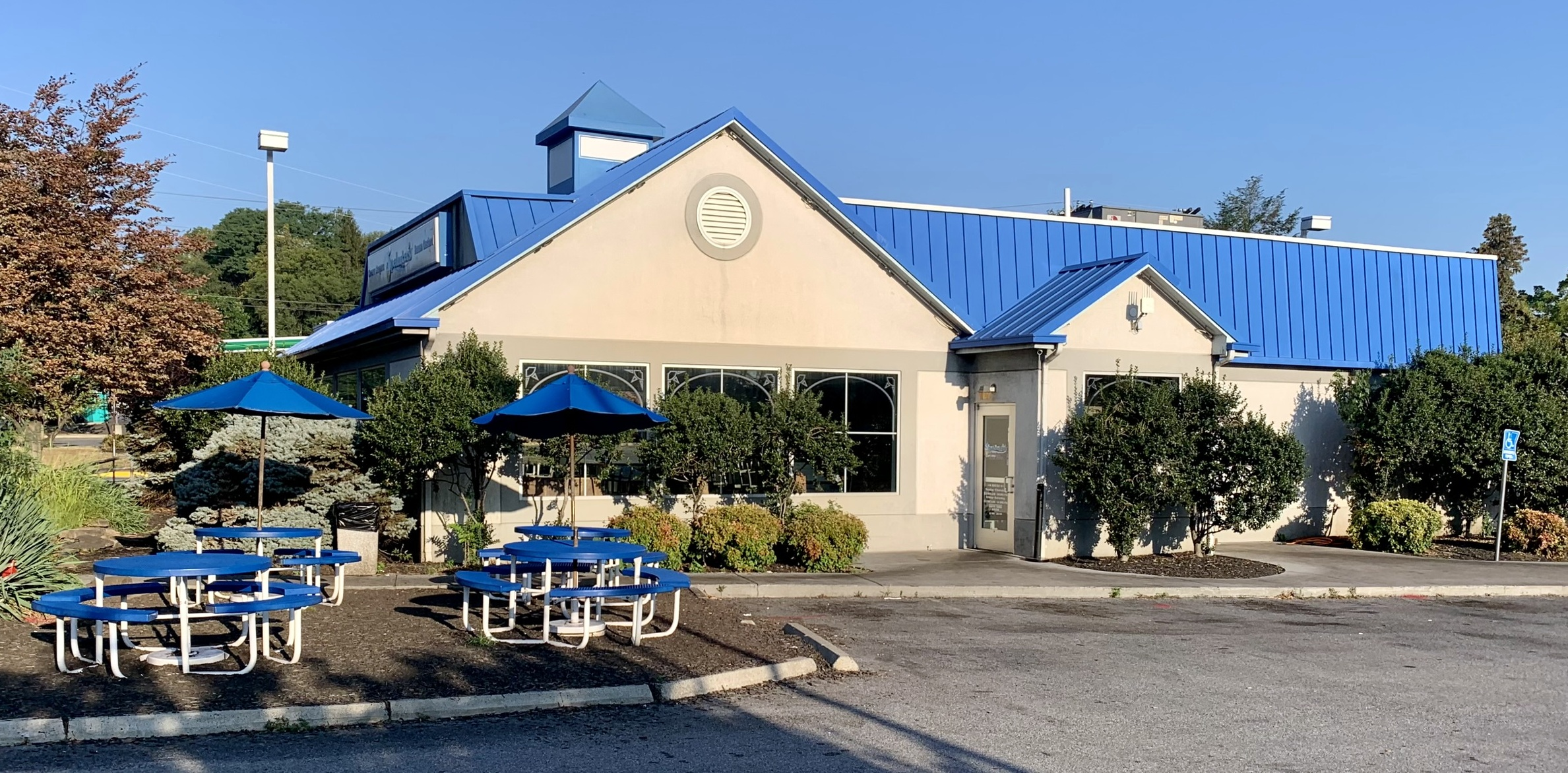
- Spelunker's in 2023

Restaurant information
- Established: 2002
- Owner: Bill Antonelli
- Manager(s): Steve and April Antonelli
- Food type: Burgers, Frozen custard
- Location: 116 South Street; Front Royal, Virginia, US
- Website: spelunkers-custard.com

Spelunker's Frozen Custard & Cavern Burgers, more commonly known as Spelunker's, is a 100-seat fast-food restaurant in Front Royal, Virginia, near the north entrance to Shenandoah National Park's Skyline Drive. The restaurant specializes in burgers and frozen custard. It was opened in 2002 by husband and wife, Steve and April Antonelli, in a former Long John Silver's building,

Spelunker's has become a very popular food destination for locals who eat burgers made of chuck steak and brisket, as well as a variety of frozen custard flavors, including a flavor of the day. During the COVID-19 pandemic, many restaurants suffered financially, but because of the drive-thru service and orders taken from the parking lot, Spelunker's business was minimally impacted. The restaurant has been praised by a The Washington Post food critic, and other media outlets have included it on lists of places to eat when visiting the Shenandoah Valley.

== History ==
Spelunker's Frozen Custard & Cavern Burgers, more commonly known as Spelunker's, is located at 116 South Street in Front Royal, Virginia, near the north entrance to Shenandoah National Park's Skyline Drive. Since opening in 2002, the restaurant has gained a strong following from repeat customers. The restaurant has stayed in the Antonelli family, with Bill Antonelli being the owner, and his son and daughter-in-law, Steve and April Antonelli, serving as co-founders and managers. The couple looked at commercial properties in Front Royal and the Shenandoah Valley area, and after seeing a former Long John Silver's available, they thought it would be a perfect location, even though it had a drive-thru the couple wasn't sure they needed.

During Steve's childhood he would eat frozen custard with his father at the Frozen Dairy Bar in Falls Church. That restaurant was always busy with people coming for the frozen custard. Steven and April decided to recreate that with their restaurant, an homage to Frozen Dairy Bar, with frozen custard served in the drive-thru.

Within a few years of opening, Spelunker's had become a popular local restaurant. In 2005, it was featured in the August issue of Northern Virginia Magazine. The restaurant was mentioned in a 2008 The Washington Post article about places to eat and visit in Front Royal. When interviewed by the reporter, locals praised Spelunker's frozen custard, which includes a flavor of the day and is served at approximately 18 degrees (-8 Celsius). The burgers, made from chuck steak and brisket, contains no additives or preservatives. This custom mix is ground twice daily. The hot dogs are made of beef and served in a New England–style bun. The chili is made at the restaurant and is somewhat spicy and sweet. Pureed carrots are used to make the chili sweet.

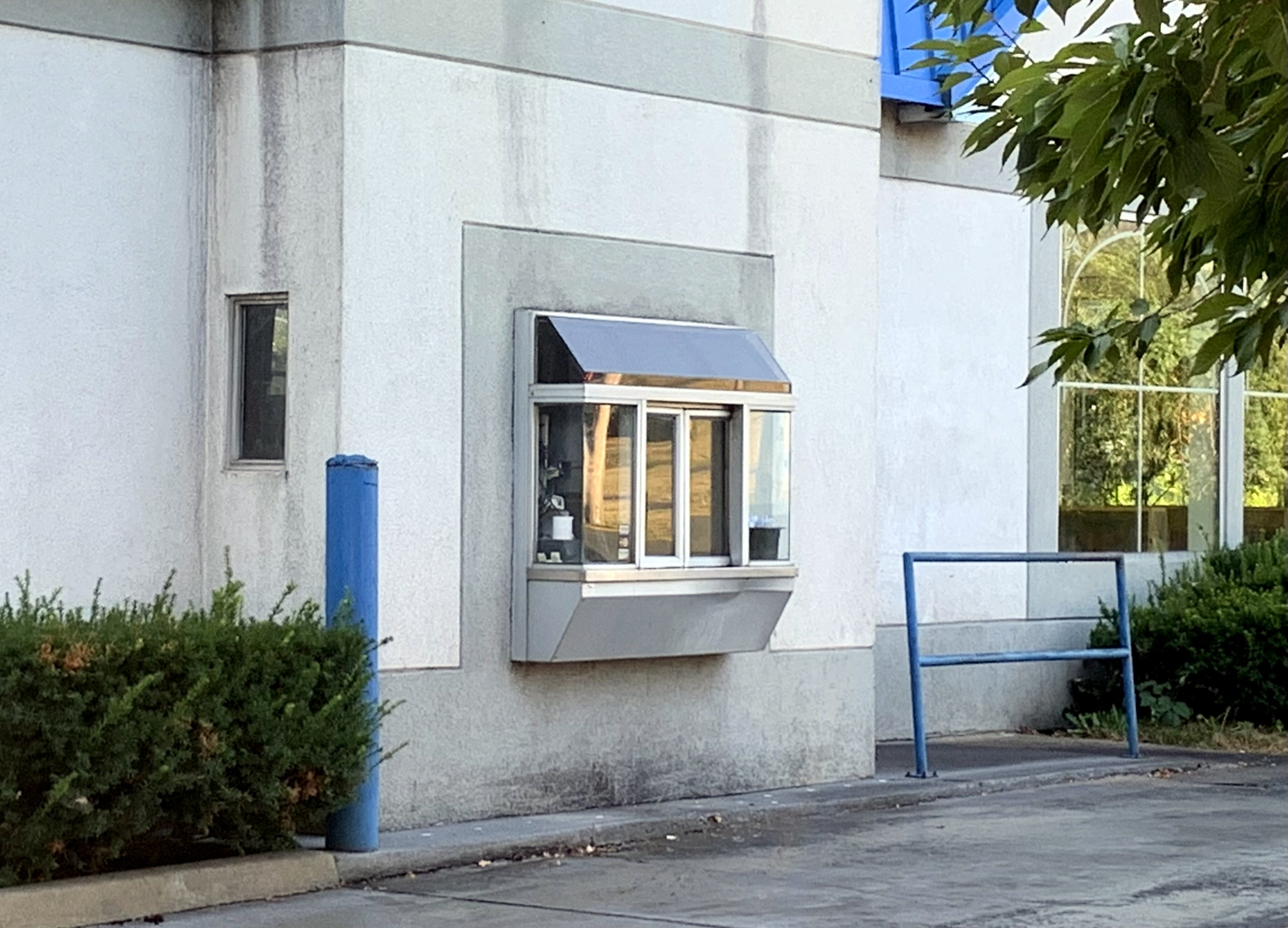
The drive-thru at Spelunker's

During the COVID-19 pandemic, when restaurants were ordered to stop indoor dining, owners Steve and April Antonelli kept Spelunker's drive-thru open, which "would serve as the lifeblood of their family business in Front Royal." They replaced the limited drive-thru menu with one offering all items. Employees would also take orders from the parking lot using portable tablets. With the success of a busy drive-thru, Spelunker's revenue only went down around 20%, a much better result than many restaurants during the lockdown.

The Washington Post food reporter Tim Carman visited during COVID lockdown. His response after eating a Spelunker's burger was "If I've had a better hamburger pulled from a bag, I can't remember when." In regards to the frozen custard, Carman said "I only stopped eating it because it was gone."

In 2021, the restaurant added more parking spaces after the Front Royal Planning Commission agreed to rezone a 0.45 acre (0.16 hectares) lot in a residential area. The restaurant uses a house on the property as storage space. The following year, Spelunker's was mentioned in Washingtonian magazine's list of "Fantastic Foodie Getaways." Describing it as a destination burger, the magazine noted the Cavern Burger is available as one patty or two. It was also noted the french fries are cooked with the skin on. (The potato is unpeeled before cutting) In 2023, DC Eater included Spelunker's on a list of places to eat when visiting the Shenandoah Valley.

== See also ==
- List of hamburger restaurants
