= WZRV =

Classic hits radio station in Front Royal, Virginia

- Front Royal, Virginia; United States
- Broadcast area: Winchester metropolitan area
- Frequency: 95.3 MHz
- Branding: The River 95-3

Programming
- Language: English
- Format: Classic hits
- Affiliations: ABC News Radio

Ownership
- Owner: Royal Broadcasting, Inc.
- Sister stations: WFTR

History
- First air date: 1981
- Former call signs: WIXV (1981–1983); WFTR-FM (1983–2000); WDRV (2000–2001)
- Call sign meaning: "River"

Technical information
- Licensing authority: FCC
- Facility ID: 63529
- Class: A
- ERP: 6,000 watts
- HAAT: 91 meters (299 ft)
- Transmitter coordinates: 38°58′31.40″N 78°12′5.0″W

Links
- Public license information: Public file; LMS
- Webcast: Listen live
- Website: theriver953.com

WZRV (95.3 MHz) is a classic hits formatted broadcast commercial FM radio station. The station is licensed to Front Royal, Virginia and serves the Winchester metropolitan area. WZRV is owned and operated by Royal Broadcasting, Inc.
