= Warren County Courthouse (Virginia) =

- U.S. National Register of Historic Places
- U.S. Historic district – Contributing property
- Virginia Landmarks Register
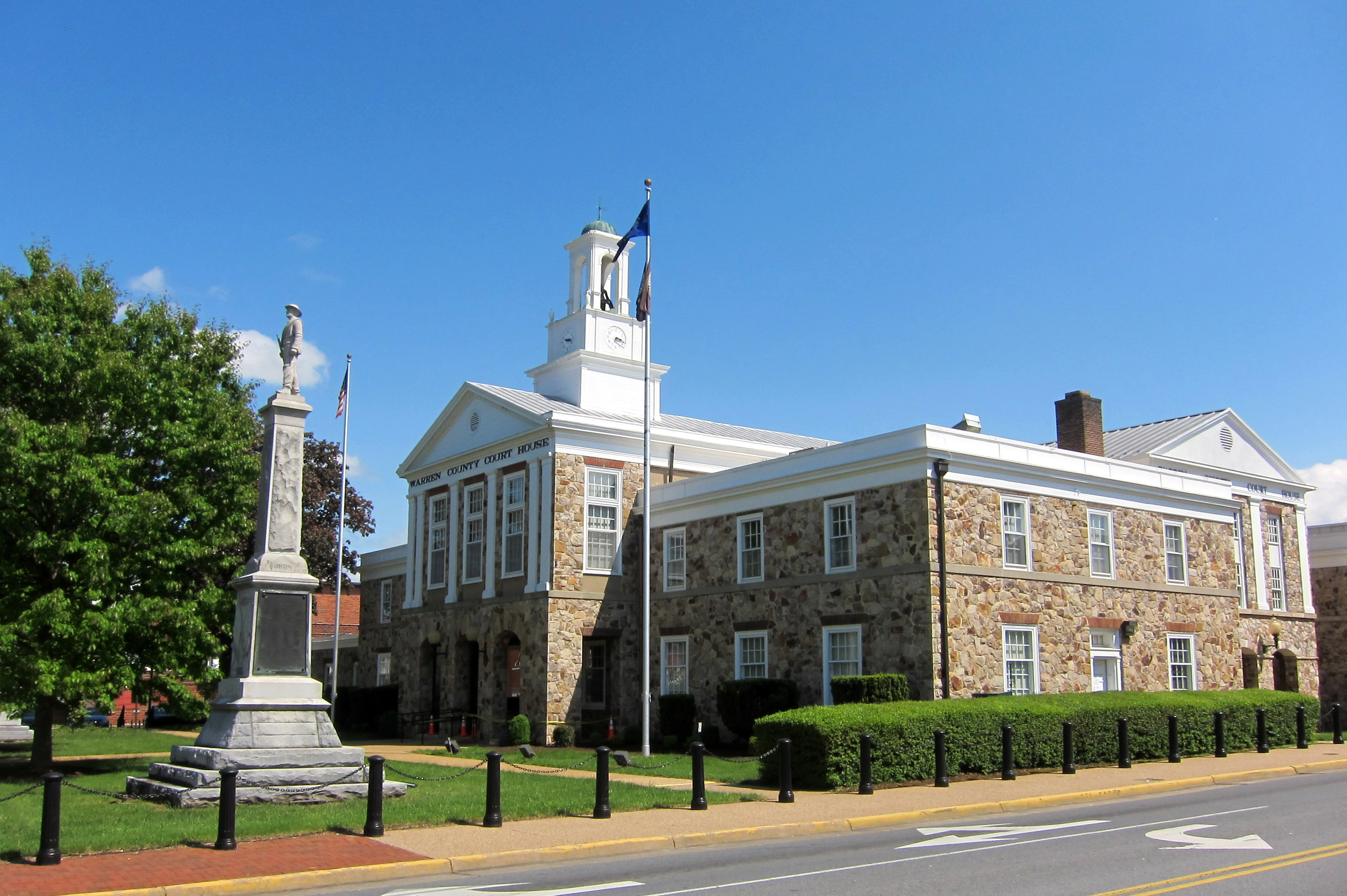
- Warren County Courthouse and Confederate statue, May 2016

- Location within Shenandoah Valley Location within Northern Virginia Location within Virginia Location within the United States
- Location: 1 E. Main St., Front Royal, Virginia
- Coordinates: 38°55′3″N 78°11′36″W
- Area: 1.7 acres (0.69 ha)
- Built: c. 1836, 1935-1936, c. 1950
- Architect: Saville, Alan J.
- Architectural style: Colonial Revival
- NRHP reference No.: 00000028
- VLR No.: 112-0005

Significant dates
- Added to NRHP: January 28, 2000
- Designated VLR: December 1, 1999

Warren County Courthouse is a historic county courthouse complex located at Front Royal, Warren County, Virginia. It was built in 1935–1936, and is a two-story, stone faced concrete block, Colonial Revival style building. It consists of a central rectangular block with a pedimented gable roof and smaller flanking recessed wings. The central block is topped by a three-stage cupola with an open and domed belfry. Also on the property are the contributing brick clerk's office (c. 1836), brick jail (c. 1950), and two war memorials - a Confederate Monument, dedicated in 1911, and an obelisk honoring veterans of World Wars I and II.

It was listed on the National Register of Historic Places in 2000. It is located in the Front Royal Historic District.

== See also ==
- National Register of Historic Places listings in Warren County, Virginia
