= Warren County High School (Virginia) =

Location
- 155 Westminster Drive; Front Royal, Virginia 22630; United States
- 38°54′59.6″N 78°10′2.1″W

Information
- School type: Public, high school
- Principal: Kenneth Knesh
- Teaching staff: 59.48 (FTE) (2021-2022)
- Grades: 9–12
- Gender: Co-educational
- Enrollment: 818 (2023-2024)
- Student to teacher ratio: 14.27:1 (2021-2021)
- Colors: Maroon; White
- Athletics conference: VHSL Evergreen District, Region II, Group AA
- Mascot: Wildcats
- Rivals: Skyline Hawks; Handley Judges
- Website: wchs.wcpsva.org

Warren County High School (WCHS) is a high school located in Front Royal, Virginia. The mascot is a Wildcat, and its colors are maroon, silver, and white. Warren County competes in VHSL activities in the Evergreen District, Region II, Group AA. Its main rivals are Skyline High School and John Handley High School. For 67 years it was located on Luray Avenue. A new WCHS (Fall 2007) is located on Westminster Drive, serving the eastern 40% of the county.

Skyline High School opened in the Fall of 2007, serving the western 60% of the county.

== 1910s-1950s (Early history) ==
In 1906, a high school department was added to Front Royal's first public school at 21-23 South Royal Avenue (c1870, still standing). In 1910 a new building for both the grade school and the Front Royal High School opened on Crescent St. (site of the current E. Wilson Morrison Elementary School). In 1918 the school board changed the name to Warren County High School, reflecting the consolidation of several county schools. County population growth, particularly accompanying the American Viscose rayon factory opening, necessitated a new high school building, occupied in 1940. The impressively sited, Classical Revival-style, Works Progress Administration-funded building was erected on Luray Avenue, and originally housed grades eight through twelve, but is now Skyline Middle School. The Crescent St. high school building burned in 1942 and the elementary school was expanded on the site thereafter. A sports rivalry with nearby John Handley High School in Winchester, became one-sided and diminished in the late 1960s as Handley focused more on nearby Frederick County (VA) rival James Wood High School.

=== Segregation issues in the 1950s ===
In the 1950s, the WCHS football team had several undefeated seasons. This success came to an end during the segregation/integration crisis of the late 1950s. Because WCHS was the only high school in the County (no "separate but equal" black high school), and local authorities were not ready to comply with U.S. Supreme court-ordered integration, WCHS was ordered closed by the Governor in the fall of 1958, as part of Virginia's "massive resistance" to implementation of the U.S. Supreme Court's decision in Brown vs. Board of Education. (See also Virginia governor J. Lindsay Almond and the Stanley Plan). Although the high school building was closed, education continued in donated private and church spaces. Many seniors transferred to neighboring Rappahannock County (where an even smaller black population was not as politically active and the integration issue was not forced). Local Warren County 1959 graduation was held at the Park movie theater on Main St. There is no official WCHS Class of '59. Massive Resistance and Virginia's segregationist school efforts were given up by the end of the 1958-59 school year. The Luray Avenue building re-opened in the fall of 1959 with a significantly reduced white student population and 22 black students. Also in the fall of 1959 (after a hurried construction process) John S. Mosby Academy (grades 1-12), one of Virginia's several segregation academies opened, as well as public Criser High School, serving the black high school student population of Warren and Rappahannock counties (Criser was an effort to provide "separate but equal", segregated facilities). By the mid-1960s there were enough (black and white) students at WCHS to again field viable athletic teams. Black students continued to have a choice in high schools until Criser closed in 1966 due to declining enrollment. The Criser building was Warren County's middle school in the late 1960s and is now Ressie Jeffries Elementary School. (Note: There had always been a public elementary school for Warren County's small (less than 10%) black population, but high school-aged students attended classes in neighboring counties with black-only facilities.)

Due to declining enrollment and financial challenges, Mosby closed at the end of the 1968-69 school year. Warren County Public Schools acquired the facility and to relieve crowding, it was used as the Junior High (grades 7-9) until 1988 (the Luray Avenue building had only grades 10-12 during this time), became a Middle School (grades 6-8) for another ten years, and closed as a school building at the end of the 2009-10 school year.

== 1960s-1980s (Post-integration) ==
The 1960s also saw the last success of Warren County football for over 35 years. A promising start during the integrated era (four winning seasons in 1965-66-67-69) sputtered, with a 6-4 season in 1973 the last winning season until the 2003 campaign. The 1960s also saw several Wildcats win state titles in forensics.

Overcrowding was alleviated again in the late 1970s, with the construction of the Fine Arts wing (which included a new gymnasium and new library in the old gym) and the Vocational Technology (also known as the "Vo-Tech") building. WCHS sports teams never played varsity field contests at the Luray Avenue site. The baseball team played at Front Royal's Bing Crosby Stadium and the football team played there through the early 1970s when contests were moved to the Mosby facility which included a football field (under control of the school system, not the municipality).

Warren County's basketball teams began to achieve some success in the late 1970s under long-time head coach Jim Moose. While other powers such as R.E. Lee-Staunton were dominant during this era, Moose's Warren County teams provided Lee and other Region II powers with good competition. Warren County advanced to the state quarterfinals three times during the 1980s and 1990s but never advanced past the semifinals.

Softball teams under Bob Mason won two state titles in 1983 and 1984.

== 1990s ==
The overcrowded high school became a political issue during the late 1980s as Warren County's population grew. A movement grew to build a new and larger high school, but a bond issue to build such a school was defeated in 1991.

The opposition was based around not only the cost of the new school but also a fear of the school being so large that it would be forced to compete in VHSL Group AAA activities. This was not solely an issue of wanting Warren County to do well: nearby James Wood High School had been forced into Group AAA during the 1980s and travelled two or more hours to play required district matches. This was in addition to the concern over students "being lost" in a school that was too big.

Eventually, the pressure of numbers, especially in the lower grades, became a violation of educational specifications. A realignment saw the Luray Avenue building with freshmen in the Fall of 1988, the first time since the 1968-69 school year. This arrangement continued for several years. An additional elementary school was built for the eastern part of the county in the mid-1990s, and an adjacent facility for grades 8 and 9 was built a few years later, allowing the high school once again to be just for grades 10-12.

== 2000s to current day ==
A revival of the football program also occurred starting in 2003. By 2004, Warren County was one of the largest schools in Group AA, with over 1,650 students, due to being an outer suburb of Washington, D.C. The Warren County School Board approved a large capital improvement plan that would see Warren County's high school population split.

The newer 8-9 facility off Westminster Drive in the eastern part of the county was expanded into a full-featured high school (and assumed the Warren County High School name, colors, mascot, and records) and a new high school facility was built for the western part of the County on Rt. 340 South (by the community's suggestion, the school was named Skyline High School, with green, blue, and gold colors and a hawk mascot). Each school served grades 8-12, contained a full complement of athletic fields, and opened in the Fall of 2007. An alternate plan would have named the schools "East Warren County High School" and "West Warren County High School".

Warren County High School is one of the smallest high schools in Group AA. Enrollment at Warren is lower than at Skyline. Since Warren serves the eastern end of the county that is closer to Washington, DC, it was hoped that population and enrollment would increase faster at Warren than at Skyline to make up the difference. The 2008-09 economic recession slowed such predicted growth.

Students at Warren County (and Skyline) are also eligible to apply to Mountain Vista Governor's School to take advanced math, science, humanities, and research courses.

In the Fall of 2010, the Luray Avenue building re-opened as Warren County Middle School after an extensive, three-year, remodeling to accommodate all of the County's sixth and seventh graders (approx 825 in the 2011-12 school year). Significant tax credits made feasible the restoration of much of the 1940 portion of the facility to its original "grandeur", including extensive woodwork preservation and slate chalkboard restoration.

In 2013 the County approved design for construction of a second middle school, in the eastern part of the County, near WCHS. This facility opened in August 2017 as Warren County Middle School. The historic Luray Avenue building is now designated Skyline Middle School. This arrangement allows the County to divide the WCHS and Skyline student populations in the sixth grade and relieve anticipated crowding at the high schools by returning the County's 8th graders to middle school facilities.
