= Skyline High School (Virginia) =

Public high school in Virginia, US

Location
- 151 Skyline Vista Drive; Shenandoah Valley; Front Royal, Warren, Virginia 22630; United States; 38°54′25.1″N 78°12′27.4″W

Information
- School type: Public, high school
- School district: Warren County Public Schools
- NCES School ID: 510387002657
- Principal: Jody Lee
- Asst Principal: Sonya Lawrence
- Asst Principal: Ryan Mettinger
- Dean of Students: Jessica Allen
- Teaching staff: 57.56 (on an FTE basis)
- Grades: 9–12
- Enrollment: 894 (2022-2023)
- Student to teacher ratio: 15.25
- Schedule type: 4x4 Block
- Campus size: ≈ 67 acres
- Campus type: Rural
- Color: Blue Green Gold
- Athletics conference: VHSL Class 2 Bull Run District
- Mascot: Hercules the Hawk
- Nickname: Hawks
- Rivals: Warren County Wildcats
- Accreditations: Accredited (VDOE)
- Alma Mater: "On the Bend of Shenandoah" by Tom Bowen
- Website: shs.wcpsva.org

Skyline High School is a 9–12 public high school in Front Royal, Virginia, United States. It serves students residing in the western part of Warren County.

== History ==
The school was built as a response to the growing population of Warren County. Skyline, which opened for classes in Fall 2007, educates 51.7% of the county's high school age population.

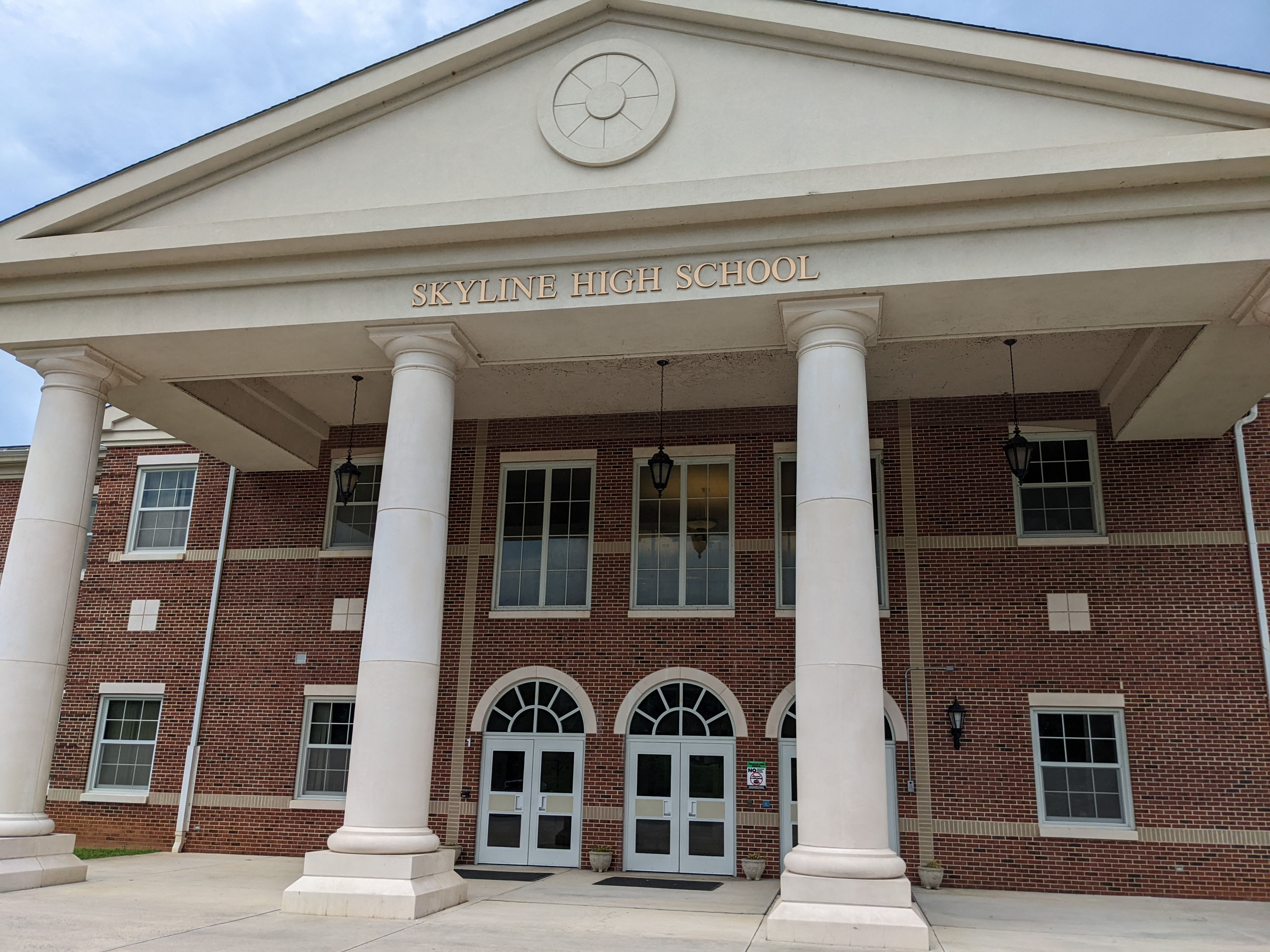
The eastern, main facade of Skyline High School.

The former Warren County High School on Luray Avenue, which was the original high school for all students in Warren County opened in 1940, is now Skyline Middle School, the primary feeder middle school for Skyline High.

== Athletics ==
The Skyline Hawks' colors are dark blue, dark green, and gold. In athletic and academic competition they are part of the Bull Run District of the Virginia High School League. Skyline's chief rival is neighboring Warren County High School.
