= Balthis House =

Historic house in Virginia, United States

- U.S. National Register of Historic Places
- U.S. Historic district – Contributing property
- Virginia Landmarks Register
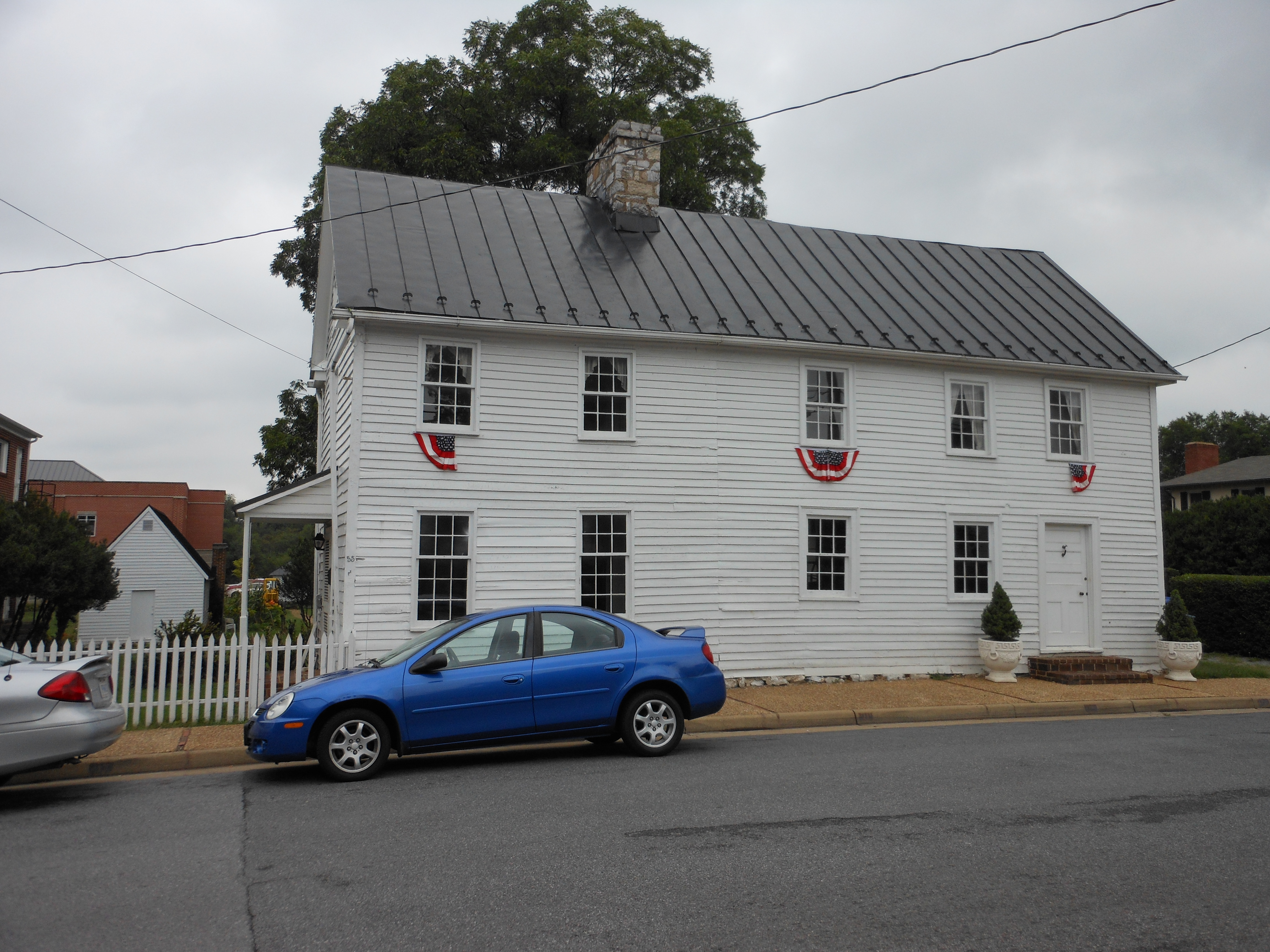
- Balthis House, September 2012

- Location within Shenandoah Valley Location within Northern Virginia Location within Virginia Location within the United States
- Location: 55 Chester St., Front Royal, Virginia
- Coordinates: 38°55′8″N 78°11′27″W
- Area: 0.6 acres (0.24 ha)
- Built: c. 1787
- Architectural style: Federal
- NRHP reference No.: 04000860
- VLR No.: 112-0009

Significant dates
- Added to NRHP: August 11, 2004
- Designated VLR: June 16, 2004

Balthis House, also known as E.C. Balthis Blacksmith Shop Property and Balthis' Old Stand, is a historic home located at Front Royal, Warren County, Virginia. The original section was built about 1787, and is a two-story, five-bay, timber-frame vernacular Federal style dwelling. The original section is three bay. The house was expanded to its present size in the mid-19th century, at the same time as the addition of the two-story brick rear ell. Also on the property are the contributing kitchen dependency and playhouse / gazebo.

The house is now owned by the Warren Heritage Society and is open for tours.

The house was listed on the National Register of Historic Places in 2004. It is located in the Front Royal Historic District.
