= Sonner Hall =

Historic academic building in Virginia, US

- U.S. National Register of Historic Places
- Virginia Landmarks Register
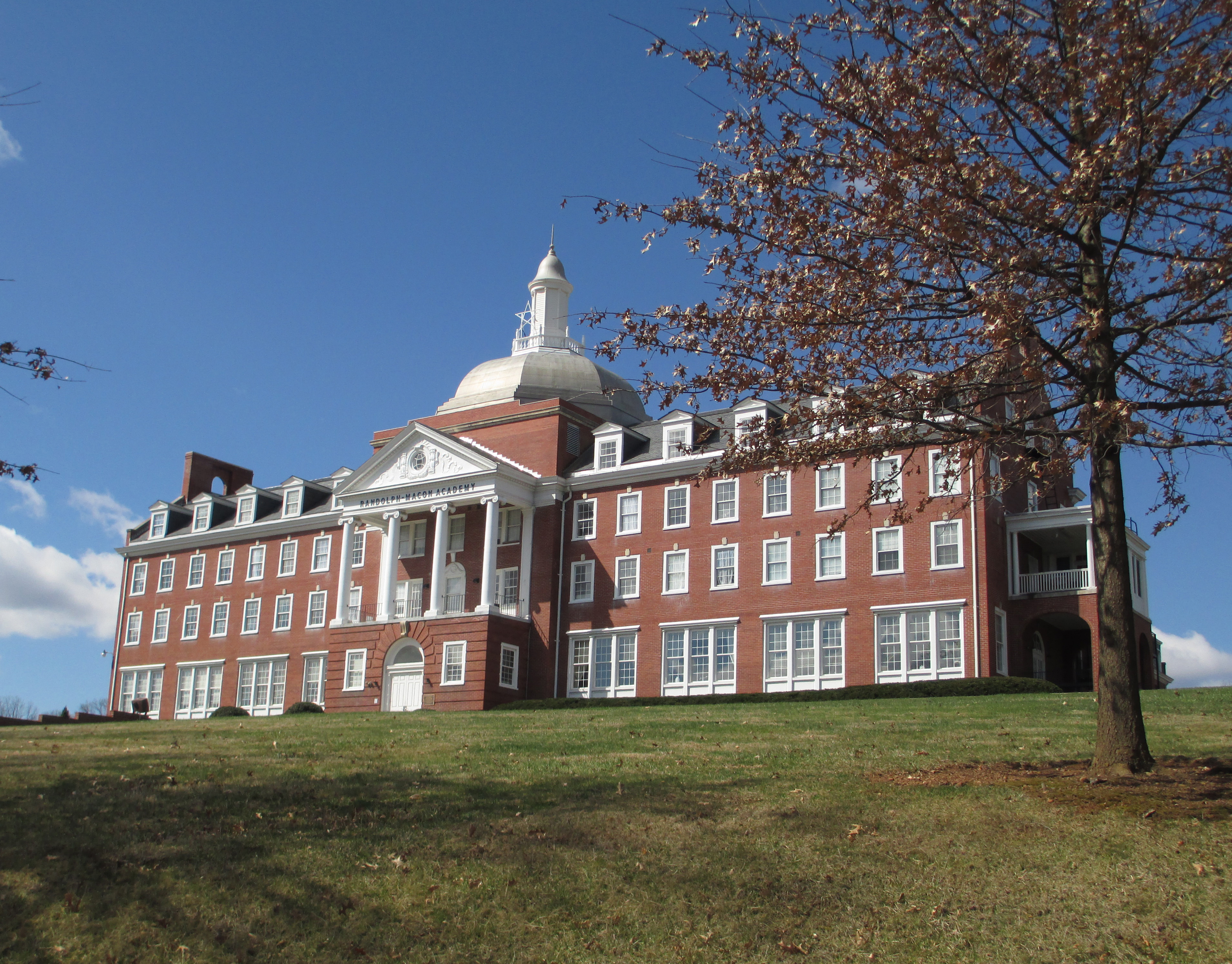
- Sonner Hall in March of 2015.

- Location within Shenandoah Valley Location within Northern Virginia Location within Virginia Location within the United States
- Location: Third St., Front Royal, Virginia
- Coordinates: 38°55′22″N 78°11′55″W
- Area: 1.5 acres (0.61 ha)
- Built: 1927
- Architect: Pettyjohn, J.P.
- Architectural style: Colonial Revival
- NRHP reference No.: 87000007
- VLR No.: 112-0057

Significant dates
- Added to NRHP: January 29, 1987
- Designated VLR: October 14, 1986

Sonner Hall, also known as "Main Building" and Sonner-Payne Hall, is a historic building located at Randolph-Macon Academy in Front Royal, Warren County, Virginia. It was built in 1927, to replace the original academy building of 1892. It is a 3 1/2-story, 19 bay, Colonial Revival style brick building. The front facade features a tetrastyle pedimented portico with Greek Ionic order columns. It has a slate-covered gambrel roof topped by a ribbed dome with a balustrade and lantern. In 1995, a fire destroyed the third and fourth floors of Sonner-Payne Hall. Sonner-Payne Hall was subsequently gutted and rebuilt with improvements.

It was listed on the National Register of Historic Places in 1987.
