= Rose Hill (Front Royal, Virginia) =

Historic house in Virginia, United States

- U.S. National Register of Historic Places
- Virginia Landmarks Register
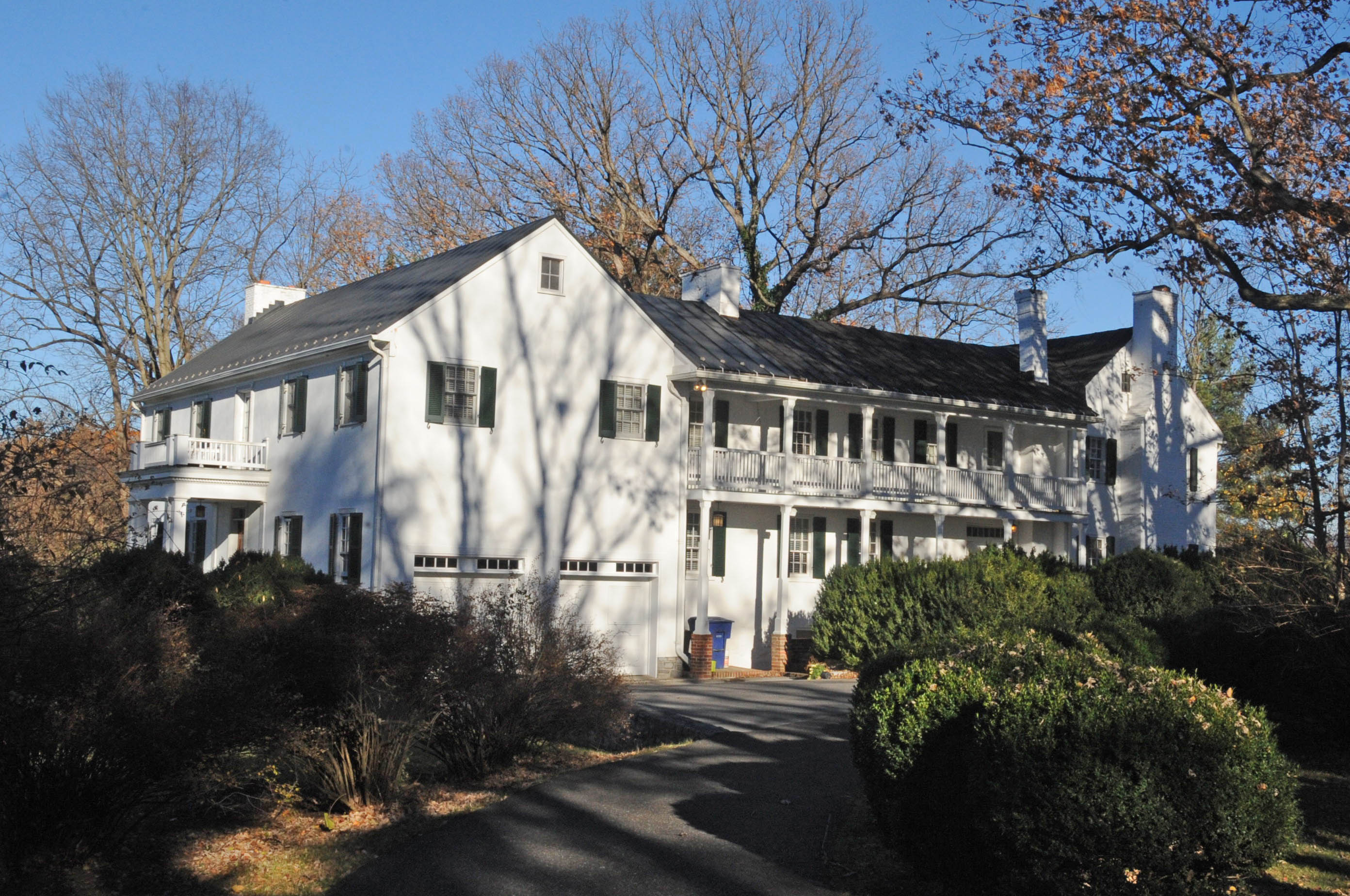

- Location within Shenandoah Valley Location within Northern Virginia Location within Virginia Location within the United States
- Location: 900 block of N. Royal Ave., Front Royal, Virginia
- Coordinates: 38°55′49″N 78°11′43″W
- Area: 8.5 acres (3.4 ha)
- Built: 1830, 1845
- Architectural style: Federal, Greek Revival
- NRHP reference No.: 96000578
- VLR No.: 112-0032

Significant dates
- Added to NRHP: May 23, 1996
- Designated VLR: March 20, 1996

Rose Hill is a historic home located at Front Royal, Warren County, Virginia. The original section was built in 1830, and is a two-story, a central-passage, single-pile plan frame dwelling with vernacular design elements derived from the Federal style. A two-story, brick rear ell with vernacular Greek Revival design elements was added in 1845. The front facade features a one-story, one-bay, hip roofed, Greek-Revival-style porch with paired Doric order wooden columns. Also on the property are the contributing two-story frame cottage, probably built originally as a kitchen/slave quarters, and two frame sheds clad in novelty siding (c. 1937).

It was listed on the National Register of Historic Places in 1996.
