= Mountain Home (Front Royal, Virginia) =

Historic house in Virginia, United States

- Mountain House
- U.S. National Register of Historic Places
- Virginia Landmarks Register
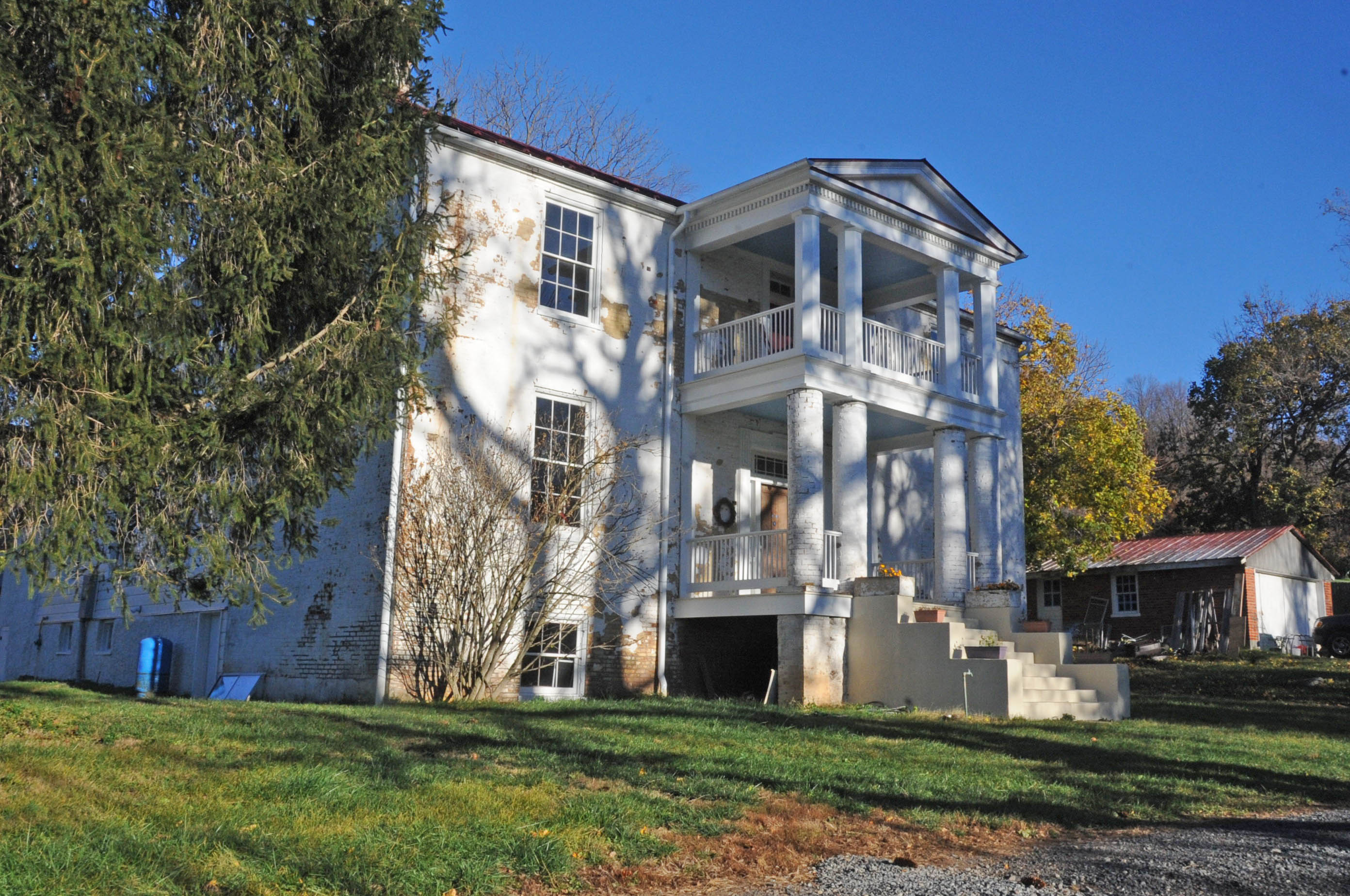

- Location within Shenandoah Valley Location within Northern Virginia Location within Virginia Location within the United States
- Location: 3471 Remount Rd., near Front Royal, Virginia
- Coordinates: 38°52′30″N 78°8′43″W
- Area: 3.7 acres (1.5 ha)
- Built: 1847
- Architectural style: Greek Revival
- NRHP reference No.: 07000801
- VLR No.: 093-0009

Significant dates
- Added to NRHP: August 8, 2007
- Designated VLR: June 6, 2007

Mountain Home is a historic home located near Front Royal, Warren County, Virginia. It was built in 1847, and is a two-story, three-bay, brick Greek Revival style dwelling. It has a two-story frame ell added in 1869. Also on the property are the contributing mid-19th-century slave quarters, a meat house, a chicken coop, a shed, and two early-20th-century garages.

It was listed on the National Register of Historic Places in 2007.

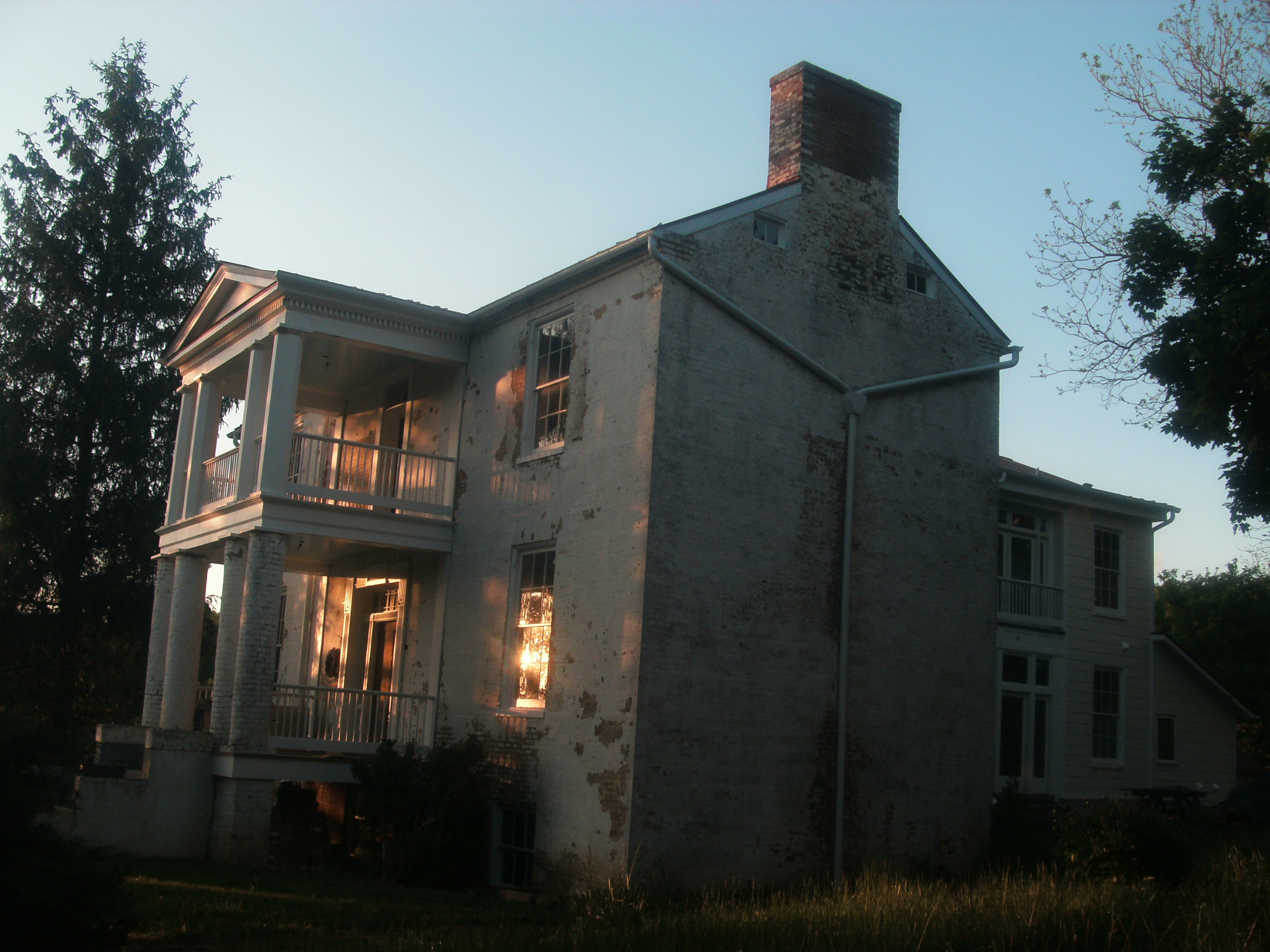
Mountain Home at dusk, May, 2016
