= Fairview Farm =

Historic house in Virginia, United States

- U.S. National Register of Historic Places
- Virginia Landmarks Register
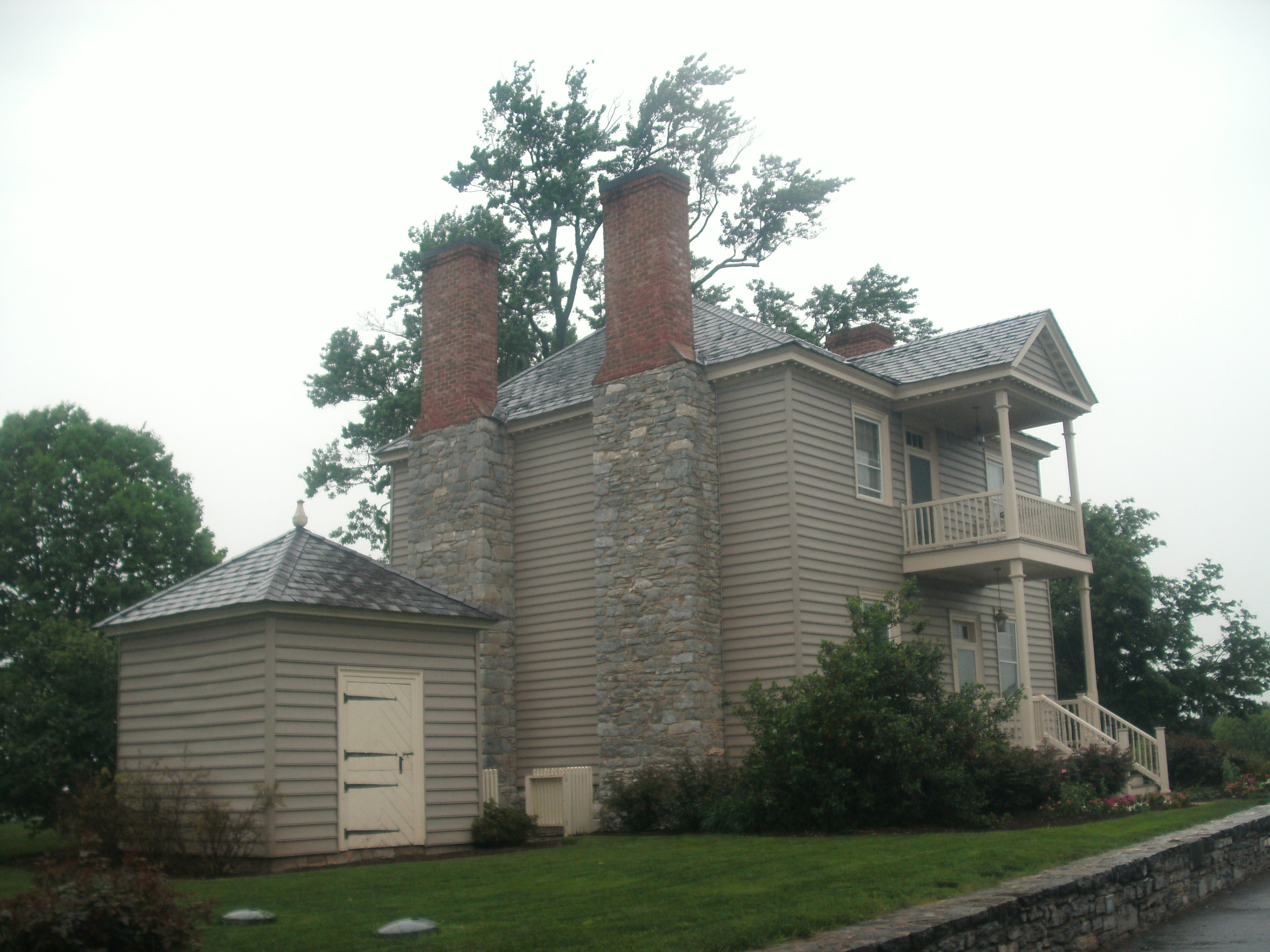
- Fairview seen in May, 2016

- Location within Shenandoah Valley Location within Northern Virginia Location within Virginia Location within the United States
- Location: VA 658, near Front Royal, Virginia
- Coordinates: 38°59′40″N 78°7′53″W
- Area: less than one acre
- NRHP reference No.: 86001249
- VLR No.: 093-0171

Significant dates
- Added to NRHP: June 5, 1986
- Designated VLR: December 17, 1985

Fairview Farm is a historic home located near Front Royal, Warren County, Virginia. It was built during the last quarter of the 18th century, and is a two-story, nearly square, timber frame dwelling. It has a hipped roof and two exterior chimneys. It also has two-story porches rebuilt during the restoration in 1984.

The house is now owned by the Warren Heritage Society.

It was listed on the National Register of Historic Places in 1986.
