= Front Royal Historic District =

Historic district in Virginia, United States

- U.S. National Register of Historic Places
- U.S. Historic district
- Virginia Landmarks Register
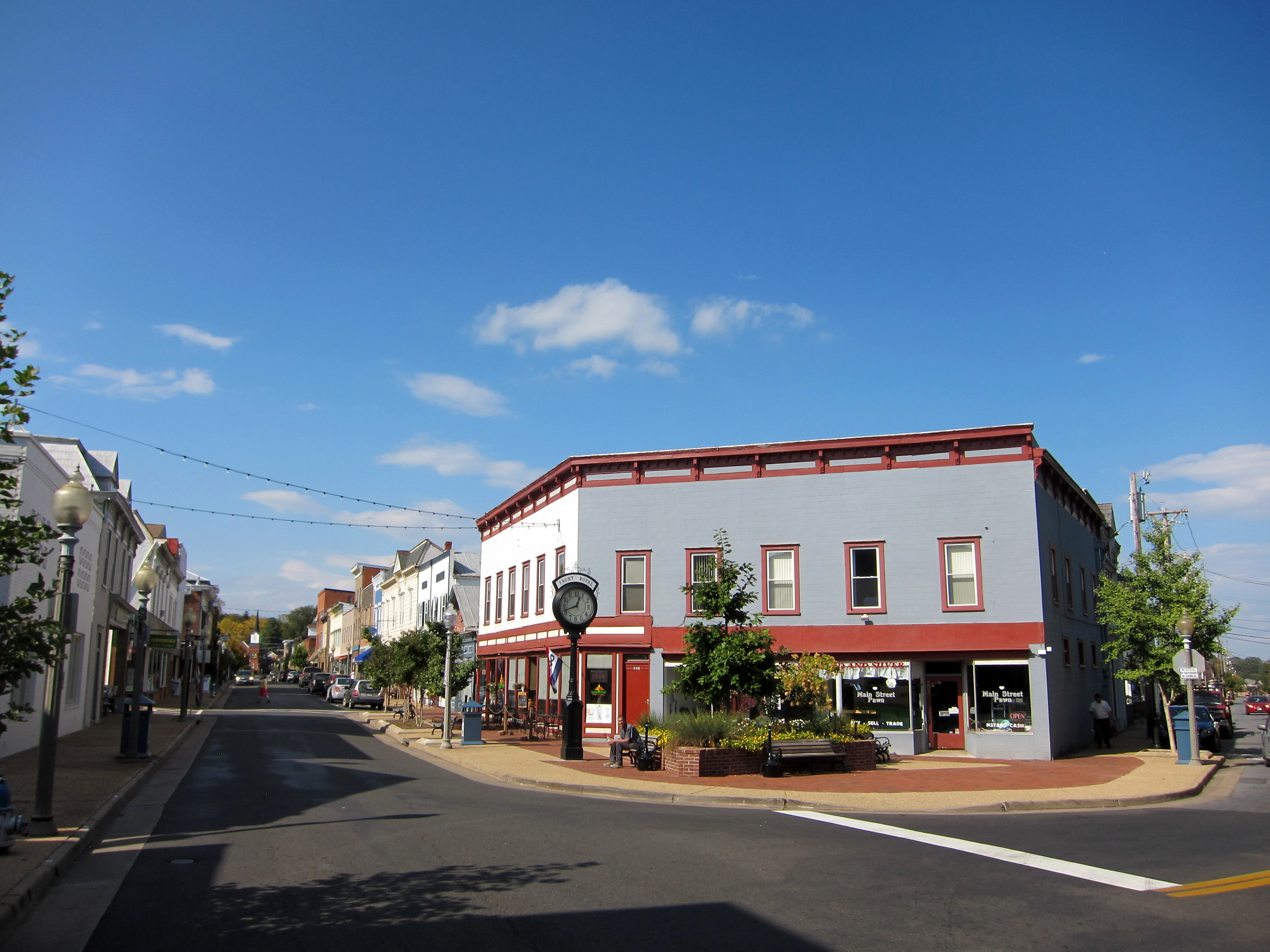
- Main Street in Front Royal

- Location within Shenandoah Valley Location within Northern Virginia Location within Virginia Location within the United States
- Location: Irregular district around E and W Main St., and S Royal Ave., Front Royal, Virginia
- Coordinates: 38°54′57″N 78°11′31″W
- Area: 0 acres (0 ha)
- NRHP reference No.: 03000209
- VLR No.: 112-0055

Significant dates
- Added to NRHP: April 11, 2003
- Designated VLR: December 4, 2002

Front Royal Historic District is a national historic district located at Front Royal, Warren County, Virginia. The district encompasses approximately 470 contributing buildings and structures in the town of Front Royal. It has a mix of commercial, residential, industrial, religious and governmental buildings dating from the late-18th to mid-20th centuries.

Notable buildings include the former Proctor-Biggs Mill (c. 1922), a former apple warehouse, Murphy's Theater (1908-1909), Compton's Corner (c. 1905), first Bank of Warren, Trout Drugstore Building, second Bank of Warren building (1914), Montview Hotel (c. 1868), Park Theater (c. 1920), the Henry Trout House (c. 1800), Mullen-Trout House (c. 1815), Giles-Cooke House (c. 1850), and the Dr. Manly Littleton Garrison (c. 1882). Located in the district and separately listed are the Balthis House and Warren County Courthouse.

It was listed on the National Register of Historic Places in 2003.
