= Front Royal Recreational Park Historic District =

Historic district in Virginia, United States

- U.S. National Register of Historic Places
- U.S. Historic district
- Virginia Landmarks Register
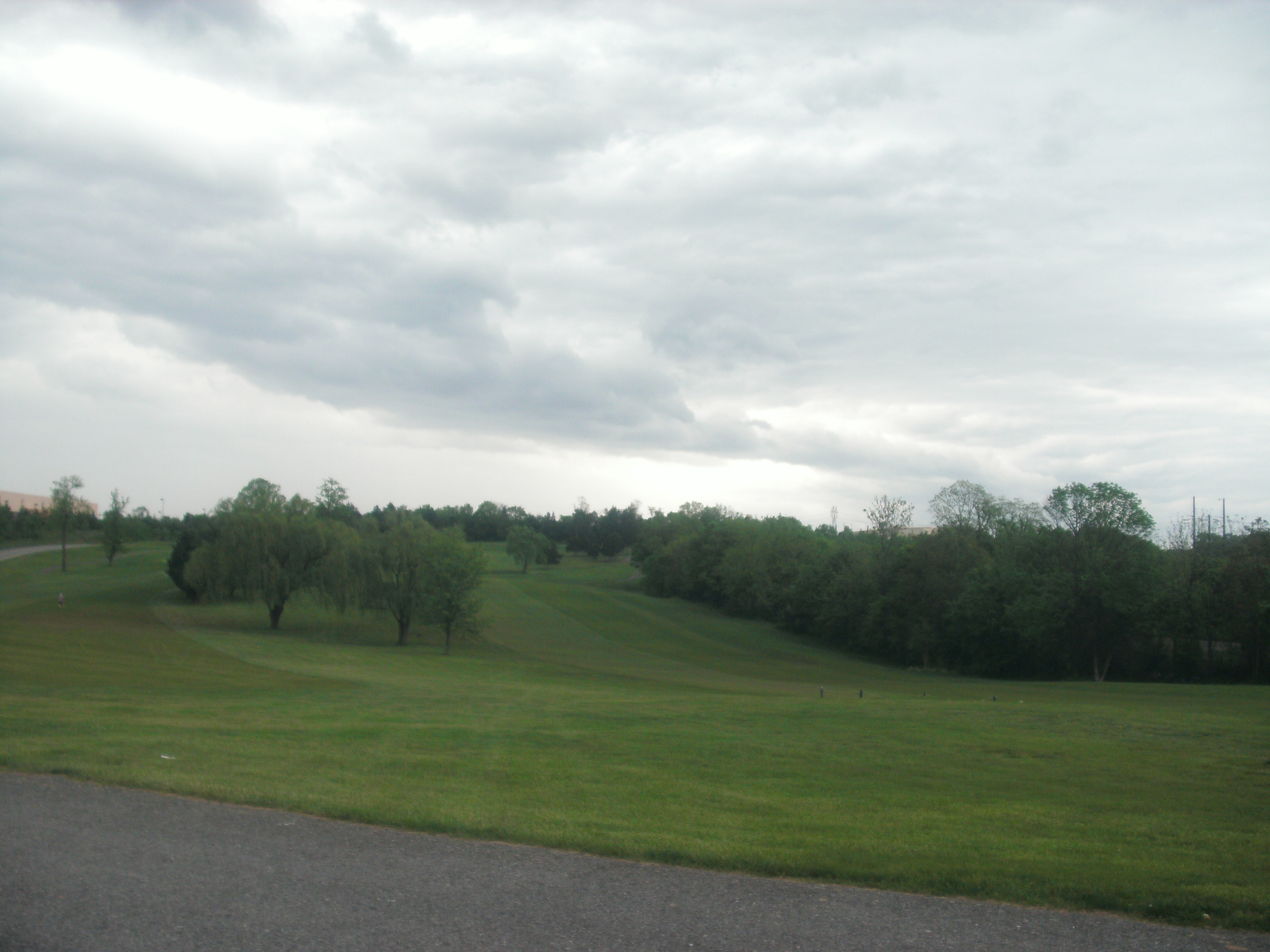
- Greens at the golf course, May, 2016

- Location within Shenandoah Valley Location within Northern Virginia Location within Virginia Location within the United States
- Location: VA 665, 1.1 mi. N of Riverton from VA 522, near Front Royal, Virginia
- Coordinates: 38°57′34″N 78°11′04″W
- Area: 63 acres (25 ha)
- Built: 1938
- Architect: Civilian Conservation Corps
- Architectural style: Late 19th And Early 20th Century American Movements, Rustic
- NRHP reference No.: 91001975
- VLR No.: 093-0063

Significant dates
- Added to NRHP: October 27, 1992
- Designated VLR: August 21, 1991

Front Royal Recreational Park Historic District, also known as the Front Royal Country Club, is a national historic district located near Front Royal, Warren County, Virginia. The district encompasses 3 contributing buildings, 1 contributing site, 3 contributing structures, and 1 contributing object near the town of Front Royal. The park was constructed by the Civilian Conservation Corps in 1938. The historic resources on the property include a garage, and greenskeeper's house, the golf course, the tennis courts, swimming pool, and original shelter, as well as a stone drinking fountain and a stone memorial marker. The property is operated as a public golf course by Warren County. The original clubhouse was lost in the flood of 1996 and rebuilt in 1998.

It was listed on the National Register of Historic Places in 1992.

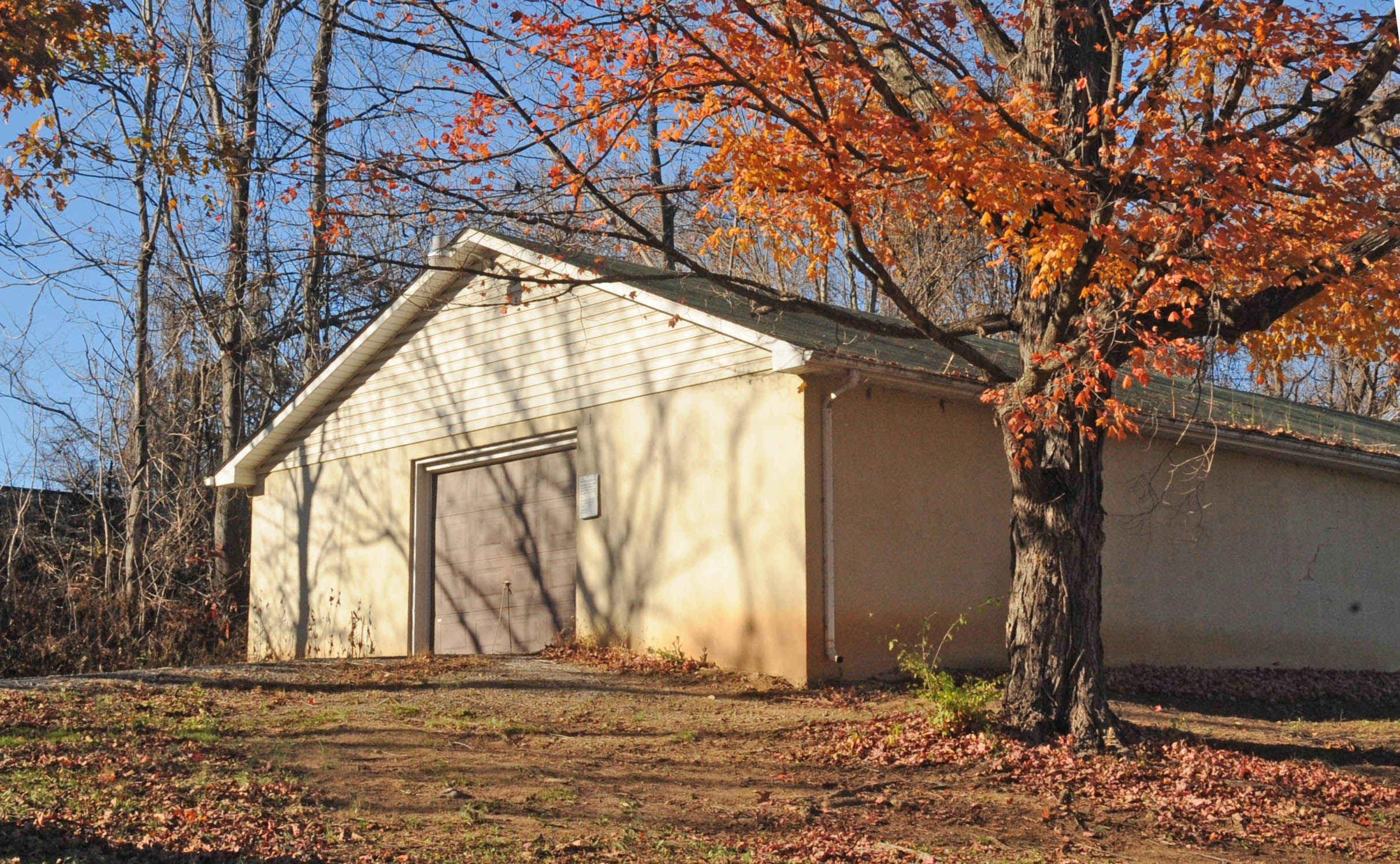
Garage in 2016
