= Flint Run Archeological District =

Archaeological site in Virginia, United States

- U.S. National Register of Historic Places
- U.S. Historic district
- Virginia Landmarks Register
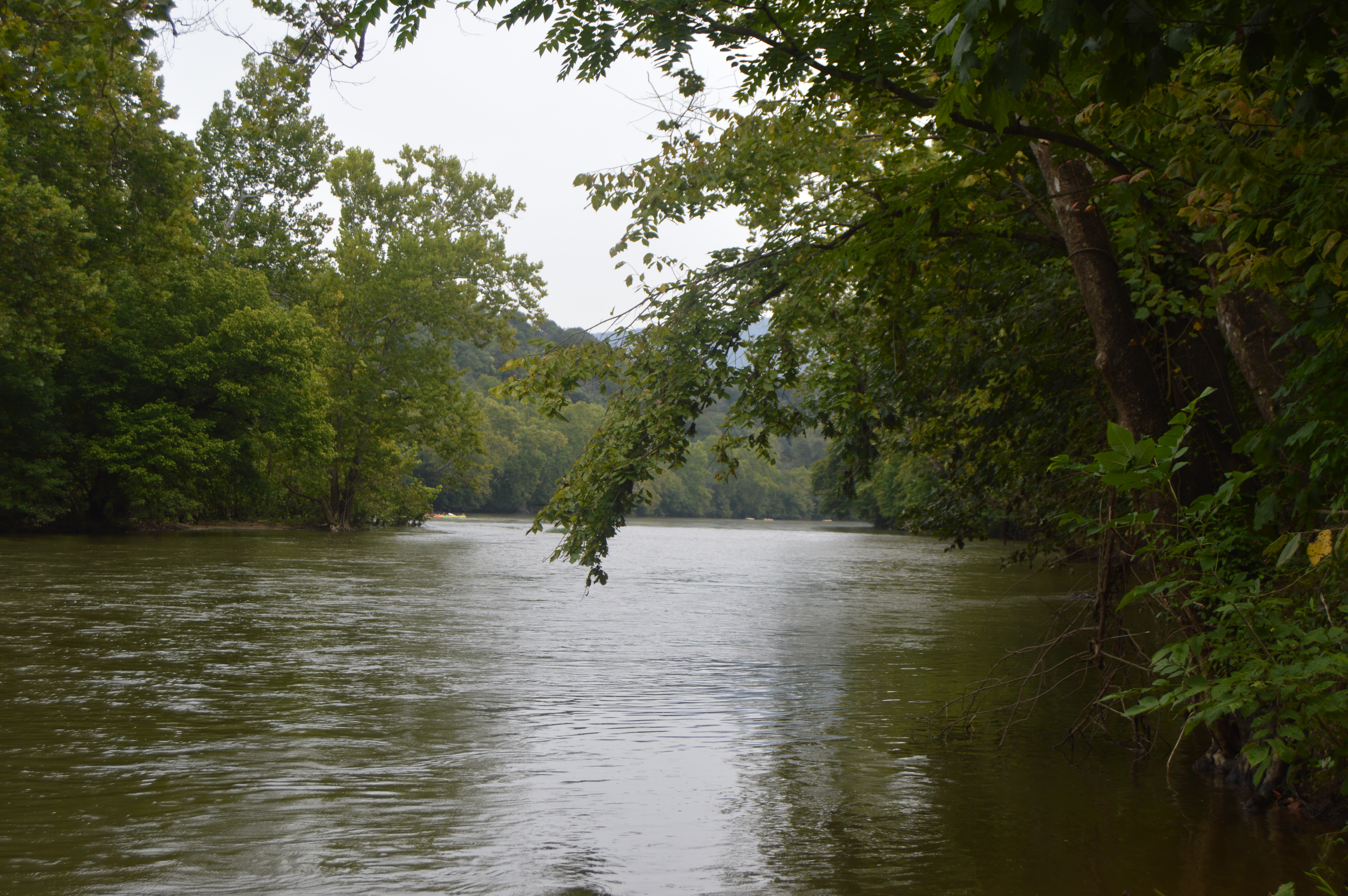
- Shenandoah River in the district
- Nearest city: Front Royal, Virginia
- Area: 1,900 acres (770 ha)
- NRHP reference No.: 76002125
- VLR No.: 093-0165

Significant dates
- Added to NRHP: December 22, 1976
- Designated VLR: December 16, 1975

Flint Run Archeological District, also known as the Flint Run Complex, is a historic archaeological site complex and national historic district located near Front Royal, Warren County, Virginia. The district consists of a group of Clovis sites clustered around a jasper outcrop in the Shenandoah Valley. They relate to a group of between 500 and 1000 people who occupied the site about 8300 BCE. Archaeological excavations reveal habitations and stone tool workshops.

It was listed on the National Register of Historic Places in 1976.
