= Front Royal, Virginia =

Front Royal
- Town
- Town of Front Royal
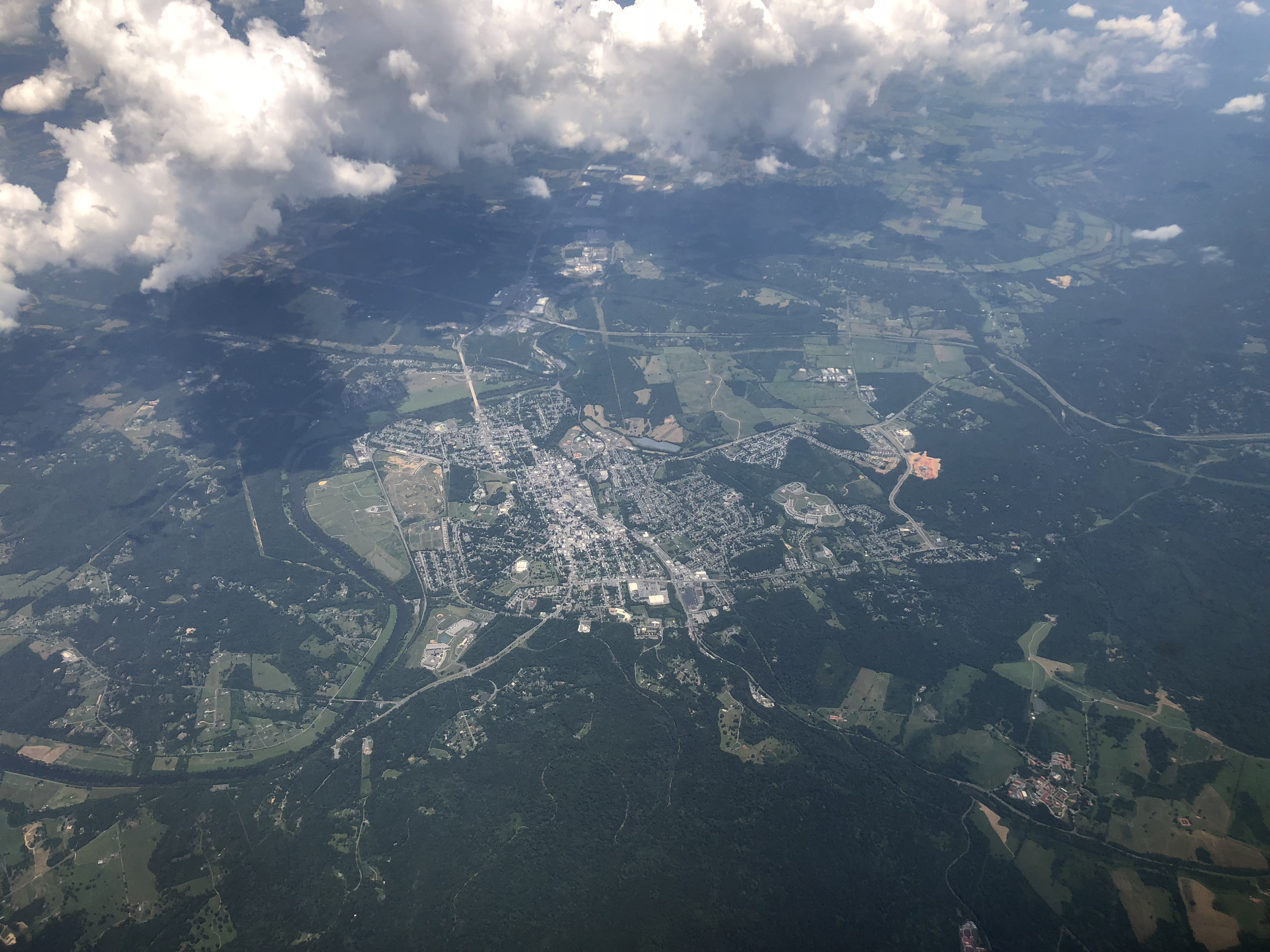
- Aerial view of Front Royal

- Seal Logo
- Nicknames: Canoe Capital of Virginia, Fro Ro, The Royal
- Location within Shenandoah Valley Location within Virginia Location within the United States
- Coordinates: 38°56′N 78°12′W
- Country: United States
- State: Virginia
- County: Warren
- Founded: 1788

Government
  - Mayor: Lori A. Cockrell

Area
  - Total: 10.52 sq mi (27.24 km^{2})
  - Land: 10.27 sq mi (26.61 km^{2})
  - Water: 0.24 sq mi (0.63 km^{2})
- Elevation: 568 ft (173 m)

Population (2020)
  - Total: 15,011
  - Estimate (2023): 15,400
  - Density: 1,430.5/sq mi (552.33/km^{2})
- Time zone: UTC-5 (Eastern (EST))
  - Summer (DST): UTC-4 (EDT)
- ZIP code: 22630
- Area code: 540
- FIPS code: 51-29968
- GNIS feature ID: 1498480
- Website: https://www.frontroyalva.com/

Front Royal is the only incorporated town in Warren County, Virginia, United States. The population was estimated at 15,400 as of 2023. It is the county seat of Warren County.

== History ==
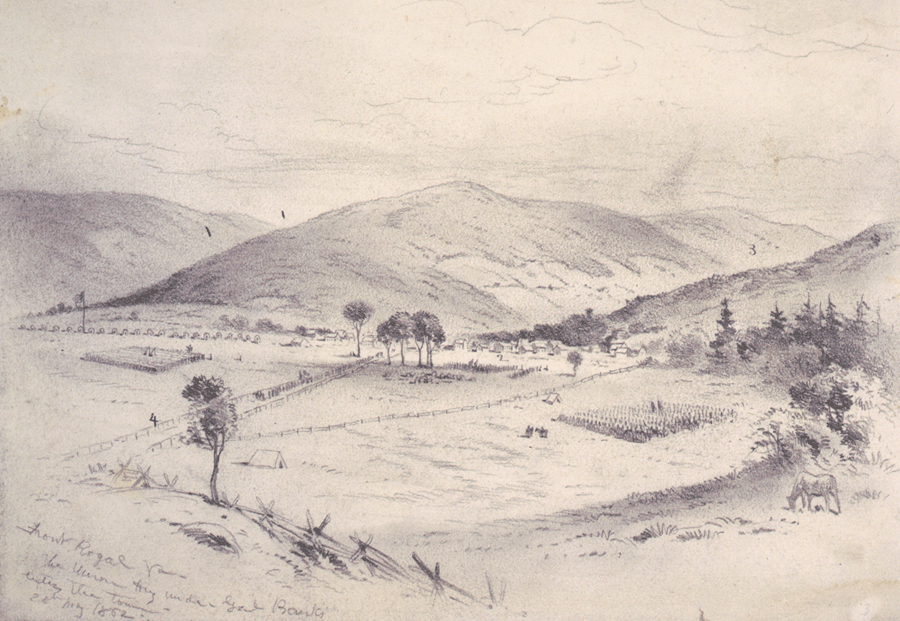
The Battle of Front Royal was fought during the US Civil War

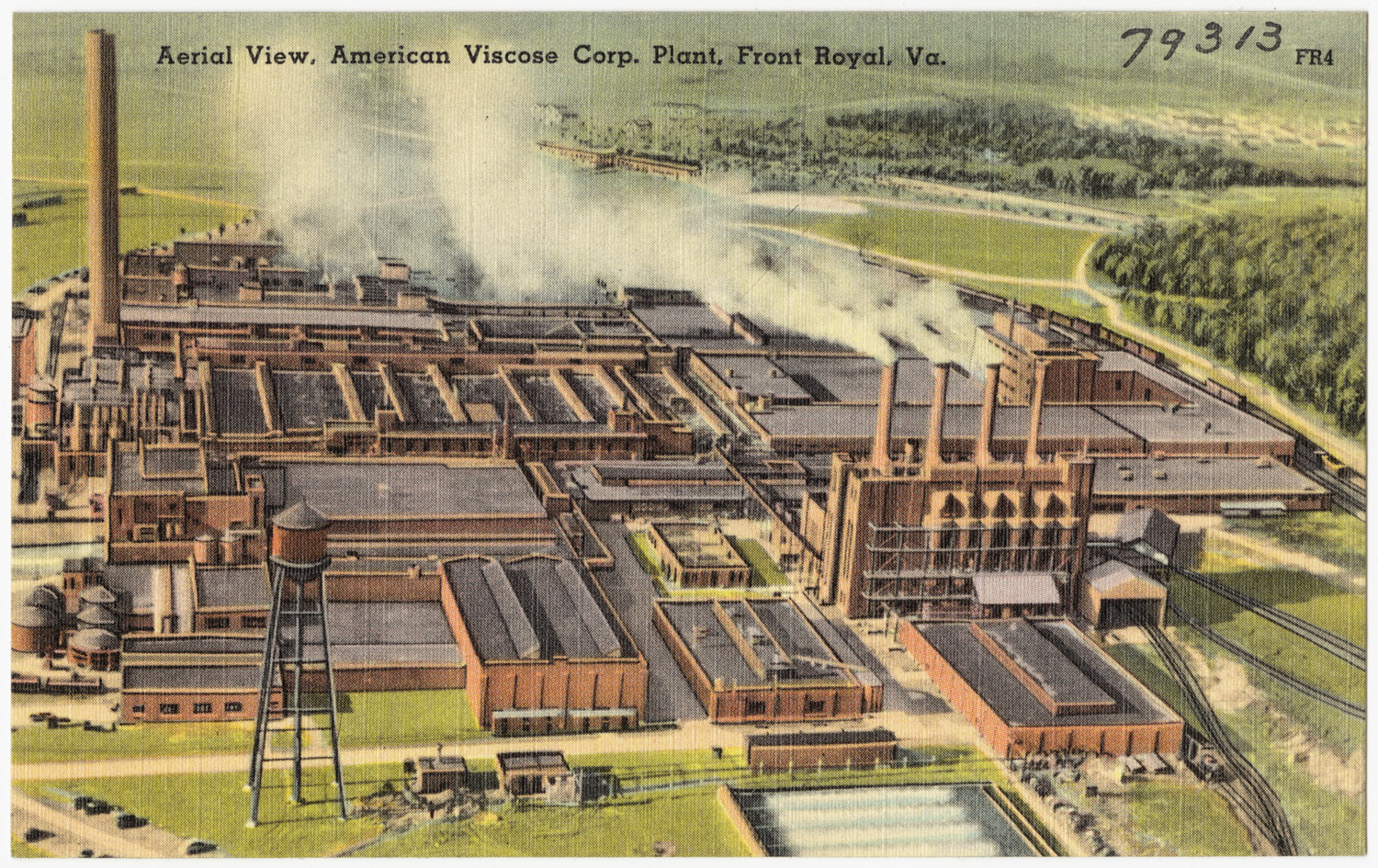
Mid-20th century postcard showing an aerial view of the American Viscose Corporation Plant in Front Royal, Virginia.

The entire Shenandoah Valley including the area to become Front Royal was annexed and claimed for hunting by the Iroquois Confederation during the later Beaver Wars, by 1672. Some bands of the Shawnee settled in the area as client groups to the Iroquois and alternately to the Cherokee after 1721. The Iroquois formally sold their entire claim east of the Alleghenies to the Virginia Colony at the Treaty of Lancaster in 1744. Front Royal, originally settled in 1754, had been known to European explorers as early as the 1670s, and the nearby settlement of Chester's Ferry was in existence by 1736. The town also had a well-known nickname by the 1790s, "Helltown," due to the many livestock wranglers and boatmen on the Shenandoah coming through the area, who came into town looking for alcohol. It was incorporated as "Front Royal" in 1788.

Rail service was established in 1854 with the construction of the Alexandria, Orange and Manassas Gap Railroad between Manassas and Riverton. This line was soon extended to Strasburg in time to become a factor in the Battle of Front Royal on May 23, 1862, and throughout the Civil War. Lumber, agriculture, manufacturing and grain mills provided employment in the region for decades after the Civil War.

The American Viscose rayon plant, once Front Royal's principal employer, with 3,000 workers at its peak, operated between the 1930s and 1989. The plant manufactured rayon for tires during World War II and later produced rayon for rocket nozzles for the Defense Department and the National Aeronautics and Space Administration.

On April 30, 2026 King Charles III of the UK and Queen Camilla visited Front Royal and participated in a parade and a potluck meal. Their visit was meant to honor the people of rural America according to a spokesperson for the British Embassy. "[A big part of America] happens in small towns, so this is an opportunity for their majesty to connect with everyday Americans. This visit is really about honoring all Americans, not just political folks and business leaders. America 250 is for everyone."

=== Etymology ===
Several theories regarding the origins of the name "Front Royal" have been suggested.

A common theory is that the town was named for a giant oak tree – the "Royal" Tree of England – that stood in the public square during colonial days where Chester and Main Streets now join. It was there that the local militia were drilled. During drills, a frequent command given by the drill sergeant was, "front the Royal Oak!" The command was repeated and eventually shortened to simply "Front Royal". This theory is supported by a bulletin published by the United States Geological Survey in 1905, which states that the town was first known as Royal Oak, with the current name being derived from the commands of a confused colonel.

A second account holds that when local militia were stationed around the town during the American Revolution, the sentry would call out "Front", to which the required entry password was to respond "Royal". Eventually their military post became known as "Camp Front Royal".

A third version holds that, in early decades of European settlement, the area was referred to in French as "le front royal", meaning the British frontier. French settlers, trappers, and explorers in the Ohio Country of the mid-18th century were referring to the land grant made by King Charles II, then in control of Thomas, Lord Fairfax, Baron of Cameron. In English, "le front royal" is translated to the "Royal Frontier".

The name was in common usage by 1788, when the town was incorporated as "Front-Royal."

== Geography ==
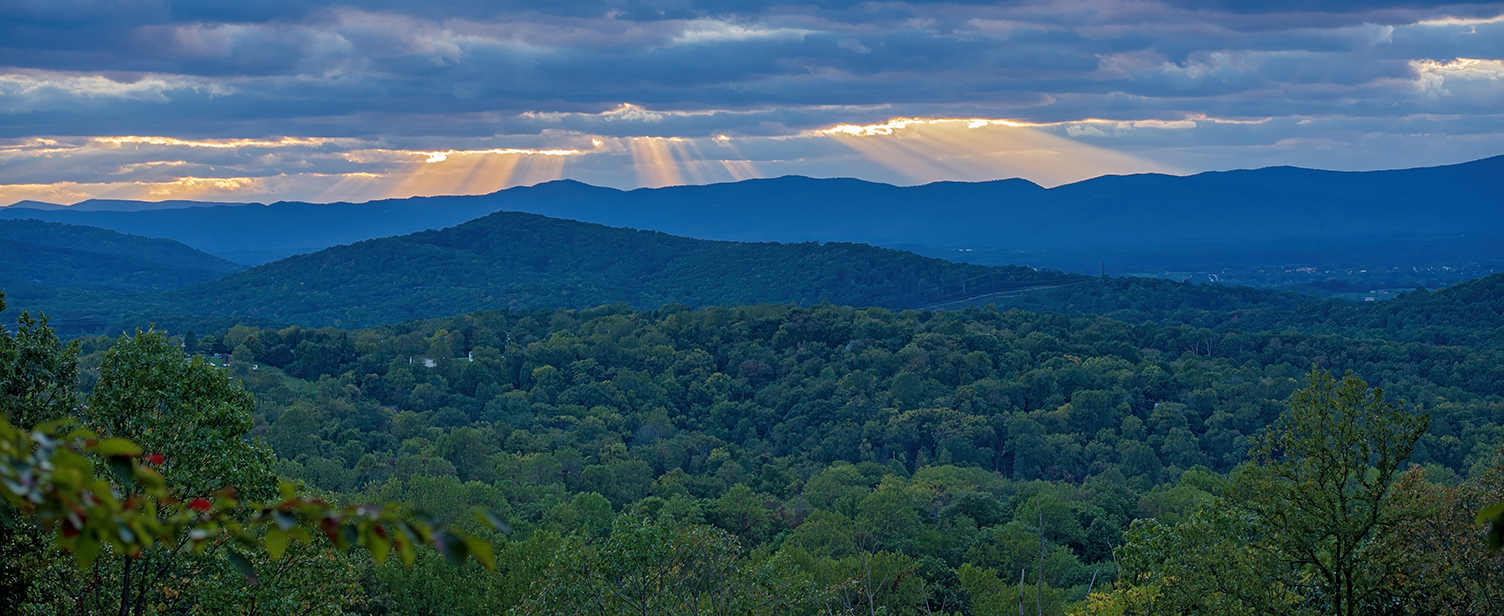
Front Royal, VA

Front Royal is approximately 76 miles (122 km) west of Washington, D.C., 13 miles (21 km) southeast of Middletown, 12.5 (20 km) miles east of Strasburg and 26.3 miles (42.3 km) northeast of Woodstock.

According to the 2010 United States census, the town has a total area of 9.5 square miles (24.6 km^{2}), of which 9.3 square miles (24.1 km^{2}) is land and 0.2 square miles (0.5 km^{2}) (2.52%) is water. In 2014, the town annexed additional land, increasing the town's total land area to 10.5 square miles (27.2 km^{2}).

Front Royal is located at the confluence of the North and South Forks of the Shenandoah River.

=== Climate ===
Front Royal experiences a humid subtropical climate, with summer highs in the low to mid 80s and winter lows in the upper 20s. Front Royal averages 43 inches of precipitation per year, with 24 inches of snowfall per year.

Climate data for Front Royal, Virginia (1991–2020 normals, extremes 1995–present)
Month	Jan	Feb	Mar	Apr	May	Jun	Jul	Aug	Sep	Oct	Nov	Dec	Year
Record high °F (°C)	75 (24)	81 (27)	88 (31)	94 (34)	98 (37)	101 (38)	104 (40)	100 (38)	99 (37)	93 (34)	86 (30)	81 (27)	104 (40)
Mean daily maximum °F (°C)	43.0 (6.1)	46.5 (8.1)	54.3 (12.4)	66.6 (19.2)	74.3 (23.5)	82.3 (27.9)	86.7 (30.4)	84.6 (29.2)	77.8 (25.4)	67.3 (19.6)	56.0 (13.3)	46.8 (8.2)	65.5 (18.6)
Daily mean °F (°C)	33.6 (0.9)	36.1 (2.3)	43.4 (6.3)	54.5 (12.5)	62.8 (17.1)	71.2 (21.8)	75.4 (24.1)	73.5 (23.1)	66.7 (19.3)	56.1 (13.4)	45.5 (7.5)	37.4 (3.0)	54.7 (12.6)
Mean daily minimum °F (°C)	24.1 (−4.4)	25.7 (−3.5)	32.5 (0.3)	42.5 (5.8)	51.3 (10.7)	60.0 (15.6)	64.1 (17.8)	62.4 (16.9)	55.6 (13.1)	44.9 (7.2)	35.1 (1.7)	28.1 (−2.2)	43.9 (6.6)
Record low °F (°C)	−4 (−20)	−2 (−19)	3 (−16)	17 (−8)	28 (−2)	43 (6)	49 (9)	47 (8)	37 (3)	23 (−5)	14 (−10)	5 (−15)	−4 (−20)
Average precipitation inches (mm)	2.85 (72)	2.45 (62)	3.77 (96)	3.41 (87)	4.36 (111)	4.49 (114)	3.57 (91)	3.96 (101)	4.76 (121)	3.35 (85)	3.29 (84)	3.11 (79)	43.37 (1,103)
Average snowfall inches (cm)	4.7 (12)	9.4 (24)	2.2 (5.6)	0.0 (0.0)	0.0 (0.0)	0.0 (0.0)	0.0 (0.0)	0.0 (0.0)	0.0 (0.0)	0.0 (0.0)	0.0 (0.0)	4.8 (12)	21.1 (54)
Average precipitation days (≥ 0.01 in)	9.6	8.3	10.0	11.3	13.5	11.7	10.7	10.6	8.9	8.3	7.8	9.0	119.7
Average snowy days (≥ 0.1 in)	2.5	2.4	1.0	0.0	0.0	0.0	0.0	0.0	0.0	0.0	0.0	1.6	7.5
Source: NOAA

== Demographics ==
Historical population
Census	Pop.	Note	%±
1850	504		—
1860	807		60.1%
1870	705		−12.6%
1880	829		17.6%
1890	868		4.7%
1900	1,005		15.8%
1910	1,133		12.7%
1920	1,404		23.9%
1930	2,424		72.6%
1940	3,831		58.0%
1950	8,115		111.8%
1960	7,949		−2.0%
1970	8,211		3.3%
1980	11,126		35.5%
1990	11,880		6.8%
2000	13,589		14.4%
2010	14,440		6.3%
2020	15,011		4.0%
U.S. Decennial Census

=== 2020 census ===
As of the 2020 census, Front Royal had a population of 15,011. The median age was 39.6 years. 23.6% of residents were under the age of 18 and 18.2% of residents were 65 years of age or older. For every 100 females there were 92.5 males, and for every 100 females age 18 and over there were 87.5 males age 18 and over.

98.4% of residents lived in urban areas, while 1.6% lived in rural areas.

There were 5,905 households in Front Royal, of which 31.2% had children under the age of 18 living in them. Of all households, 38.5% were married-couple households, 20.6% were households with a male householder and no spouse or partner present, and 32.6% were households with a female householder and no spouse or partner present. About 29.8% of all households were made up of individuals and 13.4% had someone living alone who was 65 years of age or older.

There were 6,328 housing units, of which 6.7% were vacant. The homeowner vacancy rate was 1.9% and the rental vacancy rate was 5.8%.

Racial composition as of the 2020 census
Race	Number	Percent
White	11,871	79.1%
Black or African American	1,193	7.9%
American Indian and Alaska Native	90	0.6%
Asian	212	1.4%
Native Hawaiian and Other Pacific Islander	4	0.0%
Some other race	447	3.0%
Two or more races	1,194	8.0%
Hispanic or Latino (of any race)	1,048	7.0%

=== 2000 census ===
As of the census of 2000, there were 13,589 people, 5,425 households, and 3,585 families residing in the town. The population density was 1,464.9 people per square mile (565.6 people/km^{2}). There were 5,752 housing units at an average density of 620.1 units per square mile (239.4 units/km^{2}). The racial makeup of the town was 88.31% White, 8.68% African American, 0.28% Native American, 0.63% Asian, 0.04% Pacific Islander, 0.66% from other races, and 1.40% from two or more races. Hispanic or Latino of any race were 2.13% of the population.

There were 5,425 households, out of which 32.2% had children under the age of 18 living with them, 46.8% were married couples living together, 14.1% had a female householder with no husband present, and 33.9% were non-families. 28.9% of all households were made up of individuals, and 12.5% had someone living alone who was 65 years of age or older. The average household size was 2.46 and the average family size was 3.01.

In the town, the population was spread out, with 25.7% under the age of 18, 8.2% from 18 to 24, 28.7% from 25 to 44, 22.8% from 45 to 64, and 14.6% who were 65 years of age or older. The median age was 37 years. For every 100 females, there were 89.9 males. For every 100 females age 18 and over, there were 86.0 males.

The median income for a household in the town was $34,786, and the median income for a family was $42,675. Males had a median income of $32,373 versus $24,182 for females. The per capita income for the town was $17,901. About 9.1% of families and 14.8% of the population were below the poverty line, including 15.2% of those under age 18 and 13.2% of those age 65 or over.

== Economy ==
The Front Royal Economic Development Authority is appointed by the town council to execute various civic and economic development activities funded by Virginia state bonds for these purposes. Major private-sector employers include a paint factory owned by Axalta Coating Systems and a foam factory owned by Toray Plastics (America), the US subsidiary of Toray Industries.

== Arts and culture ==
=== Attractions ===
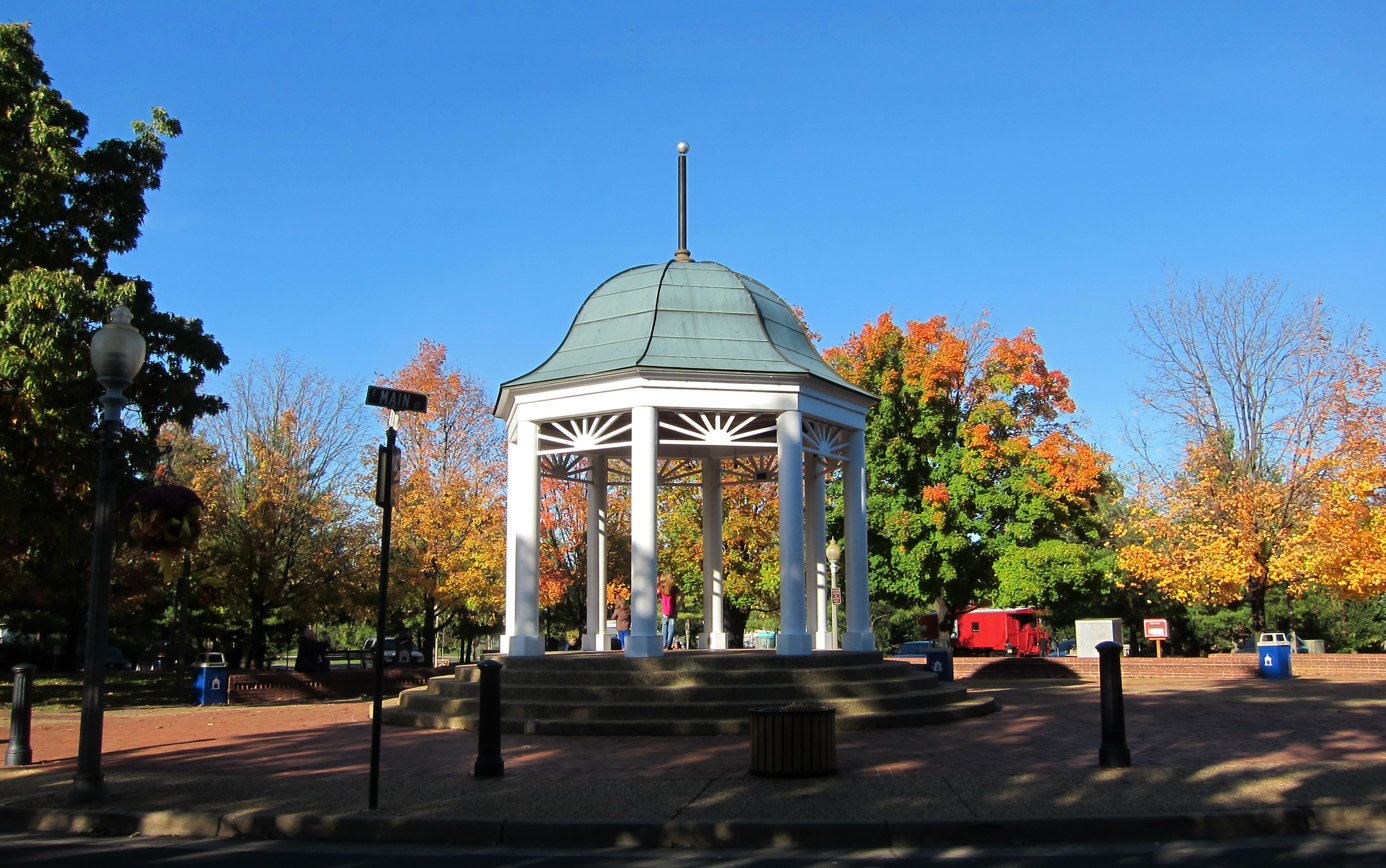
The gazebo at the Village Commons in Front Royal

Front Royal is the home of Randolph-Macon Academy (founded 1892). Front Royal is also the home of Christendom College and the Smithsonian Conservation Biology Institute (SCBI). Along with these institutions are the two rival high schools, Skyline High School and Warren County High School.

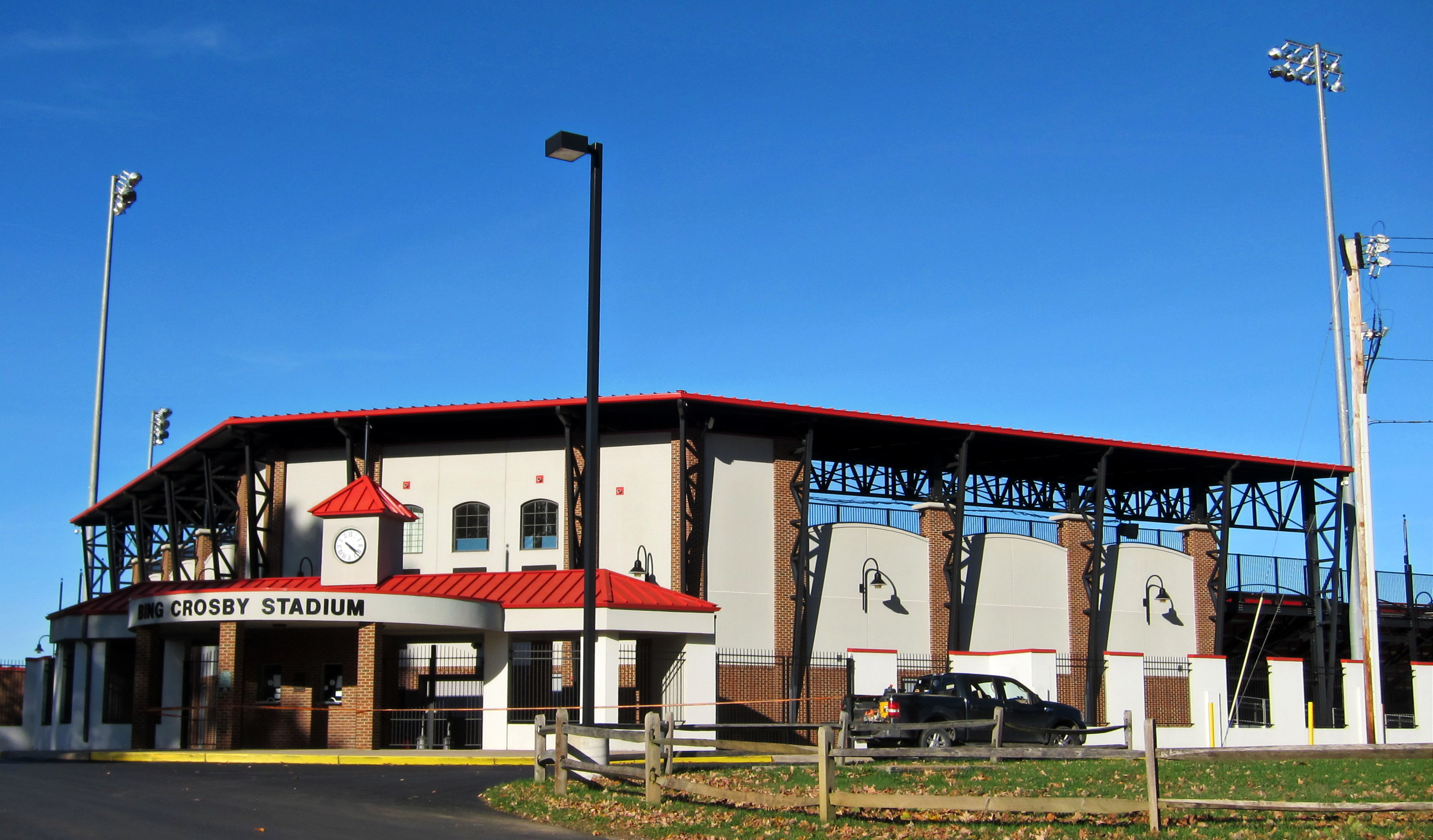
Bing Crosby Stadium

The town also hosts the 440-acre (1.8 km^{2}) Avtex Fibers Superfund Site. Once Virginia's largest Superfund site, remediation activities at this former rayon manufacturing facility have been ongoing since 1989. The site is intended to eventually house a 175-acre (0.71 km^{2}) eco-friendly office park, 30 acres (120,000 m^{2}) of soccer fields, and 240 acres (0.97 km^{2}) of conservancy park along the Shenandoah River. The plant, which was built by the American Viscose Corporation in the 1930s and at one time employed nearly 3,500 workers, was closed in 1989 after being cited for more than 2,000 environmental violations over five years, including emissions of polychlorinated biphenyls (PCBs) into the Shenandoah River. The plant's main buildings were demolished in 1997 as part of the cleanup.

The U.S. Customs and Border Protection's Canine Center Front Royal is located in Front Royal. This facility has trained dogs and their handlers in various detection abilities for federal and law enforcement agencies since 1974.

The Front Royal Cardinals baseball team joined the Valley League in 1984. Games are played in Bing Crosby Stadium. Bing Crosby helped raise funds for the building of the original stadium by arranging for his film Riding High to have its world premiere in Front Royal on April 1, 1950. Crosby's initial involvement came about on April 30, 1948, when after acting as grand marshal of the Grand Feature Parade of the 21st. Shenandoah Apple Blossom Festival in Winchester, Virginia, he went on to Front Royal where he sang on the courthouse steps as part of a concert to help raise money for a new stadium. Bing was the first contributor to the Front Royal Recreation Center Building Fund when he donated $1,000. On April 1, 1950, Front Royal celebrated "Bing Crosby Day" and starting at 11 a.m., Crosby led a two-hour parade through the streets in front of a crowd of 20,000 to Recreation Park for the dedication of the baseball stadium. Park Theater was the venue for the official world premiere of Riding High at 8:30 p.m. where Crosby entertained the audience with several songs. During his appearance at the Park Theater, Bing wrote out a personal check for $3,595 to bring the gross receipts of the day to $15,000.

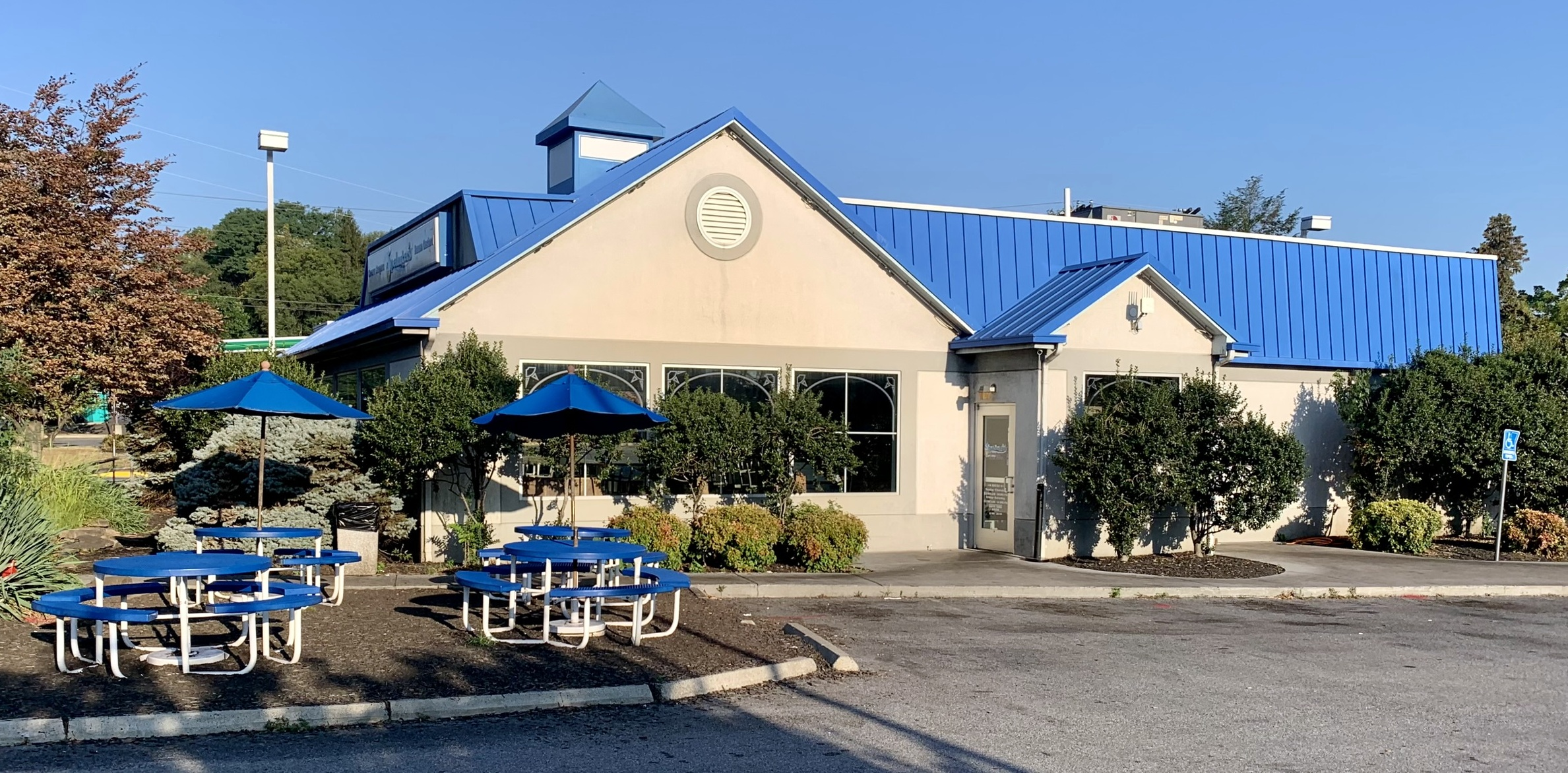
Spelunker's Frozen Custard & Cavern Burgers on South Street

In 1953, Frank Nesbitt coached a Little League team from Front Royal which came in 3rd in the world tournament. Freddie Moore was one of the players on that team, and later became active in Front Royal Little League. After Moore died of cancer one of Front Royal's Little League fields was named in his honor.

The Confederate Museum on Chester Street has many interesting artifacts from the 1860s, as have the museum buildings of the Warren Heritage Society, the Ivy Lodge (c. 1859), the Belle Boyd Cottage (c. 1836) and the Balthis House (c. 1788).

Front Royal was designated the "Canoe Capital of Virginia" in February 1999.

=== National Register of Historic Places ===
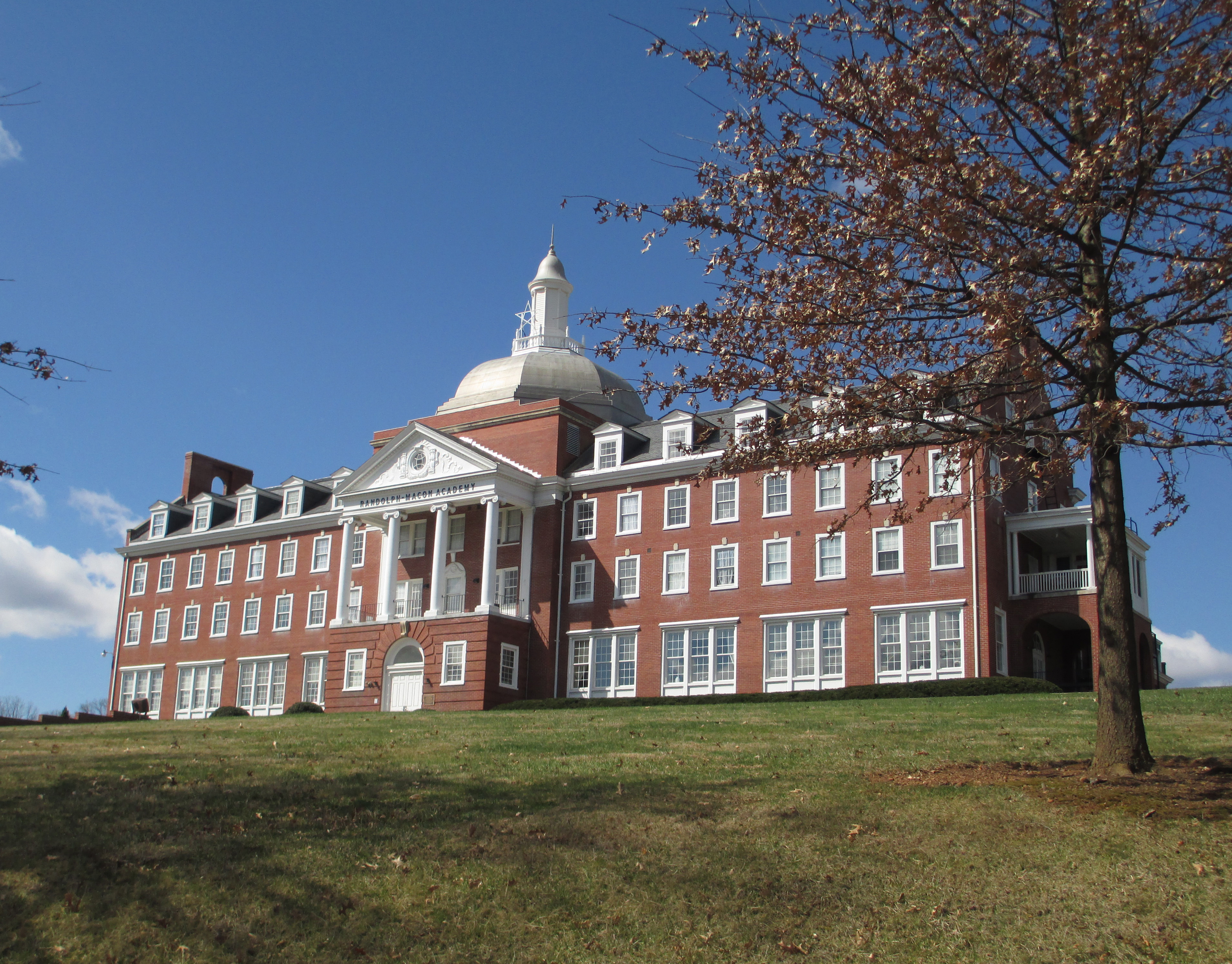
Sonner Hall at Randolph-Macon Academy is listed on the National Register of Historic Places.

Within Front Royal, the following buildings, properties and districts are listed on the National Register of Historic Places:

- Balthis House
- Erin
- Fairview Farm
- Flint Run Archeological District
- Front Royal Historic District
- Front Royal Recreational Park Historic District
- Killahevlin
- Mountain Home
- Riverside
- Riverton Historic District
- Rose Hill
- Sonner Hall
- Warren County Courthouse

== Government ==
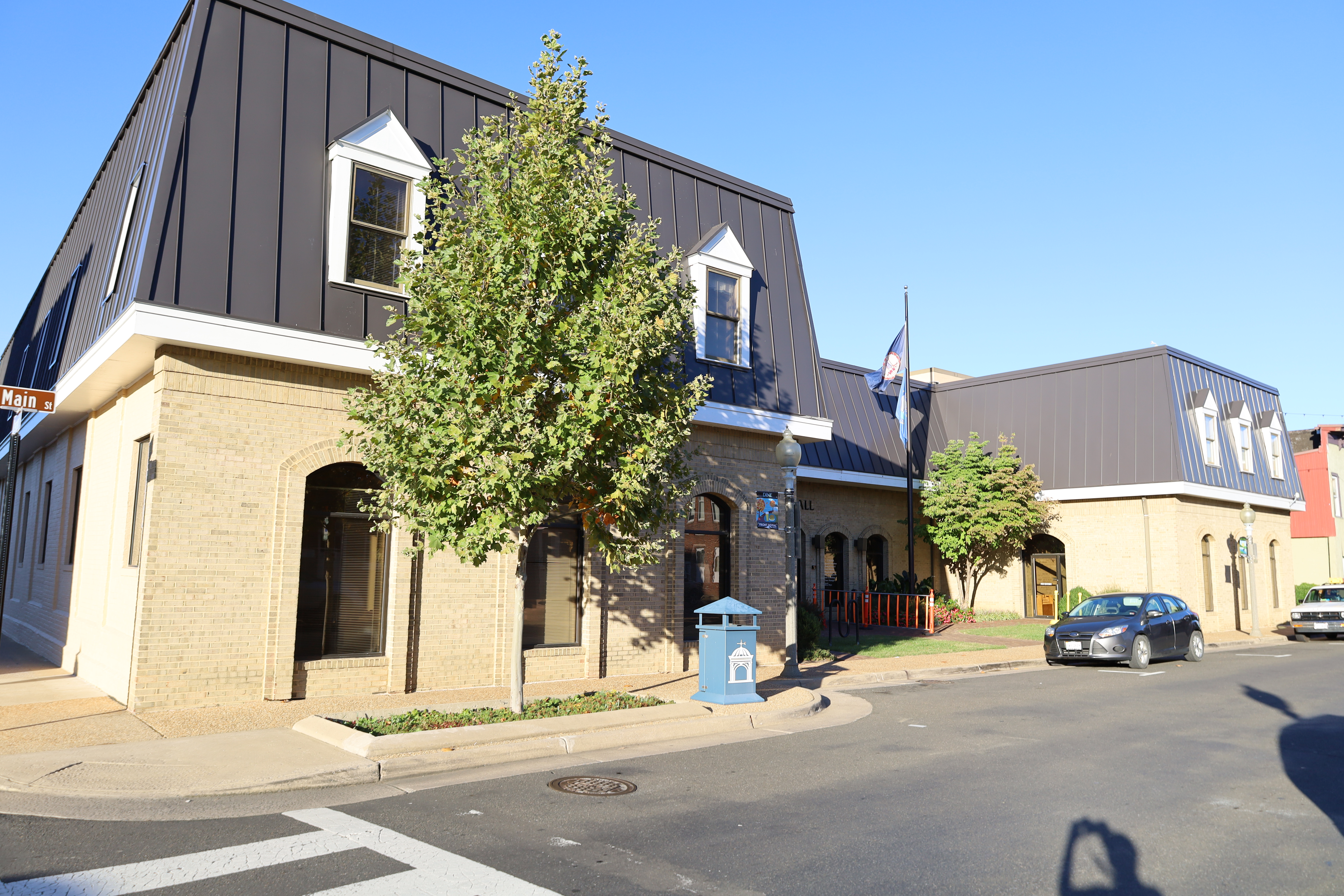
Front Royal Town Hall

The mayor and town council are Front Royal's elected officials. The mayor is Lori Cockrell, and members of the town council are Glenn Wood, Bruce Rappaport, Joshua Ingram, Wayne Sealock, Melissa DeDemonico-Payne, and Vice-Mayor Amber Veitenthal

== Education ==
The Samuels Public Library is the town's public library. Its history goes back to 1799 as Virginia's second subscription library, in 1836 it was formed as the Front Royal Library Society, Bernard Samuels donated a building in 1952, and its current building opened to the public in 2009.

=== Primary and secondary schools ===
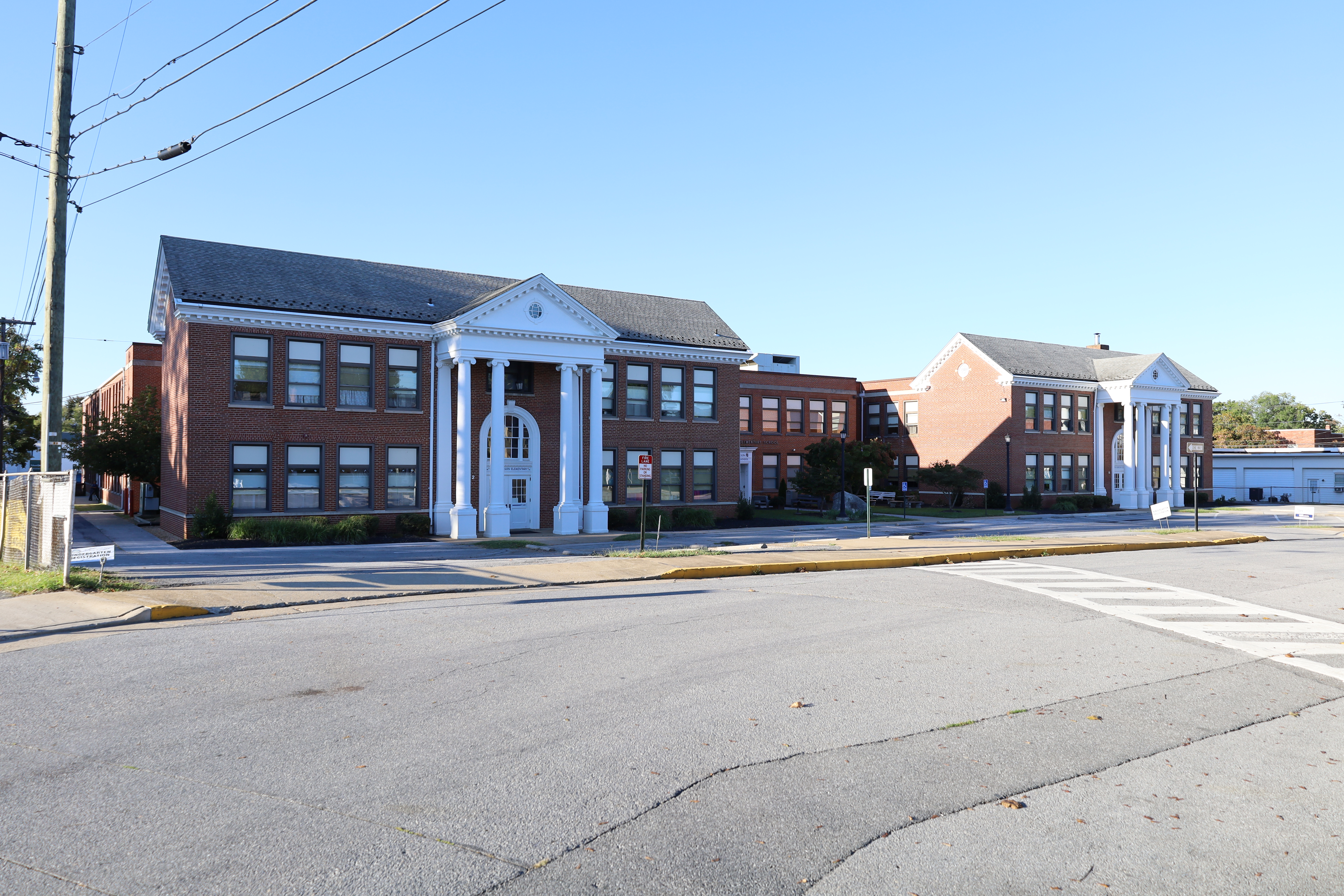
E.W. Morrison Elementary School

- Mountain Laurel Montessori School
- A.S. Rhodes Elementary School
- Blue Ridge Technical Center
- E.W. Morrison Elementary School
- Hilda J. Barbour Elementary School
- Leslie Fox Keyser Elementary School
- Ressie Jeffries Elementary School
- Skyline Middle School
- Warren County Middle School
- Brighter Futures Learning Community
- Mountain Vista Governor's School
- Skyline High School
- Warren County High School
- John XXIII Montessori Center
- Chelsea Academy (grades K-12)
- Randolph-Macon Academy (grades 6–12)
- Divinum Auxilium Academy (grades preschool-6)
- St. Edith Stein School for Girls (grades 7–12)
- St. Joseph the Just School for Boys (grades 7–12)
- John Paul the Great Montessori Academy (grades K-12)

=== Colleges and universities ===
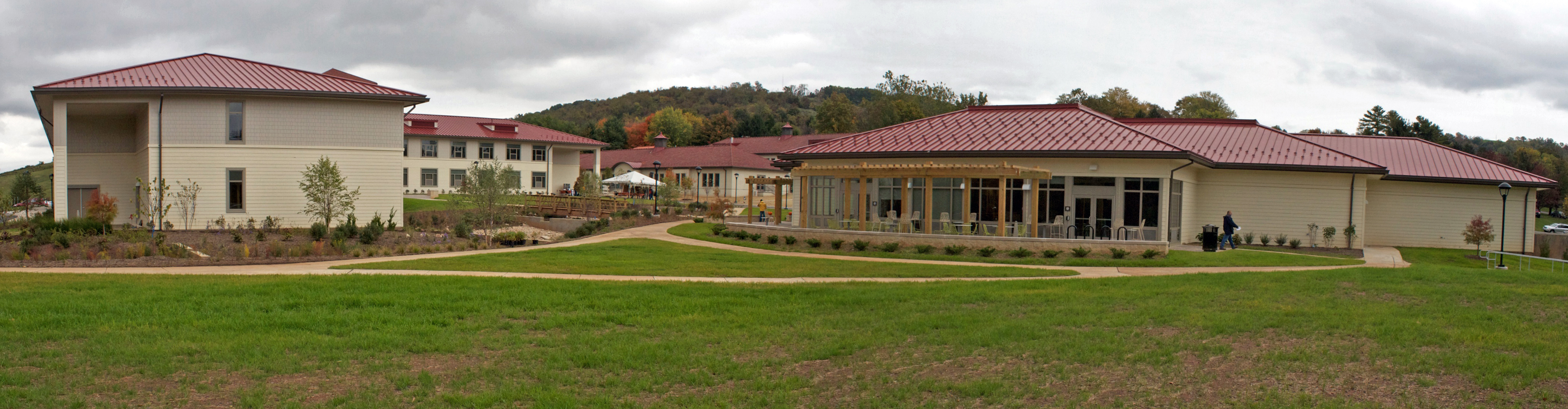
Smithsonian-Mason School of Conservation

- Smithsonian-Mason School of Conservation
- Christendom College

== Media ==
Three radio stations and two weekly newspapers are based and licensed to Front Royal.

On radio, FM stations WZRV and WFQX are licensed to the town. WZRV is actually based in Front Royal, while WFQX is based in nearby Winchester. Also, on radio, AM station WFTR is based and licensed to the town.

The Northern Virginia Daily is a daily newspaper serving the area. Weekly newspapers The Sherando Times and The Warren County Report are based in Front Royal. The Warren County Report serves Warren County, while The Sherando Times serves the Stephens City, Middletown, and Kernstown areas of nearby Frederick County, Virginia. The Warren Sentinel is the county's oldest newspaper, dating back over 150 years. It is published each Thursday.

== Infrastructure ==
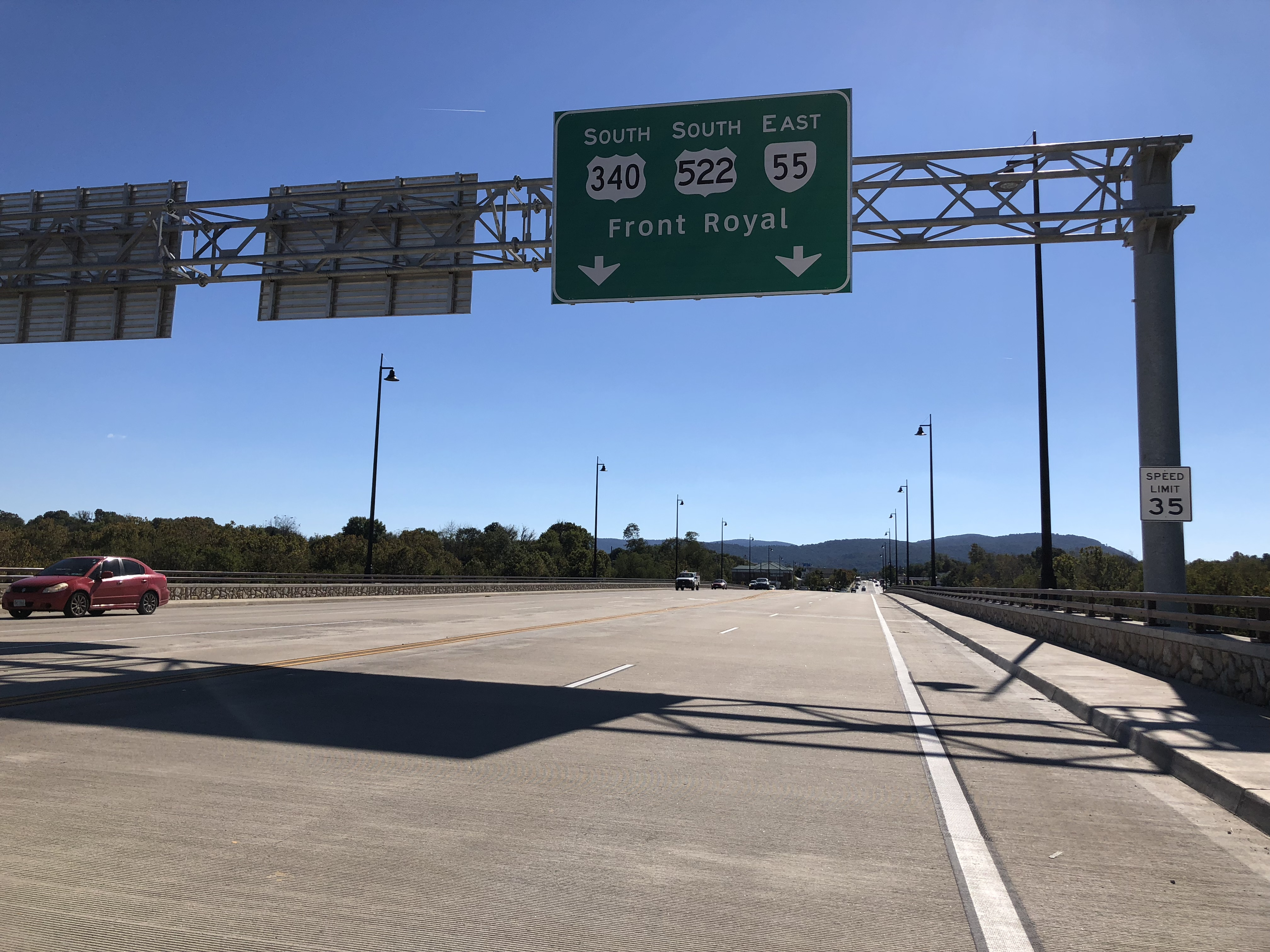
View south along US 340/522 and east along SR 55 in Front Royal

=== Transportation ===
Front Royal is located at the intersection of US 340 and US 522. SR 55 also passes through Front Royal. I-66 passes just north of Front Royal.

It also contains the Virginia Inland Port, a U.S. Customs-designated port of entry, situated on U.S. Route 522.

Virginia Regional Transit operates the Front Royal Trolley, which provides local bus service.

Ride Smart Northern Shenandoah Valley provides commuter bus service between Front Royal and the DC area.

The state-operated Virginia Breeze intercity bus provides service between Blacksburg and DC and stops in Front Royal.

== In popular culture ==
In James Axler's Deathlands series, central protagonist Ryan Cawdor is a native of Front Royal and visits the town several times throughout the series.

== Notable people ==
- Dana Allison, professional baseball player.
- Howard Klein, pianist and former music critic for The New York Times
- J. Hillis Miller Sr., fourth president of the University of Florida.
- W. K. Stratton, actor in the TV series Black Sheep Squadron.
- Darrell Whitmore, professional baseball player.
