= Federal City Council =

American not-for-profit organization

- Formation: September 13, 1954; 72 years ago
- Founder: Phil Graham; Francis Addison, Jr.
- Founded at: Washington, D.C., U.S.
- Tax ID no.: 53-0219643
- Legal status: 501(c)(3) nonprofit organization
- Purpose: Planning and economic development
- Headquarters: 1156 15th Street NW, Washington, D.C. 20005
- Members: More than 230 (2012)
- President: Thomas M. Davis
- Chairman, board of directors: Marty Rodgers
- Chief Executive Officer, executive director: Former Mayor Anthony A. Williams
- Revenue: $2,562,075 (2015)
- Expenses: $2,379,375 (2015)
- Employees: 16 (2014)
- Volunteers: 230 (2014)
- Website: www.federalcitycouncil.org

Federal City Council is a 501(c)(3) nonprofit organization that promotes economic development in the city of Washington, D.C., in the United States. Incorporated on September 13, 1954, it is one of the most powerful private groups in the city, and is highly influential in Congress. It was the primary backer of a wide range of important projects, including the construction of the Washington Metro subway system, the city's first and second convention centers, the Ronald Reagan Building and International Trade Center, and the Verizon Center. It has also been successful in pushing for changes in the District of Columbia Public Schools, reform of the federal role in the District of Columbia's finances, and reform of the District's tax structure.

The association, whose members are largely drawn from the business community, prefers to work behind the scenes and avoid media attention. It is highly influential, although assessments of its influence in the past decade have varied. The organization has also created a number of independent nonprofits and subsidiary bodies, which have worked on range of issues, from the D.C Policy Center and the Washington Housing Conservancy, to waterway restoration to crime.

== History ==
=== Founding and early issues ===
The Federal City Council was incorporated on September 13, 1954, "to develop, stimulate and encourage civic leadership in community development in the National Capitol". Phil Graham, co-owner and publisher of The Washington Post, was the major force in creating the council. Graham was deeply concerned about the decline of the District of Columbia in the post-World War II period and the city's rapid loss of population and business to suburbs in Maryland and Virginia. Graham was also worried that the Southwest Washington urban renewal project, authorized in 1946 and funded in 1949, would be cancelled, ending the city's best chance at turning itself around. In 1952, Graham held a meeting of like-minded top businessmen in the boardroom of Riggs Bank to discuss formation of an organization to counteract these trends. These discussions led to formation of the Federal City Council in 1954. Membership was largely limited to businesspeople, because the group felt that only private sector money and a business-like approach to development and management could improve the District. Among the original members of the group in 1954 were Graham and Francis Addison, Jr., president of Security Bank and former president of the Washington Board of Trade. George A. Garrett, a former ambassador, was elected the organization's first president on November 16. A fundamental concept which the group agreed upon early in its history was to work behind the scenes and only on projects that can shape the city for 20 years or more.

The Federal City Council was active in a wide range of issues in the 1950s, including slum clearance, and is credited with successfully lobbying the Eisenhower administration to expedite the razing of much of Southwest Washington (Note: The Federal City Council has also been criticized for pursuing the wholesale demolition of Southwest D.C. As reporter Michael Powell of The Washington Post put it in 1998: "If there was a distant trigger for the homicides that now beset Washington, many criminologists and activists locate it in this huge dislocation. The destruction of neighborhoods and the grouping of thousands of poor families in isolated public housing at a time of social unrest fed a growing alienation and violence.") It was also involved in an attempt to locate the headquarters of the Central Intelligence Agency in the District of Columbia, urban planning, demolition of the temporary Main Navy and Munitions Buildings on the National Mall, the site of the proposed D.C. Cultural Center, and the size of the federal payment made to the city in lieu of property taxes. It was particularly active on the Theodore Roosevelt Bridge issue. It pushed hard for a bridge rather than a tunnel, and, once a bridge had been chosen, for the bridge's location to be about 800 feet (240 m) upstream from the final location.

=== 1960s: Pushing big economic projects ===
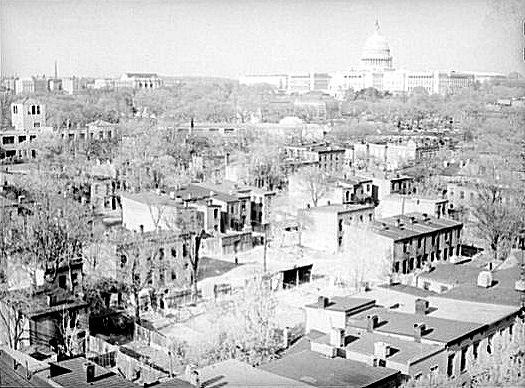
Wholesale demolition of the slums in Southwest D.C. (depicted) was a key goal of the Federal City Council.

Urban planning and the federal contribution to the city's budget continued to occupy some of the Federal City Council's agenda in the early 1960s. But big economic development projects moved to center stage for the organization. It unsuccessfully pushed for a "Federal City Center" (a vast complex of government office buildings akin to Federal Triangle) in 1960. The organization also pushed hard for construction of the D.C. Cultural Center, even though it lost the battle to erect the auditorium at L'Enfant Plaza.

It was far more successful in opposing cancellation of the Southwest Washington urban renewal project, which called for razing nearly all buildings in that quadrant of the city and constructing a new urban center. Although the Federal City Council's specific plans were not adopted, it was deeply involved in the planning process and its studies often relied on by Congress. The Federal City Council even raised money to develop its own concepts for redeveloping downtown and Southwest D.C., and lobbied Congress to have its plans adopted. In 1962, it won adoption of its proposal in the House of Representatives. When the bill died in the Senate at the end of the 87th Congress, it went to the Senate and won passage there in 1963. When the 1963 legislation moved to the House, Representatives John Dowdy and John L. McMillan attached a number of riders to the bill that required competitive bidding, forced federal agencies to give displaced businesses priority in receiving federal assistance, required the Department of Housing and Urban Development (HUD) to develop plans for relocating low-income residents, and placed limits on the number of redevelopment projects that could be approved or constructed at any given time. But many liberals in Congress as well as HUD Secretary Robert C. Weaver opposed these riders. The riders were enacted into law. Unwilling to see redevelopment of Southwest D.C. collapse, the Federal City Council agreed to sponsor legislation that would authorize the Redevelopment Land Agency (RLA, the federal bureau overseeing the reconstruction of Southwest D.C.) to conduct redevelopment on the same basis as federal agencies in other cities. Although this meant ignoring the Federal City Council's plans for redevelopment, it allowed the RLA to begin acting quickly and decisively on redevelopment projects.

Two of the major projects the Federal City Council pushed for in the 1960s were Inner Loop highway system and its associated Three Sisters Bridge, and the Washington Metro subway system. The Inner Loop was strongly opposed by local citizens, who felt it was unnecessary, destroyed many neighborhoods, and despoiled the environment. However, Representative William Natcher, chairman of the Subcommittee on Appropriations for the District of Columbia of the House Committee on Appropriations, was not only a strong advocate of bridge and highway construction but also convinced that construction of the Inner Loop was essential to the growth of the District of Columbia. The Federal City Council, too, advocated the Inner Loop as a response to the flight of retail and light industry for the suburbs (a trend which began in the 1950s). The organization believed that quick and easy automobile access to the city (with much inexpensive parking) would draw shoppers and retailers back. A large subway system was equally important, as the Federal City Council concluded that surface transit alone could not meet the needs of the rapidly growing D.C. metropolitan area. The organization pushed hard for construction of Metro even though Representative Natcher threatened to cancel the subway project if the Inner Loop was not constructed. The organization also wished to ensure that wealthier suburbanites would be able to reach the downtown D.C. shopping district, in the hopes this would reverse or at least stop the flight of retail out of the city.

As part of its Inner Loop push, the Federal City Council asked the City Commission to "nationalize" all parking the city. This was a major step, for it meant government ownership of all parking lots, parking garages, and valet parking lots in the city. The Washington Parking Association, a trade association of parking lot owners, strongly opposed the move. Although the City Commission was willing to pass nationalization legislation, there was extensive opposition in Congress (which had the power to overturn any city law), and the measure died.

Other, smaller projects with the Federal City Council worked on during the 1960s included another attempt to get rid of the "tempos" on the National Mall, construction of a "national aquarium" in East Potomac Park, and a major boost in police to create a "war on crime".

The agenda of the Federal City Council could also work against democracy in the District of Columbia. During the 1960s, there was an increasingly strong push for District of Columbia home rule. Because it supported the vested interests of the status quo, the Federal City Council strongly opposed home rule. It opposed initiatives supported by home rule activists, and often proposed and pushed for the adoption of plans that home rule advocates opposed. In order to win support for its proposals, the Federal City Council raised money to re-elect members of the powerful House Committee on the District of Columbia—most of whom also opposed home rule, as it significantly reduced their power in Congress.

=== 1970s: Focus on economic development ===
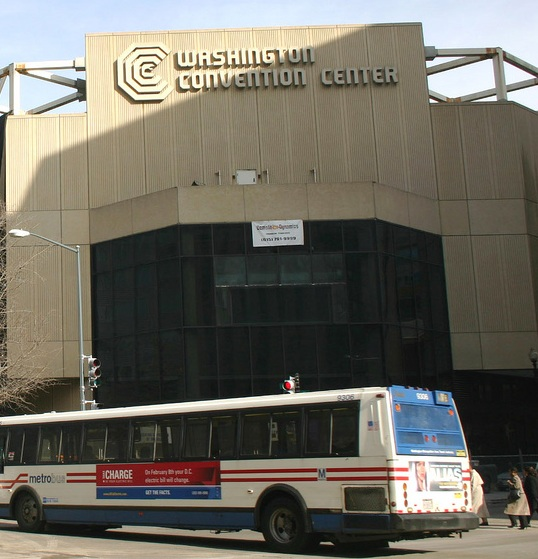
The Federal City Council successfully pushed for construction of D.C.'s first convention center.

Although portions of the Inner Loop were constructed, the majority of highways that comprised the system (including the elements most destructive of neighborhoods and the environment) were cancelled by federal court decisions and by changes in national transportation policy during the late 1960s and the early 1970s. The Three Sisters Bridge project was killed in the House of Representatives in early December 1971. With the Inner Loop dead, the Federal City Council continued to push for city-owned parking and for full funding of the Metro system.

With federal funds for massive infrastructure development dwindling fast in the early 1970s, the Federal City Council turned its focus to smaller projects that would spur economic development. One of its key issues was the construction of a Dwight D. Eisenhower Convention Center to make the city attractive to large trade association conventions. The push for a convention center began in 1973. Although there was extensive opposition in Congress at first, the Federal City Council lobbied hard for federal approval. This was finally given in 1978. The Washington Convention Center finally opened in December 1982. The Federal City Council also backed a "D.C. Building Corporation" to assist developers in obtaining financing for major projects, and pushed the city to create an economic development strategic plan.

As part of its economic redevelopment initiative, the Federal City Council also sought to repeal rent control laws in the District of Columbia. Rent control, the organization argued, discouraged new housing from being built in the city and retarded the city's economic growth. The city's rent control law, enacted in 1975, was seen as vulnerable by the Federal City Council in 1975 and 1976, as few residents had seen its benefits and did not yet support it. Its repeal attempt was unsuccessful, however.

The Federal City Council also began unsuccessfully pushing in the late 1970s for a regional economic planning board similar to the urban planning body it had pressed for in the 1950s.

=== 1980s: The trade center, crime, and schools ===
In the 1980s, the Federal City Council backed two plans—one to reduce flights at Washington National Airport and another to redevelop Buzzard Point—at the opening and close of the decade. Neither plan was implemented. It also released a study in 1980 criticizing the District government for allowing significant deterioration in the city's 1,300 miles (2,100 km) of water pipes. (The city took no action until a series of major pipeline breaks led to emergency action in 1993.)

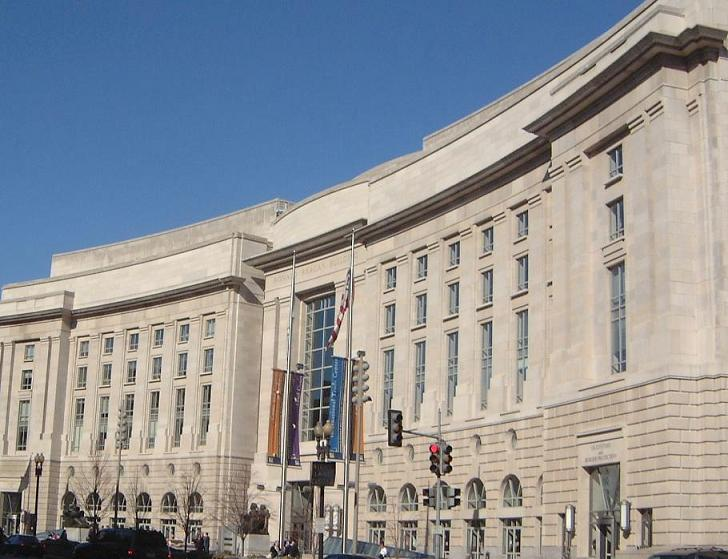
The Federal City Council initiated the effort to build the Ronald Reagan Building and International Trade Center, which completed the Federal Triangle complex.

The concept for a massive "trade center", which would become an international headquarters for corporations and trade associations, was a more successful project. In June 1983, the Federal City Council proposed that a huge $300 million structure be built on unused land adjacent to Maine Avenue SW. Despite local citizen opposition, the organization convinced D.C. Mayor Marion Barry to begin pushing the plan through the D.C. City Council and Congress. Opposition from executive branch agencies, however, derailed the plan, and by 1986 the Federal City Council was looking for an alternative site for the building. In late 1986, the association began pushing for construction of the trade center on a parking lot in Federal Triangle, an area originally intended for a major government office building in the 1930s but never built due to the financial distress caused by the Great Depression. This site won near-universal approval, and in 1987 Congress authorized construction of the Ronald Reagan Building and International Trade Center. Donald A. Brown, who chaired the Federal City Council's International Center Task Force, was one of five people nominated to the U.S. International Cultural and Trade Center Commission, which served as a board of supervisors overseeing the construction of the building. Terence Golden, who was director of the federal government's General Services Administration (GSA) and who helped shepherd the legislation authorizing the building through Congress, later was elected chairman of the board of directors of the Federal City Council. Originally intended to cost $363 million, the $818 million Ronald Reagan Building opened on May 5, 1998, after years of funding and construction delays.

The construction of the Washington Metro and development of the federal government became major issues for the Federal City Council in the mid-1980s. The group received approximately $250,000 in August 1985 to study the transit needs of the area through the year 2000, the first time a group independent of Metro was authorized by the federal government to conduct such a study. The organization's study, released in March 1986, said Metro faced a financial crisis by 2000 caused by significant cuts in federal funds as well as rapidly growing capital improvement needs (such as replacing subway cars and worn equipment and track). In December 1986, the Federal City Council issued a report that recommended that the federal government undertake a 10-year plan to construct new federal office buildings rather than lease space for federal agencies. The proposal seemed to die, but in 1990 the GSA incorporated its key recommendations into a new office space consolidation policy. GSA even proposed building a new United States Department of Transportation headquarters using air rights above the railroad tracks north of Union Station. The financing model for the structure had "the fingerprints of the Federal City Council all over it." (Note: The project never went forward. Instead, in 2002, the D.C.-based real estate development firm Akridge partnered with New York City-based investment fund Leucadia National Corporation (now known as Jeffries) to build Burnham Place—a $1.5 billion mixed-use development that will build a new passenger terminal and retail, residential, and office buildings over the tracks (while adding a large parking garage beneath the tracks).) The Federal City Council actively pushed for redevelopment of the northwest bank of the Anacostia River as a means of creating room for more federally owned office buildings as well as redeveloping the District of Columbia. The General Services Administration initially tried to lure the Securities and Exchange Commission to Buzzard Point by offering to construct it a new office building there in 1978, but this effort failed. By 1988, however, the Federal City Council was part heavily involved with the city government, the federal government, and private landowners to plan a redevelopment of the warehouse area into apartment and office buildings, parks, and retail space. (Note: Nothing came of these plans. Instead, in 2012, the District of Columbia announced a plan to replace and slightly realign the Frederick Douglass Memorial Bridge. This plan included creation of a massive, oval traffic circle with a large field (to be used for public gatherings, and suitable for several new memorials) at the north end of the bridge, reconnecting it with Potomac Avenue SW. The government of the District of Columbia budgeted $512.7 million over six years, beginning in fiscal 2016, to begin building the bridge. In July 2013, the city and the D.C. United professional soccer club signed an agreement to build a new soccer stadium on Buzzard Point. The city agreed to acquire some land at the site, and lease the land to the club for a minimal rent. The club agreed to build the stadium. Demolition and site preparation began in August 2016.)

In the late 1980s, the Federal City Council turned its attention to crime rather than development. By this time, Washington, D.C., was suffering from an epidemic of crack cocaine use. The drug made an appearance in the United States in 1981, and by the end of 1986 was deeply entrenched in the District of Columbia. The following year, one study estimated that there were 24,000 drug dealers in the city (38.6 per 1,000 residents), with at least 14,000 of them dealing on a regular basis (at least one day per week). By one estimate, cocaine and crack cocaine use doubled in the city between 1986 and 1987. A private study estimated that one in six African American men in the city were arrested for selling illegal drugs before the age of 21, and by 1990 a shocking one in four African American men in the city had sold drugs before the age of 30. By 1990, the District of Columbia had the nation's highest rate of drug addiction (32.9 per 1,000 residents). The crack cocaine epidemic drove the city's murder rate in 1988 to 372, and 80 percent of the city's murders were drug-related. With drug-related crime outstripping by far economic development as the city's largest problem, in 1986 the Federal City Council joined with the Community Foundation, the Greater Washington Board of Trade, and the Greater Washington Research Center to form the Washington Fund for the Prevention of Substance Abuse. By October 1988, the Federal City Council also sponsored the creation of the Corporation Against Drug Abuse (CADA), an employer-funded entity to encourage the adoption of stricter drug testing and drug abuse policies in the workplace and to work against drug abuse generally in the community.

As part of its interest in social programs, the Federal City Council also turned its attention for the first time to the District of Columbia Public Schools (DCPS). DCPS Superintendent Andrew E. Jenkins awarded the organization a $500,000 grant to assemble a team of 51 community leaders and review DCPS curricula, budget, extra-curricular programs, and educational goals and priorities. The grant was one of the largest ever made by the school system. The report, due in June 1989, was expected to guide the DCPS system through the 1990s. To build support for implementing the report's findings, the council created the D.C. Committee on Public Education (a group of parents and business, religious, and civic leaders), in 1988. When released on June 20, 1989, the report recommended spending $355 million over the next five years to extend the school day by five hours (to a 7 A.M. to 6 P.M. schedule); extend the school year by 40 days; construct new schools; repair existing schools; and add stronger math and science programs and multicultural education to the curriculum. To pay for the plan, the Federal City Council's team suggested cutting administrative costs by $8.5 million, eliminating 400 central staff positions, closing some schools, and selling some school property. The Committee on Public Education remained active for many years, issuing reports critical of the public school system.

In 1989, the Federal City Council issued a report castigating the government of the District of Columbia for allowing the city's roads to deteriorate. The report noted that the city spent just $5 million a year on road repair, which it used almost exclusively for temporary patches rather than permanent repair, upgrades, and maintenance. The report identified a $1.6 billion backlog in street maintenance projects. The backlogs led the city to separate its road maintenance, repair, and construction functions from the District of Columbia Department of Public Works, creating a new District Department of Transportation in 2002.

=== 1990s: The new convention center and new sports arena ===
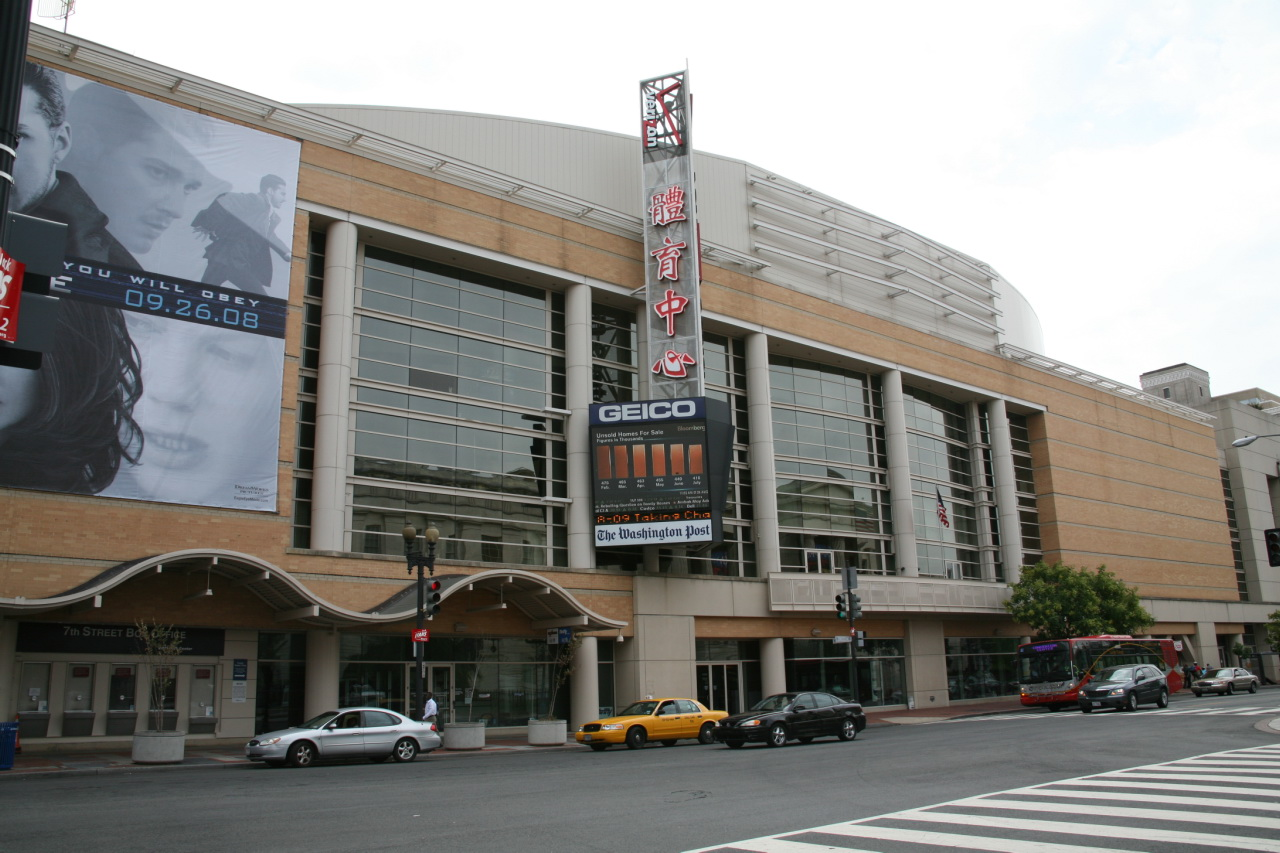
The Verizon Center (formerly the MCI Center) was built after the Federal City Council completed negotiations with sports team owner Abe Pollin.

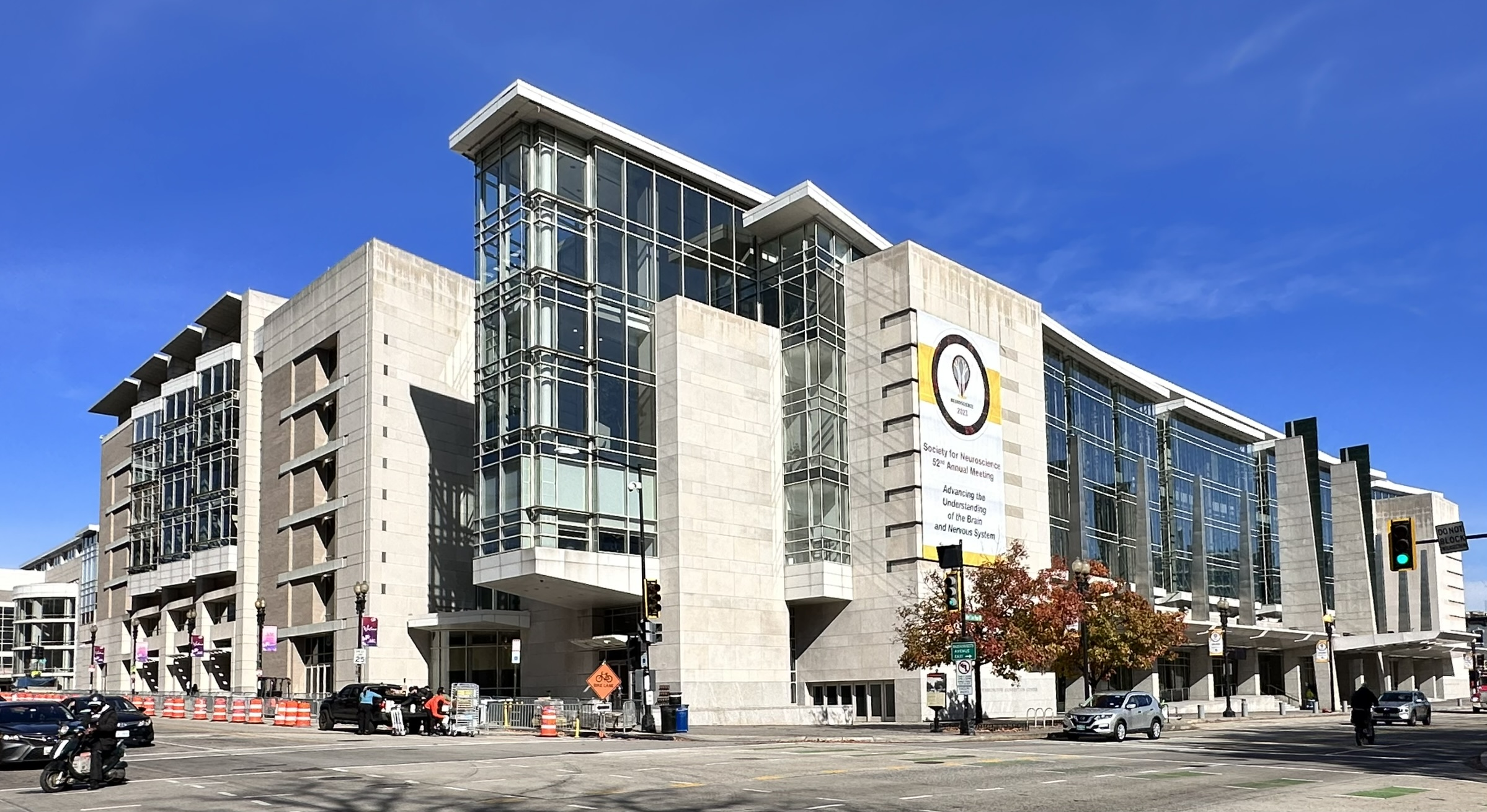
The new Walter E. Washington Convention Center was pushed by the Federal City Council as a replacement for the city's first convention center.

The Federal City Council helped win financing for a new Washington Convention Center. The existing convention center opened on December 10, 1982. But just eight years later, the facility's small size and a nationwide boom in the construction of large convention centers had caused the 285,000-square-foot (26,500 m^{2}) facility to see a dramatic drop in business. The Federal City Council pushed hard for the construction of a new, much larger convention center, and helped the city fashion ways to finance it. When the project encountered resistance from the business community and Congress, the Federal City Council mobilized its membership to come out publicly in support of the arena. In May 1990, the city unveiled plans for a new $685 million, 2,300,000-square-foot (210,000 m^{2}) convention center backed by the Federal City Council and the Board of Trade. Ground was broken for the new Walter E. Washington Convention Center on October 2, 1998.

Another project which the Federal City Council supported was construction of the MCI Center (now the Verizon Center) in Chinatown. Along with the Greater Washington Board of Trade and other private groups, the Federal City Council—not public officials, fans, or sports interests—pushed for a new arena downtown. Abe Pollin was the owner of the Washington Capitals and Washington Bullets, professional hockey and basketball teams (respectively) which played at the Capital Centre in Landover, Maryland. But the Capital Centre was a small, aging facility, and there seemed an opportunity to bring the teams back into the District of Columbia. The effort began in the summer of 1993, when Federal City Council president Ann Dore McLaughlin had a casual conversation with Gordon Gund, owner of the Cleveland Cavaliers professional basketball team, and learned of the "Cleveland model" for a public-private partnership to build a basketball arena in downtown Cleveland, Ohio. McLaughlin later shared this information with then-D.C. Mayor Sharon Pratt Kelly, who was enthusiastic but emphasized that the private sector must take the lead on the effort. McLaughlin began having talks with Pollin's friends and associates, and members of Pollin's staff. In early November, the Board of Trade sought and won a meeting with Pollin. Pollin said he had received several offers to sell both teams, and was likely to do so unless a first-class sports arena could be built. On December 16, the Federal City Council hosted a meeting with the Board of Trade, Chamber of Commerce, and city officials to decide to take action. The Federal City Council, Board of Trade, and D.C. Chamber of Commerce agreed at the meeting to jointly conduct a study of the arena issue. The study identified several challenges, but also discovered that many sports teams were moving back into downtown areas from suburban sites. The study also identified several potential sites for the new arena. The city dropped out of the project so as not to appear to be raiding another jurisdiction's sports teams. The Greater Washington Board of Trade initially led talks with Pollin, which began in mid-January, until Maryland officials pointed out that—as a representative of businesses in Maryland and Virginia, not just D.C.—the group had a conflict of interest. Wanting to bring the sports teams back to the city, the Federal City Council took over the talks and successfully convinced Pollin to move his teams. The Federal City Council hired several nationally known sports arena and financial consultants to conduct research into the financial feasibility of the proposed arena. These consultants also participated in talks with Pollin. The Federal City Council also successfully pressed the city to provide financing for the project and to help clear away permitting and construction hurdles. Construction on the MCI Center began in 1994 and ended in 1995.

The Federal City Council was less successful in keeping the Washington Redskins professional football team in town. In 1991 and 1992, team owner Jack Kent Cooke wanted a new stadium, but the cash-strapped city wanted to renovate Robert F. Kennedy Memorial Stadium. When talks between the city and Cooke broke down, Federal City Council officials tried to restart them. Cooke cancelled the talks, and then announced he was building a new stadium in Landover, Maryland.

The Federal City Council and its Committee on Public Education remained active on education issues in the 1990s. The council promoted privatization of the city's public schools in early 1994, and the committee issued a major report in January 1995 strongly criticizing the performance of the District of Columbia Public Schools. Although there were some improvements, the school system had declined in quality in the past six years, the report said. In June 1995, the Federal City Council endorsed private management of low-performing schools.

The Federal City Council also opposed casino gambling in the District, and paid for a study of the District's finances which was highly critical of the city's excessive spending and lack of revenue. It supported a 1995 plan by Mayor Marion Barry to spend $2 billion improving New York Avenue NE, efforts to build a local cultural center, downtown revitalization, an effort to give the District a delegate in the United States Senate, and a National Museum of American Music (to be part of the Smithsonian Institution). (Note: The idea for a music museum emerged out of a Federal City Council subcommittee called the Downtown Interactive Task Force, created in the early 1990s. Led by are real estate executive Herbert S. Miller, the task force was charged with coming up with ideas for ways to revitalize downtown D.C. The music museum was never built after Senator Kay Bailey Hutchison opposed the plan in October 2000. The Federal City Council revived the plan in the fall of 2003, but the idea gained little traction after the city decided not to support the project with donated land in 2004. The council signed a lease in 2008 to house the museum at the Carnegie Library of Washington D.C.—a site it had rejected in 2004—but backed out of the lease. This led to a lawsuit by the library's owner, the Historical Society of Washington, D.C.)

In the late 1990s, the Federal City Council adopted its first strategic plan.

=== 2000s: Moving away from economic development ===
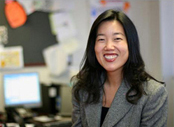
The Federal City Council actively promoted the mayoral takeover of D.C.'s public schools, which led to the hiring of new schools Chancellor Michelle Rhee.

Under the leadership of chairman Terence Golden in the late 1990s and early 2000s, the Federal City Council began changing its focus away from big-budget infrastructure projects and toward more "community living" initiatives such as the creation of affordable housing, improved public schools, anti-drug and anti-crime initiatives, and support programs for at-risk youth. The organization spent two years trying to convince the federal government to reopen Pennsylvania Avenue NW in front of the White House (to no avail) pushed a Constitutional amendment to give the District a seat in the House, and supported a legal brief in District of Columbia v. Heller, 554 U.S. 570 (2008), supporting the city's strict gun control law. It did, however, support one major construction project, the new Nationals Park (a baseball stadium for the city's new Major League Baseball franchise, the Washington Nationals).

Education reform continued to draw the organization's attention as well. The Federal City Council funded a study of the school system's administration, staff training, and curriculum by McKinsey & Company in 2001. The study led the D.C. Public Schools to adopt a five-year plan, titled "Business Plan for Strategic Reform", for making system wide improvements. Two years later, the organization partnered with the Kimsey Foundation and the Morino Institute to fund on-the-job training for 40 school principals over five years. In 2004, the Federal City Council led an effort to raise private money to help improve the salary of the Superintendent of the District of Columbia Public Schools. The move came as the city struggled to find a replacement for Paul L. Vance, who resigned in November 2003. In 2006, the organization quietly told city officials that it was deeply unhappy with the leadership provided by Clifford P. Janey, Vance's successor. It also funded a $400,000 study the same year on behalf of incoming mayor Adrian Fenty on how to take over the public school system. Fenty subsequently proposed major legislative changes that gave the mayor far greater power over the DCPS. These were approved by the city council in April 2007 and permitted to become law by the United States Congress. Janney was fired by Mayor Adrian Fenty on June 12, 2007, and Michelle Rhee installed as the city's new Chancellor of Public Schools. Certain statements by Rhee were misconstrued by opponents of the school takeover, who said that Rhee had to seek Federal City Council approval of all major city schools policy changes. Although Rhee never made any such statement, the claims gained some traction among some public school activists. But the Federal City Council was, according to The Washington Post reporter Mike DeBonis, "a prime supporter of Fenty's education reform efforts."

Reform of city finances and government also occupied the Federal City Council. In 2001, at the behest of Natwar M. Gandhi, D.C.'s chief financial officer, the organization agreed to update its 1994 study on city revenues in order to build a consensus in Congress for a restructuring of the District's financing mechanisms. The report, Assessing the District's Financial Position, released in March 2002, called for a commuter tax and restoration of an annual federal payment in lieu of property taxes. The report also warned of half-billion dollar budget deficits if city spending were not slashed and tax cuts deferred. In 2006, the organization raised $100,000 to help incoming chairman of the Council of the District of Columbia, Vincent C. Gray, fund a multiyear strategy plan for council action. It also raised more than $400,000 to help Fenty pay for an improved candidate recruitment process for his mayoral cabinet, and for a study on how to take over the public school system.

For the first time since the 1980s, the organization made another major push to improve funding for Metro. In September 2004, the Federal City Council joined with the Board of Trade and the Metropolitan Washington Council of Governments to create a task force to study Metro's revenues and financing. The group proposed that local governments dedicate a portion of their sales tax to Metro, but the plan generated no interest by local or state governments.

=== 2010s: Narrowed priorities ===
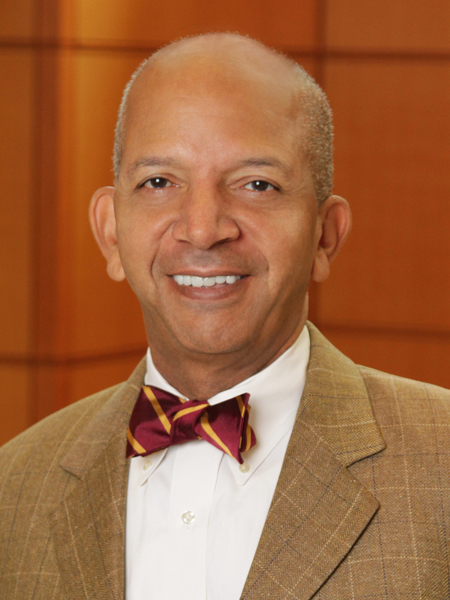
Former D.C. Mayor Anthony A. Williams was appointed chief executive officer/executive director of the Federal City Council in 2012.

In the 2010s, the Federal City Council continued to tackle many small issues in an attempt to improve the livability of Washington, D.C. These included improving the streetscape of 10th Street SW (also known as L'Enfant Promenade), adding a bus-only lane and streetcar to K Street NW in downtown, reopening Pennsylvania Avenue NW near the White House, addressing congestion on downtown streets, improving D.C.'s tourism industry, supporting the 2015 merger between Exelon and Pepco.

In 2011, the Federal City Council began work on a new strategic plan to guide the organization's decision-making. It was the first strategic plan for the organization in more than a decade. The plan identified four key priorities: Lowering unemployment by developing new industries (its top priority), ensuring the city's financial stability and integrity (its second priority), improving public education, and improving city infrastructure. By design, the strategic plan closely tracked the major priorities of newly elected Mayor Vincent C. Gray. In April 2012, the Federal City Council hired former mayor Anthony Williams as its new executive director. He replaced eight-year veteran John W. Hill, Jr. Williams reiterated the organization's focus on jobs, government effectiveness and efficiency, and improvements to infrastructure. Williams' appointment was widely seen by the news media as a significant boost to the organization's influence.

To work toward the goal of lower unemployment, the Federal City Council opposed enactment in 2013 of a "living wage" law in the District of Columbia. The organization also joined an effort, spearheaded by The 2030 Group, to plan a multi-decade strategy for helping seven key industries in the region grow as well as how to encourage greater economic diversification.

Tax issues largely occupied the group's attention when it came to the city's financial stability. The Federal City Council supported a successful city sales tax on gym memberships and yoga classes that generated $5 million a year. The organization backed the "wellness tax" in order to pay for a city council-enacted income tax cut that cost $143 million a year. The Federal City Council also supported the D.C. Tax Revision Commission, and members of the council served on the commission. The commission recommended changes to the District's tax code (including adding a bracket for middle-income earners and an increase in the standard deduction) which made it the second-most progressive in the nation. However, the organization also supported a bid to make the District of Columbia the American host-city candidate for the 2024 Summer Olympics. As the Federal City Council saw it, the bid gave the region an opportunity to engage in forward-looking plans that would ensure the region's economic stability by developing infrastructure, transportation, tourism, cultural facilities, and sporting venues that would last for 30 to 40 years.

The Federal City Council was active on a much wider range of infrastructure initiatives. It advocated in 2012 creation of a public-private investment trust fund to help rebuild and improve the city's parks, public transit system, and sewer system. It established an internal task force to identify new means of financing bridge improvement, repair, and replacement; a new city jail; and improvements to city-owned golf courses. In 2013, the organization announced the creation of the Anacostia Waterfront Trust to coordinate regional efforts to end the continuing pollution of the Anacostia River and to begin cleanup efforts of the riverbed. Doug Siglin, formerly the federal affairs director for the Chesapeake Bay Foundation, was named executive director of the Trust. The Federal City Council agreed to back a multibillion-dollar federal plan to end raw sewage flows into the river; mitigation of greywater, surface runoff, and urban runoff into the river; and research into the best way to address the deep deposits of dangerous contaminants on the river bottom. As part of its Anacostia River initiative, the council supported legislation (enacted in 2014) banning the use of polystyrene foam containers for use by food carryout providers. It also continued work to preserve and improve Union Station, and worked closely with the Union Station Redevelopment Corporation, Amtrak, the U.S. Department of Transportation, and local real estate developer Akridge to begin work on Burnham Place—a $1.5 billion mixed-use development that will build a new passenger terminal and retail, residential, and office buildings over the tracks (while adding a large parking garage beneath the tracks). This included studying the infrastructure and architectural/engineering aspects of Union Station and identifying as many sources for funding and financing as possible. From 2010 to 2015, the Federal City Council remained largely quiet on issues facing Metro and DC Streetcar, however. However, the organization did undertake a study of Metro in 2015 which led to a November 2016 report that called for a federal takeover of the transit agency if its three state-level partners did not agree to radically reconstitute Metro's governance structure. The report called for Metro's board to be drastically reduced in number and to be composed of transit professionals rather than political appointees. It also called for weaker protections for Metro's trade unions, and for each state-level partner to adopt a dedicated tax to support Metro's capital needs and operations. The Federal City Council said it would attempt to build a coalition, consisting primarily of the region's largest employers and businesses with the most revenue, to support the changes. Within two weeks, the Metropolitan Washington Council of Governments and the Greater Washington Board of Trade had signed on to the proposals. The state of Virginia agreed to back the idea of a smaller, more professional board.

The Federal City Council was somewhat inactive on education reform for the first half of the 2010s. It quietly supported the education reforms planned and implemented by public schools Chancellor Michelle Rhee and her successor, Kaya Henderson. The council first drew media attention in 2016, when the organization's executive director agreed to co-chair a mayoral panel studying improvements to the city's public and charter schools.

By 2016, the Federal City Council had expanded on its strategic plan by agreeing conduct more research into the city's problems, as well as act as a lobbyist for business before the Council of the District of Columbia. Lobbying came to the forefront due to the formation in 2001 of the DC Fiscal Policy Institute, a progressive think tank focused on local issues founded by the left-leaning Center on Budget and Policy Priorities. As part of its lobbying effort, the Federal City Council sent representatives on a trade mission to China and worked to defeat a proposed paid family leave bill.

== Projects ==
On several occasions, the Federal City Council has created subsidiary organizations to take on tasks of a specific geographic or technical nature. Some of these have proven highly influential in themselves. Short-term initiatives include a 1963 effort to demolish temporary building on the National Mall, a 1988 task force to win federal approval for the construction of an international trade center, the early 1990s Downtown Interactive Task Force, a 2002 effort to lobby the federal government for more money for the District of Columbia (led by Robert G. Liberatore, a senior vice president at DaimlerChrysler), and a 2012 working group to identify new means of financing infrastructure.

The Federal City Council has, on occasion, created longer-lived, semi-permanent or permanent subsidiaries or organizations as well.

=== Downtown Progress ===
The first longer-term project initiated by the Federal City Council was Downtown Progress. In 1958, the Federal City Council recommended the creation of a new organization to attract business investment in the former retail core of the District of Columbia. On April 1, 1960, this organization, the National Capital Downtown Committee, Inc.—better known as "Downtown Progress"—was formed as a joint effort of the Federal City Council and a federal agency, the National Capital Planning Commission. Knox Banner was Downtown Progress' long-time leader. The group, which represented primarily very large businesses, produced a number of extensive, expensive plans to redevelop downtown D.C. and build an extensive network of subway lines beneath the area. The organization helped to win the creation of the Washington Metro, and development of the Washington Convention Center. It was not successful, however, in pushing for a similar network of tunnels and roadways that would accommodate rapid-transit buses and truck delivery. Downtown Progress also worked closely with the Pennsylvania Avenue Development Corporation to develop plans for the restoration and redevelopment of Pennsylvania Avenue NW in the 1960s and 1970s, and worked with the National Park Service to restore Ford's Theatre in 1968.

=== Municipal Research Bureau ===
The second long-term organization created by the Federal City Council was the Municipal Research Bureau. Created in 1974, it was led by Philip M. Dearborn, Jr., an expert in municipal finance and director of the Brookings Institution's Greater Washington Research Program. Its mission was to provide general research on issues important to the District of Columbia. It merged with the Washington Center for Metropolitan Studies in 1978 to become the Greater Washington Research Center. The Greater Washington Research Center merged with the Brookings Institution in 2001.

=== The Economic Club of Washington, D.C. ===
In 1986, the Federal City Council spawned The Economic Club of Washington, D.C. The group formed in response to the nationalization and globalization of many D.C. businesses, as well as the rapid increase in "new economy" businesses inside the city and in the surrounding suburbs. There was a sense that many of the area's mid- and top-level managers were not from the area, felt little attachment to the region, and had few friends in the city. The Economic Club was founded by Federal City Council members Ed Hoffman (president of Woodward & Lothrop) and R. Robert Linowes (a successful local attorney). The goal was two-fold: First, to provide a way for business leaders to socialize, become acquainted with one another, and form a sense of community; second, to expose its members to new thinking and ideas in the realm of economics. The group has since become "a cornerstone of the Washington business community", largely on the basis of its ability to bring a group of top-level business leaders together to listen to policymakers. (It does not advocate for, lobby on behalf of, or speak for the business community.)

=== Committee on Public Education ===
D.C. Committee on Public Education (a group of parents and business, religious, and civic leaders), in 1988. When released on June 20, 1989, the report recommended spending $355 million over the next five years to extend the school day by five hours (to a 7 A.M. to 6 P.M. schedule); extend the school year by 40 days; construct new schools; repair existing schools; and add stronger math and science programs and multicultural education to the curriculum. To pay for the plan, the Federal City Council's team suggested cutting administrative costs by $8.5 million, eliminating 400 central staff positions, closing some schools, and selling some school property. The Committee on Public Education remained active for many years, issuing reports critical of the public school system.

=== Agenda Progress and D.C. Agenda ===
Another major project of the Federal City Council was Agenda Progress. This project came about in 1991 after former President Jimmy Carter asked members of the Federal City Council whether they believed their efforts would completely turn the city around in five to ten years. None did. Agenda Process was launched shortly after Carter's speech as a means to identify projects and mechanisms that would meet the challenge Carter set for the group.

Agenda Progress spent 1993 and 1994 cooperating with the Brookings Institution on a study of the finances of the District of Columbia. This study deeply influenced the Clinton administration's decision to impose the District of Columbia Financial Control Board on the city in 1995.

In 1995, Agenda Progress was renamed D.C. Agenda, and led by former Barry administration official James O. Gibson. Its original purpose was to serve as an unofficial transition committee at the start of Marion Barry's fourth term (1995 to 1999) as mayor. It represented the interests of large corporations and nonprofits doing business with city, providing them with research and technical assistance. In time, D.C. Agenda shifted its focus to building coalitions to support its agenda on city governance and financial/tax reform, improved support for economic development, neighborhood redevelopment, and at-risk youth intervention. In some cases, D.C. Agenda mimicked or implemented city functions and acted as a liaison with corporations or nonprofits to implement public policy. D.C. Agenda also had a subsidiary body, the D.C. Agenda Support Corporation, led by former District of Columbia Administrator Carol Thompson Cole. D.C. Agenda had several subcommittees as well, including an Economic Development Strategy Group (organized in 1996 and led by local attorney Dana Stebbins).

In 1997, D.C. Agenda proposed creating a nonprofit, tax-exempt, public-private economic development corporation. The organization, dominated by private developers, would have broad power (including eminent domain and the right to own property) to direct planning and engage in redevelopment of the city's downtown and business corridors. The proposal asked for $50 million in cash from the federal government (with 40 percent earmarked for redevelopment efforts by other nonprofits), and $250 million in redistributable tax credits and surplus federal property. The D.C. Agenda proposal became the National Capital Revitalization Corp., which was created by law adopted by the Council of the District of Columbia in April 1998.

D.C. Agenda created the nonprofit D.C. Children and Youth Investment Trust Corporation in 1999. The trust worked to obtain government and corporate grants to help at-risk youth and build after-school programs at city public schools. After several years of mismanagement, the trust collapsed and dissolved in April 2016. (Note: In 2007, D.C. Council member Harry Thomas, Jr. embezzle more than $350,000 from the trust and was sentenced to more than three years in prison. After the scandal, the trust struggled to obtain new funding. In 2013, a congressional investigation found that the trust lacked financial controls to properly account for its expenditures, which included administering the city's $20 million school voucher program.)

In 2000, D.C. Agenda began collecting funds from the public as part of a political campaign to support a referendum that would dramatically alter the powers of the D.C. State Board of Education. More than $80,000 was collected from 25 individuals. But the District of Columbia Office of Campaign Finance found that D.C. Agenda had failed to register as a political action committee, as required by law. D.C. Agenda president John H. McKoy (Note: McCoy was a former executive at Lockheed Martin IMS, a former director of the District of Columbia Office of Planning, a former executive vice president of the Anacostia Waterfront Corporation, and director of programmatic initiatives at the nonprofit Fight for Children.) agreed to return all the funds to avoid a fine.

D.C. Agenda dissolved in May 2004 after failing to raise the $1.7 million a year its annual budget required. (Note: D.C. Agenda drew its funding from grants provided by several national and local foundations, corporations, and the local and federal government.) Several of the organization's subsidiary efforts, such as the Neighborhood Information Service, the Morris and Gwendolyn Cafritz Foundation Awards, and Neighborhood College, were transferred to other nonprofits in the area. (Note: The Neighborhood Information Service collected a wide range of economic, social, demographic, and other information on the District's 131 neighborhoods, and distributed this information free to neighborhood leaders. The Cafritz Foundation Awards recognized city employees for exceptional service. Neighborhood College was a free program which educated neighborhood leaders about the history and current socio-economic status of their neighborhoods.)

=== Washington, DC Police Foundation ===
The Washington, DC Police Foundation (also known as the National Capital Police Fund) is a grant-making arm of the Federal City Council which provides grants to the Metropolitan Police Department of the District of Columbia (MPD). According to the Federal City Council, the foundation was created in 2000. It made a $10,000 grant to the MPD in 2004 to purchase stolen goods tracking software, and a $30,000 grant in 2005 to allow the MPD to purchase automobiles with GPS tags for use as "bait cars". It is unclear how the foundation generates its income.

=== Anacostia Waterfront Trust ===
In October 2013, the Federal City Council established a new nonprofit, the Anacostia Waterfront Trust, to coordinated regional and federal efforts to prevent the dumping of raw sewage and toxic materials into the Anacostia River, and to research ways in how best to handle the contaminants already on the riverbed. The organization began researching the history of Anacostia Park in 2016, in an attempt to identify past plans for the park. The effort was a prelude to beginning an effort to craft a strategic vision for the park that would allow for its sustainable development. The Trust also supported the D.C. government's plan for trading "stormwater retention credits" (similar to carbon credits) among businesses in an effort to reduce low-quality runoff into the Anacostia.

== About the Federal City Council ==
=== Influence ===
The Federal City Council is highly influential in real estate development and urban planning issues in the District of Columbia. It is the Federal City Council's focus on construction and development that, according to The Washington Post reporter David Leonhardt, has allowed the organization to be at the forefront in promoting "almost every major downtown development project since World War II", including Southwest urban renewal, the entire Washington Metro, the Pennsylvania Avenue Development Corporation, the Ronald Reagan Building and International Trade Center, and the renovation of Union Station. In the late 1960s through the late 1970s, The Washington Post said, the organization "sometimes carried more clout on Capitol Hill than the District's political leadership." Post columnist Colbert I. King said its power rivaled that of the city council in 2006, while Post reporters Marc Fisher and Valerie Strauss in 1997 said the group consisted of "Washington's corporate and governmental elite". Mark Bisnow of the Washington Business Journal called the Federal City Council "the most important organization in Washington you've never heard of" in 2005 and Post reporter Mike DeBonis described it as "the city's ultimate conglomeration of economic power". Post reporter Jerry Knight called the organization "self-appointed...business Brahmins" in 1989, while Colbert I. King said in 2007 that the Federal City Council was synonymous with the Washington establishment.

In 2012, however, The Washington Post business columnist Steven Pearlstein argued that the Federal City Council lost much of its influence in the first decade of the 21st century. He argued that, in part, the organization was a victim of its success, having accomplished most of its goals. This has allowed members of the organization to turn their attention elsewhere. He also asserted it lacked effective and visionary leadership, that globalization of local businesses had robbed the organization of support, that excessive partisanship at the federal and state levels make progress nearly impossible, and that many of the problems now confronting the city are regional in nature.

Its members admit to being self-interested and looking out for their own interests, but claim they do so only to make the city more livable. The group has also been criticized for ignoring the views of residents affected by Federal City Council projects, of lacking accountability, and pursuing an agenda at odds with those of the public.

=== Avoiding press attention ===
The Federal City Council has a longstanding unofficial policy of avoiding press attention and publicity, (Note: The Washington Post has consistently supported the Federal City Council's projects in its editorial pages.) although in 2016 executive director Anthony Williams said that the group would be implementing some incremental changes to its policy of avoiding the press.

The group's media-avoidance policy has been characterized in various ways. The Economist described it in 1988 as a "select and shadowy gathering of some of the city's top business and professional people", "[o]perating on the old-boy network". In 1997, reporter Bradford McKee called the organization "secretive" and "a shadow chamber of commerce and phantom government..." In 2014, Jonathan O'Connell at The Washington Post called it "historically insular". Other descriptions of the group's publicity shyness have been more positive. Washington Post columnist Colbert I. King has dismissed theories that the organization is "a clandestine outfit", noting it merely "work[s] quietly behind the scenes on city issues". This view is echoed by Post reporters Yolanda Woodlee and Ashlee Clark. Post business columnist Steven Pearlstein has argued that the organization's avoidance of publicity has been one of the reasons it has been so successful.

=== Membership ===
The Federal City Council is a private, nonprofit organization of business people, civic leaders, former federal executive branch officials, and local and federal politicians. Membership in the organization is by invitation only. Members are known as "trustees", and the membership group is known as the Board of Washington Trustees. The Washington Business Journal says the organization declines to identify its members. However, as of December 2016 the organization provides the names of about 225 trustees and "trustee emeritus" on its Web site.

The Federal City Council's members include some of the city's wealthiest and most civic-minded businesspeople. The members have been described as the representative of the city's "business elite" and the organization as the "key business voice" in the city.

Reports of the number of members have varied over time. The Washington Post said it had either 100 or 137 members in 1975, 150 members in 1994, 150 members in 2000 and 2002, 190 members in 2002, more than 250 members in 2003, 194 members in 2004, (Note: These were mostly white men. The organization had 31 African Americans and two women as members in 2004) either 170 or 180 members in 2011, and 170 members in 2012. As of 2023, membership rose to more than 230 members.

As of 2003, the Federal City Council and the Washington Board of Trade shared many members, George Mason University professor Michael K. Fauntroy characterized the Federal City Council as "more of an elitist group than the Board".

=== Governance, presidents, and chairmen ===
Leadership of the Federal City Council consists of a president and a chairman of the Washington Board of Trustees. A presidential term is one year. A president may succeed him or her self, there are no term limits, and most presidents serve several years. The board meets twice a year. The chairman is assisted by a vice chairman. Additional officers include a secretary; treasurer; two vice presidents; vice presidents for federal relations, membership, membership engagement, nominations, and strategic planning; a general counsel; and the chief executive officer/executive director.

The board elects 28 members to serve on an executive committee, which meets monthly and governs the organization between board meetings. Ex officio members of the executive committee (who have no voting rights) include the chairs of the Federal City Council's standing committees and task forces, the chair of the Greater Washington Board of Trade, and the chair of the D.C. Chamber of Commerce.

In 1958, the organization established a "national advisory board" consisting of individuals who may have once lived in Washington, D.C., or who have a strong interest in the city but do not live there. These individuals were often former members of Congress, former executive branch department heads, or corporate executives. This body apparently no longer exists.

A partial list of the presidents of the Federal City Council includes:

1. George A. Garrett - November 1954 to December 1961 (Note: Garrett was United States Minister to Ireland from April 10, 1947, to March 16, 1950. The position was then upgraded to Ambassador on March 17, 1950, and Garrett continued to serve as Ambassador until May 27, 1951.)
2. Gordon Gray - January 1962 to 1963 (Note: Gray was United States Secretary of the Army from 1949 to 1950 under President Harry S. Truman and National Security Advisor from 1958 to 1961 under President Dwight D. Eisenhower.)
3. William P. Rogers - September 1963 to September 1965 (Note: Rogers was United States Attorney General from October 23, 1957, to January 20, 1961.)
4. Stephen Ailes - September 1965 to September 1970 (Note: Ailes was United States Secretary of the Army from January 28, 1964, to July 1, 1965.)
5. George C. McGhee - September 1970 to 1974 (Note: McGhee was a career diplomat who served as United States Ambassador to Turkey; Assistant Secretary of State for Near Eastern, South Asian, and African Affairs; Under Secretary of State for Political Affairs; and United States Ambassador to West Germany.)
6. Sol Linowitz - 1974 to September 1978 (Note: Linowitz was chairman of Xerox from 1961 to 1965, co-negotiated the Torrijos–Carter Treaties in 1977, and was President Jimmy Carter's Middle East peace negotiators from 1979 to 1981.)
7. James T. Lynn - September 1978 to September 1983 (Note: Lynn was Secretary of Housing and Urban Development from 1973 to 1975.)
8. Harry McPherson - September 1983 to September 1990 (Note: McPherson was Special Assistant and Counsel to the President, and then Special Counsel to the President, in the Lyndon B. Johnson administration from 1966 to 1969.)
9. Ann Dore McLaughlin - September 1990 to September 1995 (Note: McLaughlin (now divorced and remarried, using the name Ann McLaughlin Korologos) was an Under Secretary of the Department of the Interior and Under Secretary of the Department of the Treasury, and was United States Secretary of Labor from 1987 to 1989.)
10. Tom Foley - September 1995 to September 1998 (Note: Foley was a representative from Washington state from 1965 to 1995, and Speaker of the United States House of Representatives from 1989 to 1995.)
11. Bob Dole - September 1998 to 2002 (Note: Dole was the U.S. Senator from Kansas from 1969 to 1996, and Senate Majority Leader from 1985 to 1985, and again from 1995 to 1996.)
12. Fred Thompson - November 2002 to October 2005 (Note: Thompson was a well-known actor, and a senator from Tennessee from 1994 to 2003.)
13. Frank Keating - October 2005 to November 2012 (Note: Keating was Governor of Oklahoma from 1995 to 2003.)
14. Thomas M. Davis - December 2012 to present (Note: Davis represented Virginia in the U.S. House of Representatives from 1995 to 2008.)

The chairmanship of the board of directors turns over frequently. As of 2016, the chairman was Robert J. Flanagan, construction (Clark Enterprises) and investment (CNF Investments) executive first elected on December 3, 2012. Past chairmen include Washington Gas executive Donald S. Bittinger; and Riggs Bank chairmen Vincent C. Burke and Lewellyn Jennings; hotel executive Terence C. Golden, and construction executive Linda Rabbitt.

The vice chairman as of 2016 was hotel executive W. Edward Walter.

=== Budget and other staff ===
Although funding for the Federal City Council is not clear, its budget is substantial. Its fiscal 2014 budget was $2.2 million, up from $1.5 million in fiscal 2013.

As of April 2012, the news media reported that the Federal City Council had a small staff of just five people (up from four staff in 1994). However, the organization's Web site lists 11 staff (including two who work for the Anacostia Waterfront Trust). Its internal staff structure is not clear, and there have been many title changes over the years. The organization's day-to-day operations are overseen by a chief executive officer/executive director. Chief executive officers/executive directors have included:

- G. Yates Cook - 1954 to 1974
- Kenneth R. Sparks - 1974 to September 2004
- John W. Hill, Jr. - October 2004 to June 2012 (Note: Hill was executive director of the District of Columbia Financial Control Board from its inception in 1995 to 1999, chief executive of the charity In2Books, and chairman of the board of directors of the District of Columbia Public Library. He earned $396,000 in 2010 as executive director of the Federal City Council.)
- Anthony A. Williams - July 2012 to present (as of November 2016)

Michael F. Brimmer served as its deputy executive director from 1975 to 1985. He was followed by David Perry, who served from 1985 to about 2005.

Other staff include a chief operating officer, (Note: Victor A. Reinoso joined the Federal City Council in 2003 as director of education projects, working on school reform. He was elected a member of the D.C. State Board of Education in 2004. He was named the Federal City Council's chief operating officer in 2006, and left the organization in January 2007 after being named deputy mayor for education by Mayor Adrian Fenty. As of November 2016, the chief operating officer was Kevin Clinton.) managing director, (Note: Jacque Patterson, chairperson of the Ward 8 Democrats, was managing director in 2011.) a director of finance and administration, a director of membership and events, a senior research associate, and a research associate. In 2013, the position of managing director was retitled deputy executive director. (Note: Emeka Moneme, a former transportation executive with the city and Metro, was hired as an infrastructure investment senior associate, but promoted to deputy executive director.)

== See also ==
- Warren County Economic Development Authority (WCEDA)

== Bibliography ==
- Barras, Jonetta Rose (1998). The Last of the Black Emperors: The Hollow Comeback of Marion Barry in the New Age of Black Leaders. Baltimore, Md.: Bancroft Press. ISBN 9780963124661.
- Fauntroy, Michael K. (2003). Home Rule or House Rule: Congress and the Erosion of Local Governance in the District of Columbia. Lanham, Md.: University Press of America. ISBN 9780761827139.
- Derthick, Martha (1962). City Politics in Washington, D.C. Cambridge, Mass.: Joint Center for Urban Studies of the Massachusetts Institute of Technology and Harvard University.
- Gillette, Howard (2006). Between Justice and Beauty: Race, Planning, and the Failure of Urban Policy in Washington, D.C. Philadelphia, Pa.: University of Pennsylvania Press. ISBN 9780812205299.
- Gutheim, Frederick A.; Lee, Antoinette J. (2006). Worthy of the Nation: Washington, D.C., From L'Enfant to the National Capital Planning Commission. Baltimore, Md.: Johns Hopkins University Press. ISBN 9780801883286.
- Haley, John (2009). "Crack Cocaine". In Golden, Robert N.; Peterson, Fred L. (eds.). The Truth About Drugs. New York: Facts on File. ISBN 9780816076307.
- Leon, Wilmer J. III (2010). "Marion Barry, Jr.: A Politician for the Times". In Walters, Ronald W.; Travis, Toni-Michelle (eds.). Democratic Destiny and the District of Columbia: Federal Politics and Public Policy. Lanham, Md.: Lexington Books. ISBN 9780739127162.
- Lusane, Clarence; Desmond, Dennis (1991). Pipe Dream Blues: Racism and the War on Drugs. Boston: South End Press. ISBN 9780896084100.
- McKee, Bradford (November 1997). "Washington's Planning Politics". Architecture: The AIA Journal: 47–51.
- Subcommittee on Fiscal and Government Affairs (1978). Amend Redevelopment Act of 1945 and Transfer U.S. Real Property to RLA: Hearings and Markups Before the Subcommittee on Fiscal and Government Affairs and the Committee on the District of Columbia. Committee on the District of Columbia. U.S. House of Representatives. 95th Cong., 2d sess. Washington, D.C.: U.S. Government Printing Office. hdl:2027/mdp.39015081144753.
- Walsh, Anthony; Ellis, Lee (2007). Criminology: An Interdisciplinary Approach. Thousand Oaks, Calif.: SAGE Publications. ISBN 9781412938402.
