= District of Columbia Housing Authority =

Public housing agency in Washington, D.C., United States

Agency overview
- Formed: 1934
- Jurisdiction: District of Columbia, United States
- Headquarters: 300 7th St SW, Washington, DC 20024
- Agency executives: Raymond Skinner, (Board Chair); Keith Pettigrew, (Executive Director)
- Key document: Public Housing Law
- Website: dchousing.org

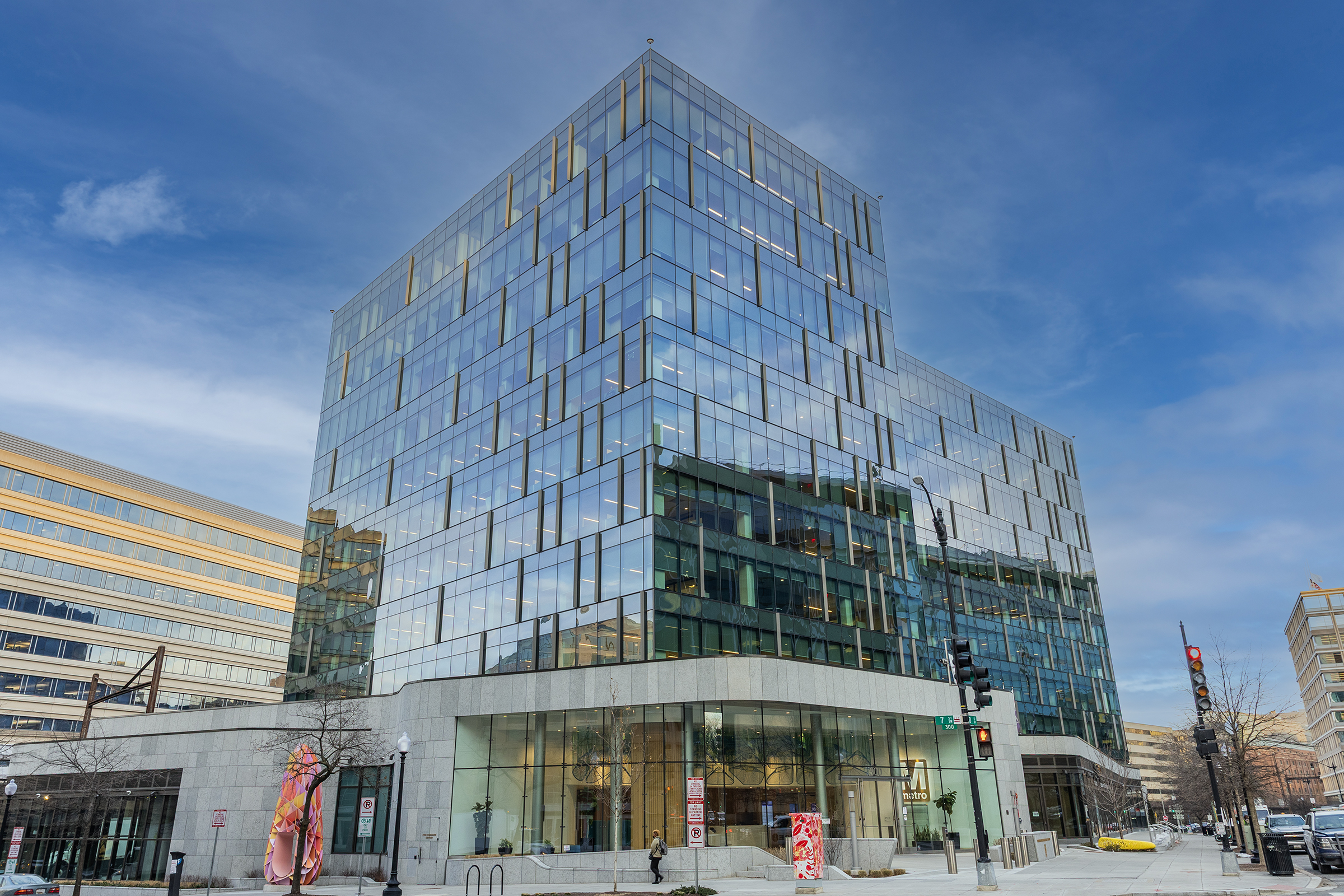
District of Columbia Housing Authority

The District of Columbia Housing Authority is an independent government agency whose mission is to provide affordable housing to extremely low- through moderate-income households, foster sustainable communities, and cultivate opportunities for residents to improve their lives throughout the eight wards of the District of Columbia, in the United States.

One of the District’s largest landlords, DCHA provides subsidized housing to approximately 50,000 residents, nearly one-tenth of the District’s population. The waitlist for housing assistance was closed in April 2013. Since closed in May 2014, the authority has been in the midst of a campaign to identify those who still need assistance on the list.

DCHA manages 52 properties with approximately 8,000 public housing units. The authority also supplies more than 13,000 housing vouchers to District residents, including some 800 Veterans Affairs Supportive Housing (VASH) vouchers, more than 2,000 Local Rent Subsidy Program (LRSP) vouchers, and thousands from the federal Housing Choice Voucher Program (HCVP), formerly known as Section 8.

Nearly 19,500 families receive support from DCHA, the majority of those families have black women as the head of household. About 70 percent of those families are voucher holders. Nearly eight percent of DCHA's clients are elderly and 18 percent are disabled.

== Finances ==
The District of Columbia Housing Authority had $560 million in net assets as of January 2013. More than 99 percent of DCHA's funding comes from the federal government. In 2012 and 2013, about 77 percent of the agency's total revenues were provided by the U.S. Department of Housing and Urban Development (HUD) for HCVP and an additional 11 percent for DCHA-administered public housing grants. Rents paid by public housing residents contributed seven percent of total revenues. The remaining four percent of revenue is from a variety of sources, including laundry rooms, service fees, grants, and philanthropic support.

More than 60 percent of operating revenue was allocated to providing housing assistance vouchers to tenants while the remaining 40 percent was used for maintenance, protective services, utilities, tenant services and programs, and administrative operations

== Controversies ==
=== Headquarters redevelopment ===
In 2013, the Housing Authority announced that it would put its headquarters building in the rapidly gentrifying NoMa neighborhood up for redevelopment. The redevelopment plans drew controversy as they originally only planned to require 70 units of deeply affordable housing on site and upon revision, the plans included 244 housing units reserved for moderate incomes rather than being deeply affordable. These 244 would be out of 1,200 market rate units the developer would be able to produce on site.

After significant criticism from activists and at-large Council member Elissa Silverman, the Housing Authority agreed to request at least half of the 244 units be available to be deeply affordable, albeit that request was not legally binding. The debate was framed by arguments that the Housing Authority was not serving its purpose housing the poorest residents of the District, but rather amplifying the effects of gentrification on the District.

=== Rent overpayments ===
An investigation by The Washington Post in 2023 found that DCHA overpaid rents to landlords by millions of dollars. DCHA pays for the rent of 15,000 low-income households each year. Regulations require the Housing Authority to make sure that rents it pays for are market rate, but the investigation found that it failed to do so.

== Conventionally-owned public housing developments ==
There are more than 7,100 units in 52 traditional public housing developments. Of those properties, 14 serve the elderly and disabled. DCHA maintains an occupancy rate of approximately 75 percent. (According to the Director at the May 2021 Board of Commissioners meeting) Tenants pay 30 percent of their adjusted income towards rent. The average rent paid by a public housing household is approximately $250.

Northwest

- 2905 11th Street
- Claridge Towers
- Colorado Apartments
- Columbia Road
- Garfield Terrace Family
- Garfield Terrace Senior
- Harvard Towers
- Horizon House
- James Apartments
- Judiciary House
- Kelly Miller
- LeDroit Apartments
- Oak Street Apartments
- Ontario Road
- Park Morton
- Regency House
- Scattered Sites
- Sibley Plaza
- Sursum Corda
- Williston Apartments

Northeast

- Fort Lincoln
- Kenilworth Courts
- Langston Additions
- Langston Terrace
- Lincoln Heights
- Lincoln Road
- Montana Terrace
- Richardson Dwellings

Southwest

- Greenleaf Gardens
- Greenleaf Gardens Additions
- Greenleaf Gardens Extensions
- Greenleaf Senior
- James Creek
- Syphax Garden

Southeast

- Barry Farm
- Benning Terrace
- Carroll Apartments
- Elvans Road
- Fort Dupont Additions
- Fort Dupont Dwellings
- Highland Addition
- Highland Dwellings
- Hopkins Apartments
- Kentucky Courts
- Knox Hill
- Marley Ridge
- Potomac Gardens
- Potomac Senior
- Stoddert Terrace
- The Villager
- Wade Apartments
- Woodland Terrace

== Mixed-income developments ==
DCHA has responsibility and financial interest in 23 mixed-income properties, but does not own them directly. Within those properties there are nearly 4,500 units, 3,900 of them are affordable, including more than 1,230 public housing units.

Northwest

- Gibson Plaza
- The Avenue at Park Morton

Northeast

- Capitol Gateway
- Edgewood Terrace
- 4800 Nannie Hellen Burroughs
- MetroTowns
- St. Martin’s
- Victory Square Senior Apartments

Southeast

- Capital Quarters Townhomes I
- Capital Quarters Townhomes II
- Capper Senior I
- Capper Senior II
- Fairlawn Marshall
- Glenncrest
- Henson Ridge
- Kentucky Courts II
- Matthews Memorial Terrace
- Oxford Manor
- Sheridan Station Phase I
- Townhomes on Capitol Hill
- Triangle View
- Wheeler Creek Family
- Wheeler Creek Senior
