= Linda Rabbitt =

American construction executive

Linda Rabbitt is an American entrepreneur based in Washington metropolitan area. She is the founder and chairperson of Rand Construction Corporation (Rand**). According to The Washington Post, she is one of the most influential people in Washington area business.

== Early life and education ==
Rabbitt was born in the suburbs of Detroit, Michigan, and grew up in Grosse Pointe Woods and Bloomfield Hills. Her father immigrated to the United States from Germany in 1925 and worked in the automotive industry, and her mother was the daughter of Italian immigrants.

In 1970, Rabbitt graduated from the University of Michigan with a degree in social studies and a minor in education. In 1972, she earned a master's degree in education from the George Washington University (GWU).

== Career ==
After graduating from GWU, Rabbitt taught history and English in Fairfax County, Virginia. In 1981, she joined the accounting firm Peat Marwick (now part of KPMG since 1987) as secretary. Later, she was promoted to marketing director.

In 1985, Rabbitt co-founded Hart Construction with Sherry Turner, a marketer at an architectural firm. Rabbitt left Hart in 1989.

In July 1989, Rabbitt co-founded Rand construction corporation with Mark Anderson, a construction manager. As of 2024, she has served as the company's chairperson and the major shareholder.

In 2016, Rabbitt and Rand company were the subject of Harvard Business School case study.

== Affiliations ==
From 1993 to 2001, and since 2018, Rabbitt has served on the board of directors of The Economic Club of Washington, D.C., a nonprofit organization of local business leaders. She is the longest-serving director in the club's history, and in 2022, she received the inaugural Arne M. Sorenson Excellence in Leadership Award.

Rabbitt served on the board of Willis Towers Watson when the company was Towers Watson, and, before that, Watson Wyatt.

In 2009, Rabbitt joined the board of the Federal Reserve Bank of Richmond. From 2010 to 2012, she served as deputy chair. From 2013 to 2014, she served as chair.

As of 2024, Rabbitt serves as a trustee emeritus of the George Washington University and on the board of directors of Children's National Medical Center.

Rabbitt has also been active in local business organizations. She's served on the boards of what, according to The Washington Post, are "generally regarded as the area's two most influential business groups": the Federal City Council and the Greater Washington Board of Trade. She chaired the council from 2010 to 2012 and the Trade Board in 2002.

She is a past president of the Washington chapters of Commercial Real Estate Women and the International Women's Forum.

== Philanthropy ==
In 2003, Rabbitt had Rand build the offices of the National Breast Cancer Coalition pro bono.

In 2012, Rabbitt financed an executive education program at George Washington University, "On the Board," to teach women how to be corporate board members.

== Personal life ==
Rabbitt was married in 1975, and later had two daughters. The marriage ended in divorce in 1980.

In 1990, she married John "Jake" Whalen. They live in Bethesda, Maryland.

In 2000, Rabbitt was diagnosed with breast cancer, which was treated with several surgeries and chemotherapy.
