= Mount Zion (Milldale, Virginia) =

Historic house in Virginia, United States

- U.S. National Register of Historic Places
- U.S. Historic district – Contributing property
- Virginia Landmarks Register
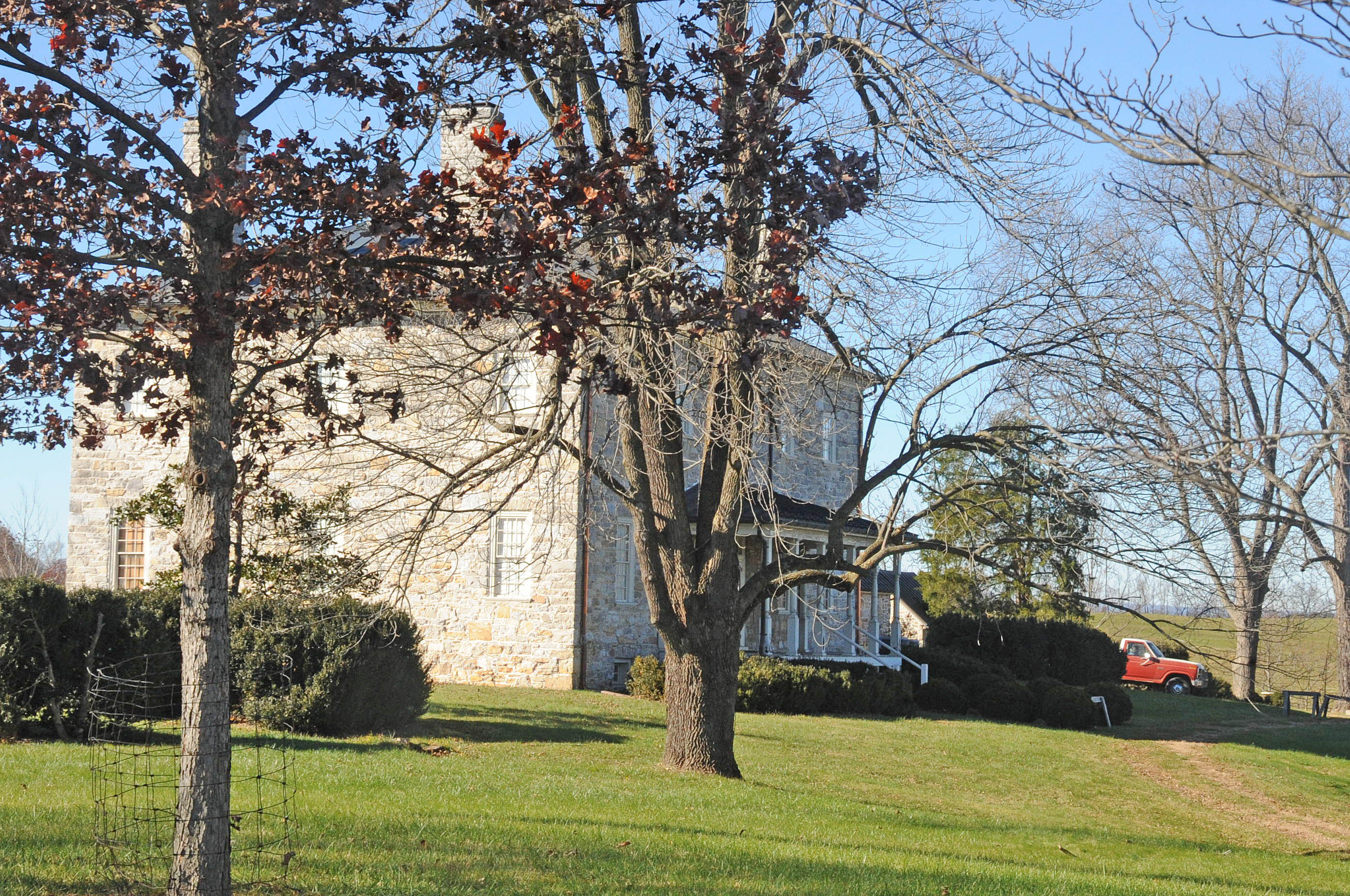
- House in 2016

- Location within Northern Virginia Location within Virginia Location within the United States
- Location: NE of jct. of Rtes. 624 and 639, Milldale, Virginia
- Coordinates: 38°59′59″N 78°6′11″W
- Area: 375 acres (152 ha)
- Built: 1771-1772
- Part of: Rockland Rural Historic District (ID15000809)
- NRHP reference No.: 70000830
- VLR No.: 093-0008

Significant dates
- Added to NRHP: February 26, 1970
- Designated CP: November 17, 2015
- Designated VLR: December 2, 1969

Mount Zion is a historic home located at Milldale, Warren County, Virginia. It was built in 1771–1772, and is a two-story, seven-bay, fieldstone mansion. It has a hipped roof and four interior end chimneys. The front facade features windows in a widely spaced Palladian motif on the second story.

It was listed on the National Register of Historic Places in 1970, and was listed again as part of the Rockland Rural Historic District in 2015.

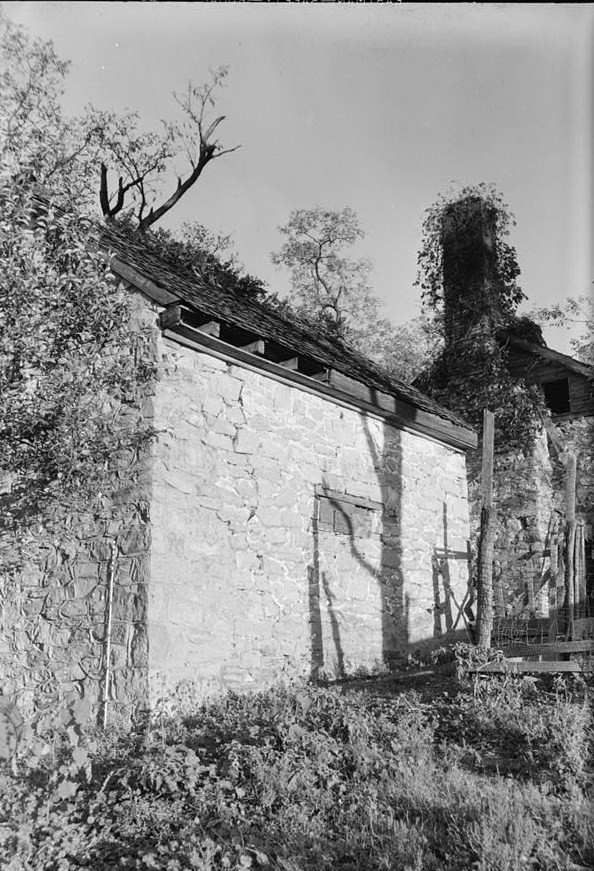
Historic American Buildings Survey photo

== See also ==
- National Register of Historic Places listings in Warren County, Virginia
