= Erin (Front Royal, Virginia) =

Historic home near Front Royal, Warren County, Virginia

- U.S. National Register of Historic Places
- U.S. Historic district – Contributing property
- Virginia Landmarks Register
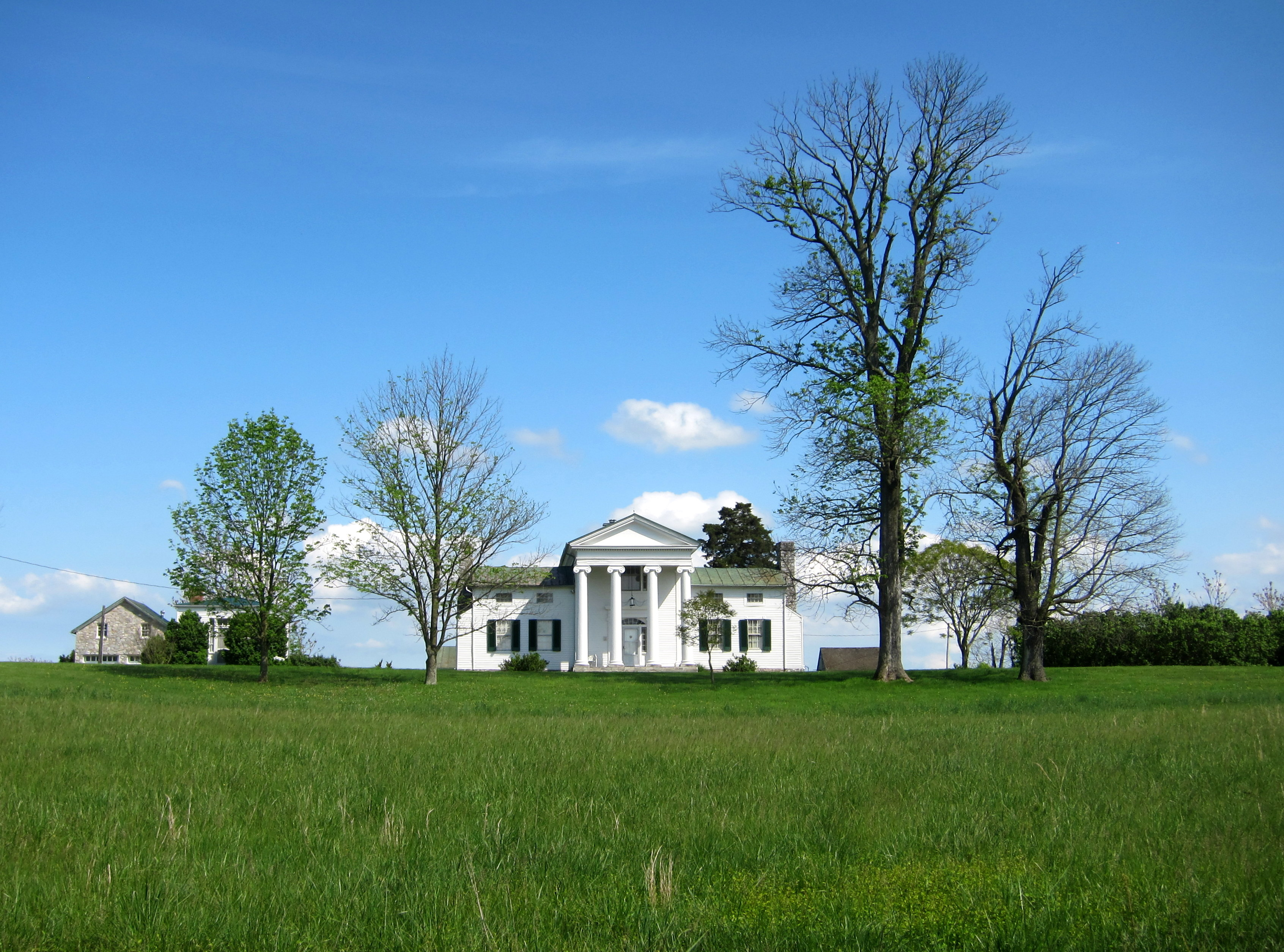

- Location within Shenandoah Valley Location within Northern Virginia Location within Virginia Location within the United States
- Location: NE of Front Royal on U.S. 340/522, near Front Royal, Virginia
- Coordinates: 39°01′21″N 78°09′35″W
- Area: 36 acres (15 ha)
- Built: 1848
- Architectural style: Greek Revival, Ionic;three-part Palladian
- Part of: Rockland Rural Historic District (ID15000809)
- NRHP reference No.: 79003093
- VLR No.: 093-0003

Significant dates
- Added to NRHP: December 28, 1979
- Designated CP: November 17, 2015
- Designated VLR: October 16, 1979

Erin is a historic home located near Front Royal, Warren County, Virginia. It was built in 1848, and is a three part Palladian plan dwelling with a two-story central section and 1 1/2-story flanking wings. The front facade features a two-story tetrastyle pedimented portico in the Greek Ionic order. The frame dwelling has impressive Greek Revival detailing on both its exterior and interior. Also on the property are the contributing kitchen, law office, dairy, meat smokehouse, chicken house, and granary.

It was listed on the National Register of Historic Places in 1979, and was listed again as part of the Rockland Rural Historic District in 2015.
