= Ashby, Virginia =

Ashby, Virginia is a hamlet located in Cumberland County, Virginia. Ashby is widely known for its various paranormal incidents during the 19 century. Many of the incidents are poorly reported, however recently discovered photographs have confirmed a number of these incidents. There are two Virginia communities named Ashby: This one is located in Cumberland County and the other is located in Warren County. thumb

- Ashby, Warren County, Virginia
