= Rockland Rural Historic District =

Historic district in Virginia, United States

- RICELAND RURAL HISTORIC DISTRICT, FRONT ROYAL, WARREN COUNTY, VA.jpg House on Rockland Road

The Rockland Rural Historic District is a large rural historic district located near Front Royal in northeastern Warren County, Virginia, US. It encompasses more than 10,000 acres (4,000 ha), roughly bounded on the north by the Clark County line, and the east by the Shenandoah River. This area has a road network and land-use pattern dating to the 18th century.

The district was listed on the National Register of Historic Places in 2015. It includes two previously-listed properties: Erin and Mount Zion.

== See also ==
- National Register of Historic Places listings in Warren County, Virginia
