= Milldale, Virginia =

Coordinates: 39°00′07″N 78°05′53″W

Milldale is a community in Warren County, Virginia, United States. Mount Zion, a historic house in the area, was listed on the National Register of Historic Places in 1970.
