= Happy Creek, Virginia =

- Unincorporated community
- Location within Virginia Location within the United States
- Coordinates: 38°55′47″N 78°08′55″W
- Country: United States
- State: Virginia
- County: Warren
- Elevation: 643 ft (196 m)
- Time zone: UTC-5 (Eastern (EST))
  - Summer (DST): UTC-4 (EDT)
- ZIP code: 22630
- Area code: 540
- GNIS feature ID: 1494982

Happy Creek is an unincorporated community in Warren County, Virginia, United States. Happy Creek is located 2.6 miles (4.2 km) east-northeast of Front Royal on Happy Creek Road.
