= Apple Mountain Lake, Virginia =

Apple Mountain Lake
- CDP
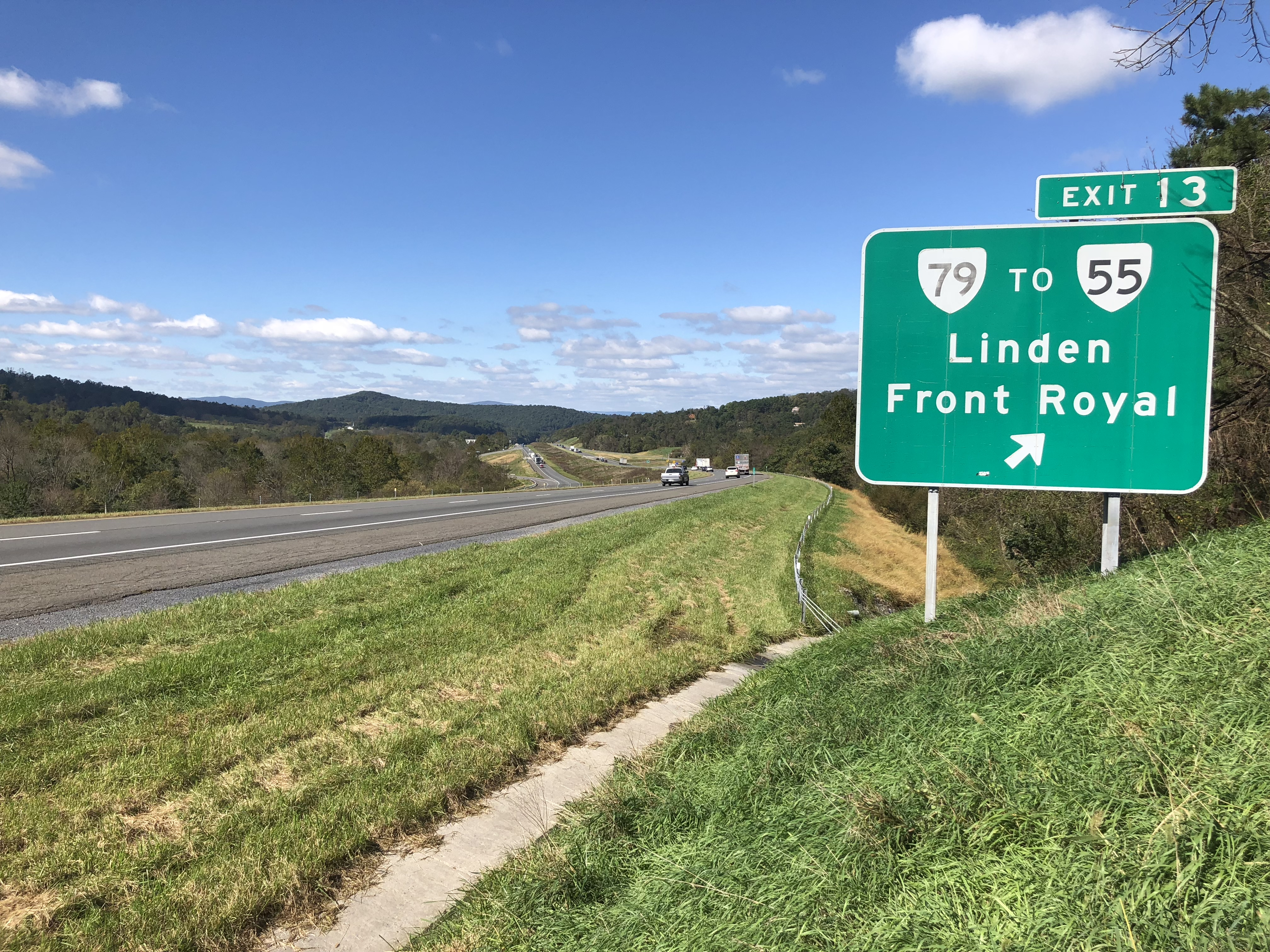
- I-66 in Apple Mountain Lake

- Location within the Commonwealth of Virginia Apple Mountain Lake (Virginia) Apple Mountain Lake (the United States)
- Coordinates: 38°55′33″N 78°6′14″W
- Country: United States
- State: Virginia
- County: Warren

Population (2020)
  - Total: 1,400
- Time zone: UTC−5 (Eastern (EST))
  - Summer (DST): UTC−4 (EDT)
- ZIP codes: 22642
- FIPS code: 51-02064
- GNIS feature ID: 2629747

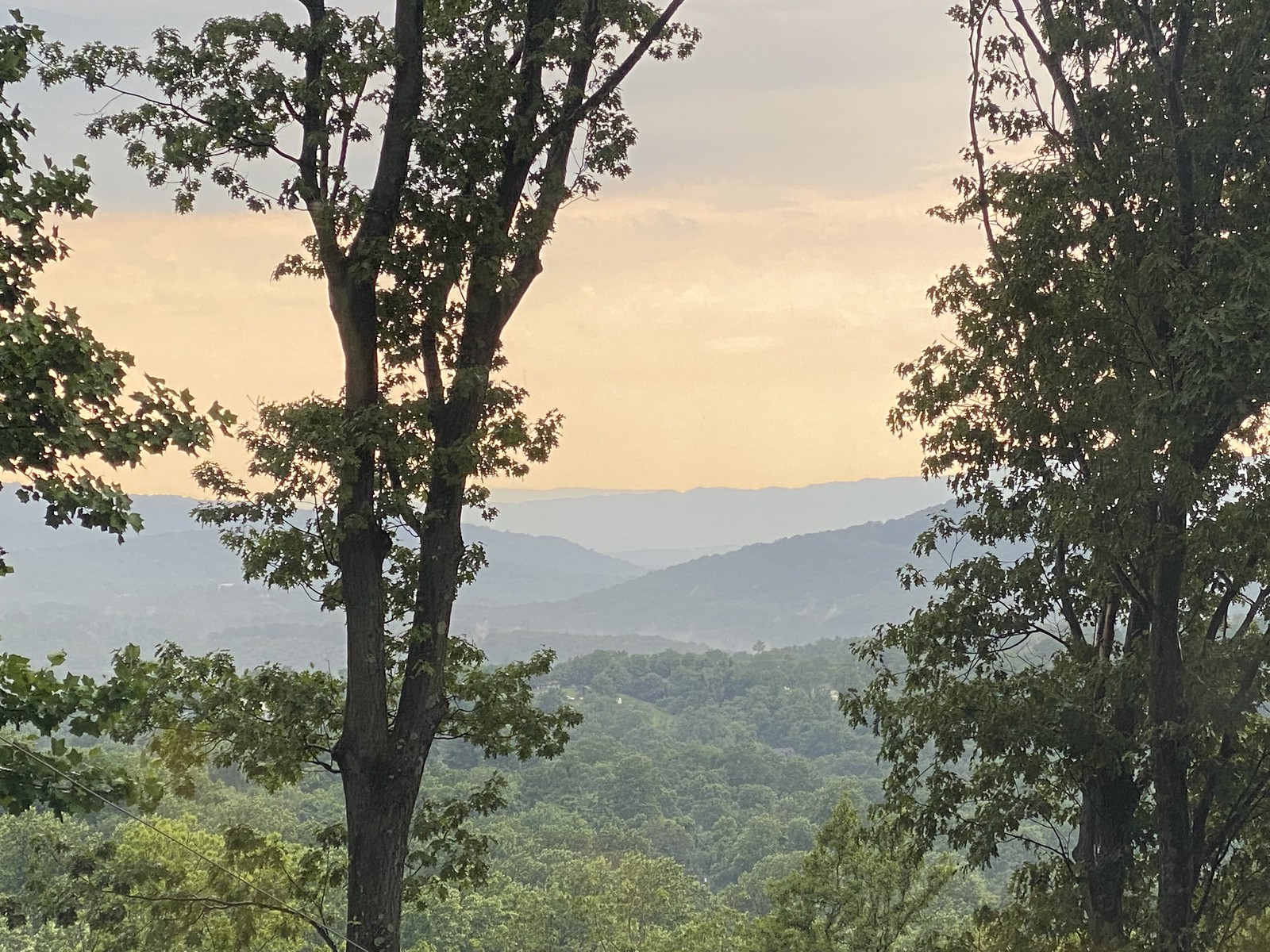
View from Apple Mountain Lake, ©Michael Porterfield

Apple Mountain Lake is a census-designated place in Warren County, Virginia, United States. The population as of the 2010 Census was 1,396, and as of the 2020 Census was up to 1,400.

== Demographics ==
Historical population
| Census | Pop. | Note | %± |
|---|---|---|---|
| 2010 | 1,396 | | — |
| 2020 | 1,400 | | 0.3% |
U.S. Decennial Census; 2010 2020

Apple Mountain Lake was first listed as a census designated place in the 2010 U.S. census.
