= Potomac Gardens =

Public housing project in Washington, D.C., United States

- Interactive map of the Potomac Gardens area
- Alternative names: The Gardens

General information
- Type: Housing project
- Location: Capitol Hill, Southeast, 1225 G Street SE, Washington, D.C., United States
- Coordinates: 38.880168°N 76.989270°W
- Groundbreaking: 1965
- Completed: 1968
- Owner: Housing Authority of the District of Columbia

Design and construction
- Architecture firm: Metcalf and Associates
- Main contractor: Edward M. Crough, Inc.
- Awards: Greater Washington Board of Trade Award for Excellence in Architecture (1971)

Other information
- Number of rooms: 352 units

Website
- Housing Authority of the District of Columbia

Potomac Gardens, known to some of its residents as "The Gardens", is a housing project located at 1225 G Street SE, in Capitol Hill, Southeast, Washington, D.C., thirteen blocks to the southeast of the United States Capitol building.

The property is owned by the District of Columbia Housing Authority, and its 352-units are divided into family and senior housing. It was constructed between 1965 and 1968. In the summer of 1967, the first families moved in.

== History ==
Potomac Gardens was designed by the Metcalf and Associates architectural firm, and was built from 1965 and 1968 by Edward M. Crough, Inc. It contained the innovative Potomac Gardens Multi-Service Center, bringing community services into the new public housing project. The Friendship House on Capitol Hill ran the center with the help of site-coordinator S. Preston-Jones and with additional funding from the Junior League. The chief medical officer in the clinic was Dr. John A. Algee. One of the first managers of Potomac Gardens was Majurial Crawley. During the 1980s, Constance Love was the manager.

In 1971, the Greater Washington Board of Trade, the regional business association, gave its Award for Excellence in Architecture to the architectural firm, Metcalf and Associates, and the builder, Edward M. Crough, Inc., of Potomac Gardens. The Edward M. Crough Center for Architectural Studies at Catholic University is named after Potomac Gardens' builder. In 1974, Potomac Gardens was featured in the American Institute of Architects' A Guide to the Architecture of Washington, DC: Twenty Walking and Motoring Tours of Washington and the Vicinity. Potomac Gardens was part of the guide's Southeast Washington tour.

Many of the earliest residents had escaped the harsh life of agricultural work, especially cotton picking, in the South. As part of the City Lights Program funded by the DC Humanities Council, senior residents worked with curators and public historians to create a traveling museum exhibition and a documentary about their historical experiences. Many musicians and bands have emerged from Potomac Gardens, including The East Coast Connection with its single "Summer in the Parks" and, more recently, SouljaGanG Bilal. Potomac Gardens also figures in numerous novels, such as James Patterson's Cross (2006) and George Pelecanos' The Cut (2011).

Former White House aide Lieutenant Colonel Oliver North, USMC, performed some of his court-ordered 1,200 hours of community service there before his Iran-Contra conviction was overturned.

In April 1989, Jesse Jackson along with Mayor Marion Barry visited Potomac Gardens, where they played a one-on-one basketball game. Jackson was considering running for District Mayor, if Barry chose not to run. In 1991, after meeting privately with supporters from around the country at the Omni Shoreham Hotel, Jackson returned to Potomac Gardens by Metro and delivered his formal withdrawal from the Presidential race.

Also in April 1989, Geraldo Rivera featured Potomac Gardens during a segment for his TV talk show, called “Bloodied Streets and Broken Dreams.” As part of the show, Geraldo referred to that block as the most dangerous in America.

== Community life ==
In 1995, Little Lights Urban Ministries was founded by Steven Park, serving children in Potomac Gardens and the surrounding area. In Faith Forward, Steven and Mary Park discuss their religious conversions and the importance of Potomac Gardens' residents to their religious work. Potomac Garden resident, Khaulysha, was profiled in a June 2014 article on the success of the Little Lights program.

In 2013, Liane Scott brought Grassroots DC to Potomac Gardens to provide training in journalism and media production to residents, who then go on to produce information to educate policy makers and the public about issues and causes vital to the under-served communities of the District of Columbia Metropolitan Area.

The Senior Resident Council was established in 1979 "to foster and improve relationships within the development and with the surrounding community." The Senior Resident Council organizes activities for seniors and provides assistance during emergencies. In the early 1990s, it worked with the group City Lights, and with funding from the DC Humanities Council and National Endowment for the Humanities, to make a video about the lives of seniors in Potomac Gardens. In connection to this project, some of the seniors testified before Congress in support of NEH funding.

== Controversy and crime ==
In 1983, Martha Queen, the ANC representative for the area and herself a resident of Potomac Gardens for more than a decade, said: “I like it here. I like the people. I don't like the problems. But the people are good people. But There's a lot of trespassers here.” Deteriorating conditions in some parts of the complex, Queen said, gave the impression that the project had been "abandoned" by the city and was ripe for invasion by outsiders.

In 1991, Mayor Sharon Pratt Kelly had fences installed around and within the property to halt trespassers, but this action was controversial. Some residents did not want the fences. "It’s disrespectful. We aren’t animals. We don’t need to be caged," one resident told The Washington Post. It took 45 police officers to quell a violent negative reaction. Mayor Kelly was vindicated, at least in the short term: Drug arrests declined dramatically after the fence went up, though crimes did continue. But much of the drug activity just shifted to other areas, and assaults and robberies remained high—to the point in 1995 that Marion Barry’s administration hired the Nation of Islam on an emergency contract to restore order.

Jesse Jackson used Potomac Gardens as a backdrop for a press conference to announce he would not run for president in 1992, calling it “the urban crisis personified, the epitome of national neglect.”

In June 2010, fifteen individuals were arrested, according to a joint press release issued in conjunction with the U.S. Attorney's office, the MPDC, the FBI and the U.S. Park Police, who all worked together on the arrests as part of a long-term task force combating gangs, drugs and violence. The bust yielded heroin, cocaine, guns, scales and other drug trafficking paraphernalia and was described as significant by the MPD1 Commander David Kamperin. In November 2011, a series of violent attacks in the area surrounding the project drew widespread media attention and a response from DC Police Chief Cathy Lanier. The FBI announced in July 2013 that sixteen people had been arrested in drug conspiracy charges, "According to the government’s evidence, the drugs were distributed in the Potomac Gardens and Hopkins housing complexes in Southeast Washington, as well as in Prince George’s County, Maryland, and locations in Northern Virginia."

In a March 2013 article in Education Week, Potomac Garden resident Kourtney Mills said, "I was lucky," because she only waited 5 years to move into Potomac Gardens and found stability there while she studied full-time in a medical-technician program. In March 2013, the Huffington Post met with a group of teens and young adults at Potomac Gardens where they discussed their own encounters with violence and guns outside of Potomac Gardens (in other parts of Washington, DC).

On June 24, 2013, Tywayne Thompson, 25, died from gunshot wounds while visiting the housing complex. Carlos Parks, 19, pleaded guilty to second-degree murder while armed. A series of shootings in Spring of 2015 at Potomac Gardens, including shots fired at EMS and police, prompted renewed concern from area residents, yet violent crimes continued to increase. In the summer of 2016, residents reported nearly nightly sounds of gunfire and multiple people were shot in the complex and the adjacent park. In November 2016, a 40-year-old man was stabbed to death at 7pm on a Sunday night. The homicide remains under investigation. Then, on November 25, 2016, Sixteen-year-old Breyona McMillian was fatally shot at 11:40 a.m. in the courtyard of Potomac Gardens. The matter is under investigation. On Monday, May 1, 2017, gunman opened fire with assault weapons into Potomac Gardens at 6:45 PM. More than 30 shots were fired down the sidewalk, forcing kids and families to duck and run for cover. Due to the brazen nature of the shootings, the situation was covered by all local media outlets and the Washington Post. Wayne Tucker, who has lived in Potomac Gardens for six years, said residents live in fear. "You always worry. Why wouldn't you worry? I'm hoping it's not my day."

== Proposed redevelopment ==
There has been speculation that the housing project would be redeveloped using federal funds through the HOPE VI or the Choice Neighborhood programs to create mixed-income housing. The 2006 Washington, D.C. city budget included funding for "A joint venture redevelopment between DCHA and a private developer to do a one-for-one replacement of 510 units of public housing located in the present Potomac Gardens and Hopkins Plaza developments. The proposed redevelopment will be a mixed income rental and home ownership containing 510 replacements units out of a total 1,230 units located on the two public housing sites and in the adjoining neighborhood." In a 2010, a team of students from the University of Pennsylvania School of Design proposed a redesign of Potomac Gardens and nearby Hopkins Apartments to deal with "a now outdated model of public housing design, the buildings are conspicuous and isolated from the neighborhood context." On June 7, 2012, the Washington, D.C. Housing Authority issued a statement on potential redevelopment of the housing project, stating "We considered several sites for our HUD HOPE VI applications. We chose Capper/Carrollsburg, which was selected and received a HOPE VI grant for $34.9M. We do not have plans to redevelop Potomac Gardens at this time." Other speculation has circulated that Potomac Gardens was slated to be sold for use as additional U.S. Marine barracks, as the location is one of only a few locations meeting the criteria set forth by the U.S. Marine Corps.

There is concern among the Potomac Garden residents that redevelopment will displace them. A January 2015 segment on WAMU discussed the future of Potomac Gardens, including redevelopment efforts. One resident Leila Williams voiced her fears of being displaced: “They will probably be asking us to vacate sooner or later, you know, which I hope they don’t!”

== See also ==
- HOPE VI
- List of public housing developments in the United States
- Public housing in the United States
