= Shenandoah Farms, Virginia =

- Census-designated place
- Location within the Commonwealth of Virginia Shenandoah Farms (Virginia) Shenandoah Farms (the United States)
- Coordinates: 38°58′51″N 78°2′47″W
- Country: United States
- State: Virginia
- County: Clarke

Area
  - Total: 11.5 sq mi (29.7 km^{2})
  - Land: 11.3 sq mi (29.3 km^{2})
  - Water: 0.15 sq mi (0.4 km^{2})
- Elevation: 801 ft (244 m)

Population (2010)
  - Total: 3,033
  - Density: 268/sq mi (103.4/km^{2})
- Time zone: UTC−5 (Eastern (EST))
  - Summer (DST): UTC−4 (EDT)
- ZIP codes: 22630, 22642
- FIPS code: 51-71810
- GNIS feature ID: 2629750

Shenandoah Farms is an unincorporated community and census-designated place in northeastern Warren County, Virginia, United States. A small portion extends into neighboring Clarke County. As of the 2020 census, Shenandoah Farms had a population of 4,135. It is a recreational community built on the western slope of Blue Ridge Mountain and the banks of the Shenandoah River.

== Demographics ==
Historical population
Census	Pop.	Note	%±
2010	3,033		—
2020	4,135		36.3%
U.S. Decennial Census; 2010 2020

=== 2020 census ===
As of the 2020 census, Shenandoah Farms had a population of 4,135. The median age was 38.3 years. 23.8% of residents were under the age of 18 and 10.7% of residents were 65 years of age or older. For every 100 females there were 108.0 males, and for every 100 females age 18 and over there were 106.5 males age 18 and over.

0.0% of residents lived in urban areas, while 100.0% lived in rural areas.

There were 1,609 households in Shenandoah Farms, of which 32.6% had children under the age of 18 living in them. Of all households, 52.5% were married-couple households, 23.4% were households with a male householder and no spouse or partner present, and 14.5% were households with a female householder and no spouse or partner present. About 22.6% of all households were made up of individuals and 5.3% had someone living alone who was 65 years of age or older.

There were 1,800 housing units, of which 10.6% were vacant. The homeowner vacancy rate was 1.4% and the rental vacancy rate was 6.6%.

Racial composition as of the 2020 census
Race	Number	Percent
White	3,622	87.6%
Black or African American	79	1.9%
American Indian and Alaska Native	16	0.4%
Asian	34	0.8%
Native Hawaiian and Other Pacific Islander	0	0.0%
Some other race	95	2.3%
Two or more races	289	7.0%
Hispanic or Latino (of any race)	264	6.4%

=== 2010 census ===
Shenandoah Farms was first listed as a census designated place in the 2010 U.S. census.
