= Warren County Economic Development Authority =

Development authority in Virginia

The Front Royal-Warren County Industrial Development Authority (also known as the Economic Development Authority or WCEDA) is an independent economic development agency in Warren County, Virginia. It was created pursuant to Virginia state law and is headquartered in Front Royal, Virginia. It is jointly funded by the town of Front Royal and the county of Warren.

The purpose of the WCEDA is to foster and stimulate industry and economic development within Warren County and the town of Front Royal.

== History ==
The WCEDA was authorized on December 20, 1994, by an act of the Virginia General Assembly and derives its power from the Front Royal Town Council and the Board of Supervisors of Warren County, Virginia. Its stated goal is to expand investment and create jobs, and since it was established in the mid-1990s it has created over 2,500 jobs and generated $500 million in investments in the Route 340/522 corridor. The work of the WCEDA became especially salient for the region's residents after the closure of its largest taxpayer and employer, Avtex, following severe environmental contamination issues at its main plant, including wastewater runoff into the Shenandoah River and clean air violations. Most notable among the development activities undertaken by the agency are the successful repatriation of the former Avtex plant, which had been made into an EPA Superfund site following its closure. The site, which the EPA returned to the control of the WCEDA in 2014, was successfully remediated and became the agency gained control of 162 acres of industrial plant site, 240 acres of conservation land, and 34 acres devoted to recreational activities. The remediation work was coordinated between the WCEDA and several outside entities, including the U.S. Army Corps of Engineers, the EPA, and the FMC Corporation, a chemical manufacturing firm based in Philadelphia.

The WCEDA has been credited with attracting new businesses and investment activity to the Front Royal-Warren County area, including the restaurateur Chick-Fil-A, the hotel chain Marriott, and a brewing company.

In 2019, the WCEDA became embroiled in what some have described as the largest embezzlement scandal in Virginia history. The scandal involved a massive embezzlement scheme involving a director of the WCEDA, a Washington-area developer, and numerous other local government officials and their associates. According to the allegations, the developer falsely promised to build a data center and retail complex that would attract 600 jobs and fund other development within the county. The project never materialized, but was instead used as a vehicle to embezzle $21 million in funds.

The fraud scheme was uncovered by the Virginia State Police Bureau of Criminal Investigation's Culpeper Field Office, which launched a probe in 2018 into the business practices of the EDA in conjunction with the Front Royal Police Department and the Federal Bureau of Investigation.

In the fallout of the scandal, 14 current and former municipal officials were indicted and are facing criminal charges, including the entire Warren County board of supervisors as well as the former Warren County Attorney and the head of the Warren County schools division. In addition to the criminal cases, civil lawsuits were filed by the Town of Front Royal seeking $15 million in damages from the WCEDA and the former directors. A special grand jury has been appointed to investigate the matter.

== Organizational structure ==
=== Board of directors ===
The authority is governed by a seven-member board of directors, appointed by the Board of Supervisors of Warren County. The board meets on a monthly basis but additional meetings can be called by any two directors on an ad hoc basis.

=== Officers ===
The Board is led by a chairman, chosen from among the directors by the other directors. Other officers include a vice-chairman, a secretary, an assistant secretary, and a treasurer. The chairman and the other officers serve for one fiscal year, with elections taking place during the last regular meeting of each fiscal year.

The Board can also create executive committees which are composed of the chairman, vice-chairman, secretary, treasurer, and additional members as chosen by the Board.

== See also ==
- Fairfax County Economic Development Authority - Another local EDA in northern Virginia
