= Michael K. Fauntroy =

American political scientist

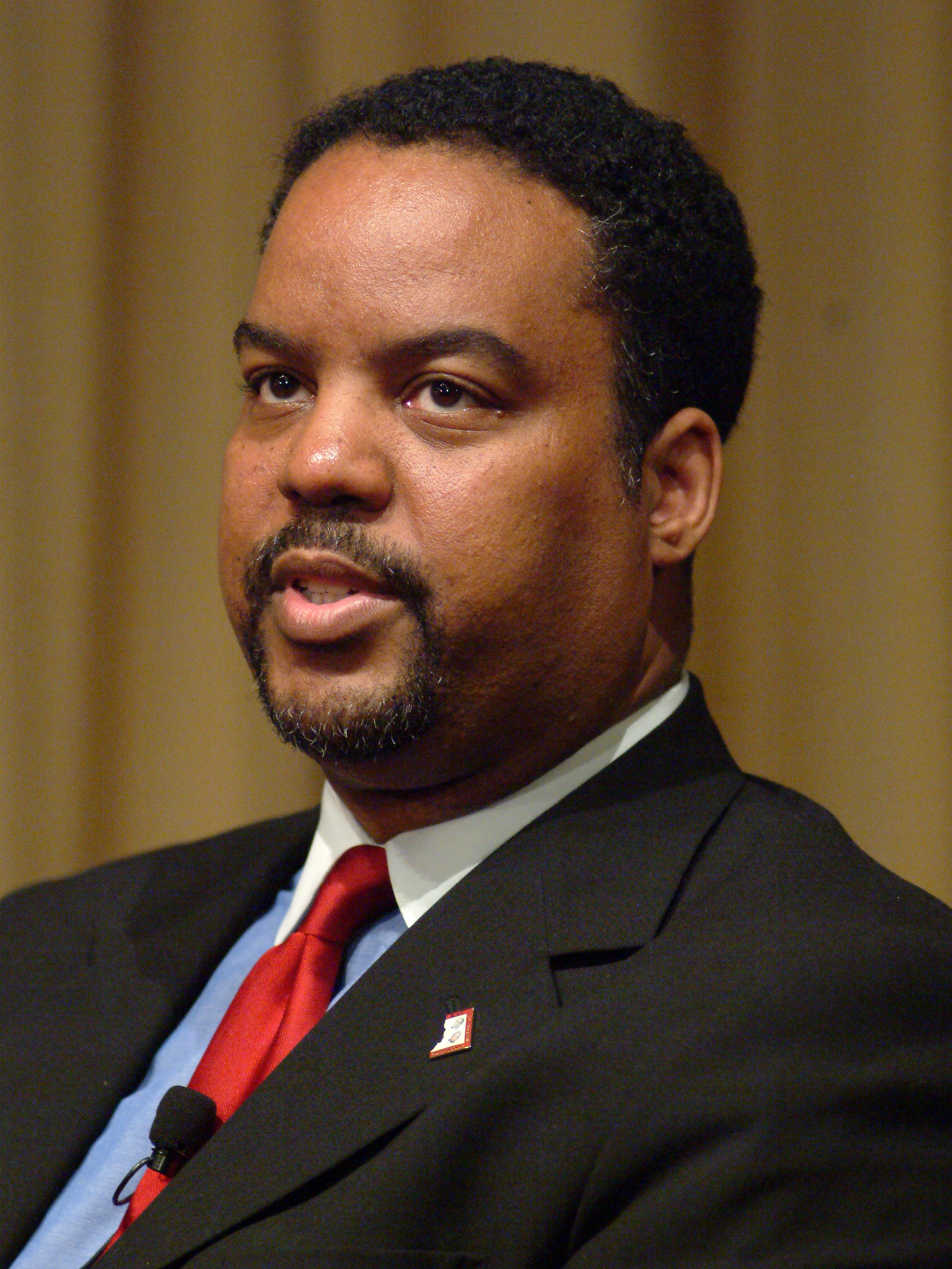
- Fauntroy in 2010
- Education: Hampton University; Howard University
- Scientific career
- Fields: Political science
- Workplaces: United States Commission on Civil Rights; Congressional Research Service; American University; University of the District of Columbia; Trinity College; George Mason University; Howard University

Michael K. Fauntroy is an American political scientist. He was formerly a professor in the political science department at Howard University, where he has also been the associate chair. In 2018 he became the acting director of the Ronald W. Walters Leadership and Public Policy Center at Howard University. He studies African American politics, interest groups, and American political parties and partisanship. In 2021, he takes on a new role at George Mason University where he previously spent 11 years at prior to Howard. He has published books on the struggle for self-governance in Washington, D.C., and the relationship between African American voters and the Republican Party.

== Education and positions ==
Fauntroy attended Hampton University, where he obtained a BA degree in political science. He then attended graduate school at Howard University, earning an MA degree in Public Affairs followed by a PhD in political science, with a focus on American government and African American political behavior.

From 1993 to 1996, Fauntroy was a Civil Rights Analyst at The United States Commission on Civil Rights. Between 1998 and 2001, he taught at American University, The University of the District of Columbia, Trinity College, and Howard University. During those years he was also an analyst at The Congressional Research Service. In 2002 Fauntroy joined the faculty at George Mason University. In 2013, he moved to Howard University.

== Research ==
Fauntroy has published several academic books. In 2003, he published Home Rule or House Rule? Congress and the Erosion of Local Governance in the District of Columbia. In Home Rule or House Rule?, Fauntroy studies the struggle for self-governance in Washington DC, which is subject to the jurisdiction of the United States Congress under District of Columbia home rule without having any voting representation in Congress. Fauntroy argues that the home rule of Washington, DC has eroded local governance, largely because DC is subject to partisan fighting within the federal government. Fauntroy also points to specific instances in which the congressional representatives of DC's suburban neighbors have used their congressional powers to the detriment of the District, and in many cases Fauntroy argues this was motivated by racial animus.

In 2007, Fauntroy published Republicans and the Black Vote, which was reprinted as a paperback in 2008. In Republicans and the Black Vote, Fauntroy studies the developments that caused the Republican Party to slide from nearly unanimous support among African Americans during The Reconstruction era to nearly unanimous opposition in the 21st century. The book presents a history of the relationship between the Republican Party and African American voters, from the party's founding through the New Deal era to the early 2000s, with a particularly in-depth focus on the four decades starting around 1970. Fauntroy demonstrates that the beginnings of African American voters' near-unanimous rejection of the Republican Party, to the extent that regularly only single digit percentages of African American voters cast ballots for the GOP, only began in 1964 with the candidacy of Barry Goldwater and the ideological clarification of the two major American parties. This was the culmination of a longer trend in which the party identification of African American voters had been steadily shifting towards the Democratic Party for decades, with about two thirds of African American voters supporting the Democratic Party during the New Deal. In Republicans and the Black Vote, Fauntroy studies why this shift happened, supplementing his historical analysis by interviewing Republican policy makers and African American members of the Republican Party. Fauntroy argues that the movement of African Americans away from the GOP was caused both by the clarification of Republican policy stances that are at odds with the priorities of many African American voters, as well as the Republican Party's usage of racially charged symbolism and rhetoric throughout a series of election campaigns. Fauntroy therefore attributes the very low levels of support for the Republican Party among African American voters both to the GOP's public policy and to its political strategy. Republicans and the Black Vote was a finalist for the Foreword Magazine Book of the Year Award in 2007.

Fauntroy has been interviewed, or his work has been cited, in media outlets including The New York Times, The Washington Post, Time, and Newshub. Fauntroy has also appeared frequently on C-SPAN and CTV News. Fauntroy has been a regular contributor to HuffPost, publishing dozens of articles there over more than a decade after 2006. The United States House of Representatives delegate and Civil Rights leader Walter Fauntroy is Michael Fauntroy's uncle.

== Selected works ==
- Home Rule or House Rule? Congress and the Erosion of Local Governance in the District of Columbia (2003)
- Republicans and the Black Vote (2007)
