= Ashby, Warren County, Virginia =

Ashby
- Unincorporated community
- Location within the Commonwealth of Virginia Ashby (Virginia) Ashby (the United States)
- Coordinates: 39°00′39″N 78°08′07″W
- Country: United States
- State: Virginia
- County: Warren
- Time zone: UTC−5 (Eastern (EST))
  - Summer (DST): UTC−4 (EDT)
- ZIP codes: 22630
- Area code: 540

Ashby is an unincorporated community in Warren County, Virginia, United States. It sits at an elevation of 597 feet (182 m).
