= Warren County, Virginia =

County in Virginia, United States

- County
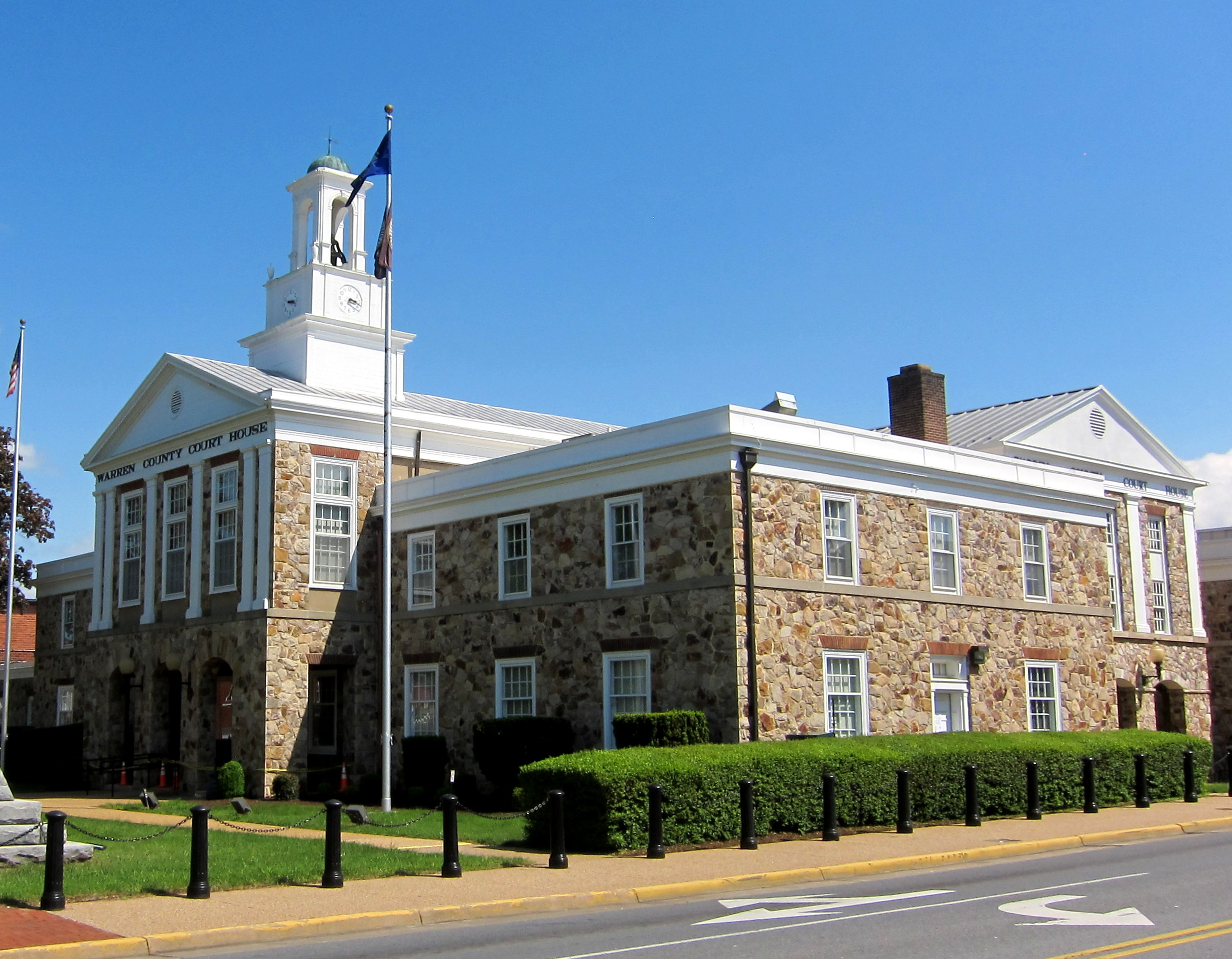
- Warren County Courthouse in Front Royal, Virginia

- Flag Seal Logo

- Location within the U.S. state of Virginia
- Coordinates: 38°55′N 78°13′W
- Country: United States
- State: Virginia
- Founded: 1836
- Named for: Joseph Warren
- Seat: Front Royal
- Largest town: Front Royal

Area
  - Total: 217 sq mi (560 km^{2})
  - Land: 213 sq mi (550 km^{2})
  - Water: 3.3 sq mi (8.5 km^{2}) 1.5%

Population (2020)
  - Total: 40,727
  - Estimate (2025): 42,740 ▲
  - Density: 191/sq mi (73.8/km^{2})
- Time zone: UTC−5 (Eastern)
  - Summer (DST): UTC−4 (EDT)
- Congressional district: 6th
- Website: www.warrencountyva.gov

Warren County is a U.S. county located in the Commonwealth of Virginia. The 2020 United States census places Warren County within the Washington-Arlington-Alexandria, DC-VA-MD-WV Metropolitan Statistical Area with a population of 40,727. The county was established in 1836. The county seat is Front Royal.

== History ==
By 1672, the entire Shenandoah Valley was claimed for hunting by the Iroquois Confederation following the Beaver Wars. Some bands of the Shawnee settled in the area as client groups to the Iroquois and alternately to the Cherokee after 1721. The Iroquois formally sold their entire claim east of the Alleghenies to the Virginia Colony at the Treaty of Lancaster in 1744. Warren County was established in 1836 from Frederick and Shenandoah Counties. At that time the county had a population of 7,000 people, a quarter of which were enslaved. Wedding records show marriages of people born in the 1770s marrying in the 1800s who head households of four to eight "free colored" so the early demographics of the population are unclear. Joist Hite lead the Sixteen Families into the Lower Shenandoah Valley. Some consider that group the first European settlers of the area, others believe different claims. Either way, Presbyterians of Scotch-Irish lineage and Quakers followed.

Rail service was established in 1854 with the construction of the Alexandria, Orange and Manassas Gap Railroad between Manassas and Riverton. This line was soon extended to Strasburg in time to become a factor in the Battle of Front Royal on May 23, 1862, and throughout the Civil War. Lumber, agriculture, manufacturing and grain mills provided employment in the region for decades after the Civil War. The county is named for Joseph Warren. During the Civil War the Battle of Front Royal took place in the county on May 23, 1862. On September 23, 1864, William Thomas Overby and five others of then Lt. Col. John S. Mosby's 43rd Virginia Battalion of Partisan Rangers were captured by cavalry troops under the command of then Brig. Gen. George A. Custer in Front Royal out of uniform and were executed as spies.

=== 2019 Economic Development Authority scandal ===
In 2017, questions were raised about the validity of an alleged $40 million economic development deal that had been brought to the community by Curt Tran, the owner of a company called IT Federal, over the redevelopment of the Avtex Superfund site.

In 2018, Warren County Economic Development Authority executive director Jennifer McDonald was charged with filing false police reports about an alleged rock-throwing incident that she claimed had occurred at her home.

In 2019, McDonald and other parties were embroiled in a massive financial scandal that some observers have characterized as the largest embezzlement scheme in the history of the state of Virginia. The fraud scheme, which involved the alleged embezzlement of $21 million in county funds through fictitious development schemes and insider deals, was uncovered by the Virginia State Police Bureau of Criminal Investigation's Culpeper field office.

The Virginia State Police launched a probe into the business practices of McDonald in conjunction with the Front Royal Police Department and the Federal Bureau of Investigation.

Sheriff McEathron, who had been indicted after it was revealed he was McDonald's business partner, committed suicide.

Jennifer McDonald was charged with 32 felony counts for her role in the scheme. Fourteen current and former municipal officials were indicted and faced criminal charges, including the entire Warren County board of supervisors as well as the former Warren County Attorney and the head of the Warren County schools division. These charges were later dropped as the judge ruled there was no basis for the allegations.

== Geography ==
Warren and adjacent counties

According to the U.S. Census Bureau, the county has a total area of 217 square miles (560 km^{2}), of which 213 square miles (550 km^{2}) is land and 3.3 square miles (8.5 km^{2}) (1.5%) is water. The highest point is Hogback Mountain in Shenandoah National Park, along the border with Rappahannock County.

=== Adjacent counties ===
- Frederick County – north
- Clarke County – northeast
- Fauquier County – east
- Rappahannock County – southeast
- Page County – southwest
- Shenandoah County – west

=== National protected areas ===
- Cedar Creek and Belle Grove National Historical Park (part)
- George Washington National Forest (part)
- Shenandoah National Park (part)

== Demographics ==
Historical population
Census	Pop.	Note	%±
1840	5,627		—
1850	6,607		17.4%
1860	6,442		−2.5%
1870	5,716		−11.3%
1880	7,399		29.4%
1890	8,280		11.9%
1900	8,837		6.7%
1910	8,589		−2.8%
1920	8,852		3.1%
1930	8,340		−5.8%
1940	11,352		36.1%
1950	14,801		30.4%
1960	14,655		−1.0%
1970	15,301		4.4%
1980	21,200		38.6%
1990	26,142		23.3%
2000	31,584		20.8%
2010	37,575		19.0%
2020	40,727		8.4%
2025 (est.)	42,740	▲	4.9%
U.S. Decennial Census; 1790–1960 1900–1990; 1990–2000 2010 2020

=== Racial and ethnic composition ===
Warren County, Virginia – Racial and ethnic composition Note: the US Census treats Hispanic/Latino as an ethnic category. This table excludes Latinos from the racial categories and assigns them to a separate category. Hispanics/Latinos may be of any race.
Race / Ethnicity (NH = Non-Hispanic)	Pop 1980	Pop 1990	Pop 2000	Pop 2010	Pop 2020	% 1980	% 1990	% 2000	% 2010	% 2020
White alone (NH)	19,726	24,492	28,947	33,345	33,831	93.05%	93.69%	91.65%	88.74%	83.07%
Black or African American alone (NH)	1,182	1,286	1,514	1,709	1,722	5.58%	4.92%	4.79%	4.55%	4.23%
Native American or Alaska Native alone (NH)	23	45	79	103	130	0.11%	0.17%	0.25%	0.27%	0.32%
Asian alone (NH)	56	68	135	350	462	0.26%	0.26%	0.43%	0.93%	1.13%
Native Hawaiian or Pacific Islander alone (NH)	x	x	6	7	13	x	x	0.02%	0.02%	0.03%
Other race alone (NH)	19	3	42	35	255	0.09%	0.01%	0.13%	0.09%	0.63%
Mixed race or Multiracial (NH)	x	x	367	708	1,901	x	x	1.16%	1.88%	4.67%
Hispanic or Latino (any race)	194	248	494	1,318	2,413	0.92%	0.95%	1.56%	3.51%	5.92%
Total	21,200	26,142	31,584	37,575	40,727	100.00%	100.00%	100.00%	100.00%	100.00%

=== 2020 census ===
As of the 2020 census, the county had a population of 40,727. The median age was 40.9 years. 22.1% of residents were under the age of 18 and 17.0% of residents were 65 years of age or older. For every 100 females there were 101.2 males, and for every 100 females age 18 and over there were 99.0 males age 18 and over.

The racial makeup of the county was 84.4% White, 4.3% Black or African American, 0.5% American Indian and Alaska Native, 1.2% Asian, 0.0% Native Hawaiian and Pacific Islander, 2.5% from some other race, and 7.1% from two or more races. Hispanic or Latino residents of any race comprised 5.9% of the population.

39.8% of residents lived in urban areas, while 60.2% lived in rural areas.

There were 15,322 households in the county, of which 30.2% had children under the age of 18 living with them and 22.9% had a female householder with no spouse or partner present. About 25.2% of all households were made up of individuals and 10.6% had someone living alone who was 65 years of age or older.

There were 16,739 housing units, of which 8.5% were vacant. Among occupied housing units, 76.0% were owner-occupied and 24.0% were renter-occupied. The homeowner vacancy rate was 1.6% and the rental vacancy rate was 5.7%.

=== 2000 Census ===
As of the census of 2000, there were 31,584 people, 12,087 households, and 8,521 families residing in the county. The population density was 148 inhabitants per square mile (57/km^{2}). There were 13,299 housing units at an average density of 62 units per square mile (24 units/km^{2}). The demographics of the county is (2000) 92.71% White, 4.83% Black or African American, 0.27% Native American, 0.43% Asian, 0.02% Pacific Islander, 0.46% from other races, and 1.29% from two or more races. 1.56% of the population were Hispanic or Latino of any race.

There were 12,087 households, out of which 32.80% had children under the age of 18 living with them, 55.60% were married couples living together, 10.00% had a female householder with no husband present, and 29.50% were non-families. 24.00% of all households were made up of individuals, and 8.80% had someone living alone who was 65 years of age or older. The average household size was 2.57 and the average family size was 3.04.

In the county, the population was spread out, with 25.60% under the age of 18, 7.60% from 18 to 24, 30.60% from 25 to 44, 23.90% from 45 to 64, and 12.30% who were 65 years of age or older. The median age was 37 years. For every 100 females, there were 96.70 males. For every 100 females aged 18 and over, there were 94.90 males.

The median income for a household in the county was $42,422, and the median income for a family was $50,487. Males had a median income of $37,182 versus $25,506 for females. The per capita income for the county was $19,841. About 6.00% of families and 8.50% of the population were below the poverty line, including 8.70% of those under age 18 and 10.40% of those age 65 or over.

== Economy ==
For many years, Avtex Fibers (formerly known as the American Viscose Corporation from 1910 to 1976), was the county's largest employer and taxpayer. At its height, it employed over 800 residents throughout Front Royal and Warren County.

Towards the late 1980s, however, the company's main plant in Front Royal was forced to close as a result of numerous environmental violations, which eventually resulted in the site being declared a Superfund site. The county, reeling from the sudden loss of jobs and tax revenue, established the Warren County Economic Development Authority (WCEDA) to stimulate and diversify its economy as well as the economy of Town of Front Royal, its county seat. The purpose of the WCEDA is to foster and stimulate industry and economic development within Warren County and the town of Front Royal.

=== Top employers ===
According to the county's comprehensive annual financial reports, the top employers by number of employees in the county are the following.

Employer	Employees (2021)
Warren County School Board	750–1,000
Family Dollar Services	250–499
Valley Health System–WMH	250–499
Axalta Coating Systems (DuPont)	250–499
Walmart	250–499
Warren County Government	250–499
Sysco Northeast Redistribution	250–499
Randolph-Macon Academy	250–499
UPS Customer Center	250–499

== Transportation ==
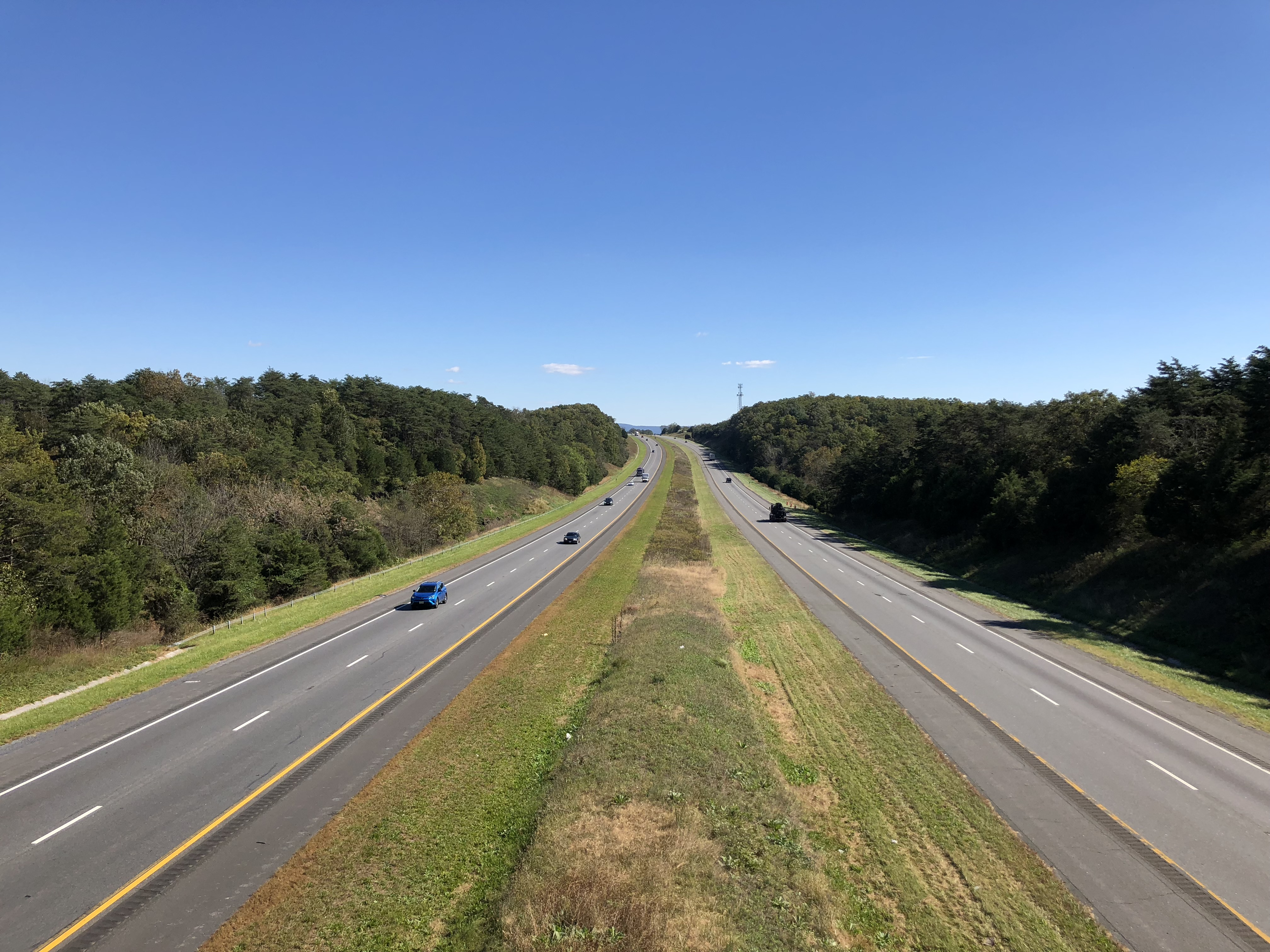
I-66 in Warren County

- Front Royal Area Transit (FRAT) provides weekday transit for the town of Front Royal.
- Page County Transit - the People Movers provides weekday transit for the town of Luray and weekday service between Luray and Front Royal.

=== Major highways ===
- I-66
- I-81
- US 11
- US 340
- US 522
- SR 55
- SR 79
- Skyline Drive

== Education ==
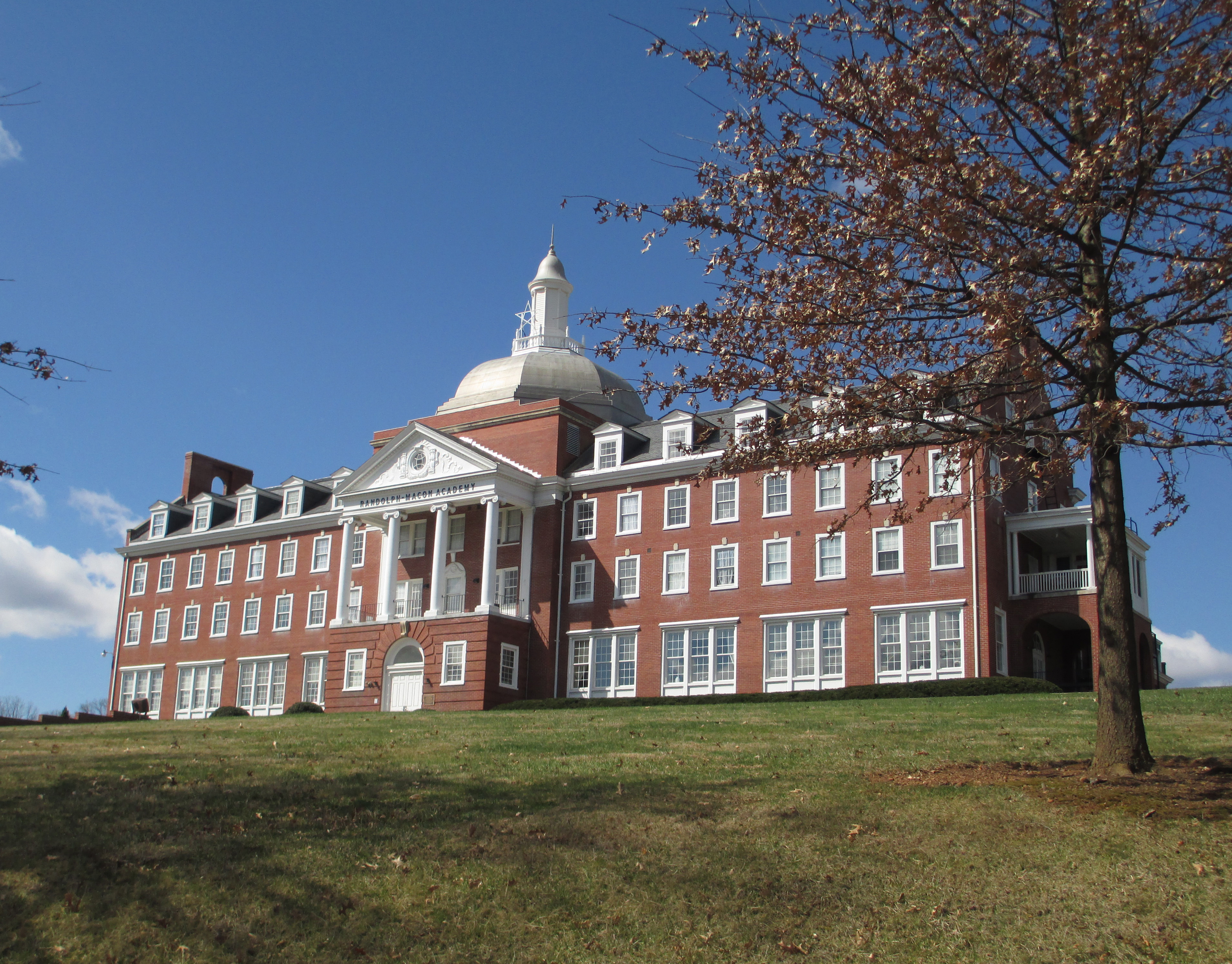
Sonner Hall at Randolph-Macon Academy

=== College ===
- Christendom College

=== Public schools ===
- Skyline High School (9–12)
- Warren County High School (9–12)
- Warren County Middle School (6–8)
- Skyline Middle School (6–8)
- A.S. Rhodes Elementary School (K–5)
- E. Wilson Morrison Elementary School (K–5)
- Hilda J. Barbour Elementary School (PreK–5)
- Leslie Fox Keyser Elementary School (K–5)
- Ressie Jefferies Elementary School (K–5)

=== Preparatory school ===
- Randolph-Macon Academy (6–12)

== Communities ==
=== Town ===
- Front Royal (county seat)

=== Census-designated places ===
- Apple Mountain Lake
- Chester Gap (mostly in Rappahannock County)
- Shenandoah Farms
- Shenandoah Shores
- Skyland Estates

=== Other unincorporated communities ===
- Ashby
- Bentonville
- Bethel
- Browntown
- Buckton
- Cedarville
- Happy Creek
- Howellsville
- Karo
- Limeton
- Linden
- Milldale
- Nineveh
- Overall
- Reliance
- Riverton
- Rockland
- Waterlick

== Politics ==
Prior to 1952, the county was dominated by the Democratic Party like most counties in Virginia, but between then and 1976, it was a swing county. Since 1980, it has become consistently Republican.

United States presidential election results for Warren County, Virginia
Year	Republican		Democratic		Third party(ies)	
Year	No.	%	No.	%	No.	%
1912	122	16.49%	571	77.16%	47	6.35%
1916	214	26.52%	583	72.24%	10	1.24%
1920	293	28.34%	720	69.63%	21	2.03%
1924	150	16.89%	699	78.72%	39	4.39%
1928	564	44.27%	710	55.73%	0	0.00%
1932	367	24.93%	1,096	74.46%	9	0.61%
1936	426	26.56%	1,174	73.19%	4	0.25%
1940	491	26.79%	1,338	73.00%	4	0.22%
1944	761	42.32%	1,034	57.51%	3	0.17%
1948	1,016	40.92%	1,291	51.99%	176	7.09%
1952	1,888	57.90%	1,362	41.77%	11	0.34%
1956	2,003	58.83%	1,322	38.83%	80	2.35%
1960	1,842	49.52%	1,850	49.73%	28	0.75%
1964	1,886	42.96%	2,494	56.81%	10	0.23%
1968	2,297	43.37%	1,513	28.57%	1,486	28.06%
1972	3,718	69.40%	1,508	28.15%	131	2.45%
1976	2,985	45.80%	3,221	49.42%	311	4.77%
1980	3,861	55.79%	2,597	37.53%	462	6.68%
1984	5,016	65.73%	2,551	33.43%	64	0.84%
1988	4,700	61.86%	2,769	36.44%	129	1.70%
1992	4,319	44.64%	3,554	36.73%	1,803	18.63%
1996	4,657	48.25%	3,814	39.52%	1,181	12.24%
2000	6,335	56.73%	4,313	38.63%	518	4.64%
2004	8,600	61.13%	5,241	37.25%	227	1.61%
2008	8,879	55.06%	6,997	43.39%	250	1.55%
2012	9,869	59.10%	6,452	38.64%	377	2.26%
2016	11,773	65.55%	5,169	28.78%	1,018	5.67%
2020	14,069	66.53%	6,603	31.22%	475	2.25%
2024	15,400	67.90%	6,910	30.47%	369	1.63%

== Notable people ==
- Thomas Ashby, born in Warren County, physician and Maryland state legislator
- Thomas M. Allen, born in Warren County, clergyman and university official in Missouri

== See also ==
- National Register of Historic Places listings in Warren County, Virginia
