= Greater Washington Board of Trade =

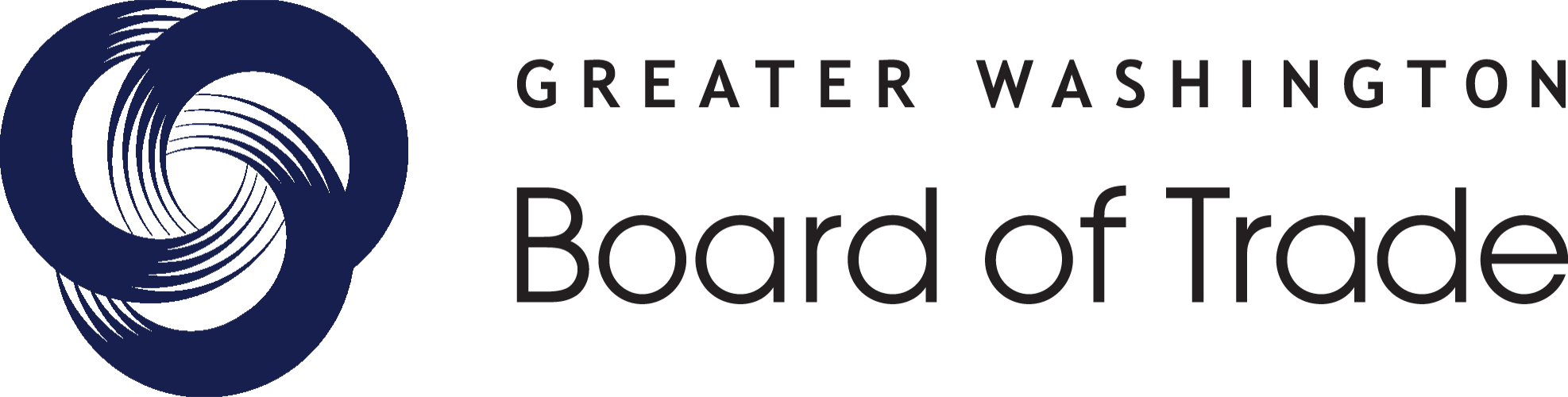
- Formation: 1889
- Purpose: Transportation, Workforce Talent, Technology, Economic Sustainability, Health & Wellness
- Region served: Greater Washington
- President & CEO: Jack McDougle
- Website: https://www.boardoftrade.org

The Greater Washington Board of Trade, founded in 1889, is the region's premier non-partisan membership organization representing various industry sectors that include, businesses, nonprofits, universities, and government agencies in the District of Columbia, suburban Maryland, and Northern Virginia. The organization focuses on inclusive economic growth, improving the region's business climate, and enhancing economic competitiveness across Greater Washington. Notable organizations and companies that are currently a part of the Board of Trade include Wells Fargo, Georgetown University, Bechtel, The Washington Post, AT&T, Pepco, and many other regional, national, and international organizations.

== History ==
Before the creation of the Board of Trade, the District of Columbia did not have a cohesive method of organizing and supporting its cultural infrastructure. Therefore, on November 27, 1889, the Greater Washington Board of Trade was founded after the local paper, The Washington Post, ran an advertisement. The board came into existence as a legal entity on December 2, 1889.

Known as the Board of Trade for the District of Columbia at the time of its creation, the organization was referred locally to as the Washington Board of Trade. During the 70th annual meeting on October 20, 1959, the organization welcomed its first female members when 188 businesswomen were added to the 7,200 total enrollment. The name of the organization was changed to the Metropolitan Washington Board of Trade. At the 90th annual meeting in 1979, the members approved a name change to the Greater Washington Board of Trade. During that meeting, the Board adopted the logo that is still being used today: three interlocking circles that symbolize the unity of Northern Virginia, the District of Columbia, and suburban Maryland.

On November 3, 1992, the Greater Washington Board of Trade challenged the Washington, D.C. law that required employers to provide their at-work employees health insurance to continue to offer the equivalent health insurance coverage for disabled employees who are eligible for workers compensation insurance. On December 14, 1992, the legal decision that the Supreme Court ruled was that states cannot require employers to provide disabled employees the same health insurance with they provide active employees.

The archives of the Greater Washington Board of Trade are housed in the Special Collections Research Center of the Estelle and Melvin Gelman Library at George Washington University.
