= 1855 in art =

Events from the year 1855 in art.

== Events ==
- May 7 – Royal Academy Exhibition of 1855 opens in London
- May 15–November 15 – Exposition Universelle in Paris, including The Salon of 1855 for art. Gustave Courbet, having had several of his paintings rejected, including the monumental The Painter's Studio (L'Atelier du peintre, "a real allegory summing up seven years of my artistic and moral life"), exhibits in a temporary Pavillon du Réalisme adjacent to the official show, creating both public outrage and artistic admiration. The official exhibition includes a retrospective of the paintings of Jean Auguste Dominique Ingres.
- July 3 – John Everett Millais and Effie Gray marry.
- August – Opening of John Leech Gallery, New Zealand's oldest existing art dealership.
- William Bell Scott begins painting murals of Northumbrian history at Wallington Hall.
- The Bavarian National Museum is founded by King Maximilian II of Bavaria.

Courbet – The Painter's Studio

== Awards ==
- Prix de Rome (for sculpture) – Henri-Michel-Antoine Chapu

== Works ==
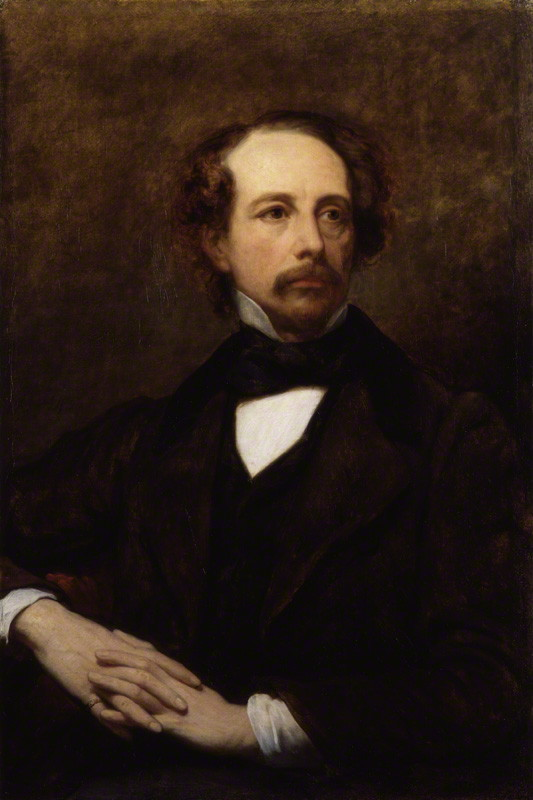
Portrait of Charles Dickens by Ary Scheffer

- Jean-Adolphe Beaucé – The Assault on Zaatcha
- Rosa Bonheur – The Horse Fair (1853–55; Metropolitan Museum of Art, New York)
- Joanna Mary Boyce – Elgiva
- Ford Madox Brown – The Last of England
- William Shakespeare Burton – The Wounded Cavalier
- Philip Hermogenes Calderon – Lord, Thy Will Be Done
- Théodore Chassériau
  - The Defence of the Gauls by Vercingetorix
  - Macbeth and the Three Witches

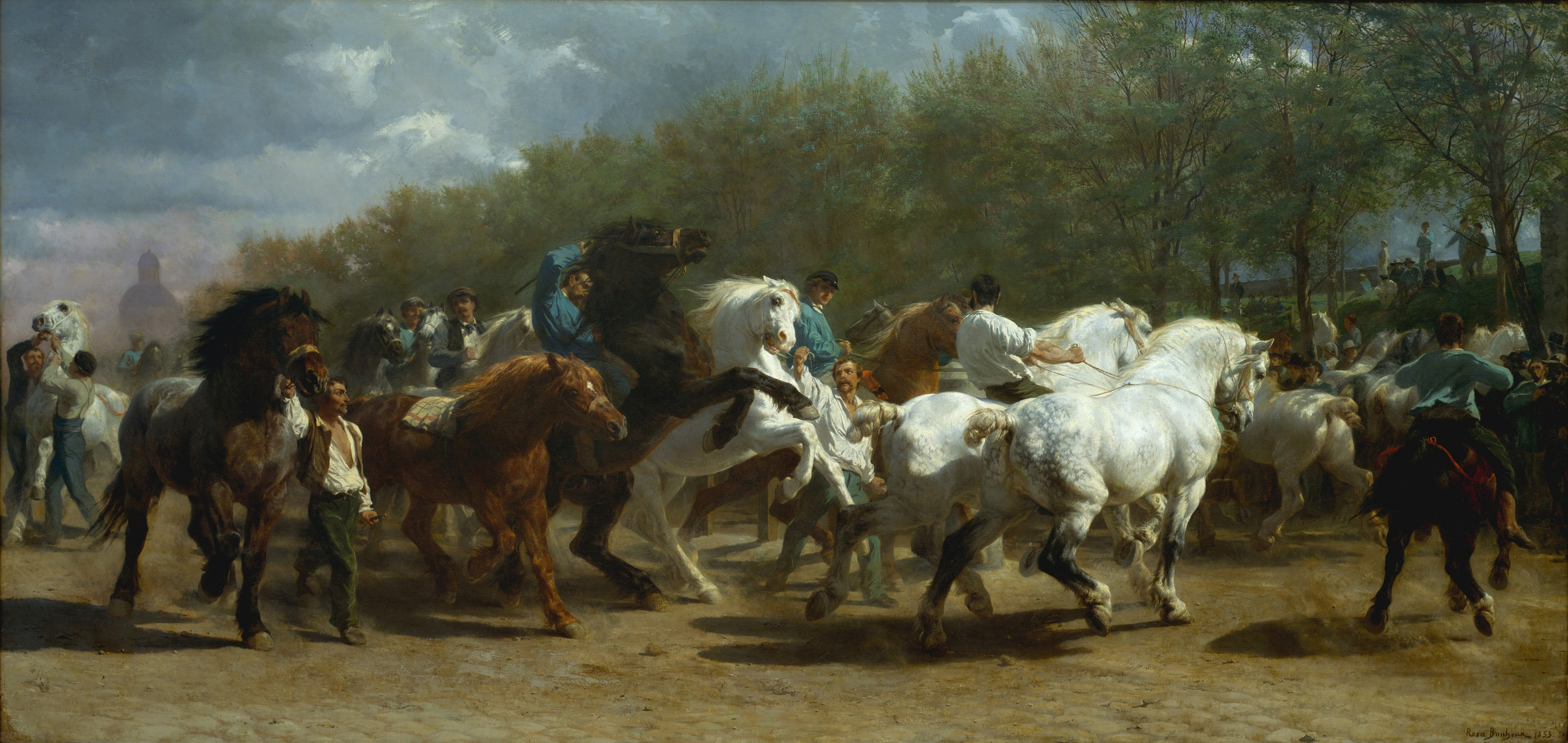
Rosa Bonheur – The Horse Fair

- Edward William Cooke – A North Sea Breeze on the Dutch Coast
- Gustave Courbet – The Artist's Studio (L‘Atelier du Peintre): A Real Allegory of a Seven Year Phase in my Artistic and Moral Life (Musée d'Orsay, Paris)
- Edgar Degas – Self-portrait
- Henry Brueckner - The Marriage of Pocahontas
- William Powell Frith – At the Opera
- Johan Fredrik Höckert – Gudstjänst i Lövmokks fjällkapell
- Paul Huet – The Flood of Saint-Cloud
- George Inness – The Lackawanna Valley
- Elisabeth Jerichau-Baumann – Double portrait of the Brothers Jacob and Wilhelm Grimm
- Eugène Lami – The Battle of the Alma
- Frederic Leighton – Cimabue's Celebrated Madonna (1853-55)
- Robert Braithwaite Martineau – Katherine and Petruchio
- John Jabez Edwin Mayall – Sergeant Dawson and his Daughter (photograph; approximate date)
- Ernest Meissonier – The Brawl
- John Everett Millais – The Rescue
- Élias Robert with Georges Diebolt – France crowning Art and Industry (sculpture for Palais de l'Industrie at Exposition Universelle in Paris)
- José Rodrigues – O Pobre Rabequista
- Ary Scheffer
  - Francesca da Rimini and Paolo Malatesta Appraised by Dante and Virgil (Louvre version)
  - Portrait of Charles Dickens
- Rebecca Solomon – The Story of Balaclava, wherein he spoke of the most disastrous chances
- January Suchodolski – The Death of Cyprian Godebski at Raszyn
- Carl Wahlbom – Death of King Gustav II Adolf at the Battle of Lützen (1632)
- Franz Xaver Winterhalter – The Empress Eugénie Surrounded by her Ladies in Waiting
- Adolphe Yvon – Marshal Ney Supporting the Rear Guard During the Retreat from Moscow

== Births ==
- January 4 – Jean Baptiste Guth, French watercolor portraitist (died 1922)
- January 31 – Karl Uchermann, Norwegian canine painter (died 1940)
- February 11 – Ellen Day Hale, American painter and printmaker (died 1940)
- February 25 – Frederick McCubbin, Australian painter of the Heidelberg School (died 1917)
- March 22 – Dorothy Tennant, English painter (died 1926)
- May 1 – Cecilia Beaux, American portrait painter (died 1942)
- July 30 – James E. Kelly, American sculptor and illustrator (died 1933)
- August 30 – Evelyn De Morgan, English painter (died 1919)
- September 8 – William Friese-Greene, English photographer and cinematographer (died 1921)
- December 25 – Jules Monge, French painter (died 1934)
- Willis E. Davis, American landscape painter (suicide 1910)
- William John Wainwright, English painter (died 1931)

== Deaths ==
- January 19 – Jean-Baptiste Paulin Guérin, French painter (born 1783)
- March 3 – Copley Fielding, painter (born 1787)
- March 20 – Eugénie Charen, French painter (born 1786)
- April 18 – Jean-Baptiste Isabey, painter (born 1767)
- June 9 – Piotr Michałowski, Polish portrait painter (born 1800)
- June 10 – Jacques-Jean Barre, French engraver and designer of French medals, the Great Seal of France, bank notes and postage stamps (born 1793)
- June 24 – Edward Williams, landscape painter (born 1782)
- August 18 – Amasa Hewins – American portrait, genre, and landscape painter (born 1795)
- September 16 – Benedetto Pistrucci, engraver (born 1783)
- October 21 – Henry Pierce Bone, English enamel painter (born 1779)
- November 3 – François Rude, sculptor (born 1784)
- date unknown
  - Dimitrije Avramović, Serbian painter (born 1815).
  - Angelus de Baets, Belgian painter of portraits and architectural subjects (born 1793)
  - Giovanni Paolo Lasinio, Italian engraver (born 1796)
  - Johann Georg Primavesi, German etcher and painter, primarily of landscapes (born 1774)
  - Wendela Gustafva Sparre, Swedish textile artist and member of the Royal Swedish Academy of Art (born 1772)
  - Maxim Vorobiev, Russian Romantic landscape painter (born 1787)
