= Lackawanna =

Lackawanna (/ˌlækəˈwɒnə/; from a Lenape word, either lèkaohane, meaning "sandy stream", or lechauhanne, [lɛxaohánɛk], meaning "forks of the river". is the name of various places and later businesses in the mid-Atlantic United States, generally tracing their name in some manner from the Lackawanna River in Pennsylvania.

== Places ==
=== Inhabited places ===
- Lackawanna, New York, a city in Erie County, New York, just south of Buffalo
- Lackawanna County, Pennsylvania, a county in northeast Pennsylvania, of which the county seat is Scranton

=== Natural formations ===
- Lackawanna River, a tributary of the Susquehanna River in northeastern Pennsylvania
- Lake Lackawanna, Sussex County, NJ, a man-made lake (circa 1911) and golf course

=== Other places ===
- Lackawanna Coal Mine, a former mine redeveloped as a museum in Scranton, Pennsylvania
- Lackawanna College, a college in Scranton, Pennsylvania
- Lackawanna State Park, in northeastern Pennsylvania
- Lackawanna State Forest, former name of Pinchot State Forest

== Railroads ==
- Delaware-Lackawanna Railroad, an extant shortline railroad operating in Northeastern Pennsylvania
- Erie Lackawanna Railroad (1960–1968)
- Delaware, Lackawanna and Western Railroad (1853–1960), also known as the Lackawanna Railroad
- Lackawanna and Bloomsburg Railroad (1852–1873), 19th century railroad that ran between Scranton and Northumberland
- Lackawanna and Western Railroad (1853–1960)
- Lackawanna and Wyoming Valley Railroad (1903–1976), third rail electric interurban streetcar line from 1903 to 1976

== Arts ==
- The Lackawanna Valley, a circa 1855 painting by George Inness
- Lackawanna Blues, a 2001 Ruben Santiago-Hudson play that was adapted as a 2005 television movie

== Other uses ==
- USS Lackawanna, two ships in the U.S. navy
- Lackawanna (Front Royal, Virginia), a historic home in Front Royal, Warren County, Virginia
- Lackawanna Steel Company, a former steel company that started in Scranton then moved to western New York

== See also ==
- Buffalo Six or the Lackawanna Six, American citizens accused of aiding terrorism
- Lackawanna Cut-Off
- Lackawanna Cut-Off Restoration Project
- Lackawanna Old Road
- Lackawanna Terminal (disambiguation)
