= William Evans Burton =

English actor, playwright, theatre manager and publisher

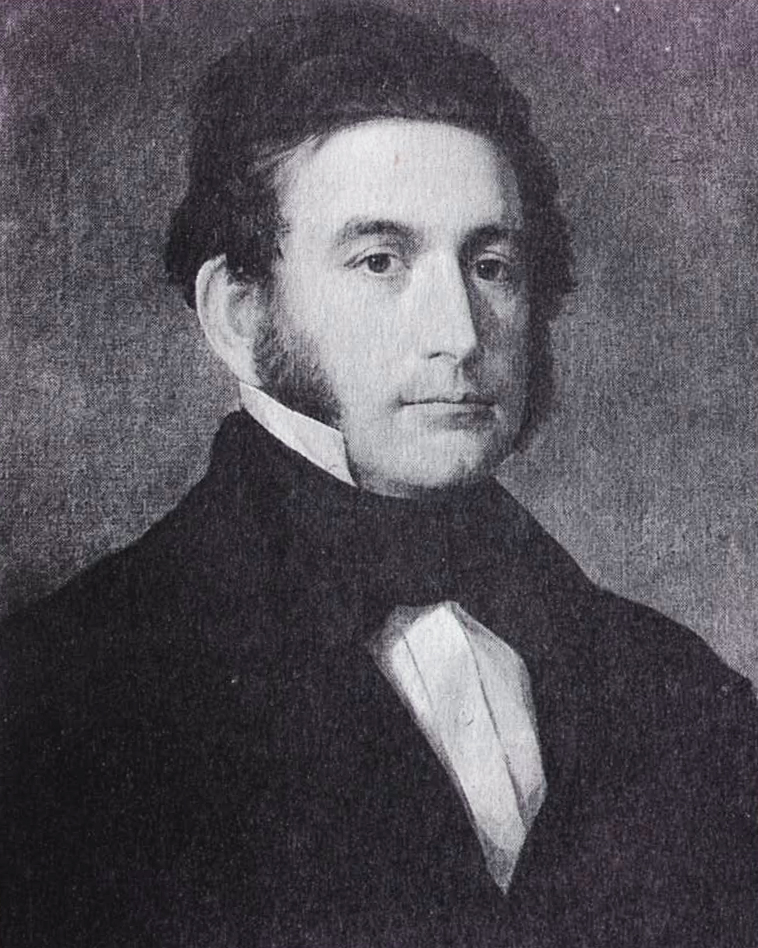
- 1858 illustration
- Born: 24 September 1804; London, United Kingdom
- Died: 10 February 1860 (aged 55); New York City, United States

William Evans Burton (24 September 1804 – 10 February 1860) was an English actor, playwright, theatre manager and publisher who relocated to the United States.

== Life and work ==
=== Early life ===
Born in London on 24 September 1804 (although some sources say 1802), Burton was the son of William George Burton (1774–1825), a printer and the author of Research into the religions of the Eastern nations as illustrative of the scriptures in 1805. Intended for a career in the church, Burton was a pupil at St. Paul's School in London, an institution associated also with the dramatic names of Robert William Elliston and Charles Mathews. At the age of 18, in consequence of the death of his father, the youth was called to take charge of the printing office, and also to be the support of a widowed mother. His first effort was to establish a monthly magazine. The attempt was a failure, but it brought him theatrical acquaintances, and under their influence he presently drifted toward the stage.

The first step in his theatrical career, as usual, was to join an amateur dramatic society, and it is said that about this time he gave a performance of Hamlet somewhere on the Strand. In 1825 he was associated with a provincial company acting at Norwich, and elsewhere in England, and he played low comedy. His aspirations at the start were for the tragic, and it is known that late in life he still at times entertained the fancy that nature had intended him to be a tragedian. Burton was one of the funniest creatures that ever lived, but his interior nature was thoughtful and saturnine. He thought, felt, and understood tragedy, but when he came to act, he was all comedian.

At the outset of his career he led the usual life of an itinerant actor. There is a tradition that in the course of his wanderings he once played before George IV at Windsor. After several years in the provinces, he made his first London appearance in 1831 at the Pavilion Theatre as Wormwood in Samuel Beazley's The Lottery Ticket, in which part he was much admired, and which he then acted there upward of fifty consecutive times. John Liston was then the reigning favourite in London (Joseph Shepherd Munden, who died in 1832, being in decadence), and next to Liston stood John Reeve, upon whom it is thought that the earlier style of Burton was in a measure founded.

In 1832 Burton obtained a chance to show his talents at the Haymarket Theatre—Liston having temporarily withdrawn—and there he played Marall to Edmund Kean as Sir Giles Overreach, and Mrs. Glover as Meg in A New Way to Pay Old Debts, a circumstance which he always remembered, and often mentioned with pride and pleasure. His talents as a writer likewise displayed themselves at an early age. In May 1833, a play from his pen, called Ellen Wareham, was first presented, and it is mentioned that this piece had the somewhat unusual fortune of being acted at five different theatres of London on the same evening. Burton went on to a large number of plays during his career.

=== Relocation to the United States ===
On 10 April 1823 Burton had married Elizabeth Loft, by whom in 1824 he had a son. The marriage was not a success, and partly due to this in 1834 Burton relocated to the United States, where he appeared in Philadelphia as Dr. Ollapod in The Poor Gentleman. He took a prominent place, both as actor and manager, in New York City, Philadelphia and Baltimore, the theatre which he leased in New York being renamed Burton's Theatre. He was very successful as Captain Cuttle in John Brougham's dramatisation of Dombey and Son, and in other low comedy parts in plays from Charles Dickens's novels.

Burton toured to Toronto, Canada, not long before his death for a two-week "star" engagement in December 1859. Burton performed in several comedies at the Royal Lyceum, including The Fillibuster, Toodles, Paul Pry, Wandering Minstrel, The Serious Family, Blue Devils, Poor Pillicoddy, John Jones and a farewell performance of Dombey and Son.

=== Publishing work ===
Burton's Gentleman's Magazine, September, 1839, contained "The Fall of the House of Usher" by Edgar Allan Poe.

In 1837 in Philadelphia he established the Gentlemen's Magazine, of which Edgar Allan Poe was for some time the editor. His magazine was intended for a general audience, incorporating the standard fare of poetry and fiction, but had a focus on sporting life like hunting and sailing. For the September 1837 issue Burton wrote an early example of the detective story, 'The Secret Cell', detailing a London policeman's efforts to trace an abducted girl and arrest her kidnappers. Burton likely served as a literary critic himself for the magazine. To remain competitive, the magazine included better paper, more illustrations, and higher-quality printing, making production costs high. Poe became an editor in 1839, though Burton disliked Poe's harsh style of criticism. Even so, Poe's responsibilities increased whenever Burton left town to perform at other venues. It was under Burton that Poe began what has since been termed the "Longfellow War", with Poe using his role as critic to anonymously accuse the popular poet Henry Wadsworth Longfellow of plagiarism. Another critic, Willis Gaylord Clark, blamed Burton for allowing these literary attacks, telling Longfellow that Burton was: "a vagrant from England, who has left a wife and offspring behind him there, and plays the bigamist in this with another wife, and his whore besides; one who cannot write a paragraph in English to save his life".

Poe was fired by Burton in June 1840. Burton and Poe had a tumultuous working relationship. Burton tried selling the magazine without telling Poe, and Poe made plans to launch his own competing Philadelphia-based magazine called The Penn without mentioning it to Burton. Additionally, Burton may have written a particularly scathing negative review of Poe's novel The Narrative of Arthur Gordon Pym of Nantucket and spread rumours of his drunkenness, which Poe denied. Poe told a friend that Burton was a "blackguard and a villain." Poe's friend Joseph E. Snodgrass thought Burton's rumour-mongering was enough for Poe to sue for slander but Poe noted his own name-calling was enough for a countersuit.

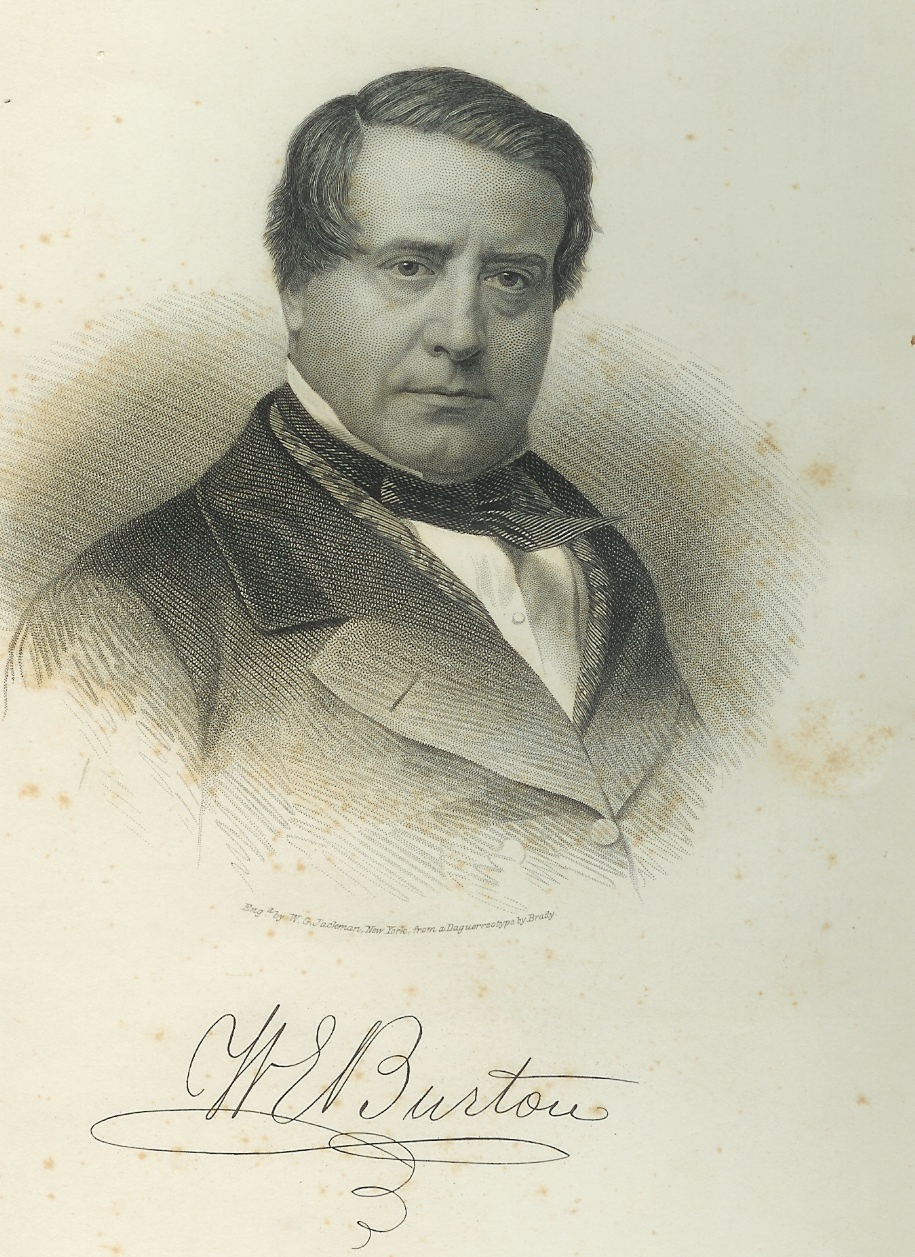
William Evans Burton

=== Later life ===
In late 1840, Burton sold his magazine to George Rex Graham for the price of $3,500 (one dollar for each subscriber), who transformed it into Graham's Magazine. Burton used the money from the sale to renovate his theatre, which eventually failed. Burton went on to become the editor of the Cambridge Quarterly and the Souvenir. He also wrote several books, including a Cyclopaedia of Wit and Humour in 1857.

Burton died on 10 February 1860 in New York City. At the time of his death, he had collected a library of over 100,000 volumes, especially rich in books by and relating to William Shakespeare. He left his fortune to charity but his wife Elizabeth, from whom he had separated 26 years earlier, arrived from England to claim dower. Judgment initially went against her but after a series of appeals the Supreme Court upheld her claim, thus establishing the rights of an alien to dower in the United States.

William Evans Burton was the father of the English painter William Shakespeare Burton.
