= Normandy Thatched Cottage, Old Trouville =

Painting by Paul Huet

Chaumière Normande, Vieux Trouville
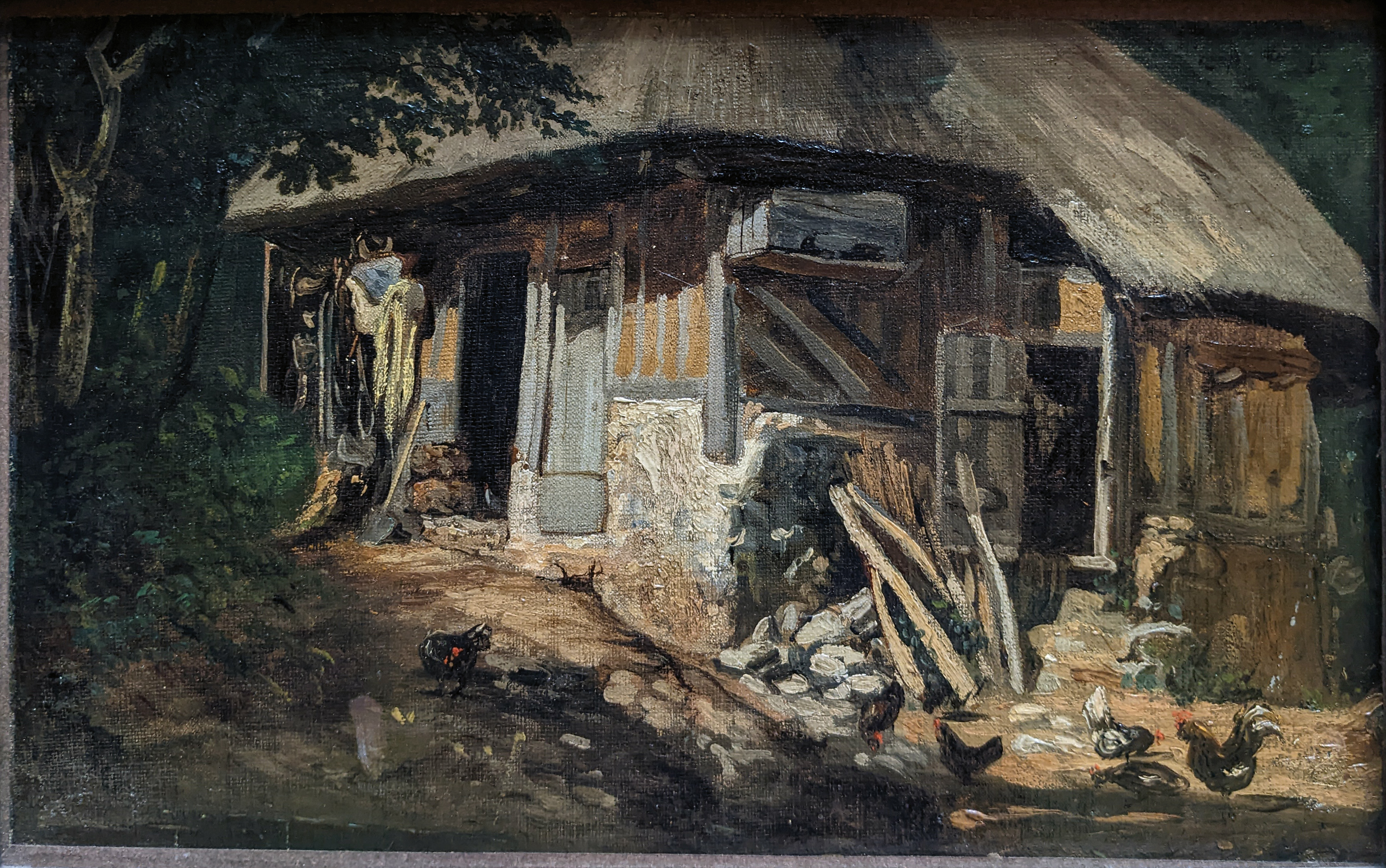
- Artist: Paul Huet
- Year: 1861
- Medium: oil on canvas
- Dimensions: 23 cm × 38 cm (9.1 in × 15 in)
- Location: Musée du Louvre, Paris

Normandy Thatched Cottage, Old Trouville (French: Chaumière normande, vieux Trouville) is an oil painting by French artist Paul Huet. It is currently on display at the Musée du Louvre in Paris.
