= Riverside (Front Royal, Virginia) =

Historic house in Virginia, United States

- U.S. National Register of Historic Places
- U.S. Historic district – Contributing property
- Virginia Landmarks Register
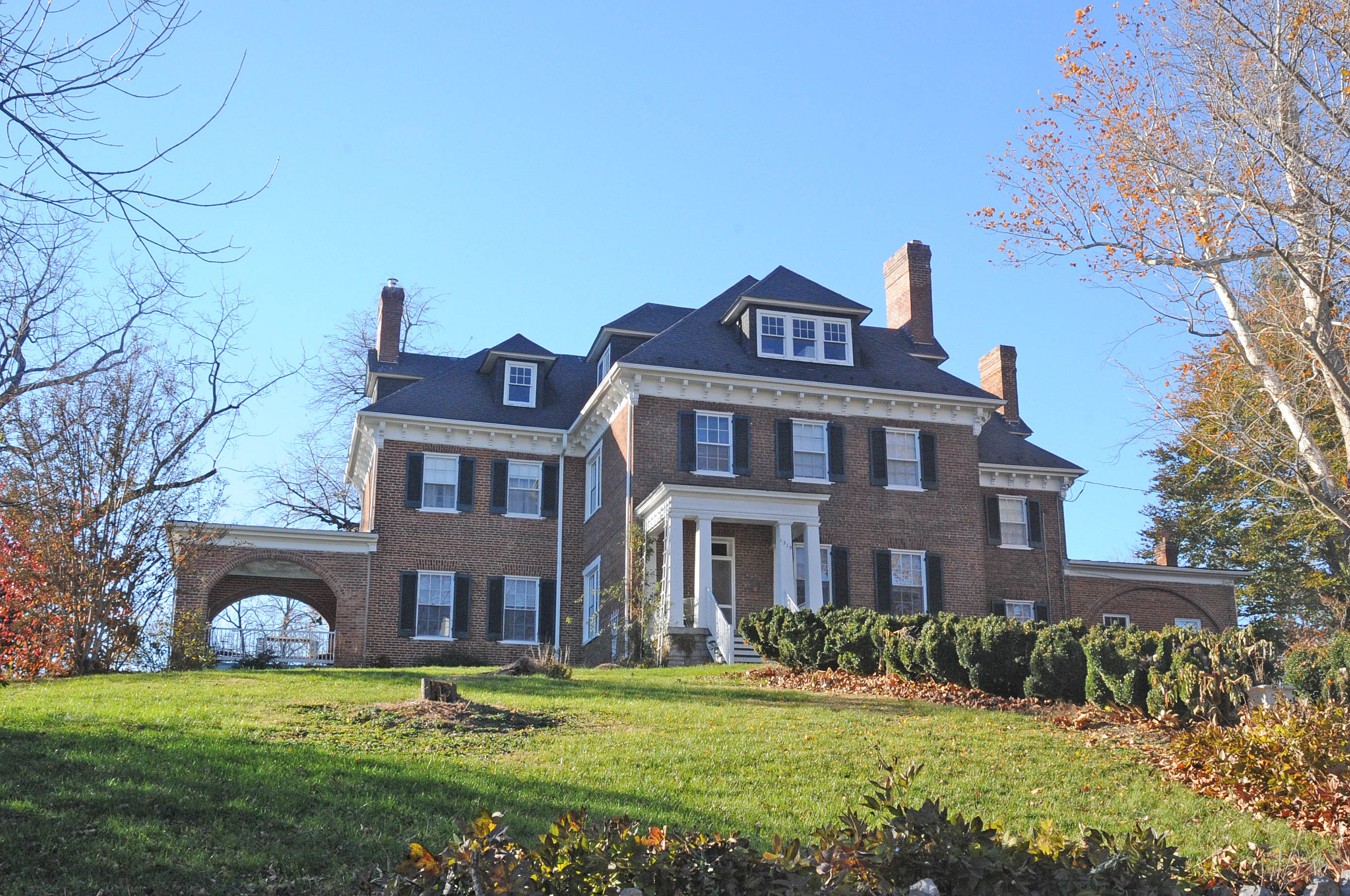
- Riverside in November, 2016

- Location within Shenandoah Valley Location within Northern Virginia Location within Virginia Location within the United States
- Location: 1315 Old Winchester Pike, Front Royal, Virginia
- Coordinates: 38°56′43″N 78°11′48″W
- Area: 2.5 acres (1.0 ha)
- Built: c. 1850
- Architectural style: Colonial Revival, Italianate, Greek Revival
- Part of: Riverton Historic District (ID2000514)
- NRHP reference No.: 95001172
- VLR No.: 112-5350

Significant dates
- Added to NRHP: October 12, 1995
- Designated CP: May 16, 2002
- Designated VLR: August 28, 1995

Riverside is a historic home located at Front Royal, Warren County, Virginia. It was built about 1850, and is a large 2 1/2-story, seven-bay, T-shaped brick dwelling with Greek Revival, Italianate, and Colonial Revival design elements. It has a side-passage, double-pile plan with matching single-pile wings, with additions added in 1921, to the north and south. The front facade features a one-bay, hip-roofed, Greek Revival-style portico. The house has a hipped roof with dormers added in the early-20th century. Also on the property is the contributing early-20th century garage.

It was listed on the National Register of Historic Places in 1995. It is located in the Riverton Historic District.
