= Riverton Historic District (Front Royal, Virginia) =

Historic district in Virginia, United States

- U.S. National Register of Historic Places
- U.S. Historic district
- Virginia Landmarks Register
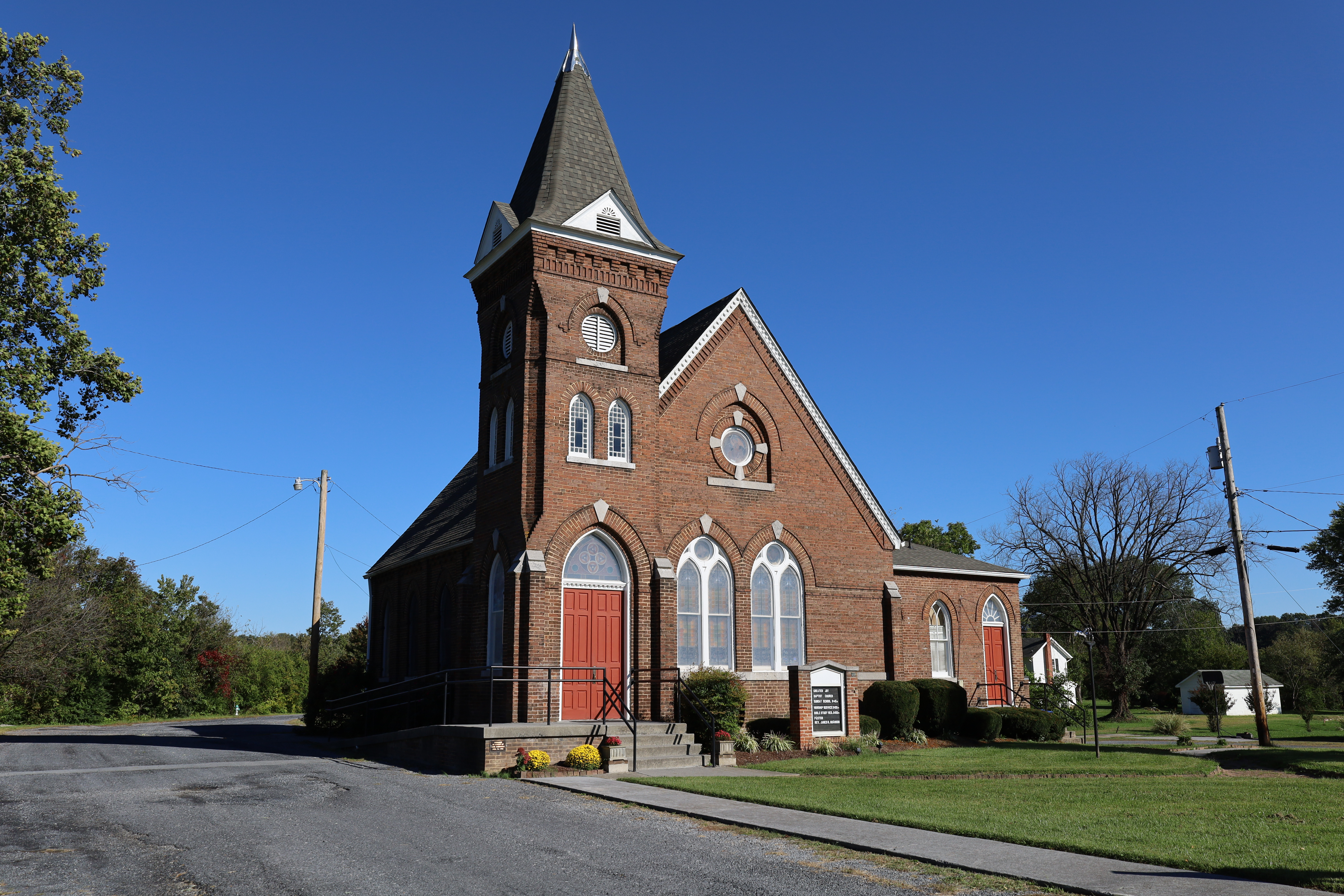
- The old Riverton United Methodist Church building in 2020

- Location within Shenandoah Valley Location within Northern Virginia Location within Virginia Location within the United States
- Location: Roughly along Crisman Dr., Duck St., Old Winchester Pike, Queens Hwy., Riverside Dr., Rugby St., and Strasburg Rd., Front Royal, Virginia
- Coordinates: 38°56′48″N 78°11′53″W
- Area: 66 acres (27 ha)
- Built: 1849
- Architectural style: Mid 19th Century Revival, Late Victorian
- NRHP reference No.: 02000514
- VLR No.: 112-5328

Significant dates
- Added to NRHP: May 16, 2002
- Designated VLR: December 6, 2000

Riverton Historic District is a national historic district located at Front Royal, Warren County, Virginia, United States. The district encompasses 66 contributing buildings and one contributing site in the town of Front Royal. It is a primarily residential district with buildings dating from the mid-19th century and including a diverse collection of building types and architectural styles. Notable buildings include Lackawanna (1869), the Old Duncan Hotel (c. 1880), the Riverton United Methodist Church (1883-1890), Dellbrook (c. 1884), the Carson Lime Company worker's houses, and the Old Riverton Post Office and Grocery. Located in the district and separately listed is Riverside.

It was listed on the National Register of Historic Places in 2000.

== Gallery ==
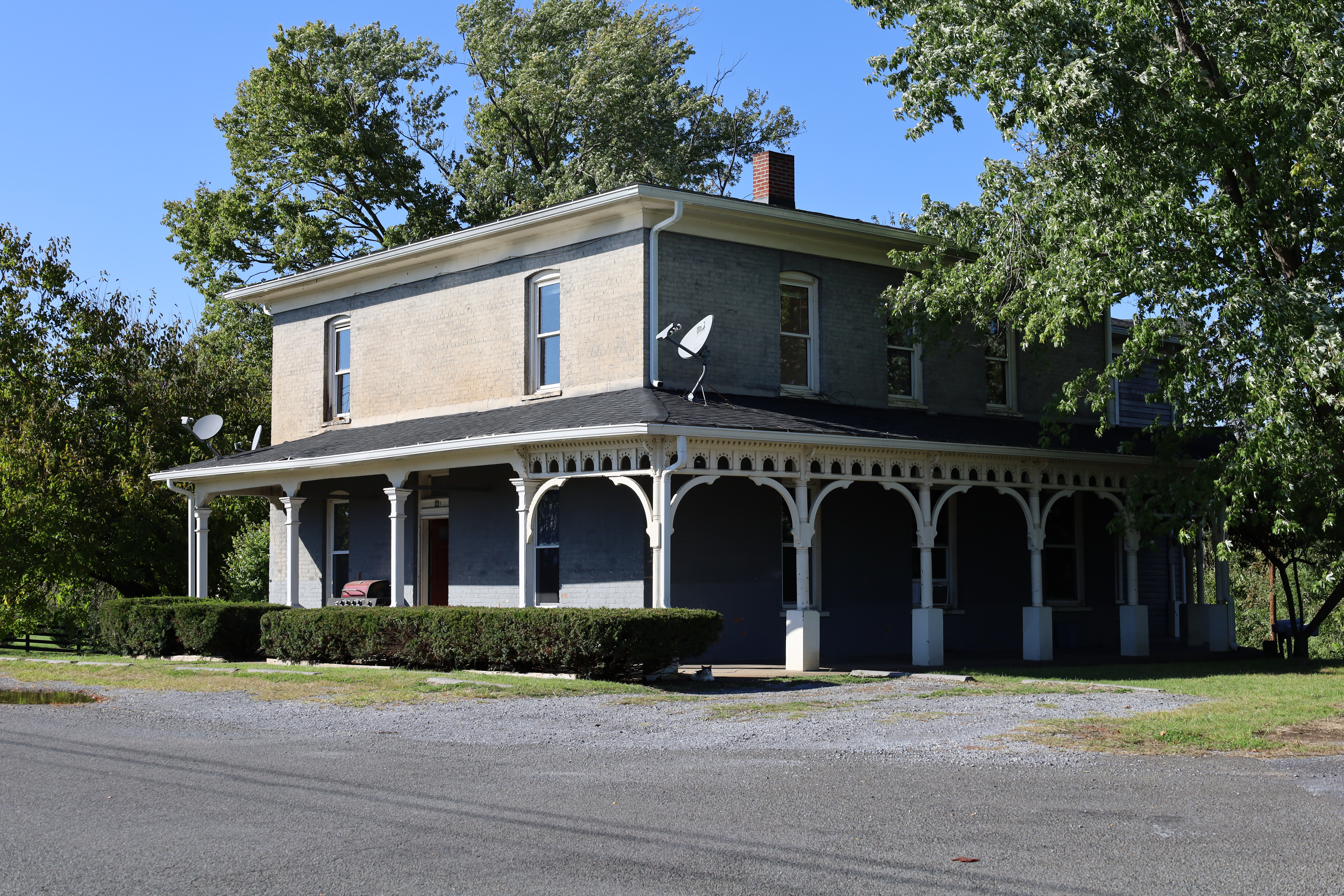
Old Duncan Hotel

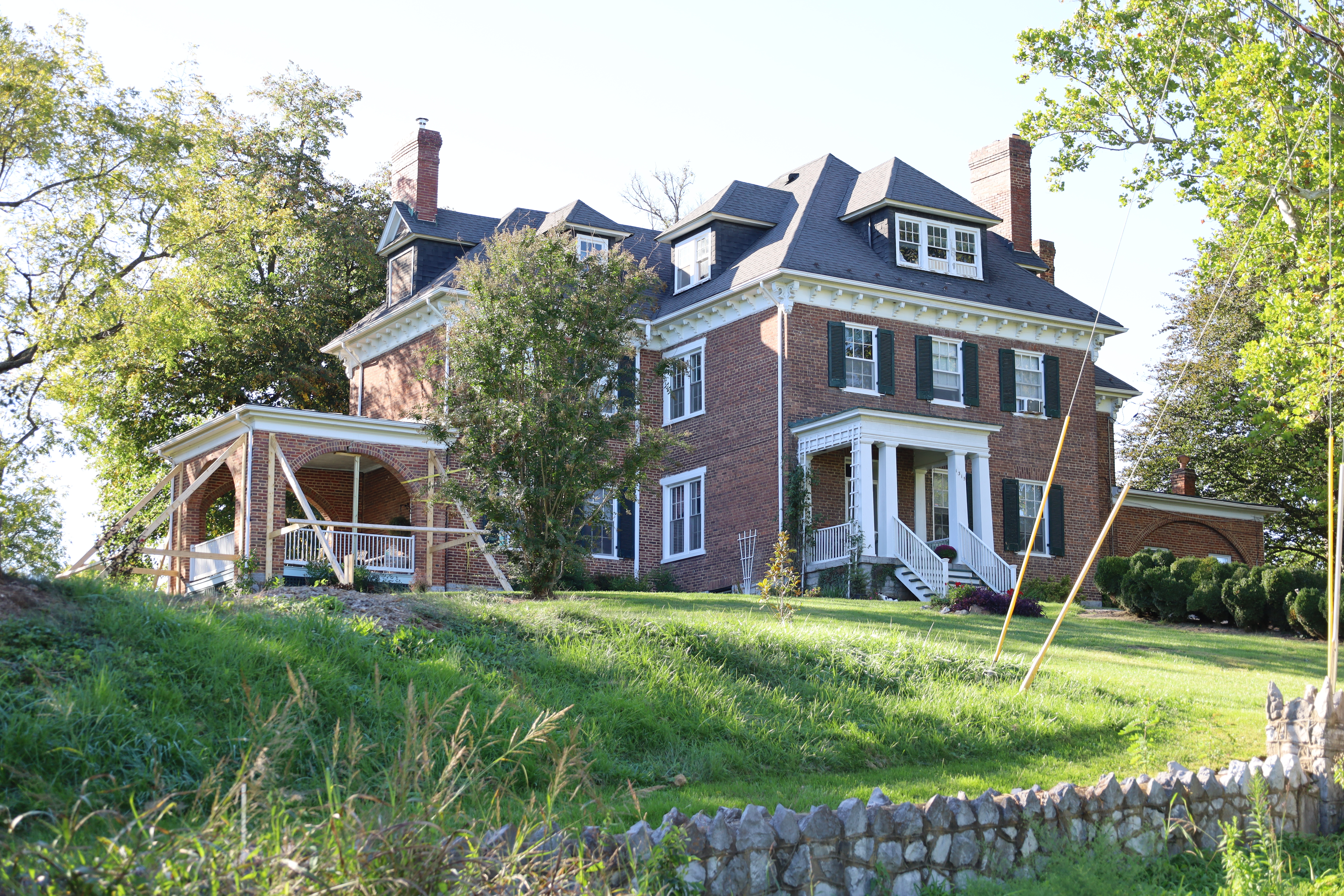
Riverside

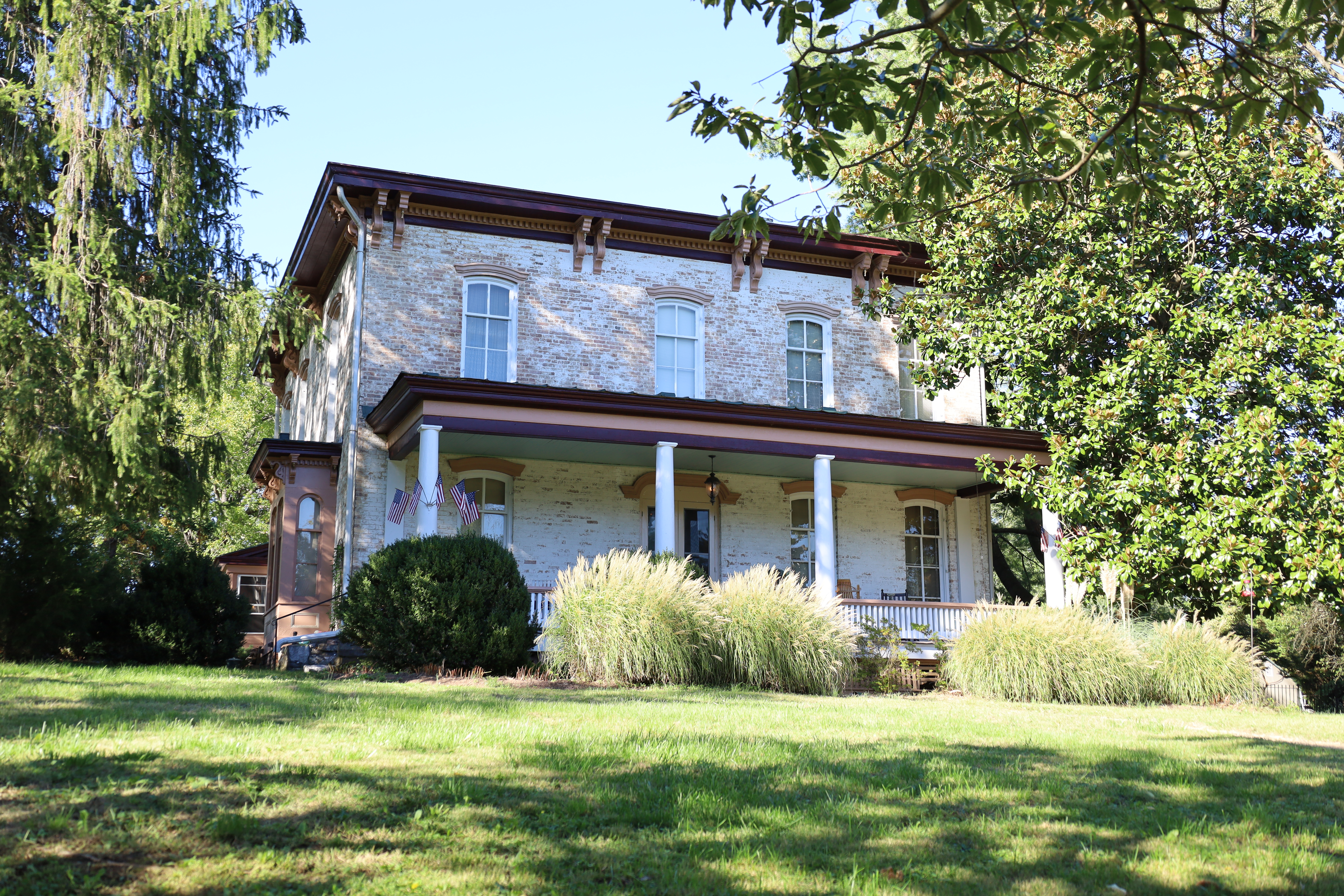
Lackawanna

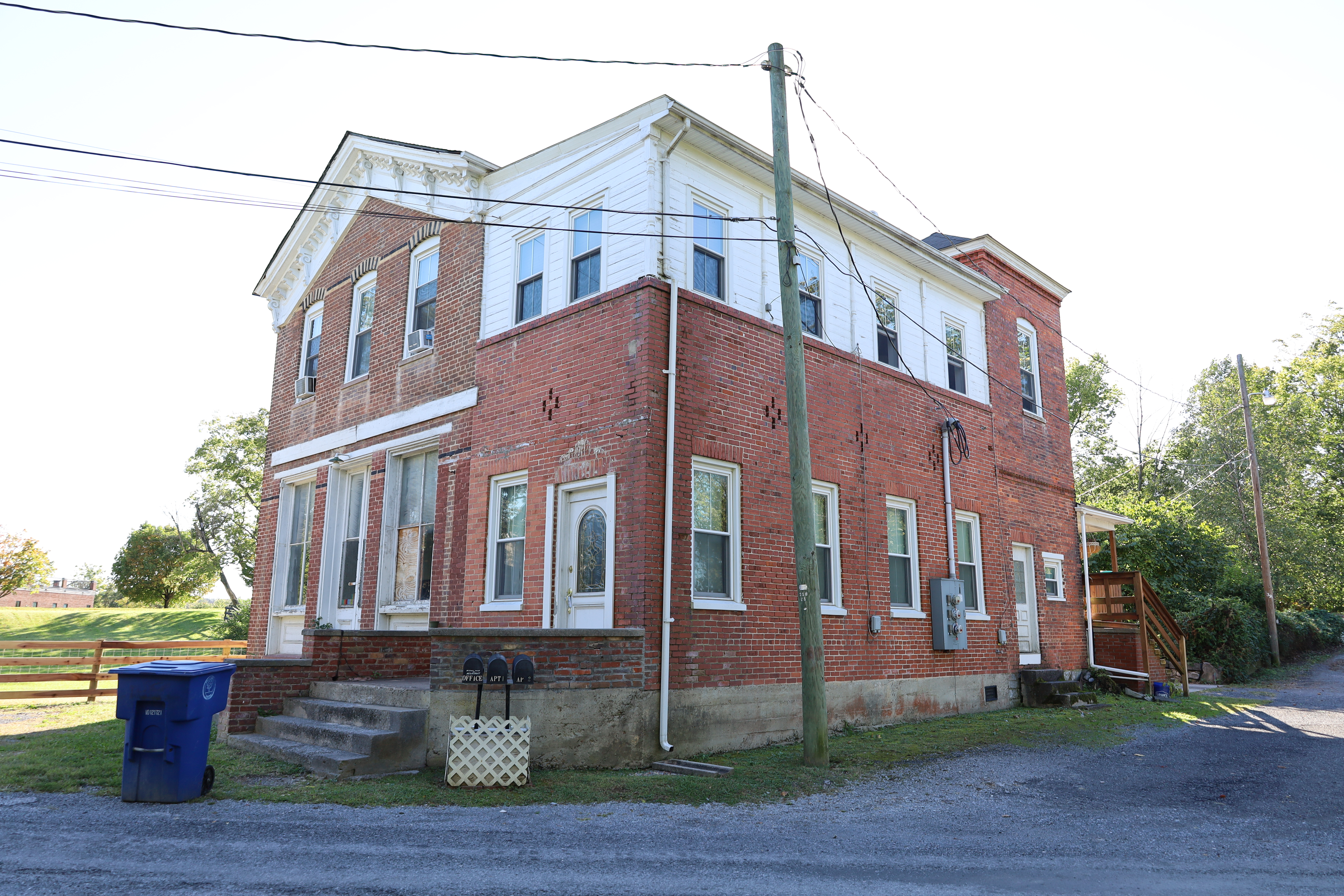
Old Riverton Post Office and Grocery

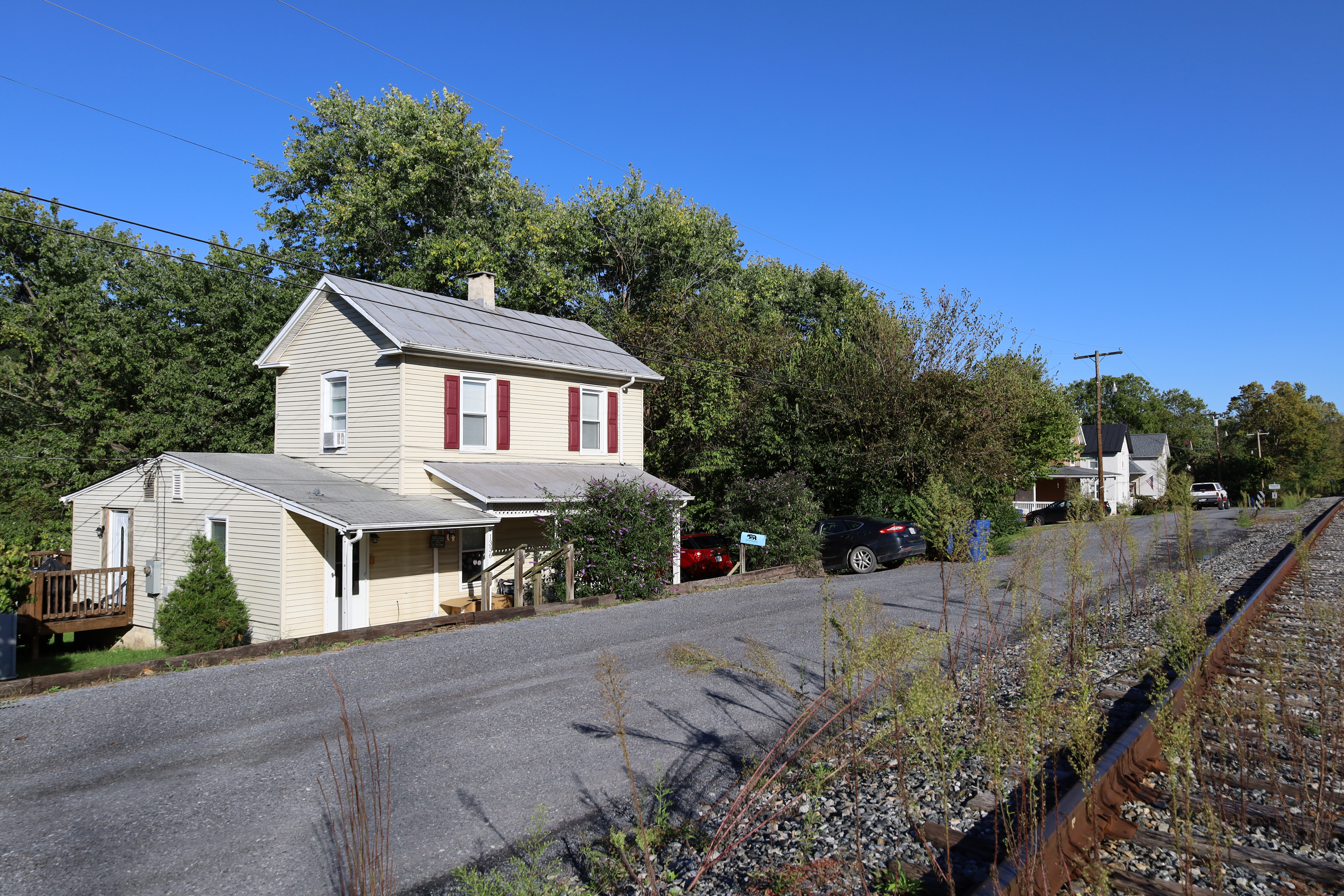
Houses along Queens Highway

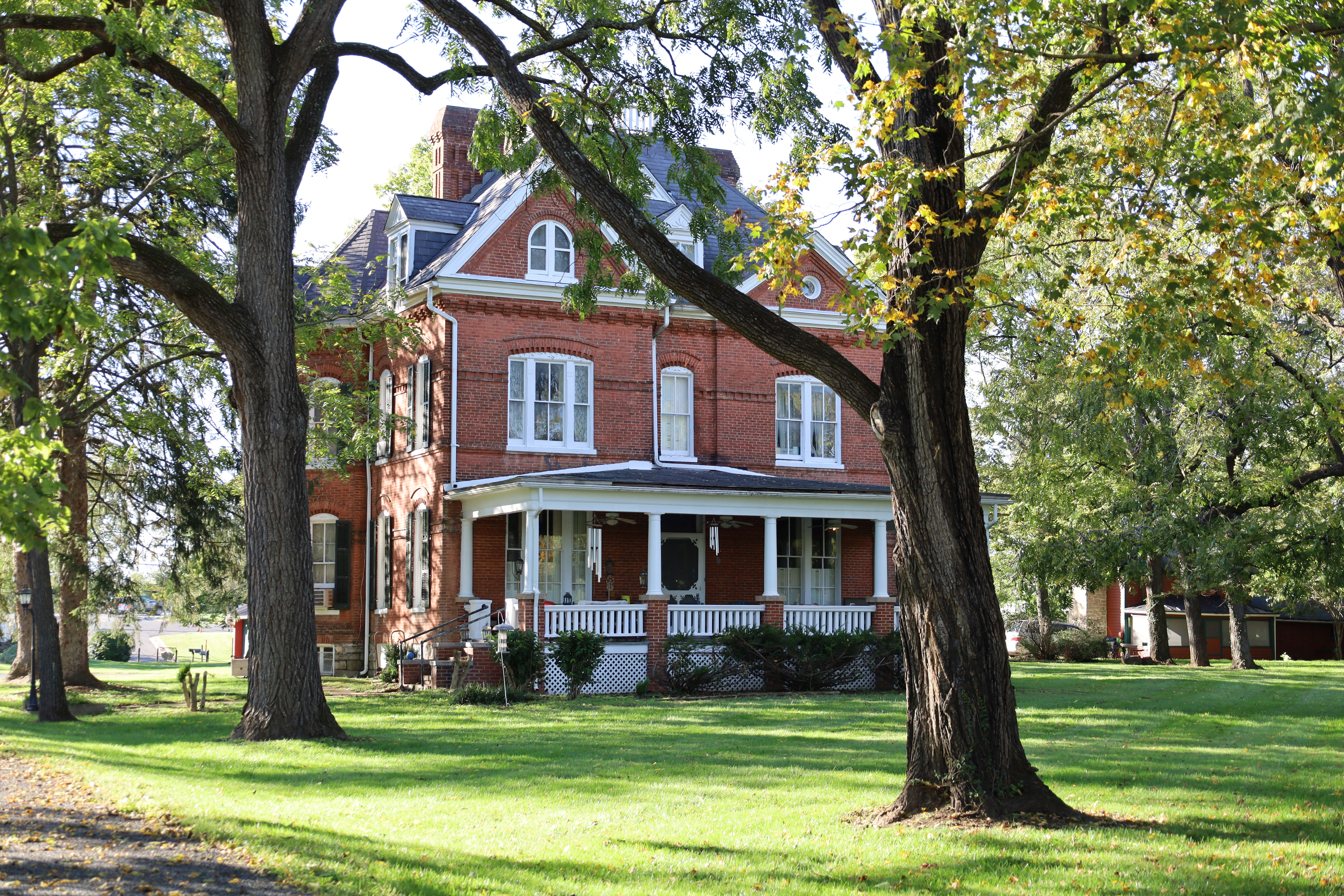
Dellbrook

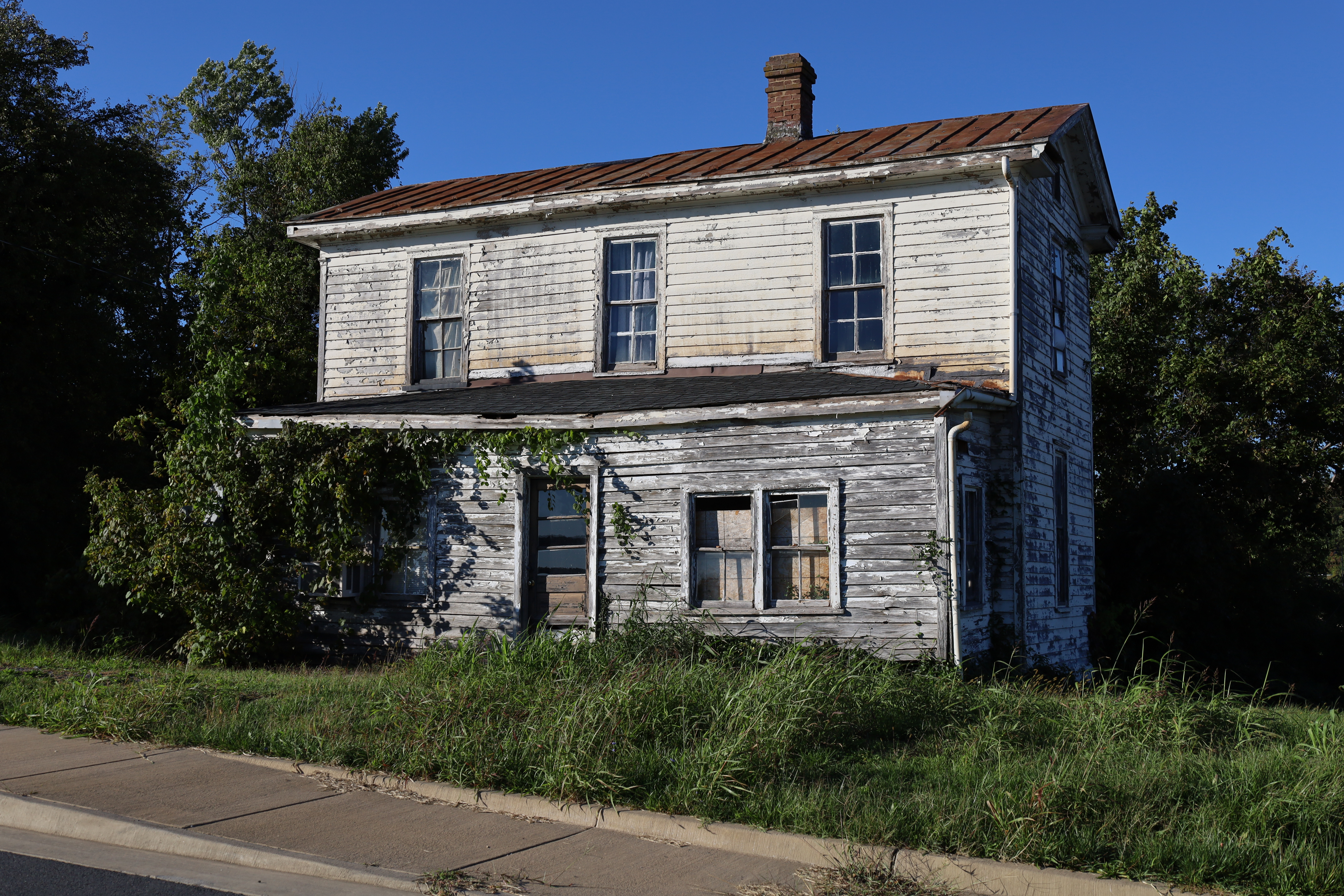
Abandoned house
