= Lackawanna Terminal =

Lackawanna Terminal could refer to several former Delaware, Lackawanna and Western Railroad stations:

- Hoboken Terminal in Hoboken, New Jersey
- Lackawanna Terminal (Montclair, New Jersey) in Montclair, New Jersey
- Radisson Lackawanna Station Hotel in Scranton, Pennsylvania
- Lackawanna Terminal (Buffalo, New York) in Buffalo, New York
