= Paul Huet =

French painter

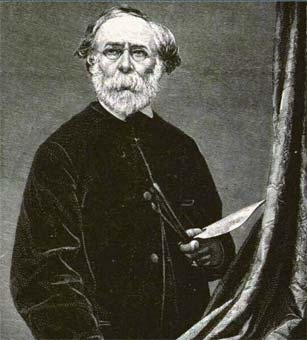
Paul Huet

Paul Huet (French pronunciation: [pɔl ɥɛ]; 3 October 1803 – 8 January 1869) was a French painter and printmaker born in Paris. He studied under Gros and Guerin. He met the English painter Richard Parkes Bonington in the studio of Gros, where he studied irregularly from 1819 to 1822. Bonington's example influenced Huet to reject neoclassicism and instead paint landscapes based on close observation of nature. The British landscape paintings exhibited in the Salon of 1824 were a revelation to Huet, who said of Constable's work: "It was the first time perhaps that one felt the freshness, that one saw a luxuriant, verdant nature, without blackness, crudity or mannerism." Huet's subsequent work combined emulation of the English style with inspiration derived from Dutch and Flemish old masters such as Rubens, Jacob van Ruisdael, and Meindert Hobbema.

He exhibited in the Salon for the first time at the Salon of 1827, when one of the eight paintings he submitted was accepted by the jury. Afterwards he showed at the Salon regularly, and won the support of many important critics. Among his champions was Eugène Delacroix, whom Huet had met In November 1822. Less enthusiastic was Étienne-Jean Delécluze, who criticized Huet as "the painter who has been the most faithful to the principles of Constable, Turner, Daniell and by extension Watteau ... he totally neglects design."

Huet participated in the July Revolution of 1830, and was involved in republican politics for a period afterwards. He was awarded a pair of Sèvres porcelain vases from King Louis-Philippe in 1844. He was awarded a gold medal at the Salon of 1848. He exhibited in the Exposition Universelle of 1855, where he was awarded a medal, and also exhibited in the International Exposition of 1867.

Huet's works, which include oil paintings, watercolors, etchings, and lithographs, are Romantic in feeling. He was unusual among French landscape painters in his use of watercolor for sketching as well as for finished works, which were often so richly developed that they resemble oil paintings. The vividness with which he depicted natural forms influenced the painters of the Barbizon School and later the Impressionists.

Huet died in Paris on 8 January 1869 and is buried at Cimetière du Montparnasse.

== Selected works ==
- The Flood of Saint-Cloud
- Normandy Thatched Cottage, Old Trouville

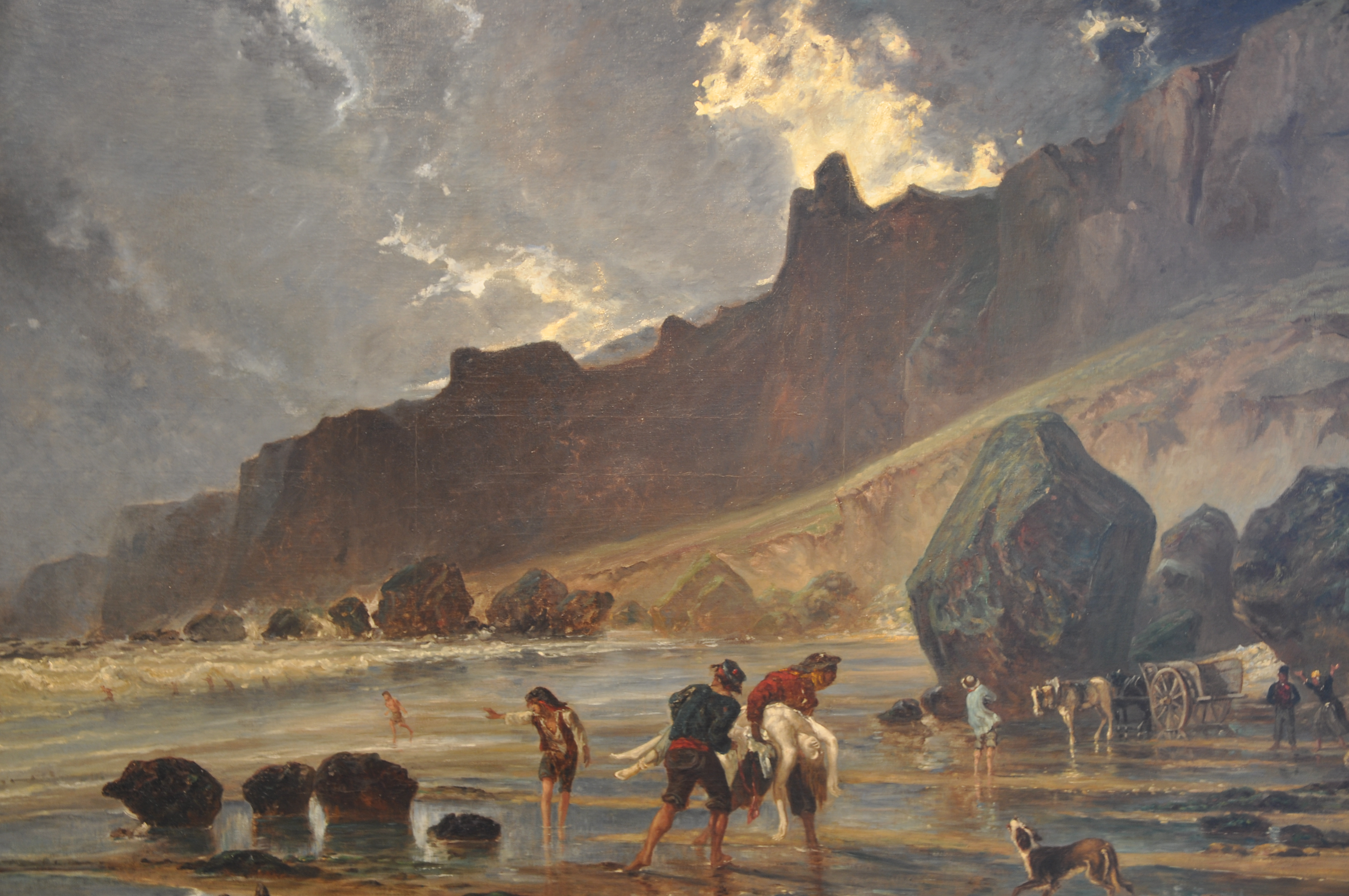
Vue des falaises de Houlgatte

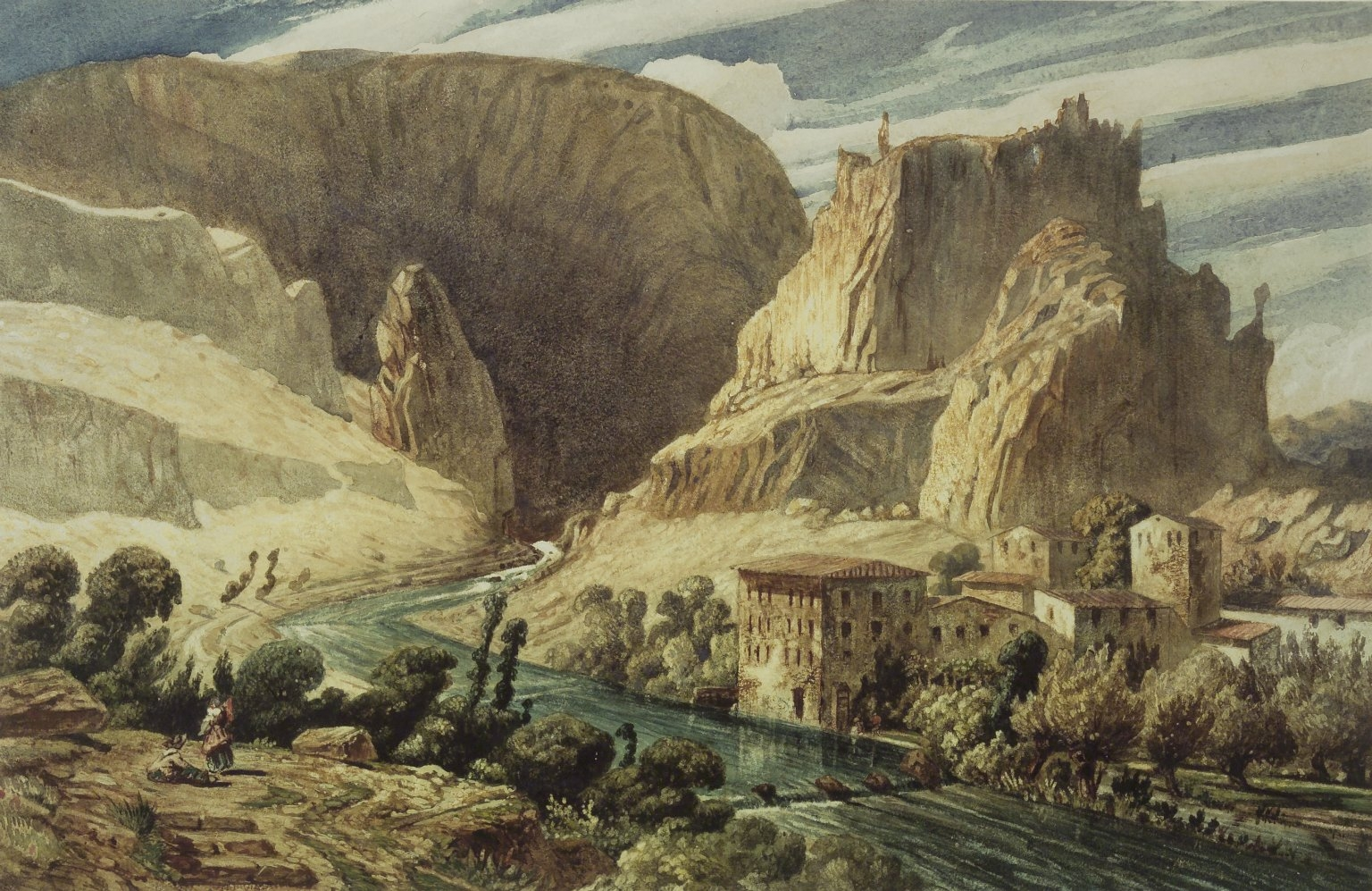
Paul Huet, Fontaine de Vaucluse, ca. 1839, watercolor, 28.9 × 44.5 cm. Brooklyn Museum
