= Lackawanna (Front Royal, Virginia) =

Historic house in Virginia, United States

- U.S. National Register of Historic Places
- U.S. Historic district – Contributing property
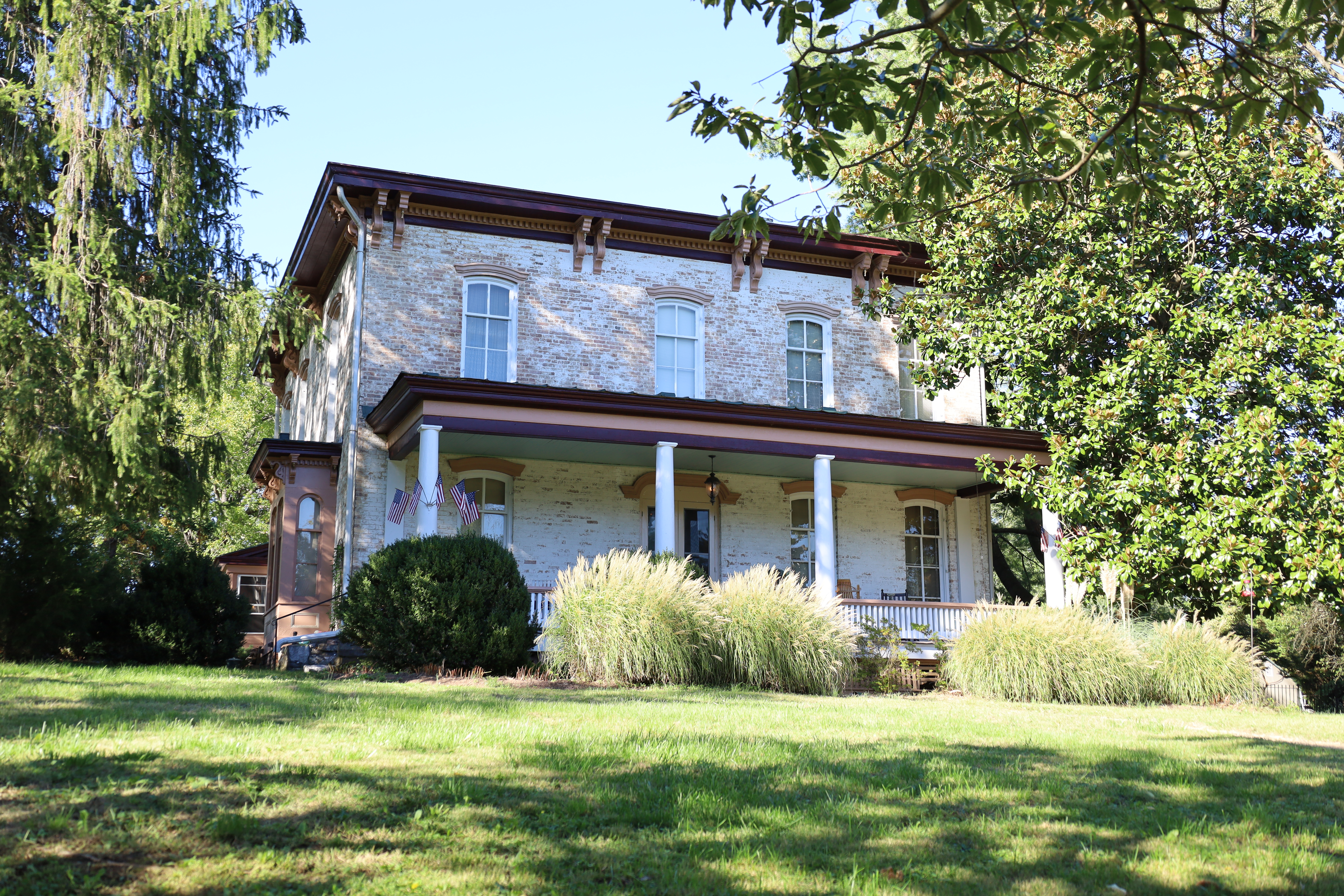
- Lackawanna in 2020

- Location within Northern Virginia Location within Virginia Location within the United States
- Location: 236 Riverside Drive, Front Royal, Virginia
- Coordinates: 38°56′44″N 78°11′39″W
- Area: 1.75 acres (0.71 ha)
- Built: 1869
- Architectural style: Italianate
- Part of: Riverton Historic District (ID2000514)
- NRHP reference No.: 14000240

Significant dates
- Added to NRHP: May 16, 2014
- Designated CP: May 16, 2002

Lackawanna is a historic home at 236 Riverside Road in Front Royal, Warren County, Virginia. The 2 1/2-story brick house was built in 1869 for Dorastus Cone, a merchant who moved to the area from the Lackawanna River valley in Pennsylvania. The house has well-preserved Italianate features, including bracketed eaves and segmented-arch windows. Distinctive features that survive include top-floor windows whose sashes rise into the attic space, and a period bathroom.

The house was listed on the National Register of Historic Places in 2014; it was designated a part of the Riverton Historic District in 2002. It is now operated as a bed and breakfast inn.

== See also ==
- National Register of Historic Places listings in Warren County, Virginia
