= Jules Monge =

French painter

- Born: 25 December 1855; Marseille, France
- Died: 1 July 1934 (aged 78); Paris, France
- Known for: Painting
- Notable work: L'Ancêtre; Clairon de turcos blessé; Usine de guerre à Saint-Roch; Adolphe Monticelli, dit autrefois portrait de Claude Monet

Jules Monge (25 December 1855 – 1 July 1934) was a French painter.

== Biography ==
He was a pupil of Alexandre Cabanel, Édouard Detaille and Gaston Casimir Saint-Pierre. He exhibited in Paris at the Salon des artistes français from 1881 to 1933 and achieved many successes. He also exhibited in provincial towns. He produced numerous portraits and military scenes. During the interwar period he visited Republican China and painted its scenes of everyday life.

== Gallery ==
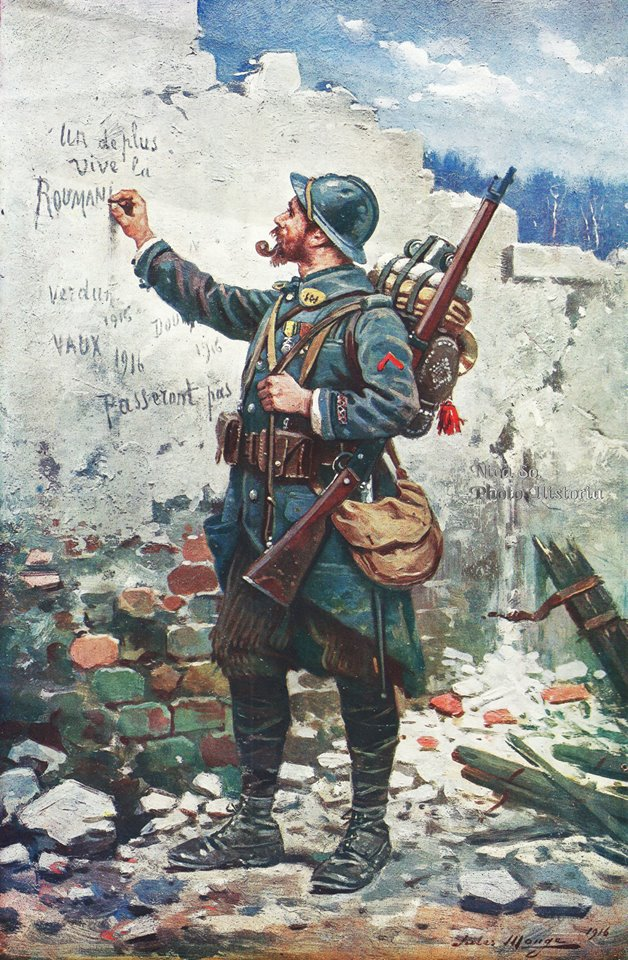
Vive la Roumanie, 1916

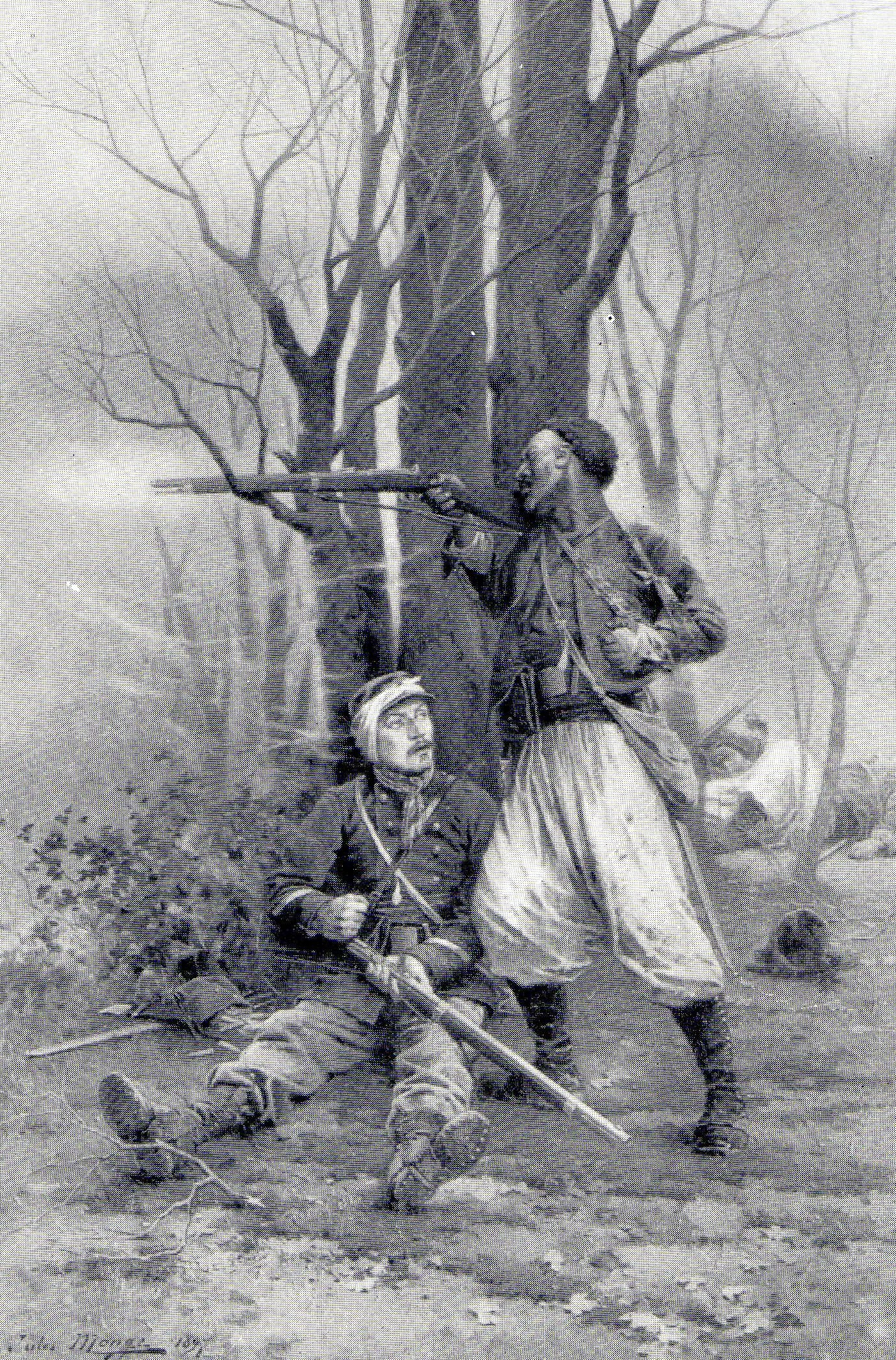
Le Turco Ben-Kadour à Lorcy, before 1911

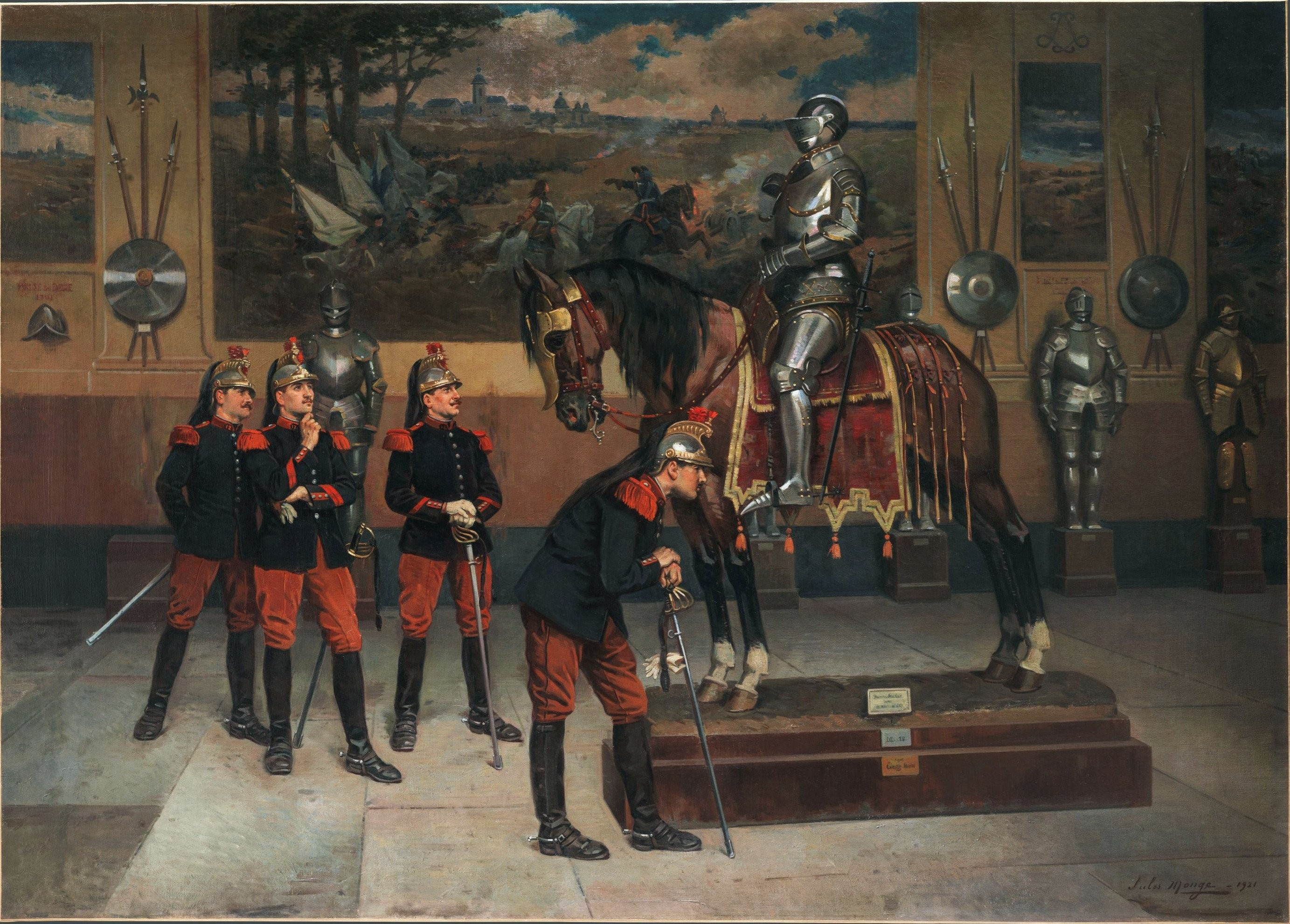
L'Ancêtre, Army Museum, 1921

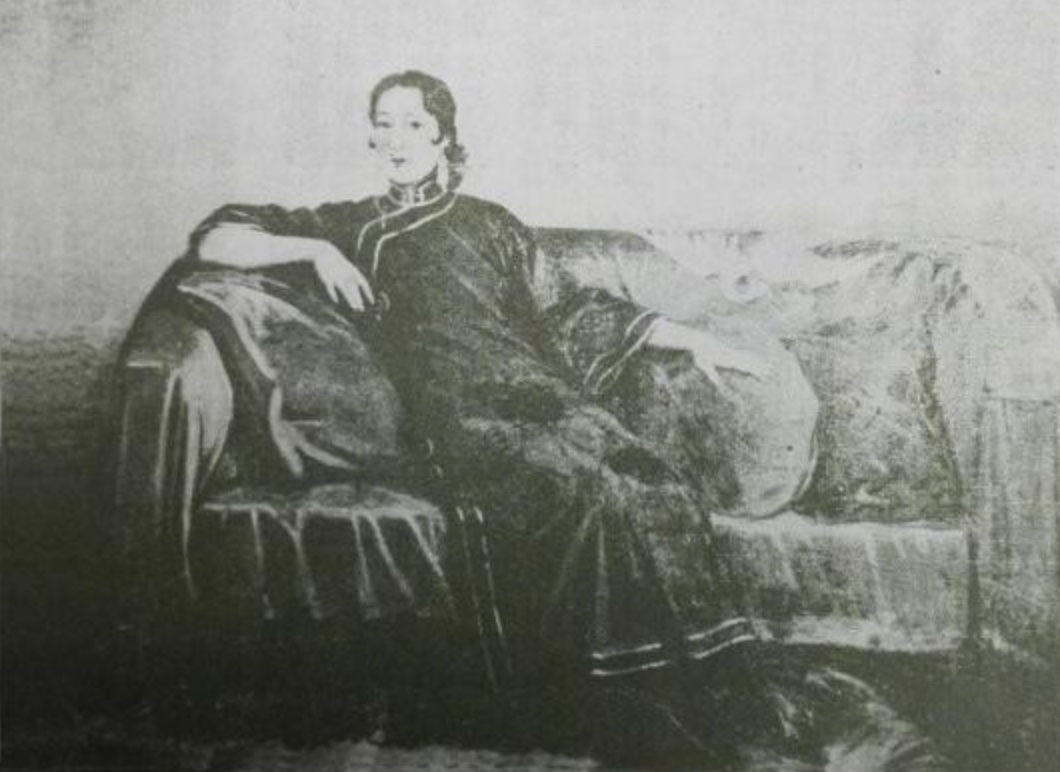
Portrait of Madame Dan Pao-Tchao, 1920s
