= The Flood of Saint-Cloud =

Painting by Paul Huet

L'inondation à Saint-Cloud
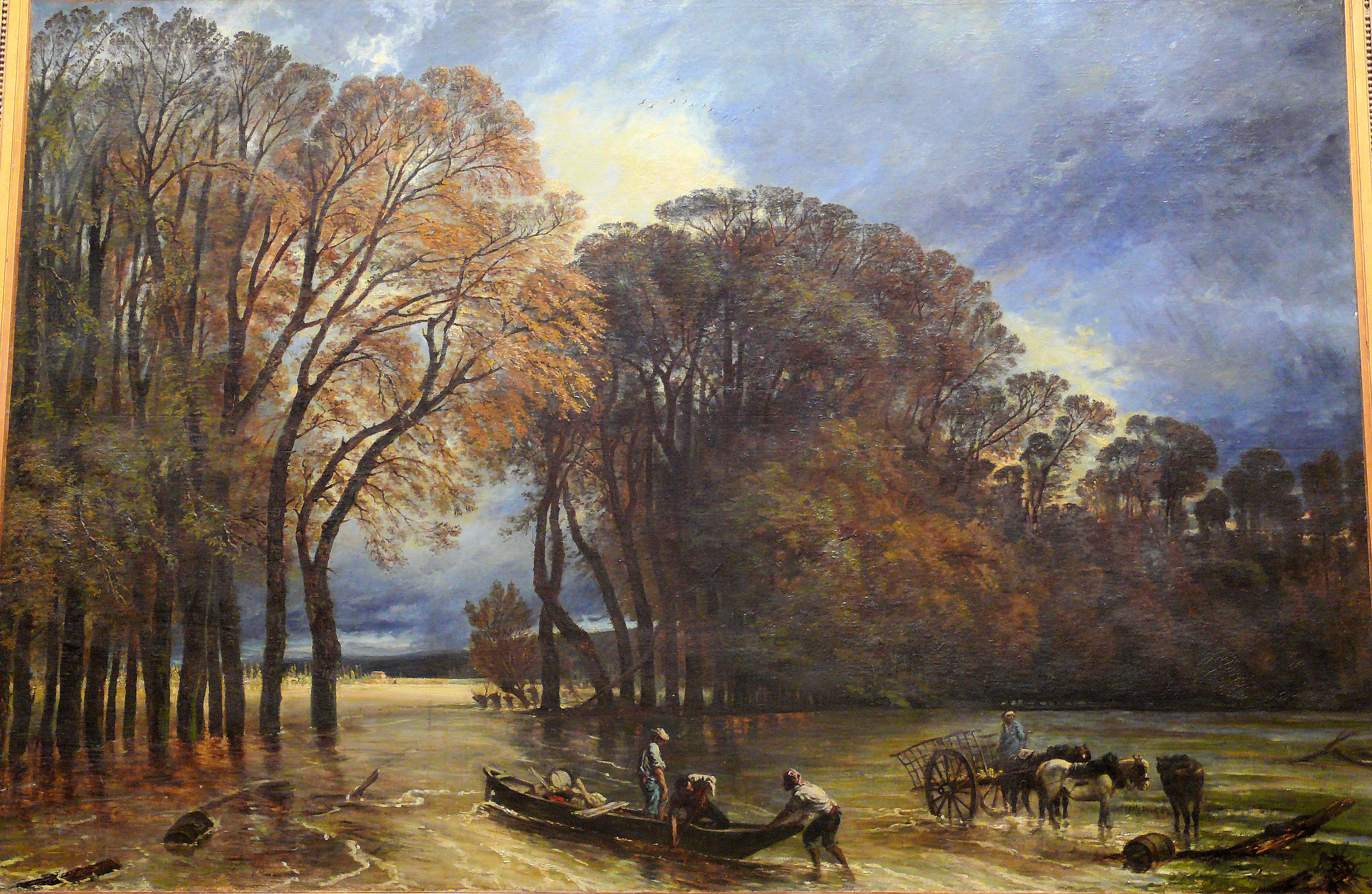
- Artist: Paul Huet
- Year: 1855
- Medium: oil on canvas
- Dimensions: 203 cm × 300 cm (80 in × 120 in)
- Location: Musée du Louvre; Paris

The Flood at Saint-Cloud (French: L'inondation à Saint-Cloud) is an oil painting by French artist Paul Huet, which was first exhibited at the Exposition Universelle of 1855 in Paris. It is now kept in the Musée du Louvre, in Paris.
