= The Wounded Cavalier =

Painting by William Shakespeare Burton

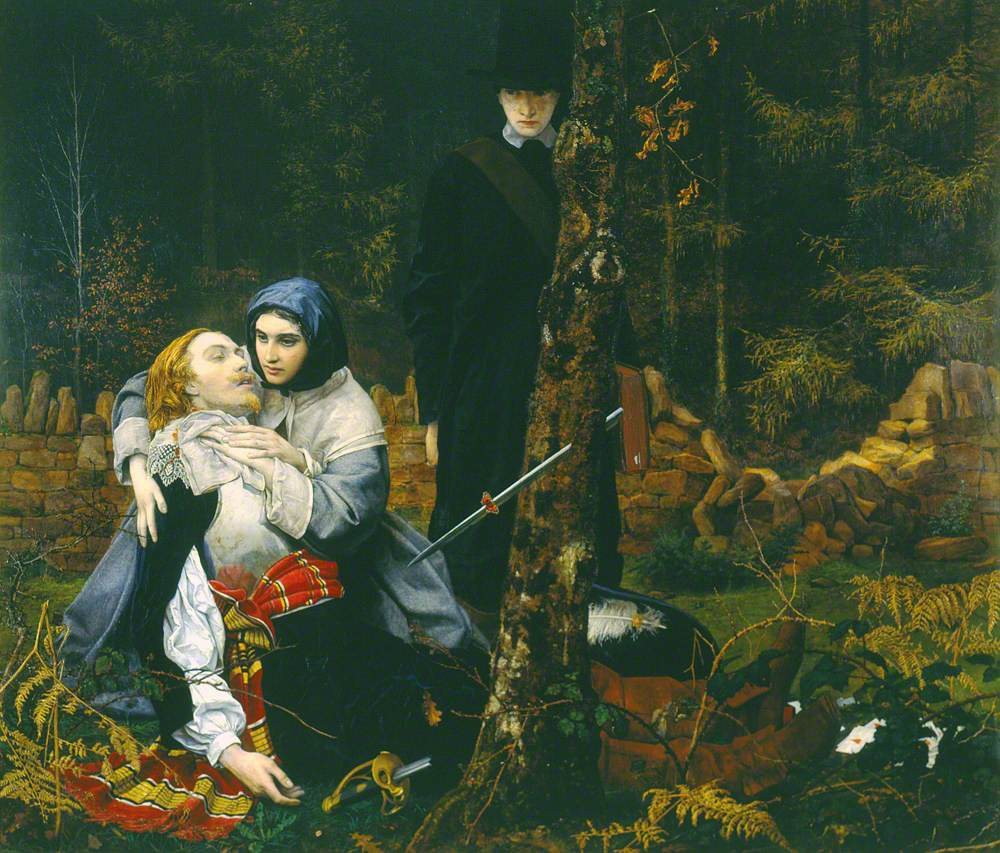
- Artist: William Shakespeare Burton
- Year: 1855
- Type: Oil on canvas, history painting
- Dimensions: 89 cm × 104 cm (35 in × 41 in)
- Location: Guildhall Art Gallery, London

The Wounded Cavalier is an 1855 history painting by the British artist William Shakespeare Burton. It depicts a scene from the English Civil War during the 1640s.

Burton was associated with the Pre-Raphaelite Brotherhood. Produced En plein air, Burton has a hole dug in the ground so he could display the ferns more accurately. The painting was displayed at the Royal Academy Exhibition of 1856 held at the National Gallery in London, where it hung next to The Scapegoat by William Holman Hunt. Today it is in the Guildhall Art Gallery which acquired it in 1911.

== Bibliography ==
- Dowling, Linda C. Charles Eliot Norton: The Art of Reform in Nineteenth-century America. University of New Hampshire, 2007.
- Gilmour, Robin. The Victorian Period: The Intellectual and Cultural Context of English Literature, 1830-1890. Taylor & Francis, 2014.
- Roe, Sonia. Oil Paintings in Public Ownership in the City of London of London. Public Catalogue Foundation, 2009.
- Suriano, Gregory R. The British Pre-Raphaelite Illustrators. Oak Knoll Press, 2005.
