= William Shakespeare Burton =

English painter

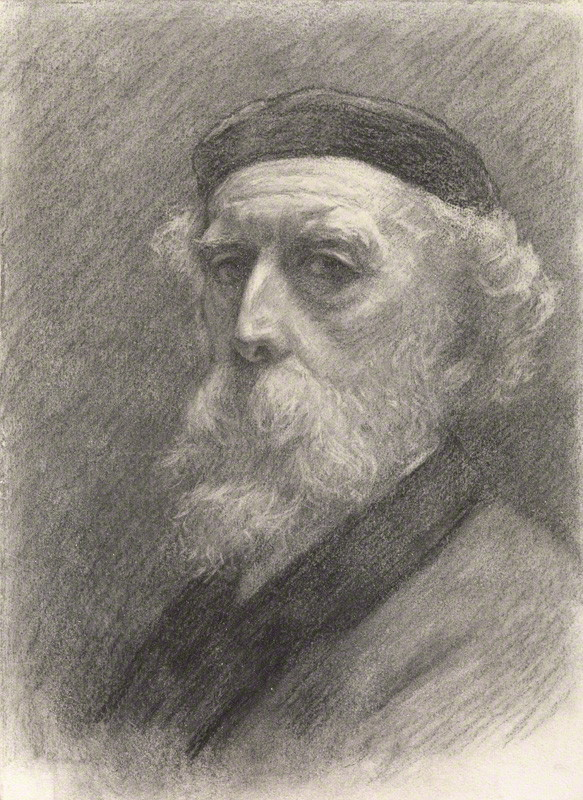
William Shakespeare Burton

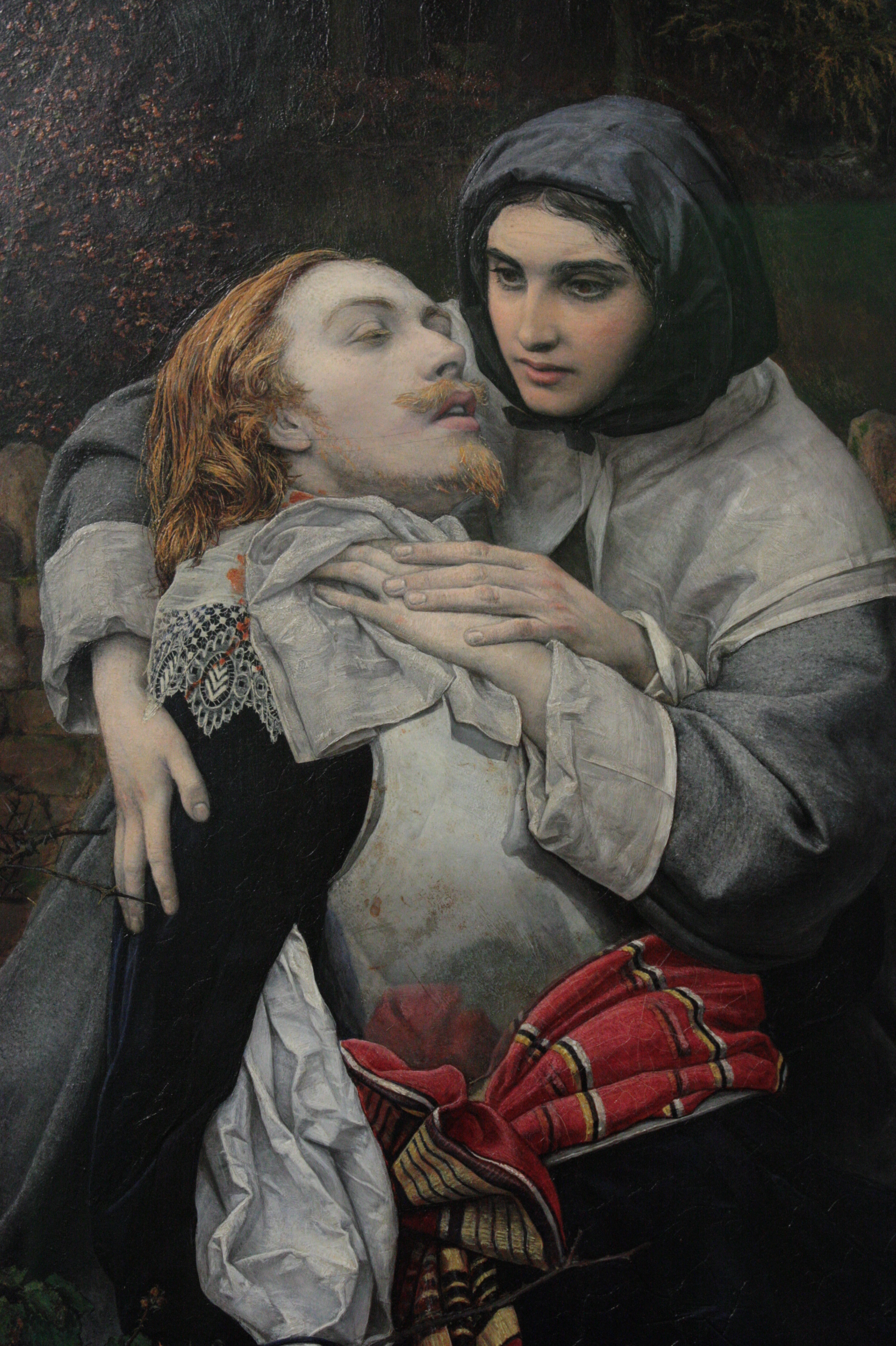
The Wounded Cavalier (detail of figures), W S Burton 1855

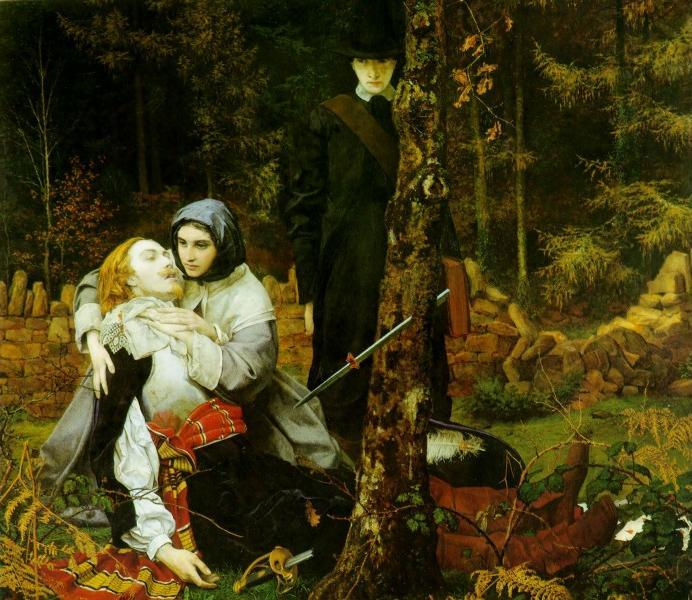
The Wounded Cavalier

William Shakespeare Burton (1 June 1824 – 26 January 1916) was an English genre and historical painter of the Victorian era. He is now remembered mainly for The Wounded Cavalier (1855).

== Life ==
Burton's grandfather was a printer, and his father was William Evans Burton, a comic actor and playwright who found popular success in the United States — while leaving his wife and son behind in London, with little money. An only child, the younger Burton worked at copying prints as a teenager. The dramatist and critic Tom Taylor was his sponsor and patron. Taylor helped the teen find work at the magazine Punch, a job designing capitals for illustrations (which provided much-needed income).

He was educated at King's College and the Royal Academy School, where he won a gold medal in 1852 for a painting on the subject of Samson and Delilah.

To paint his most famous work, The Wounded Cavalier, Burton was said to have dug a hole in the ground to stand in, so that he could paint the grass and ferns at eye level. The work shows a scene from the English Civil War: a Cavalier courier has been ambushed and wounded and is comforted by a Puritan maiden. Her jealous suitor, carrying a large Bible, looks on. The painting was shown at the Royal Academy Exhibition of 1856, although through a strange set of circumstances. According to Burton's own account, his picture was left in a remote room with its face turned to the wall (by porters who, Burton believed, had not been sufficiently bribed). The academician Charles West Cope found the picture, brought it to the hanging committee's attention, and even withdrew one of his own works from the show to make room for Burton's, which was hung next to William Holman Hunt's The Scapegoat.

The Wounded Cavalier was the artist's single flirtation with the Pre-Raphaelite movement of the 1850s. In later years Burton mainly devoted himself to painting religious subjects. Though plagued by poor health and personal difficulties, Burton remained active as a painter into his eighties. His wife Mina Elizabeth Burton was the author of a novel titled Ruling the Planets (1891).
