= The Lackawanna Valley =

Painting by George Inness

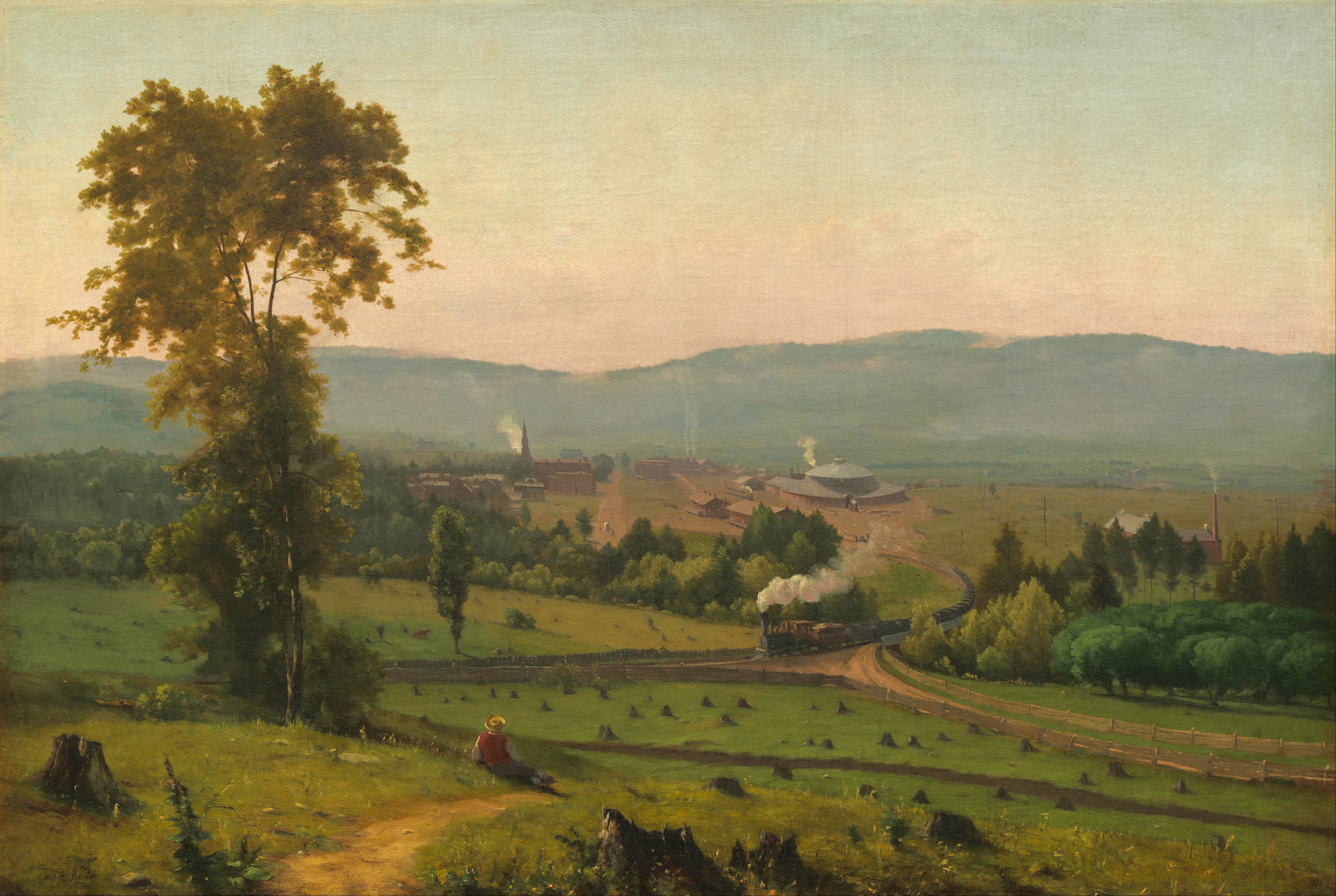
- Artist: George Inness
- Year: c. 1855
- Medium: Oil on canvas
- Dimensions: 86 cm × 128 cm (33 7/8 in × 50 1/4 in)
- Location: National Gallery of Art, Washington, D.C.

The Lackawanna Valley is a c. 1855 painting by the American artist George Inness. Painted in oil on canvas, it is one of Inness's most well-known works. It is in the National Gallery of Art collection in Washington, D.C.

The painting was commissioned from Inness in 1855 by John Jay Phelps, the first president of the Delaware, Lackawanna and Western Railroad, and was meant to be an advertisement for his railroad company. It depicts the Lackawanna Valley in northeastern Pennsylvania at the site of the railroad's first roundhouse in Scranton.
