= National Register of Historic Places listings in Page County, Virginia =

Location of Page County in Virginia

This is a list of the National Register of Historic Places listings in Page County, Virginia.

This is intended to be a complete list of the properties and districts on the National Register of Historic Places in Page County, Virginia, United States. The locations of National Register properties and districts for which the latitude and longitude coordinates are included below, may be seen in an online map.

There are 33 properties and districts listed on the National Register in the county, including 1 National Historic Landmark. Another property was once listed but has been removed.

This National Park Service list is complete through NPS recent listings posted March 6, 2026.

== Current listings ==
	Name on the Register	Image	Date listed	Location	City or town	Description
1	Almond	Almond	August 12, 2020 (#100005444)	2620 N. U.S. Route 340; 38°42′04″N 78°26′33″W	Luray	
2	Aventine Hall	Aventine Hall	February 26, 1970 (#70000820)	143 S. Court St. 38°39′44″N 78°27′52″W	Luray	
3	John Beaver House	John Beaver House	June 22, 1979 (#79003065)	North of Stanley on Longs Rd. 38°37′48″N 78°33′45″W	Salem	
4	Catherine Furnace	Catherine Furnace	January 21, 1974 (#74002141)	2 miles west of Newport in the George Washington National Forest; 38°33′28″N 78°38′08″W	Newport	
5	Fort Egypt	Fort Egypt	June 18, 1979 (#79003064)	Northwest of Hamburg off Egypt Bend Rd. 38°39′45″N 78°31′46″W	Hamburg	
6	Fort Philip Long	Fort Philip Long	April 11, 1973 (#73002048)	Off Leaksville Rd. on the Shenandoah River; 38°36′21″N 78°34′04″W	Stanley	
7	Graves Chapel and Cemetery	Graves Chapel and Cemetery	May 29, 2008 (#08000481)	457 Chapel Rd. 38°34′36″N 78°29′16″W	Stanley	
8	Green Hill Cemetery		July 31, 2023 (#100007753)	202 East Main St. 38°39′55″N 78°27′18″W	Luray	
9	Heiston-Strickler House	Heiston-Strickler House	November 16, 1978 (#78003037)	Northwest of Luray off Bixlers Ferry Rd. 38°42′01″N 78°29′48″W	Luray	
10	Jeremey's Run Site	Jeremey's Run Site	December 13, 1985 (#85003175)	Address Restricted	Luray	
11	Kanawha	Kanawha	August 5, 1999 (#99000968)	4 Jamison Rd. 38°39′42″N 78°27′35″W	Luray	
12	Koontz-Cave House		March 22, 2022 (#100007537)	5329 Farmview Rd. 38°34′38″N 78°27′53″W	Stanley vicinity	
13	Locust Grove	Locust Grove	December 8, 2015 (#15000879)	6601 Ida Rd. 38°34′28″N 78°27′33″W	Stanley	
14	Luray Downtown Historic District	Luray Downtown Historic District	May 22, 2003 (#03000438)	Roughly E. Main St., W. Main St., S. Court St., and S. Broad St. 38°39′56″N 78°27′44″W	Luray	
15	Luray Norfolk and Western Passenger Station	Luray Norfolk and Western Passenger Station	January 27, 2000 (#99001718)	Junction of Campbell St. with the Norfolk Southern Railway; 38°39′50″N 78°27′36″W	Luray	
16	Massanutton Heights	Massanutton Heights	July 30, 1976 (#76002117)	West of Luray on U.S. Route 211; 38°38′08″N 78°34′10″W	Luray	
17	Mauck's Meetinghouse	Mauck's Meetinghouse	June 18, 1976 (#76002116)	Off U.S. Route 211; 38°39′30″N 78°30′47″W	Hamburg	
18	Milford Battlefield	Milford Battlefield	August 11, 2004 (#04000854)	U.S. Route 340 and Overall Rd. 38°48′19″N 78°20′47″W	Overall	Extends into Warren County
19	Mount Calvary Lutheran Church	Mount Calvary Lutheran Church	June 3, 2008 (#98001068)	279 Somers Rd. 38°37′48″N 78°25′23″W	Luray	
20	Page County Bridge No. 1990	Page County Bridge No. 1990	May 15, 2008 (#08000423)	U.S. Route 340; 38°48′22″N 78°20′56″W	Overall	Extends into Warren County
21	Page County Courthouse	Page County Courthouse	June 25, 1973 (#73002047)	116 S. Court St. 38°39′52″N 78°27′54″W	Luray	
22	Abram and Sallie Printz Farm	Abram and Sallie Printz Farm	August 12, 1999 (#99001006)	597 Rosedale Ln. 38°37′26″N 78°24′18″W	Luray	
23	Redwell-Isabella Furnace Historic District	Redwell-Isabella Furnace Historic District	July 27, 2005 (#05000762)	Between Yagers Rd. and Hawksbill Creek on the northern side of Luray; 38°40′50″N 78°27′30″W	Luray	
24	Ruffner House	Ruffner House	January 24, 2002 (#01001515)	440 Ruffner House Ln. 38°40′10″N 78°27′18″W	Luray	
25	Shenandoah Historic District	Shenandoah Historic District	May 27, 2004 (#04000554)	Parts of 1st, 2nd, 3rd, 4th, 5th, 6th, 7th, 8th, Denver, Long, and H Sts., and Central, Maryland, Pennsylvania, and Virginia Aves. 38°29′16″N 78°37′26″W	Shenandoah	
26	Shenandoah Land and Improvement Company Office	Shenandoah Land and Improvement Company Office	July 14, 1978 (#78003038)	201 Maryland Ave. 38°29′03″N 78°37′22″W	Shenandoah	
27	Skyline Drive Historic District	Skyline Drive Historic District	April 28, 1997 (#97000375)	Shenandoah National Park, from the northern entrance station at Front Royal to the southern entrance station at Rockfish Gap; also within Shenandoah National Park, the areas known as Headquarters, Big Meadows, Dickey Ridge, Simmons Gap, and Piney River; also within Shenandoah National Park, the Skyland, Lewis Mountain, and Big Meadows; 38°32′50″N 78°24′54″W	Luray	Second and third sets of boundaries represent boundary increases of September 19, 1997 and December 5, 2003; designated a National Historic Landmark on October 6, 2008
28	Isaac Spitler House	Isaac Spitler House	May 23, 1997 (#97000486)	2948 Oak Forest Ln. 38°37′43″N 78°30′16″W	Luray	
29	Stover House	Stover House	May 22, 1978 (#78003189)	North of Luray off Kiblee Hill Rd. 38°43′32″N 78°27′27″W	Luray	
30	Strickler–Louderback House	Strickler–Louderback House	November 22, 2000 (#00001441)	1001 Old Farm Rd. 38°32′04″N 78°34′52″W	Shenandoah	
31	Wall Brook Farm	Wall Brook Farm	November 22, 2002 (#02001375)	967 Longs Rd. 38°37′56″N 78°32′49″W	Luray	
32	Welfley-Shuler House	Welfley-Shuler House	December 22, 1999 (#99001604)	449 Shipyard Rd. 38°30′03″N 78°38′05″W	Shenandoah	
33	The White House	The White House	December 24, 2013 (#13000992)	1917 Kauffmans Mill Rd. 38°38′52″N 78°32′04″W	Luray	

== Former listing ==
	Name on the Register	Image	Date listed	Date removed	Location	City or town	Description
1	Fort Rodes		May 22, 1978 (#78003190)	March 19, 2001	NW of Luray off VA 615	Luray	Destroyed by fire in 1990

== See also ==
- List of National Historic Landmarks in Virginia
- National Register of Historic Places listings in Virginia
