= Peter Borst =

Peter Borst may refer to:

- Peter I. Borst (1797–1848), U.S. Representative from New York
- Peter Bouck Borst (1826–1882), active in the mid-19th century development of Page County, Virginia
