= Locust Grove (Page County, Virginia) =

Historic house in Virginia, United States

- U.S. National Register of Historic Places
- Virginia Landmarks Register
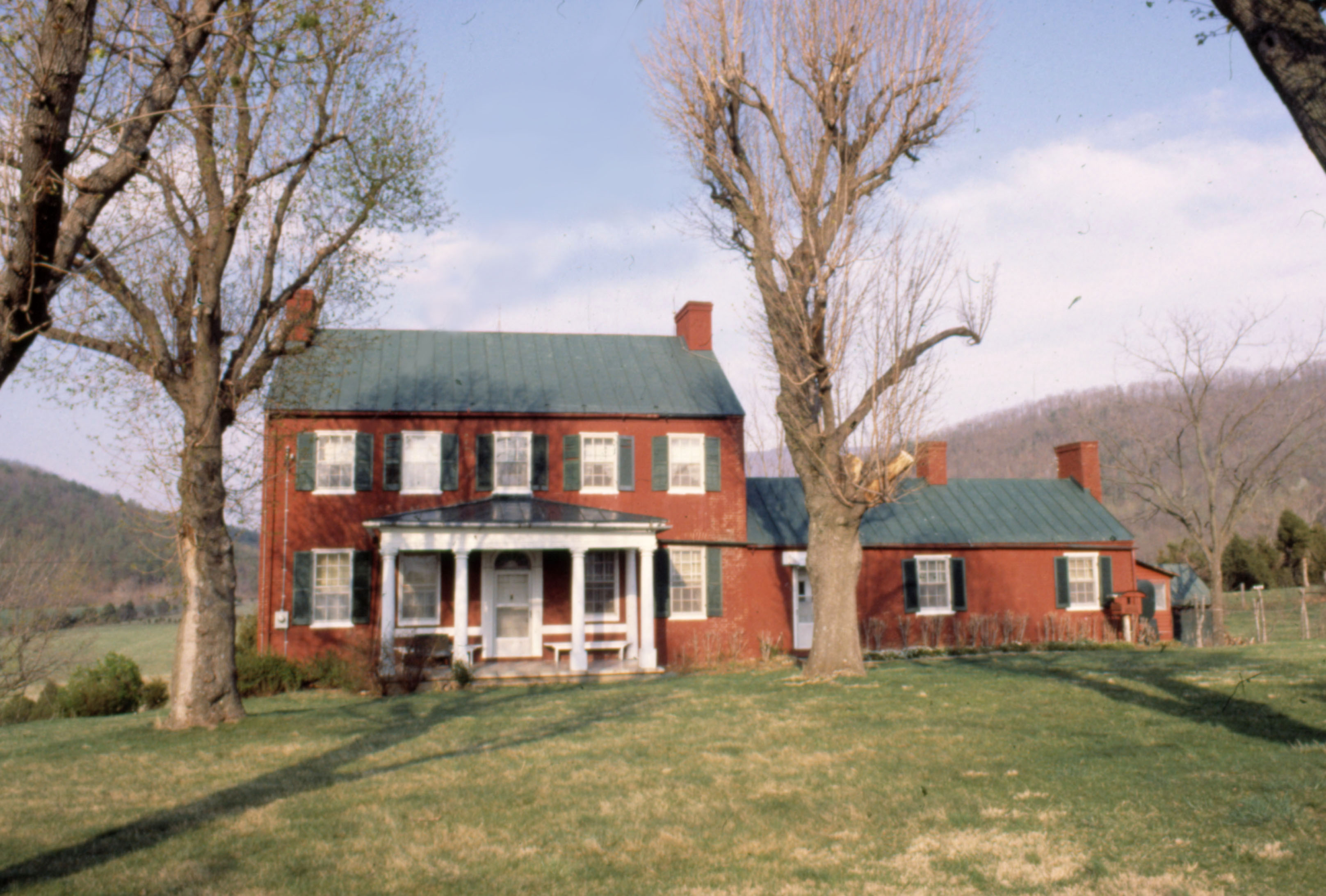

- Location within Virginia Location within the United States
- Location: 6601 Ida Rd., east of Stanley, Virginia
- Coordinates: 38°34′27″N 78°27′35″W
- Area: 2.7 acres (1.1 ha)
- Built: 1830
- Architectural style: Federal
- NRHP reference No.: 15000879
- VLR No.: 069-0145

Significant dates
- Added to NRHP: December 8, 2015
- Designated VLR: September 17, 2015

Locust Grove, also known as the Old Jacob Brubaker House, is a historic house in rural Page County, Virginia. It is located about 7 miles (11 km) southeast of Luray, at 6601 Ida Road (Virginia State Route 269). It is set on the south side of the road, just west of Chub Run. It is a 2 1/2-story brick house, with a gable roof, and a single-story side ell. Built about 1830, it is a good local example of Federal period style, retaining original interior floors, woodwork, and fireplace mantels.

The house was listed on the National Register of Historic Places in 2015.

== See also ==
- National Register of Historic Places listings in Page County, Virginia
