= The White House (Luray, Virginia) =

Historic house in Virginia, United States

- U.S. National Register of Historic Places
- Virginia Landmarks Register
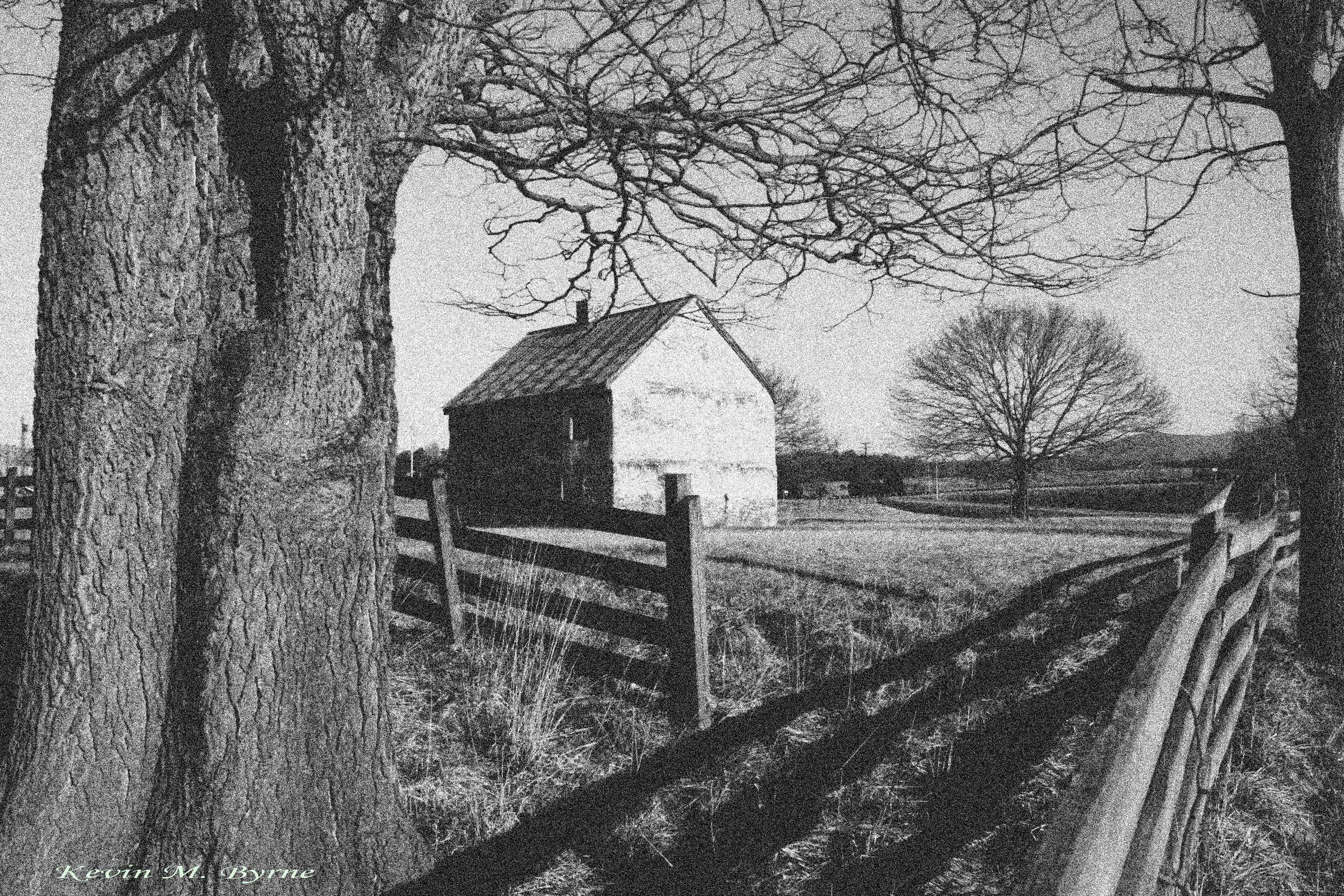
- The White House in 2007

- Location within Virginia Location within the United States
- Location: 1917 Kauffmans Mill Rd., Luray, Virginia
- Coordinates: 38°38′52″N 78°32′04″W
- Area: 14 acres (5.7 ha)
- Built: c. 1760
- Built by: Kauffman, Martin, II
- Architectural style: Rhenish
- NRHP reference No.: 13000992
- VLR No.: 069-0012

Significant dates
- Added to NRHP: December 24, 2013
- Designated VLR: November 15, 1977

The White House, also known as Kauffman House, is a historic home located at Luray, Page County, Virginia. It was built about 1760, and is a two-story, three-bay Rhenish stone house covered with stucco. It has a two-room central-chimney plan, consisting of a kuche and stube, with a barrel-vaulted cellar and a large storage loft.

It was listed on the National Register of Historic Places in 2013.
