= Forest Hills, Virginia =

Unincorporated community in Virginia, US

Coordinates: 38.65651°N 78.47167°W

Forest Hills is an unincorporated community in Page County, in the U.S. state of Virginia. The neighborhood is located in the southwestern portion of the Luray town limits.
