= Woodland Park, Page County, Virginia =

Unincorporated community in Virginia, US

Woodland Park is an unincorporated community north of Luray and just west of Hawksbill Creek in Page County, Virginia, United States. It lies at an elevation of 801 feet.
