= Andrew Broaddus (Virginia politician) =

American politician (died 1898)

- In office December 1, 1875 – April 4, 1877
- Preceded by: William O. Yager
- Succeeded by: H. M. Keyser
- Constituency: Page County

Personal details
- Died: June 13, 1898 Luray, Virginia, U.S.
- Resting place: Green Hill Cemetery
- Spouse: Bettie Lionberger
- Children: 5
- Occupation: Politician; clerk; newspaper editor

Andrew Broaddus (died June 13, 1898) was an American politician from Virginia. He served in the Virginia House of Delegates from 1875 to 1877.

== Career ==
Broaddus was a member of the Virginia House of Delegates, representing Page County from December 1, 1875, to April 4, 1877.

Broaddus was a clerk of the county and circuit courts of Page County.

Broaddus was one of the owners and editors of the Page Courier. He was also associated with the Page Valley Bank.

== Personal life ==
Broaddus married Bettie Lionberger, daughter of John Lionberger. They had five children. He was a member of the Main Street Baptist Church.

Broaddus died of a heart attack on June 13, 1898, aged about 59 years, at his home in Luray, Virginia. He was buried in Green Hill Cemetery.
