= Wall Brook Farm =

Historic house in Virginia, United States

- U.S. National Register of Historic Places
- Virginia Landmarks Register
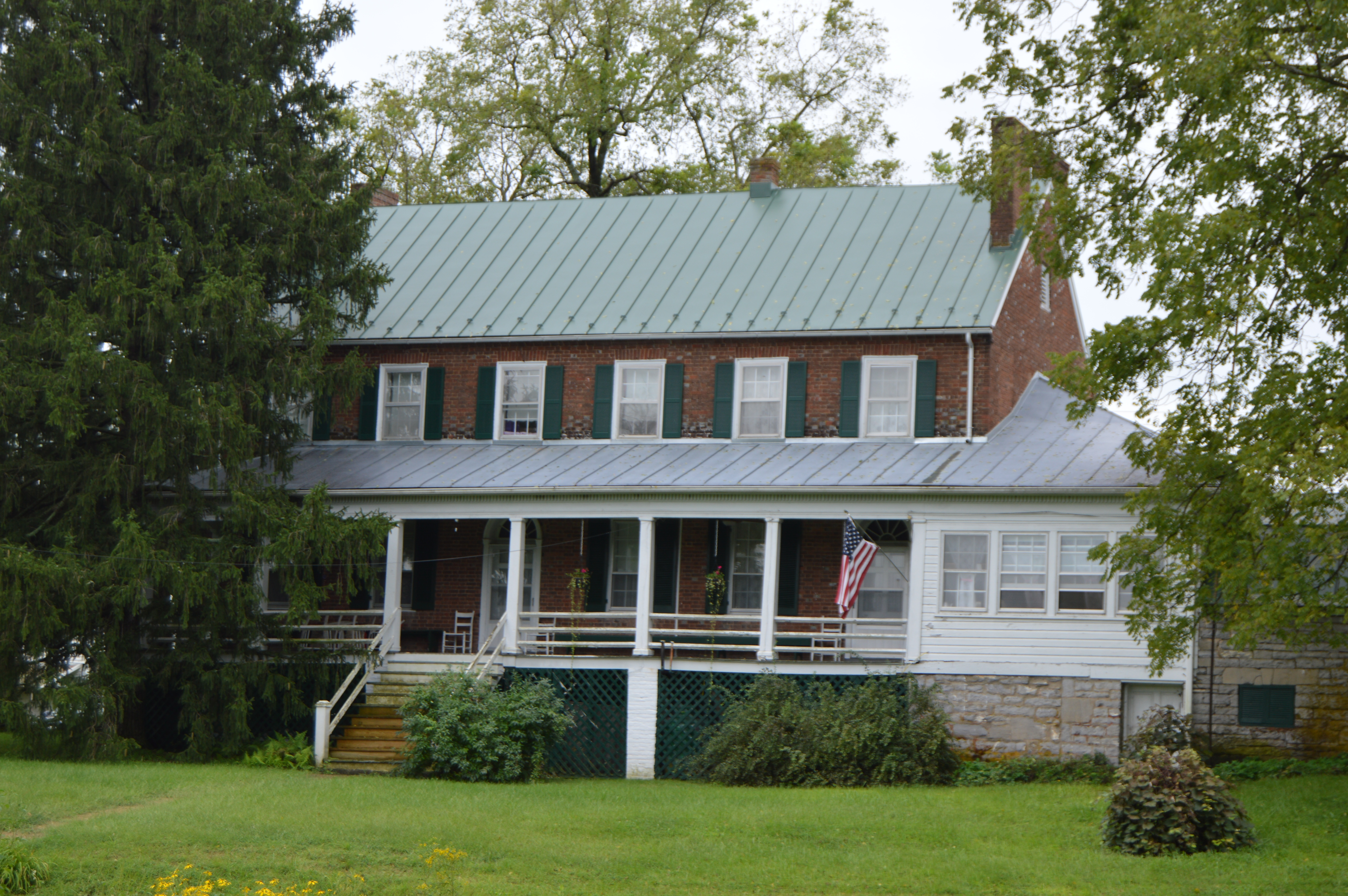
- Front of the house

- Location within Virginia Location within the United States
- Location: 967 Longs Rd., near Luray, Virginia
- Coordinates: 38°37′52″N 78°32′43″W
- Area: 88 acres (36 ha)
- Built: 1824
- Architectural style: Federal
- NRHP reference No.: 02001375
- VLR No.: 069-0011

Significant dates
- Added to NRHP: November 22, 2002
- Designated VLR: September 11, 2002

Wall Brook Farm is a historic home and farm complex located near Luray, Page County, Virginia. The farmhouse was built about 1824, and is a two-story, six-bay, Federal style brick dwelling with a gable roof. It has a center-passage-plan and 1 1/2-story frame addition linked to a gambrel-roofed garage. The front facade features a full-facade one-story front porch. Located on the property are the contributing meathouse / wash house (c. 1890), wall and foot bridge, barn (1870s), dairy barn and milkhouse (c. 1950), shed (c. 1950), and the Brubaker Cemetery.

It was listed on the National Register of Historic Places in 2002.
