= Page County Courthouse (Virginia) =

Historic courthouse in Virginia, US

- U.S. National Register of Historic Places
- U.S. Historic district – Contributing property
- Virginia Landmarks Register
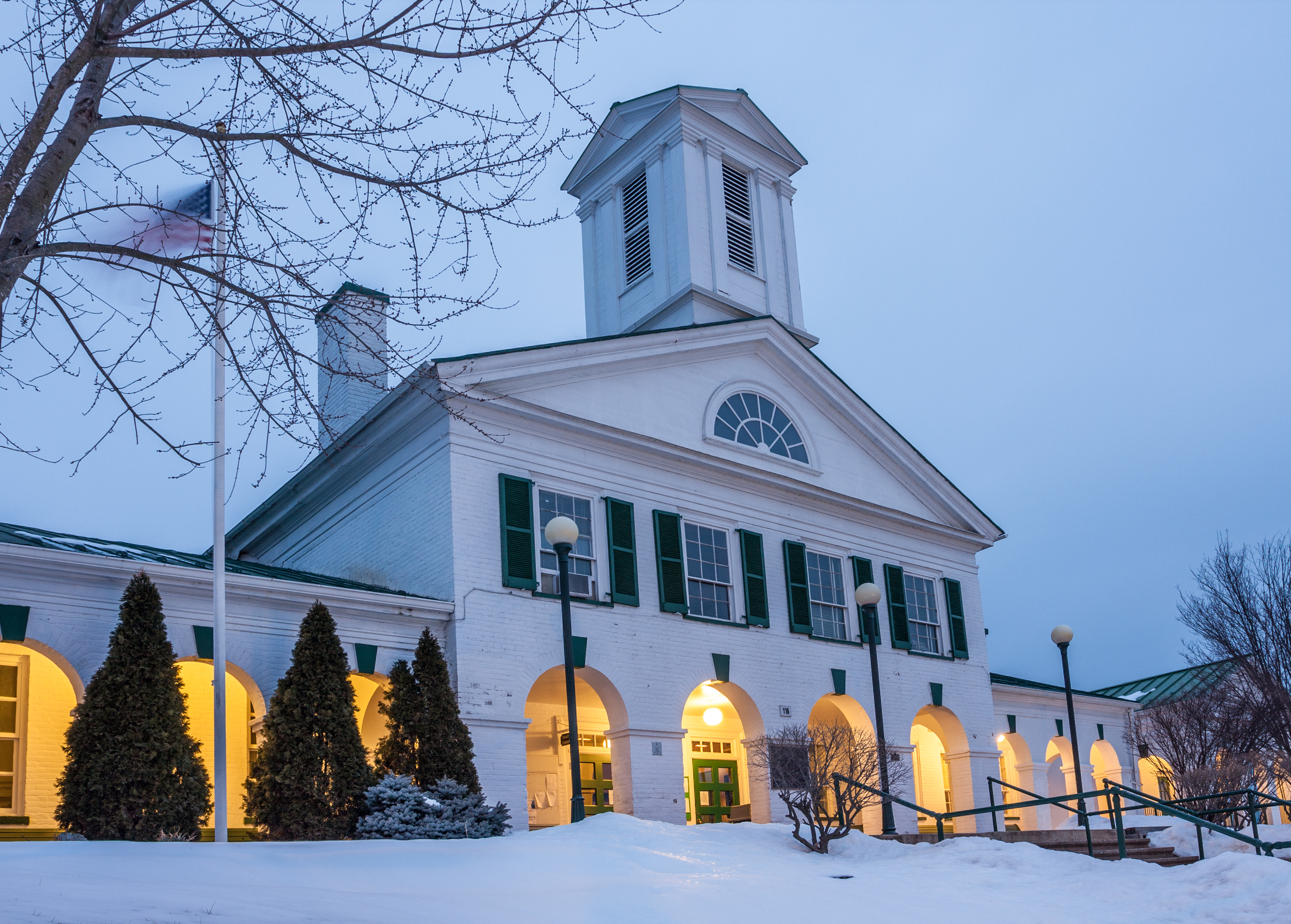
- Page County Courthouse, February 2014

- Location within Virginia Location within the United States
- Location: 116 S. Court St., Luray, Virginia
- Coordinates: 38°39′51″N 78°27′55″W
- Area: 9 acres (3.6 ha)
- Built: 1832-1833
- Built by: Crawford, Malcolm; Philips, William B.
- Architectural style: Jeffersonian
- NRHP reference No.: 73002047
- VLR No.: 159-0004

Significant dates
- Added to NRHP: June 25, 1973
- Designated VLR: January 16, 1973

Page County Courthouse is a historic courthouse building located at Luray, Page County, Virginia. It was built in 1832–1833, and consists of a two-story, four-bay court house with three-bay, one-story wings. The four-bays of the pedimented gable facade open onto a ground floor arcade with rounded arches in the Jeffersonian Roman Revival style. It is topped by a cupola with coupled pilasters and four pedimented gables. It was built by Malcolm Crawford and William B. Philips, who worked under Thomas Jefferson on the University of Virginia.

It was listed on the National Register of Historic Places in 1973. It is a contributing property in the Luray Downtown Historic District.
