= Peter I. Borst =

American politician

Member of the U.S. House of Representatives from New York's 12th district
- In office March 4, 1829 – March 3, 1831
- Preceded by: John I. De Graff
- Succeeded by: Joseph Bouck

Personal details
- Born: April 24, 1797 Middleburgh, New York, US
- Died: November 14, 1848 (aged 51) Middleburgh, New York, US
- Party: Jacksonian Party
- Spouse: Catherine Becker Borst
- Children: 3, including Peter Bouck Borst
- Profession: farmer and politician

Military service
- Allegiance: United States
- Branch/service: New York State Militia

Peter I. Borst (April 24, 1797 – November 14, 1848) was an American farmer and politician who served one term as a U.S. representative from New York from 1829 to 1831.

== Biography ==
Born in Middleburgh, New York, Borst attended the common schools and became a successful farmer on his estate, "The Hook" and was an officer of the Schoharie County Agricultural Society. He was married to Catherine Becker Borst. At least three of Borst's children (Addison, John B., and Peter Bouck Borst) moved from New York to Page County, Virginia in years prior to the American Civil War. Addison and John served in the 10th Virginia Infantry, while Peter (23 June 1826 – 24 April 1882) represented the county in the 1861 Virginia Convention, voting both times in favor of secession.

== Career ==
=== Early political career ===
Borst served as an officer of New York State Militia and on the staff of Governor William C. Bouck. He held various local positions.

=== Tenure in Congress ===
Elected as a Jacksonian to the Twenty-first Congress, Borst served from March 4, 1829, to March 3, 1831. During that time, he served as a member of the committee appointed by the county board of supervisors to oversee the building of the first county almshouse in 1838.

== Death ==
Borst died in Middleburg, New York, on November 14, 1848 (age 51 years, 204 days). He is interred at a family graveyard, on his estate, "The Hook," in Schoharie County, New York.

U.S. House of Representatives
Preceded by John I. De Graff	Member of the U.S. House of Representatives from New York's 12th congressional district March 4, 1829 – March 3, 1831	Succeeded by Joseph Bouck
