= Luray Downtown Historic District =

Historic district in Virginia, United States

- U.S. National Register of Historic Places
- U.S. Historic district
- Virginia Landmarks Register
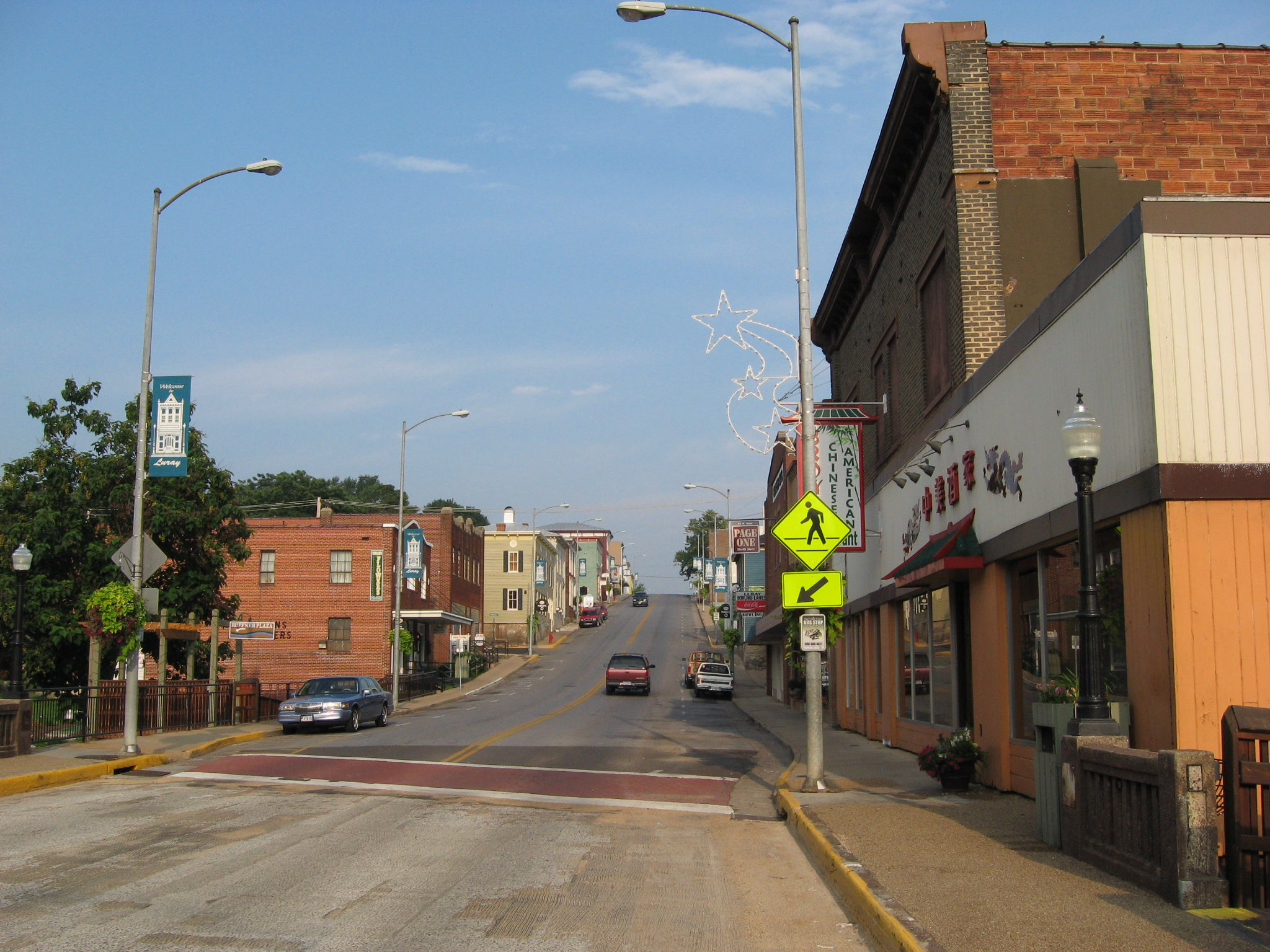
- Downtown Luray, July 2008

- Location within Virginia Location within the United States
- Location: Roughly E. Main St., W. Main St., S. Court St., and s. Broad St., Luray, Virginia
- Coordinates: 38.66561°N 78.46229°W
- Area: 35 acres (14 ha)
- Built: 1831
- NRHP reference No.: 03000438
- VLR No.: 159-5064

Significant dates
- Added to NRHP: May 22, 2003
- Designated VLR: March 19, 2003

Luray Downtown Historic District is a national historic district located at Luray, Page County, Virginia. The district includes 75 contributing buildings, 1 contributing structure, and 3 contributing objects in the central business district of the town of Luray. They include residential, commercial, governmental, and institutional buildings in a variety of popular 19th and 20th century architectural styles. Notable buildings include the Skyline Building (c. 1925, c. 1950), Luray Motor Company (1935), Luray United Methodist Church (1899-1900), Luray Post Office (1938), Page County Record Building (1912), Bridge Theatre (Dove1 Building), Casey Jones Overall Factory (1922), Mansion Inn, Jordan-McKim Building, Hotel Laurance, and Mimslyn Inn (1930-1931). The contributing objects include the Confederate Monument (1918) and clock. Located in the district are the separately listed Luray Norfolk and Western Passenger Station and Page County Courthouse.

It was listed on the National Register of Historic Places in 2003.
