= Hamburg, Page County, Virginia =

Human settlement in Page County, Virginia, United States

Coordinates: 38°39′29″N 78°30′52″W

Hamburg is an unincorporated community in Page County in the U.S. state of Virginia. For a time, Herbert Barbee's studio was located there.

Fort Egypt and Mauck's Meetinghouse are listed on the National Register of Historic Places.
