= Spring View, Virginia =

Unincorporated community in Virginia, US

Coordinates: 38°40′28″N 78°25′27″W

Spring View is an unincorporated community in Page County, in the U.S. state of Virginia.
