= Mauck's Meetinghouse =

Historic church in Virginia, United States

- U.S. National Register of Historic Places
- Virginia Landmarks Register
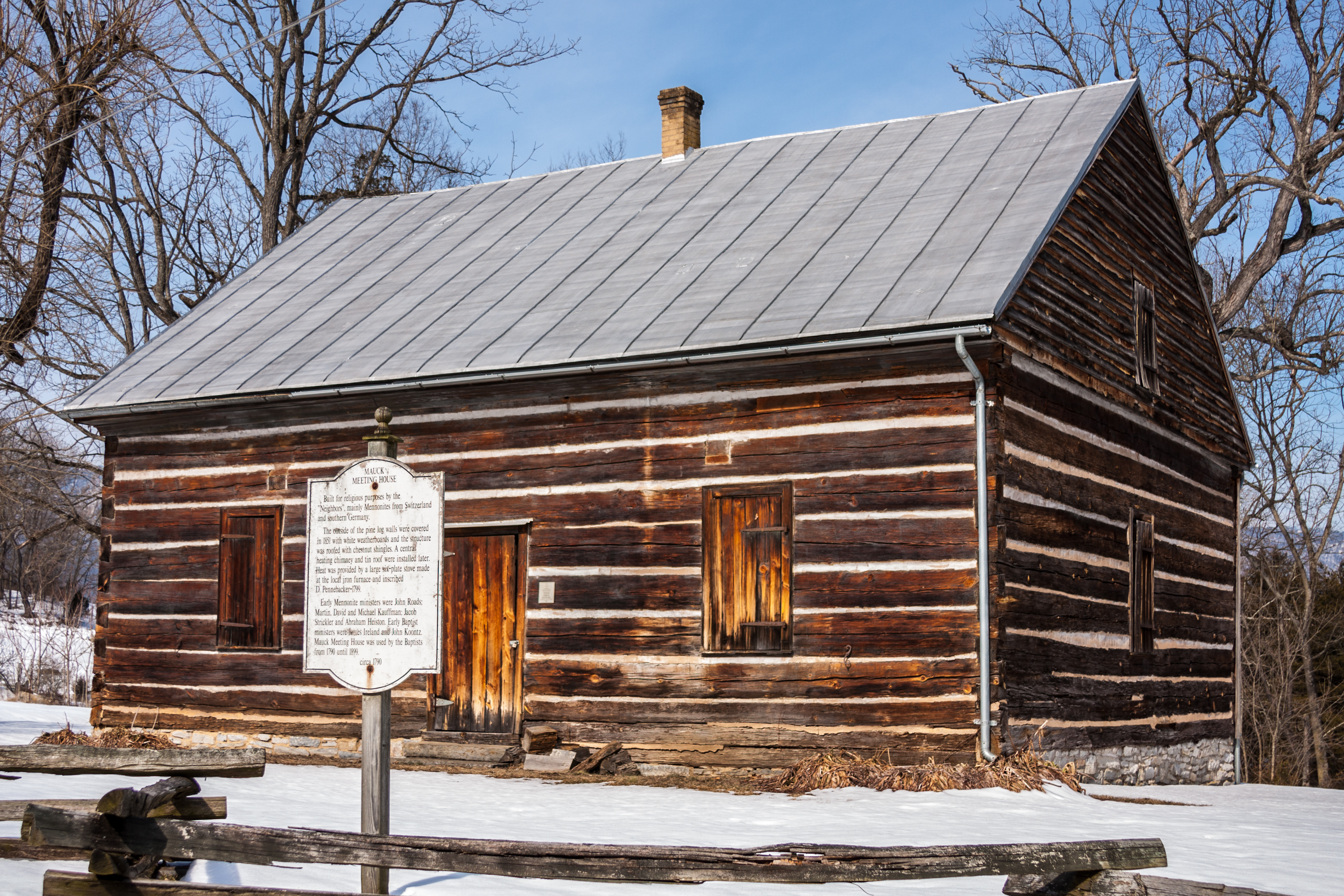
- Mauck's Meetinghouse, February 2014

- Location within Virginia Location within the United States
- Location: Off U.S. 211, Hamburg, Virginia
- Coordinates: 38°39′30″N 78°30′45″W
- Area: less than one acre
- Built: 1795–1800
- Architectural style: Federal
- NRHP reference No.: 76002116
- VLR No.: 069-0006

Significant dates
- Added to NRHP: June 18, 1976
- Designated VLR: December 16, 1975

Mauck's Meetinghouse, also known as Mill Creek Church, is a historic Mennonite-Baptist meeting house located at Hamburg, Page County, Virginia. It was built between 1795 and 1800, and is a 1 1/2-story, planked-log structure measuring approximately 36 feet by 29 feet. The building was remodeled about 1830, with the addition of weatherboard siding (since removed) and interior balconies. The entrances feature raised six-panel Federal doors and the architrave is a simple one-section molding.

It was listed on the National Register of Historic Places in 1976.

Mauck's Meetinghouse is owned by the Page County Heritage Association and is open the first Saturday of the month from May through September.
