= Isaac Spitler House =

Historic house in Virginia, United States

- U.S. National Register of Historic Places
- Virginia Landmarks Register
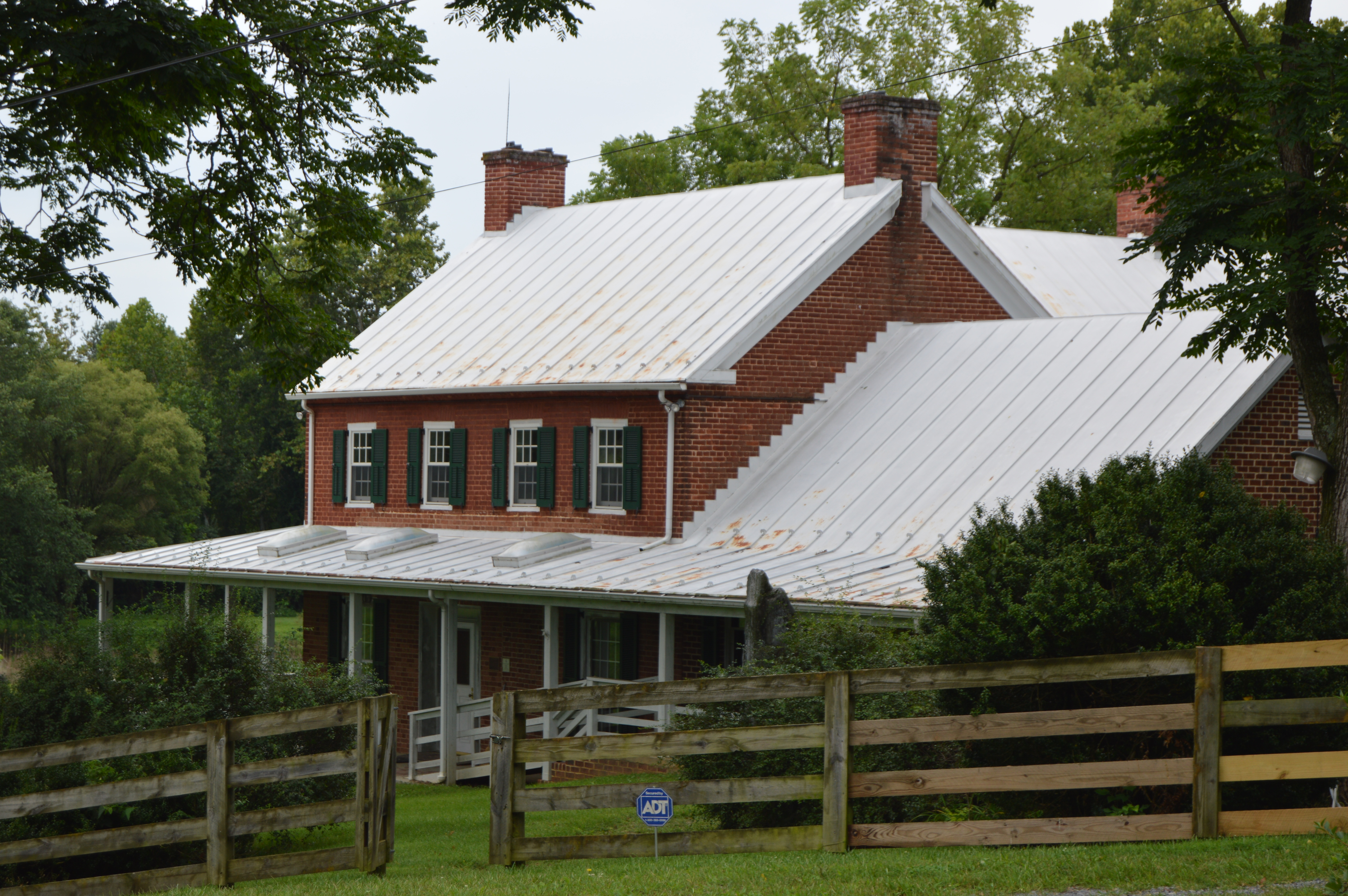
- Front of the house

- Location within Virginia Location within the United States
- Location: 2948 Oak Forest Ln., near Luray, Virginia
- Coordinates: 38°37′42″N 78°30′20″W
- Area: 4 acres (1.6 ha)
- Built: c. 1740, 1826, 1857
- Built by: John Spitler
- Architectural style: Colonial, Federal
- NRHP reference No.: 97000486
- VLR No.: 069-0007

Significant dates
- Added to NRHP: May 23, 1997
- Designated VLR: March 19, 1997

Isaac Spitler House is a historic home and farm complex located near Luray, Page County, Virginia. The farmhouse was built in 1826, and is a two-story, brick dwelling with a gable roof. A wing was added in 1857 to create an L-shaped building. Located on the property are the contributing remains of a double-unit stone outbuilding which sheltered and sustained the original settlers (about 1738–1739) and two succeeding generations; chimney and remains of a log building; stone wellhouse and dairy; large vernacular Switzer or Swisher barn dated to the 1750s; combination wagon shed and corn crib; a set of stone steps which were used to assist persons in mounting horses and getting into wagons; two eight-foot-high stone gateposts; and a small family cemetery containing nine graves.

It was listed on the National Register of Historic Places in 1997.
