= Massanutton Heights =

Historic house in Virginia, United States

- U.S. National Register of Historic Places
- Virginia Landmarks Register
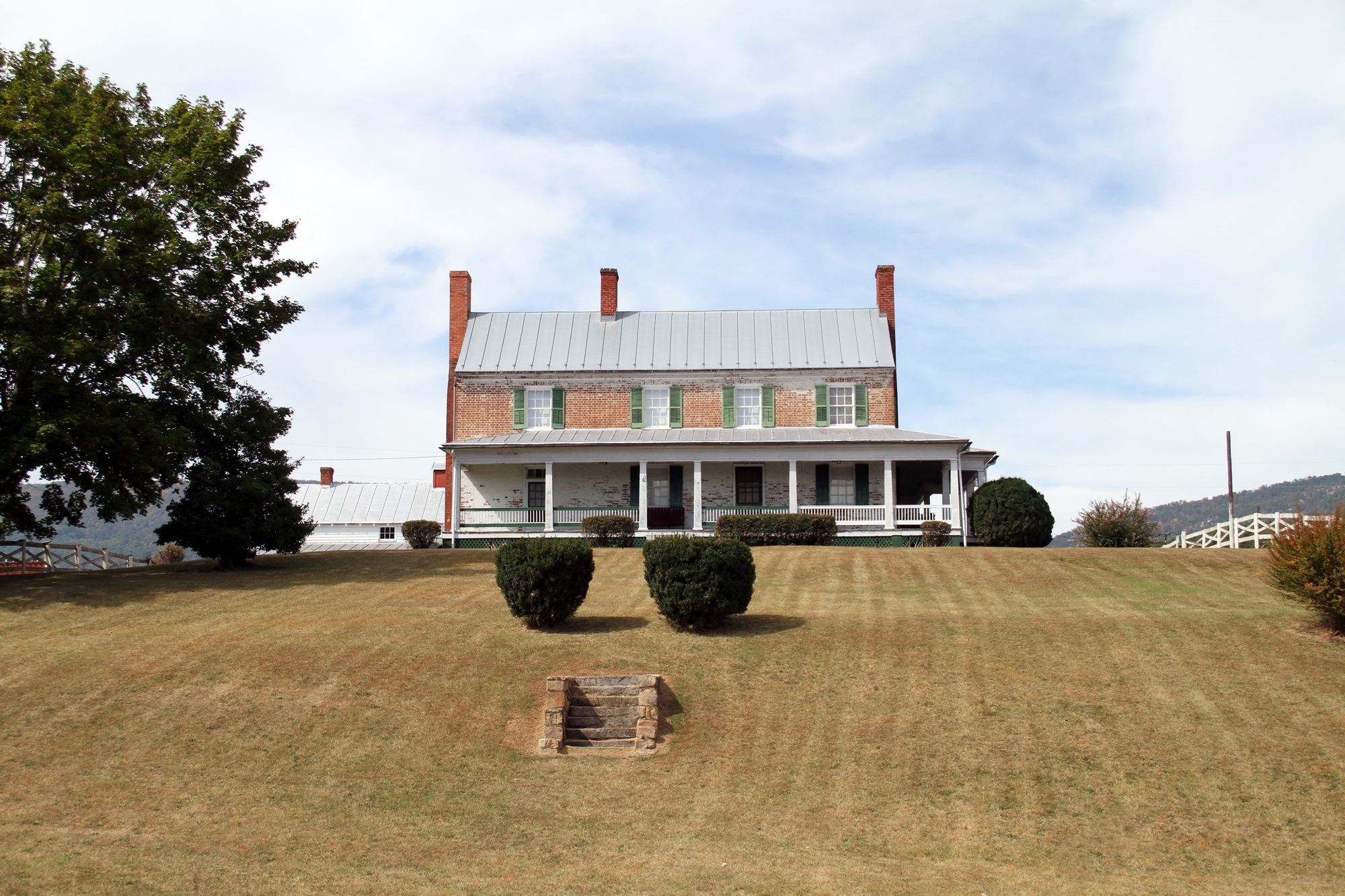
- Front of the house

- Location within Virginia Location within the United States
- Location: W of Luray on U.S. 211, Luray, Virginia
- Coordinates: 38°38′15″N 78°34′08″W
- Area: 144 acres (58 ha)
- Built: c. 1820
- Built by: Burner, John R.
- Architectural style: Federal
- NRHP reference No.: 76002117
- VLR No.: 069-0123

Significant dates
- Added to NRHP: July 30, 1976
- Designated VLR: February 17, 1976

Massanutton Heights is a historic home located near Luray, Page County, Virginia. It was built about 1820, and is a large two-story, four-bay, Federal style brick dwelling with a side gable roof. It has two exterior end chimneys and one interior chimney. The house has a three-room, single-pile plan with closed winder stairs in the southwest corners of the two end rooms. A large, two-story frame addition and full-width front porch were constructed in 1924 when the building was used as a boarding house. The interior features painted decorations in the first floor parlor.

It was listed on the National Register of Historic Places in 1976.

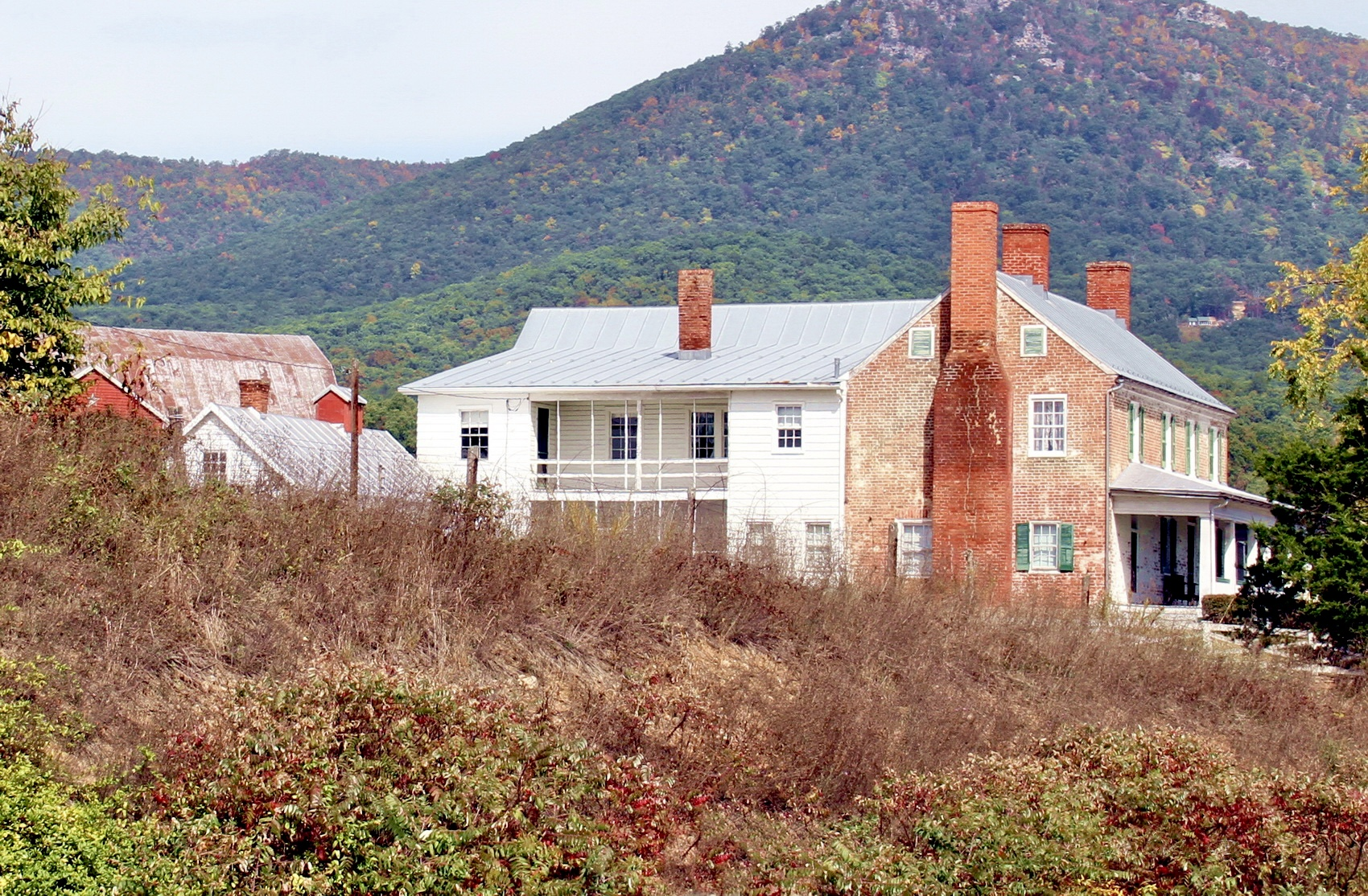
Side of the house
