= Abram and Sallie Printz Farm =

Historic house in Virginia, United States

- U.S. National Register of Historic Places
- Virginia Landmarks Register
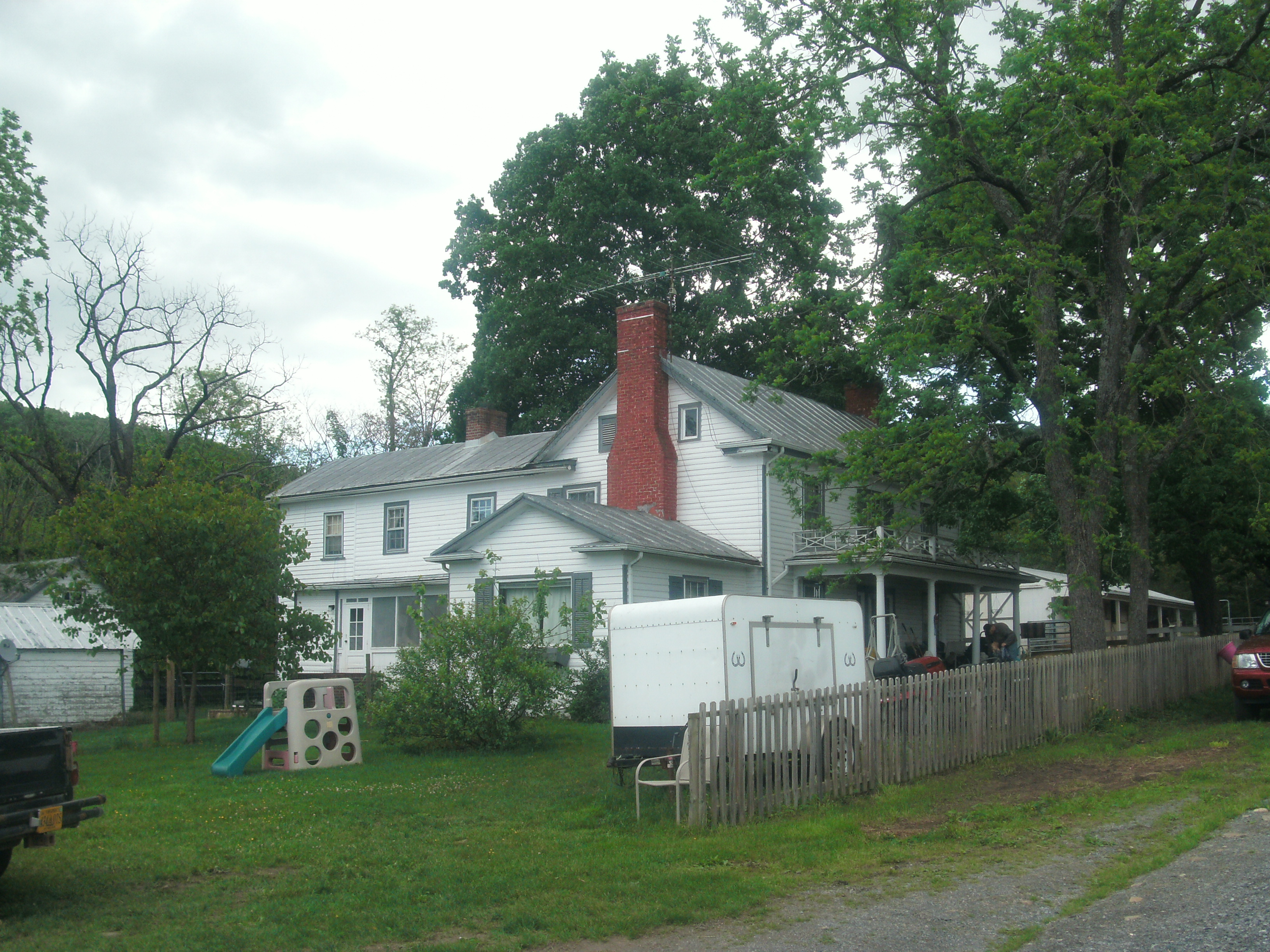
- The farmhouse in May, 2016

- Location within Virginia Location within the United States
- Location: 597 Rosedale Ln., near Luray, Virginia
- Coordinates: 38°37′21″N 78°24′24″W
- Area: 25.8 acres (10.4 ha)
- Built: 1872, c. 1900
- Built by: Sours, Raymond
- Architectural style: Greek Revival, Late Victorian
- NRHP reference No.: 99001006
- VLR No.: 069-5098

Significant dates
- Added to NRHP: August 12, 1999
- Designated VLR: June 16, 1999

Abram and Sallie Printz Farm, also known as Mountain View Farm, is a historic home and farm located near Luray, Page County, Virginia, United States. The farmhouse was built about 1872, and is a two-story, frame dwelling with vernacular Greek Revival and Victorian interior design elements. A two-story rear ell was added about 1900. Also on the property are the contributing washhouse, meat house, garage, bank barn, corn crib and wagon shelter, and the foundations of three buildings.

It was listed on the National Register of Historic Places in 1999.
