= Luray station =

Historic train station in Virginia, US

- Luray Norfolk and Western Passenger Station
- U.S. National Register of Historic Places
- U.S. Historic district – Contributing property
- Virginia Landmarks Register
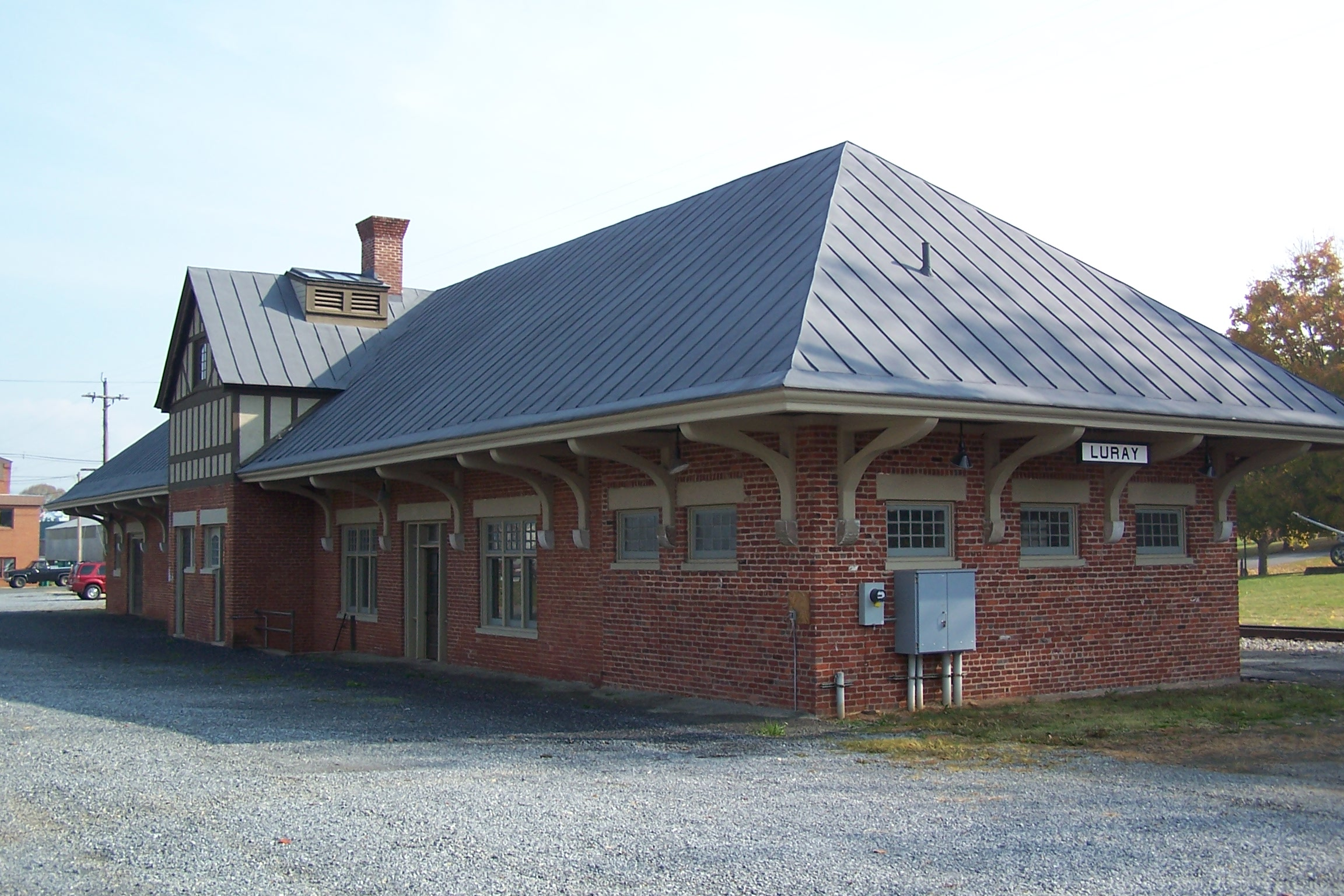
- The station in 2007

- Location within Virginia Location within the United States
- Location: Jct. Campbell St. and Norfolk Southern Railway, Luray, Virginia
- Coordinates: 38°39′50″N 78°27′38″W
- Area: .7 acres (0.28 ha)
- Built: 1906
- Architect: Charles S. Churchill
- Architectural style: Queen Anne, Tudor Revival
- NRHP reference No.: 99001718
- VLR No.: 159-0024

Significant dates
- Added to NRHP: January 27, 2000
- Designated VLR: December 1, 1999

The Luray Norfolk and Western Passenger Station is a historic train station located in Luray, Virginia, United States. The Shenandoah Valley Railroad reached Luray in 1881 and constructed a station near where the present station is located. Shortly after the Norfolk and Western Railway absorbed the Shenandoah Valley Railroad in 1890, plans arose to construct a new station in Luray. This station, which still stands, was constructed in 1906 and was designed by the railroad's Chief Engineer, Charles S. Churchill. The structure was partially destroyed by fire in 1908 when it was struck by lightning; however, it was soon thereafter reconstructed according to the original design. The station is a one-story brick structure featuring a hip roof. The building was converted to freight use around 1960 and was sold to the town of Luray by the Norfolk and Western's successor, the Norfolk Southern Railway, in 1999.

The station was listed on the National Register of Historic Places on January 27, 2000. It is a contributing property in the Luray Downtown Historic District.

The building was rehabilitated by the Town of Luray in 2009 and is currently home to the Page County Railway Museum, the Luray-Page County Visitor Center, and offices for the Luray Downtown Initiative and the Luray-Page County Chamber of Commerce.

Preceding station	Norfolk and Western Railway	Following station
Grottoes toward Roanoke	Hagerstown – Roanoke	Front Royal toward Hagerstown
