= Fort Egypt =

Historic house in Virginia, United States

- U.S. National Register of Historic Places
- Virginia Landmarks Register
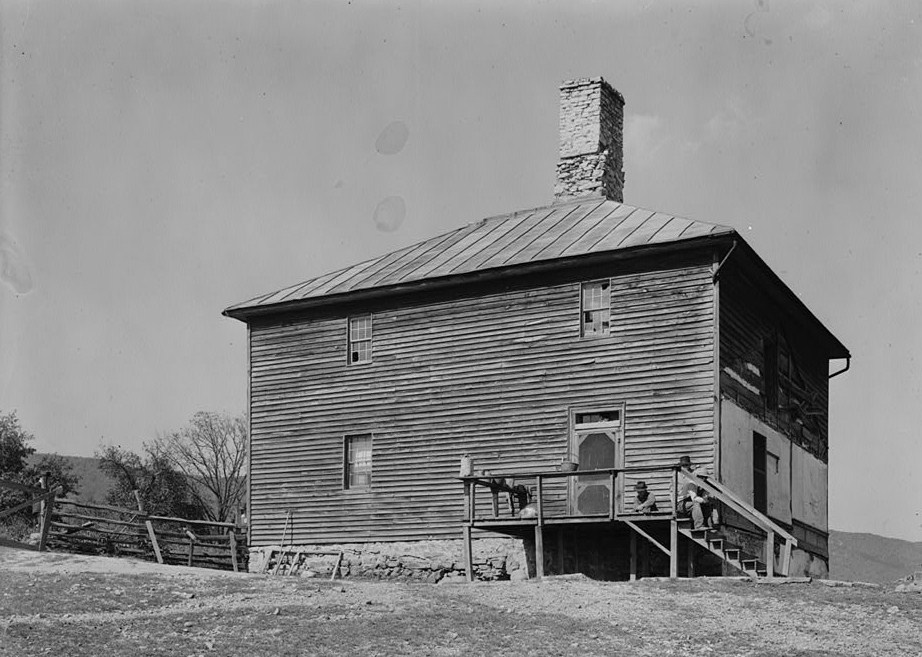
- Fort Egypt

- Location within Virginia Location within the United States
- Nearest city: Hamburg, Virginia
- Coordinates: 38°39′44″N 78°31′47″W
- Area: 10 acres (4.0 ha)
- Architect: Strickler, John
- Architectural style: Continental
- NRHP reference No.: 79003064
- VLR No.: 069-0001

Significant dates
- Added to NRHP: June 18, 1979
- Designated VLR: February 26, 1979

Fort Egypt, a large log house, is a historic landmark in Page County, Virginia and is listed in the National Register of Historic Places (#79003064).

Built of 20"-25" diameter logs dovetailed at the corners, Fort Egypt has a massive stone chimney in the center of the house. It contains a fortified cellar with loop holes, possibly designed for protection against Indian attacks. No known Indian attacks occurred at Fort Egypt.

The building was built about 1758 by Jacob Strickler (one of the early leaders of the Mennonite Church), and his descendants lived here for many generations. Several of the rooms are very large and were probably used for meetings of the Mennonite Church in this community before any church buildings were built.

This home is located near the center of the 1,000 acre (4 km^{2}) tract granted to the pioneer Abraham Strickler in 1735 and called the Egypt Bend tract.

The building was restored by its current owners and is in an excellent state of preservation.
