= Kanawha (Luray, Virginia) =

Historic house in Virginia, United States

- U.S. National Register of Historic Places
- Virginia Landmarks Register
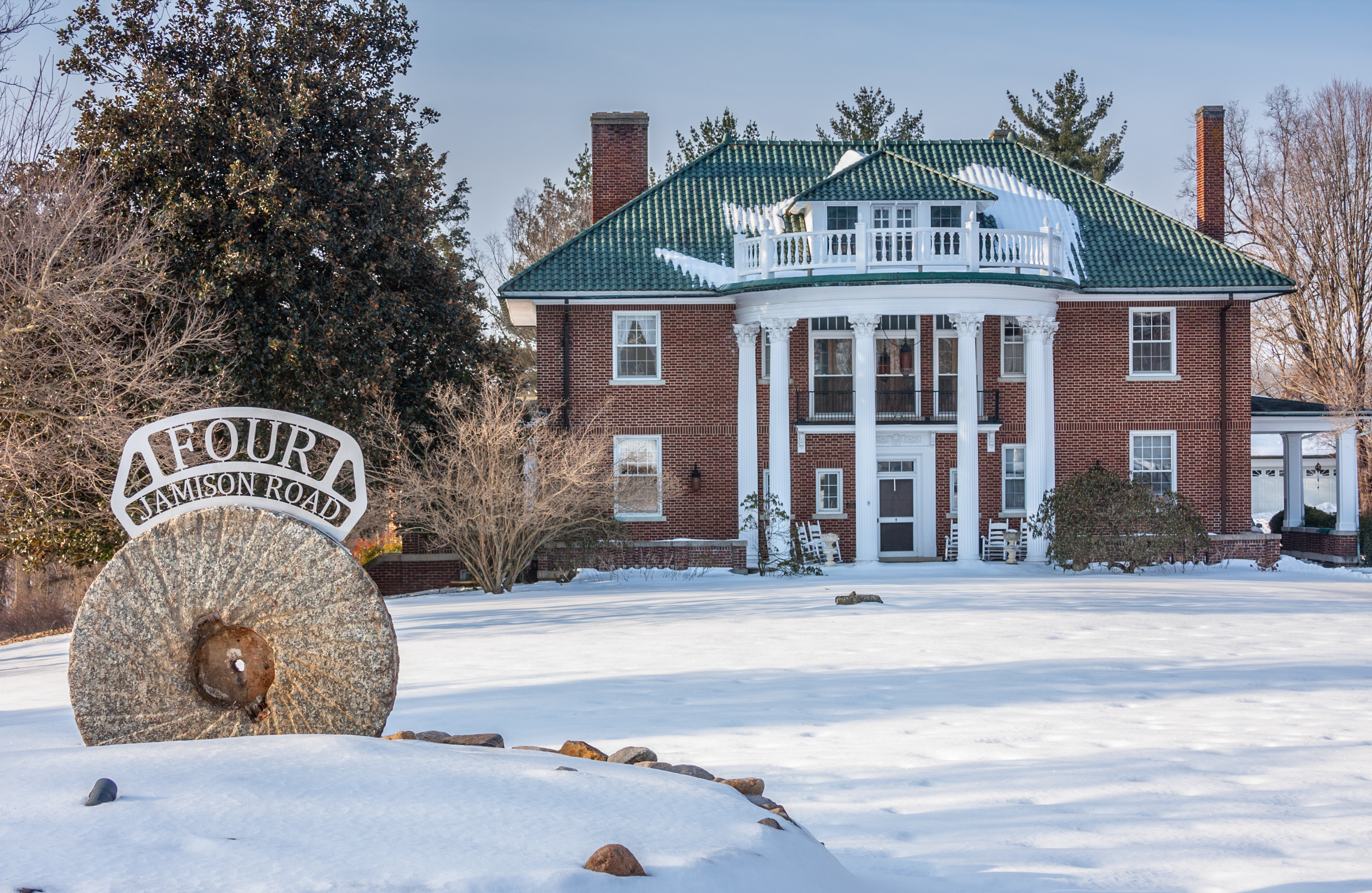
- Kanawha, February 2014

- Location within Virginia Location within the United States
- Location: 4 Jamison Rd., Luray, Virginia
- Coordinates: 38°39′42″N 78°27′36″W
- Area: 5 acres (2.0 ha)
- Built: 1921
- Architect: Ragan, George R.
- Architectural style: Classical Revival
- NRHP reference No.: 99000968
- VLR No.: 159-5030

Significant dates
- Added to NRHP: August 5, 1999
- Designated VLR: June 16, 1999

Kanawha, also known as Tuckahoe, is a historic home located at Luray, Page County, Virginia. It was built in 1921, and is a 2 1/2-story, Classical Revival style brick and tile-block dwelling on a poured-concrete foundation. It has a hipped roof covered with green Spanish tiles. The front facade features a semicircular Corinthian order portico. The house also has an enclosed Doric order rear portico, a porte-cochère, large hipped dormers, and a symmetrical composition. Also on the property are contributing gate pillars (c. 1923), an outbuilding (c. 1920), and weirs (Houn Spring) (c. 1881). The property was developed by Luray businessman and mayor Vernon H. Ford.

It was listed on the National Register of Historic Places in 1999.
