= Stover House =

Historic house in Virginia, United States

- U.S. National Register of Historic Places
- Virginia Landmarks Register
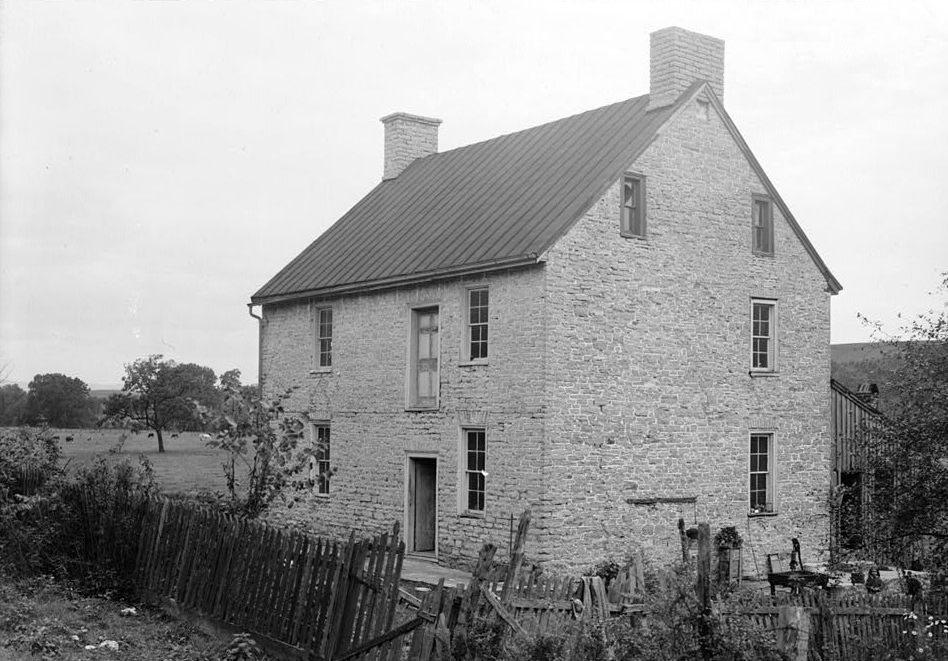
- HABS image of Stover House

- Location within Virginia Location within the United States
- Location: N of Luray off VA 660, near Luray, Virginia
- Coordinates: 38°43′32″N 78°27′28″W
- Area: 4 acres (1.6 ha)
- Built by: Stover, Samuel
- Architectural style: Flurkuchenhaus
- NRHP reference No.: 78003189
- VLR No.: 069-0005

Significant dates
- Added to NRHP: May 22, 1978
- Designated VLR: November 15, 1977

Stover House, also known as Fort Stover, is a historic home located near Luray, Page County, Virginia. It is dated to the late-18th century, and is a two-story, three-bay, rubble stone structure with a traditional Flurküchenhaus plan. It has a basement that projects its full height above grade on the river side. Located off the basement is a vaulted room. It is considered among the best preserved and least altered of the important group of 18th-century log and stone German houses of the Massanutten Settlement.

It was listed on the National Register of Historic Places in 1978.
