= Ruffner House =

Historic house in Virginia, United States

- U.S. National Register of Historic Places
- Virginia Landmarks Register
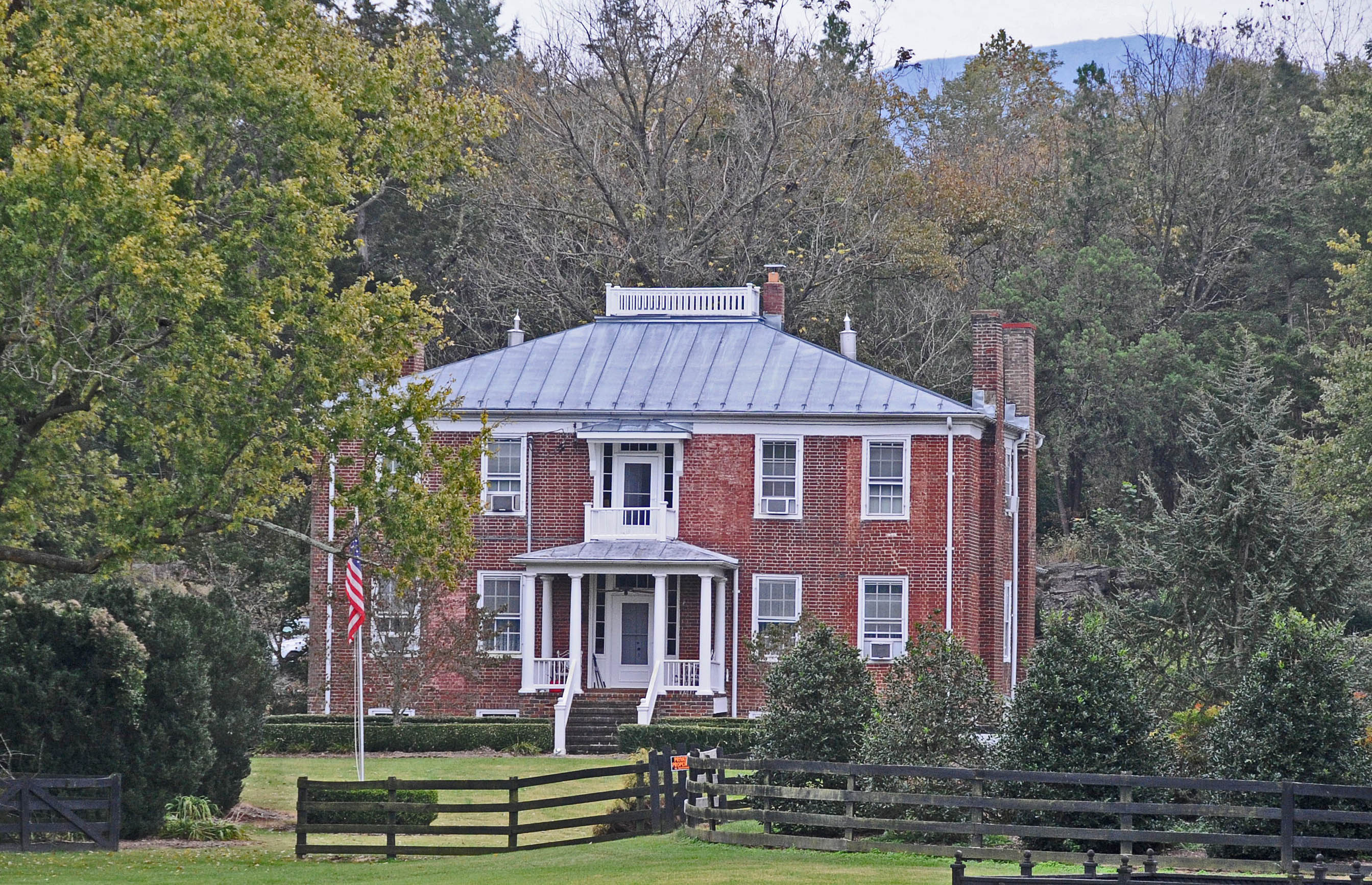

- Location within Virginia Location within the United States
- Location: 440 Ruffner House Ln., Luray, Virginia
- Coordinates: 38°40′14″N 78°27′18″W
- Area: 21.3 acres (8.6 ha)
- Built: c. 1825, c. 1851, c. 1920s
- Architectural style: Federal, Greek Revival, et al.
- NRHP reference No.: 01001515
- VLR No.: 159-5025

Significant dates
- Added to NRHP: January 24, 2002
- Designated VLR: June 13, 2001

The Ruffner House, also known as Luray Tannery Farm, is a historic home and farm complex located at Luray, Page County, Virginia. It was built in two phases, about 1825 and about 1851. It is a two-story, Federal / Greek Revival style brick dwelling with a hipped with deck roof, a stone foundation, and one-story porches on the two fronts. The house was remodeled in the 1920s. Also on the property are the contributing rambling two-story frame residence known as The Cottage; a stone spring house with attached brick pumphouse that served an adjacent tannery; schoolhouse and shop; root cellar; secondary barn; dairy; machinery shed; chicken house; a swimming pool; an 1890s bank barn, and the small Ruffner Cemetery.

It was listed on the National Register of Historic Places in 2002.
