= Peter Bouck Borst =

American politician

- Born: June 23, 1826; Schoharie County, New York, US
- Died: April 25, 1882; Luray, Virginia, US
- Spouse: Isabella C. Almond
- Children: 3
- Parent(s): Peter I. Borst and Catherine B. Borst

Peter Bouck Borst (23 June 1826 – 25 April 1882) was an active participant in the mid-19th century development of Page County, Virginia, serving as a lawyer, county delegate to Virginia's Secession Convention of 1861, and president of the Shenandoah Valley Railroad.

== Early life ==
Borst was born and raised in Schoharie County, New York, the second son of U.S. Congressman Peter I. Borst and Catherine B. Borst.

In 1847, he relocated from New York to Luray, Virginia, where he opened practice as a lawyer. Within a few years of his arrival, he met Isabella C. Almond, marrying her on 1 April 1851. Almond was a daughter of Edmund "Mann" Almond, a prominent Luray merchant and slaveholder (owning seven slaves in 1850, and five slaves in 1860).

Soon after the arrival of the couple's son, Charles Manning, in 1851, Borst began construction on a new family home, "Aventine Hall", on a high point on the west end of Luray and within sight of the county court house. Borst had designed the house when he was 20, without consulting with any architects. Aventine Hall was listed on the National Register of Historic Places in 1970.

== Early career ==
In 1852, Borst began a long career as Commonwealth's Attorney for Page County, maintaining his office in the North wing of the courthouse. By 1860, he had accumulated considerable property and popularity in the county. He owned a farm by the mid-1850s and later built a three-story tannery that would be known as "one of the most flourishing establishments in the county" in antebellum Luray.

== Secession Convention ==
Borst was selected as Page County's delegate to the Virginia Convention of 1861 and was one of only four convention delegates (along with Raphael Morgan Conn and Samuel Croudson Williams of Shenandoah County, and Robert H. Turner of Warren County), from among the eighteen delegates from the Shenandoah Valley, to side with secession in the April 4 vote. At that time, sentiments in the Shenandoah Valley were much more Unionist than pro-secession. When he voted again in favor of secession on April 17, he was among the majority vote of the Shenandoah Valley delegates, only two (Edmund Pendleton of Berkeley County and John Francis Lewis of Rockingham County) voting against. In the proceedings, Borst was quoted as seeing his adopted county as "fully alive to the crisis, and prepared to meet it, come what may."

== Civil War years ==
Since Peter Borst stood out as a delegate of Virginia's secession convention, his home at "Aventine" would be earmarked as a building of interest by Union soldiers during multiple occupations of Luray during the war. The home was regularly occupied and used as a field hospital. Additionally, his tannery operations, providing a variety of leather goods in support of the Confederacy, would be burned twice, first on 22 December 1863. Though Borst attempted to rebuild his operation, the tannery was burned again during the October 1864 occupation.

Having also relocated to Page County prior to the war, two of Borst's siblings, John B. and Addison A. Borst, served in the local "Page Volunteers" of Company K, 10th Virginia Infantry. Addison served as a corporal and was captured 12 May 1864 at Spotsylvania Court House. After spending several months at the POW camp at Point Lookout, Maryland, he was exchanged in October 1864. John B. Borst served initially as 1st sergeant of the company and later quartermaster sergeant of the regiment. Both brothers survived the war.

== Post-Civil War ==
Following the war, Borst again secured his place as Commonwealth's Attorney until 1870, when, due to the military appointment of another judge, Borst was without office for one year. He resumed the post again in 1871.

Perhaps the most significant contribution made by Borst to the county was his efforts to bring the railroad into the county. As a projector of the Shenandoah Valley Railroad, he was successful in seeing that hope to fruition. Borst became the first president of the railroad in 1870 and, by 1881, trains were running through the county.

In the midst of dealing with legal matters on Monday, 25 April 1882, Borst "suddenly and noiselessly" fell back in his chair, dead of apoplexy. He was laid to rest in Green Hill Cemetery in Luray, Virginia.
