= Luray, Virginia =

Town in the Shenandoah Valley in Virginia, United States

- Town
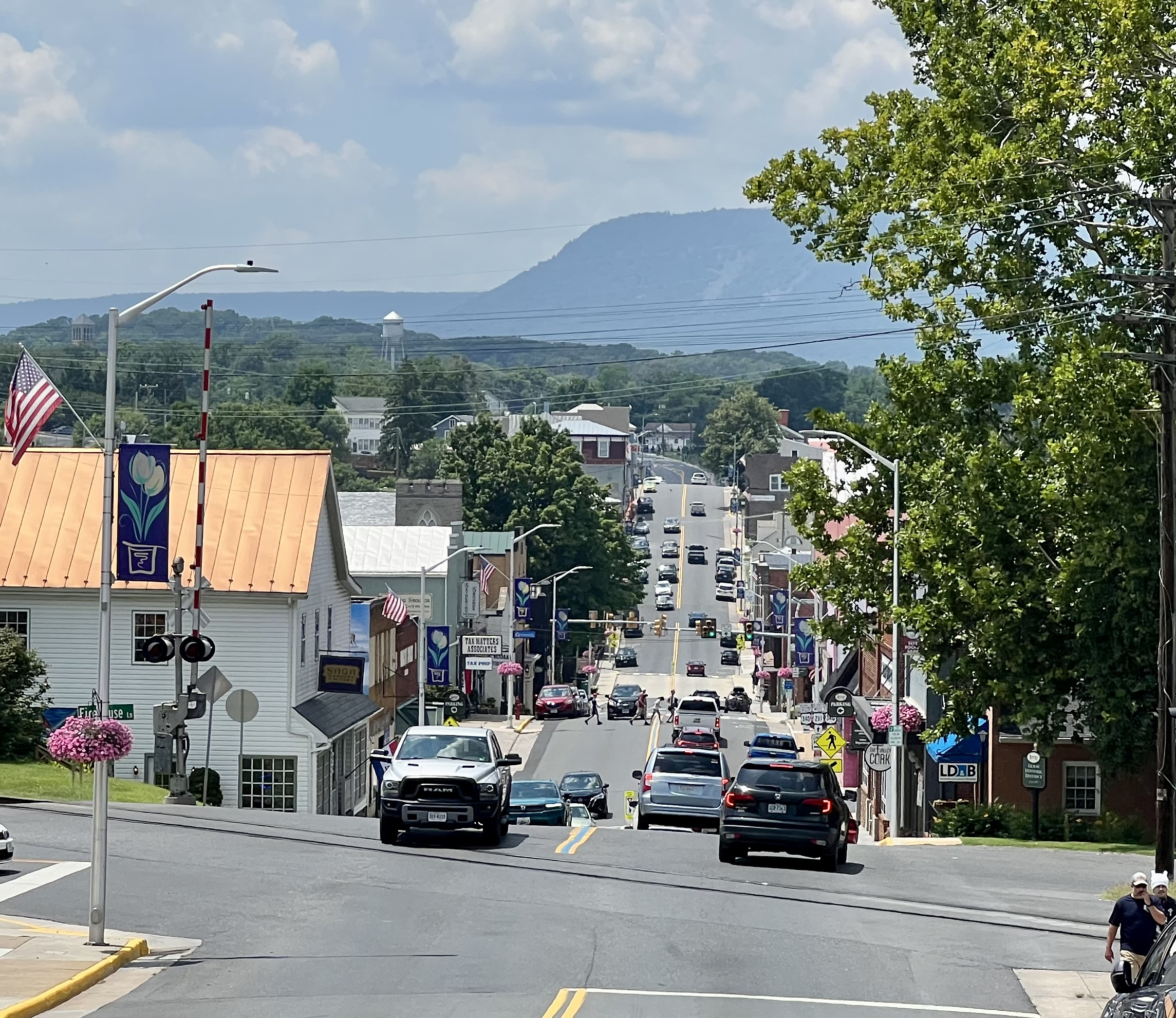
- Downtown Luray in July 2025

- Location of Luray within Page County

- Location within Virginia Location within the United States
- Coordinates: 38°39′48″N 78°28′55″W
- Country: United States
- State: Virginia
- County: Page
- Established: February 6, 1812
- Named for: Luray, France

Government
  - Type: Council-manager government
  - Mayor: Stephanie Lillard (I)

Area
  - Total: 4.86 sq mi (12.58 km^{2})
  - Land: 4.83 sq mi (12.50 km^{2})
  - Water: 0.031 sq mi (0.08 km^{2})
- Elevation: 863 ft (263 m)

Population (2020)
  - Total: 4,831
  - Density: 1,004.2/sq mi (387.72/km^{2})
- Time zone: UTC-5 (Eastern (EST))
  - Summer (DST): UTC-4 (EDT)
- ZIP code: 22835
- Area code: 540
- FIPS code: 51-47528
- GNIS feature ID: 2391279
- Website: www.townofluray.com

Luray is the county seat of Page County, Virginia, United States. It is in the Shenandoah Valley and found within the northwestern part of the Commonwealth. The population was 4,831 at the 2020 census.

The town was founded by William Staige Marye in 1812, a descendant of a family native to Luray, France.

== Geography ==
According to the United States Census Bureau, the town has a total area of 4.8 square miles (12 km^{2}), of which 4.7 square miles (12.3 km^{2}) is land and 0.21% is water.

=== Climate ===
The climate in this area is characterized by hot, humid summers and cool winters. According to the Köppen climate classification system, Luray has a humid subtropical climate (Cfa).

Climate data for Luray 5 E, Virginia (1991–2020 normals, extremes 1941–present)
| Month | Jan | Feb | Mar | Apr | May | Jun | Jul | Aug | Sep | Oct | Nov | Dec | Year |
|---|---|---|---|---|---|---|---|---|---|---|---|---|---|
| Record high °F (°C) | 80 (27) | 80 (27) | 90 (32) | 94 (34) | 97 (36) | 100 (38) | 105 (41) | 101 (38) | 102 (39) | 97 (36) | 85 (29) | 79 (26) | 105 (41) |
| Mean maximum °F (°C) | 65.6 (18.7) | 68.2 (20.1) | 76.7 (24.8) | 85.8 (29.9) | 89.5 (31.9) | 93.0 (33.9) | 95.1 (35.1) | 93.3 (34.1) | 90.6 (32.6) | 83.9 (28.8) | 76.0 (24.4) | 67.6 (19.8) | 96.1 (35.6) |
| Mean daily maximum °F (°C) | 43.3 (6.3) | 47.4 (8.6) | 54.9 (12.7) | 66.5 (19.2) | 74.0 (23.3) | 81.4 (27.4) | 85.4 (29.7) | 83.4 (28.6) | 77.9 (25.5) | 67.4 (19.7) | 56.7 (13.7) | 47.2 (8.4) | 65.5 (18.6) |
| Daily mean °F (°C) | 33.1 (0.6) | 36.5 (2.5) | 43.2 (6.2) | 53.8 (12.1) | 62.0 (16.7) | 69.7 (20.9) | 73.7 (23.2) | 72.1 (22.3) | 66.1 (18.9) | 55.4 (13.0) | 45.3 (7.4) | 37.4 (3.0) | 54.0 (12.2) |
| Mean daily minimum °F (°C) | 23.0 (−5.0) | 25.6 (−3.6) | 31.5 (−0.3) | 41.0 (5.0) | 50.1 (10.1) | 57.9 (14.4) | 62.0 (16.7) | 60.9 (16.1) | 54.3 (12.4) | 43.4 (6.3) | 34.0 (1.1) | 27.6 (−2.4) | 42.6 (5.9) |
| Mean minimum °F (°C) | 3.6 (−15.8) | 7.0 (−13.9) | 13.2 (−10.4) | 25.9 (−3.4) | 34.1 (1.2) | 44.7 (7.1) | 51.5 (10.8) | 50.7 (10.4) | 40.7 (4.8) | 28.0 (−2.2) | 18.7 (−7.4) | 11.4 (−11.4) | 1.3 (−17.1) |
| Record low °F (°C) | −10 (−23) | −14 (−26) | −2 (−19) | 15 (−9) | 23 (−5) | 31 (−1) | 34 (1) | 37 (3) | 28 (−2) | 17 (−8) | 6 (−14) | −7 (−22) | −14 (−26) |
| Average precipitation inches (mm) | 2.85 (72) | 2.45 (62) | 3.58 (91) | 3.51 (89) | 4.21 (107) | 4.76 (121) | 4.12 (105) | 3.77 (96) | 5.42 (138) | 3.17 (81) | 3.21 (82) | 3.10 (79) | 44.15 (1,121) |
| Average snowfall inches (cm) | 6.1 (15) | 2.7 (6.9) | 6.2 (16) | 0.1 (0.25) | 0.0 (0.0) | 0.0 (0.0) | 0.0 (0.0) | 0.0 (0.0) | 0.0 (0.0) | 0.1 (0.25) | 0.4 (1.0) | 3.0 (7.6) | 18.6 (47) |
| Average precipitation days (≥ 0.01 in) | 9.5 | 7.8 | 11.2 | 12.0 | 12.4 | 11.1 | 11.1 | 10.5 | 9.7 | 8.7 | 8.9 | 9.6 | 122.5 |
| Average snowy days (≥ 0.1 in) | 1.7 | 1.6 | 1.1 | 0.1 | 0.0 | 0.0 | 0.0 | 0.0 | 0.0 | 0.1 | 0.2 | 0.9 | 5.7 |
Source: NOAA

== Demographics ==
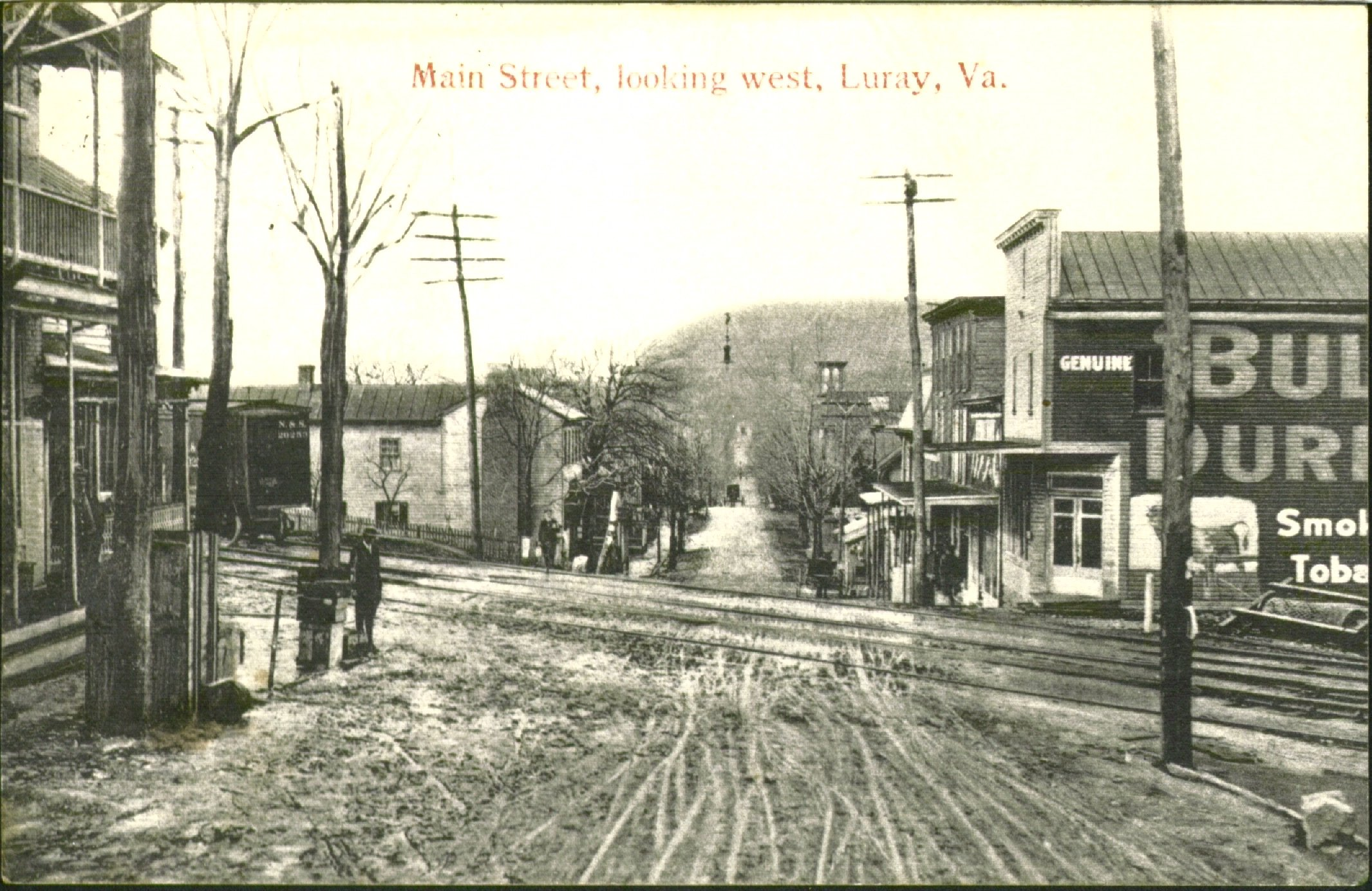
Main Street, Luray in 1910

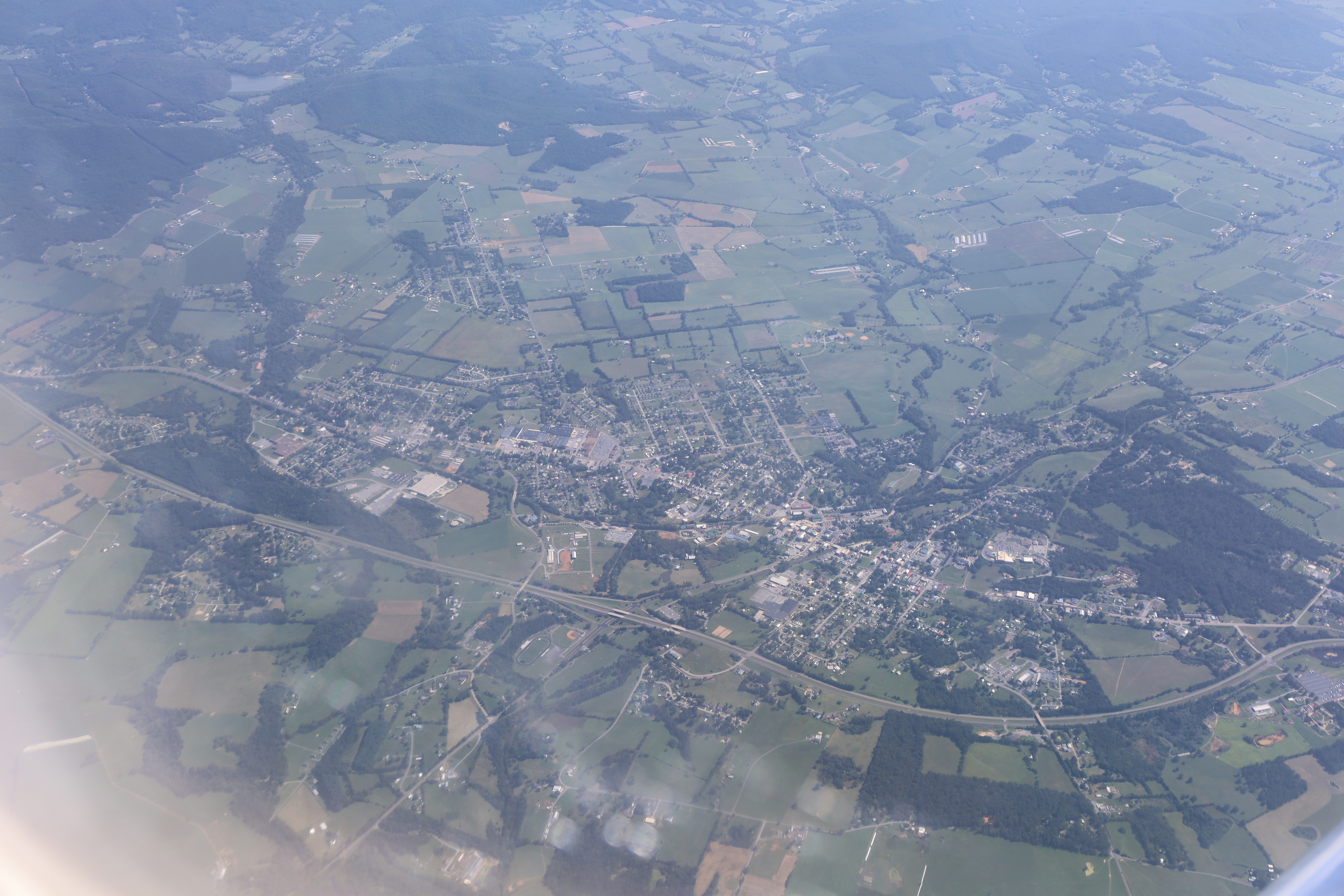
Aerial view in 2021

Historical population
| Census | Pop. | Note | %± |
|---|---|---|---|
| 1880 | 632 | | — |
| 1890 | 1,386 | | 119.3% |
| 1900 | 1,147 | | −17.2% |
| 1910 | 1,218 | | 6.2% |
| 1920 | 1,381 | | 13.4% |
| 1930 | 1,459 | | 5.6% |
| 1940 | 1,511 | | 3.6% |
| 1950 | 2,731 | | 80.7% |
| 1960 | 3,014 | | 10.4% |
| 1970 | 3,612 | | 19.8% |
| 1980 | 3,584 | | −0.8% |
| 1990 | 4,587 | | 28.0% |
| 2000 | 4,871 | | 6.2% |
| 2010 | 4,895 | | 0.5% |
| 2020 | 4,831 | | −1.3% |
U.S. Decennial Census

=== 2020 census ===
As of the 2020 census, Luray had a population of 4,831. The median age was 47.9 years. 17.9% of residents were under the age of 18 and 25.2% of residents were 65 years of age or older. For every 100 females there were 92.2 males, and for every 100 females age 18 and over there were 91.0 males age 18 and over.

97.6% of residents lived in urban areas, while 2.4% lived in rural areas.

There were 2,076 households in Luray, of which 25.4% had children under the age of 18 living in them. Of all households, 39.3% were married-couple households, 19.2% were households with a male householder and no spouse or partner present, and 33.8% were households with a female householder and no spouse or partner present. About 34.4% of all households were made up of individuals and 18.6% had someone living alone who was 65 years of age or older.

There were 2,269 housing units, of which 8.5% were vacant. The homeowner vacancy rate was 1.8% and the rental vacancy rate was 4.9%.

Racial composition as of the 2020 census
| Race | Number | Percent |
|---|---|---|
| White | 4,213 | 87.2% |
| Black or African American | 260 | 5.4% |
| American Indian and Alaska Native | 12 | 0.2% |
| Asian | 52 | 1.1% |
| Native Hawaiian and Other Pacific Islander | 4 | 0.1% |
| Some other race | 17 | 0.4% |
| Two or more races | 273 | 5.7% |
| Hispanic or Latino (of any race) | 120 | 2.5% |

=== 2000 census ===
As of the census of 2000, there were 4,871 people, 2,037 households, and 1,332 families residing in the town. The population density was 1,026.8 people per square mile (396.4 people/km^{2}). There were 2,191 housing units at an average density of 461.9 units per square mile (178.3 units/km^{2}). The racial makeup of the town was 92.45% White, 5.52% African American, 0.25% Native American, 0.33% Asian, 0.45% from other races, and 1.01% from two or more races. Hispanic or Latino of any race were 1.35% of the population.

There were 2,037 households, out of which 27.9% had children under the age of 28 living with them, 47.8% were married couples living together, 13.5% had a female householder with no husband present, and 34.6% were non-families. 30.7% of all households were made up of individuals, and 15.7% had someone living alone who was 65 years of age or older. The average household size was 2.31 and the average family size was 2.85.

In the town, the population was spread out, with 22.1% under the age of 18, 6.7% from 18 to 24, 27.0% from 25 to 44, 23.0% from 45 to 64, and 21.3% who were 65 years of age or older. The median age was 41 years. For every 100 females there were 87.2 males. For every 100 females age 18 and over, there were 82.3 males.

The median income for a household in the town was $34,306, and the median income for a family was $39,972. Males had a median income of $30,039 versus $19,841 for females. The per capita income for the town was $16,205. About 11.3% of families and 13.1% of the population were below the poverty line, including 22.4% of those under age 18 and 9.6% of those age 65 or over.

== Notable features ==
One of the dominant hills in the Town of Luray is the location of the Grand Old Mimslyn Inn, a 1931 classic Southern mansion style hotel. The hotel is a popular site for wedding receptions. First Lady Eleanor Roosevelt visited the Mimslyn during a short visit in the late 1930s and former Virginia Governor Mark Warner visited in January 2008. The site of the Mimslyn is on the former location of "Aventine Hall," the home of Peter Bouck Borst, a mid-19th century lawyer. Aventine was carefully removed to make way for the construction of the Mimslyn in the 1930s. "Aventine Hall" is now located on South Court Street (this is a private residence) in the Town of Luray, Virginia.

The Luray Singing Tower, officially known as the Belle Brown Northcott Memorial, was erected in 1937 in memory of Colonel Theodore Clay Northcott's wife (Northcott was the owner of the Luray Caverns). At 117 feet (36 m) high the Luray Singing Tower contains a carillon of 47 bells from John Taylor & Co of Loughborough, Leicestershire, Great Britain. The largest bell weighs 7,640 pounds and is six feet in diameter. The smallest weighs a mere 12½ pounds. Recognized as one of the country's major carillons, regularly scheduled recitals are held, free of charge, through the spring, summer and fall. The carillon is situated in a park opposite Luray Caverns.

- Luray Caverns is located in the western part of Luray
- Luray is the nearest town to the Thornton Gap entrance to Skyline Drive (to the east), as well as serving as the headquarters for Shenandoah National Park
- Murder Mountain, located off Old Wagon Road in Luray, has become a destination for ghost hunters
- The Luray Downtown Historic District is a Virginia Main Street Community and a registered National Historic District
- Home to the 2010 Valley Baseball League Champion Luray Wranglers
- The only high school in Luray is Luray High School, home of the Bulldogs
- The town is also home to The Page News and Courier, the major newspaper for the county
- In 1893 the Blue Ridge Bank was founded, one of the oldest still functioning banks in Virginia
- The community's proximity to the South Fork of the Shenandoah River provides recreational opportunities connected with boating, white water rafting, and fishing as well as hunting in the fall
- Jeremey's Run Site is an archaeological site listed on the National Register of Historic Places
- In addition to the Luray Downtown Historic District, Aventine Hall, and archaeological sites, the Heiston-Strickler House, Kanawha, Luray Norfolk and Western Passenger Station, Massanutton Heights, Mount Calvary Lutheran Church, Page County Courthouse, Abram and Sallie Printz Farm, Redwell-Isabella Furnace Historic District, Ruffner House, Skyline Drive Historic District, Isaac Spitler House, Stover House, and Wall Brook Farm are listed on the National Register of Historic Places
- Actor Ben Jones, cast member of the TV series The Dukes of Hazzard, opened a museum just west of Luray called "Cooter's Place," named for Jones' character name in the series.

== Education ==
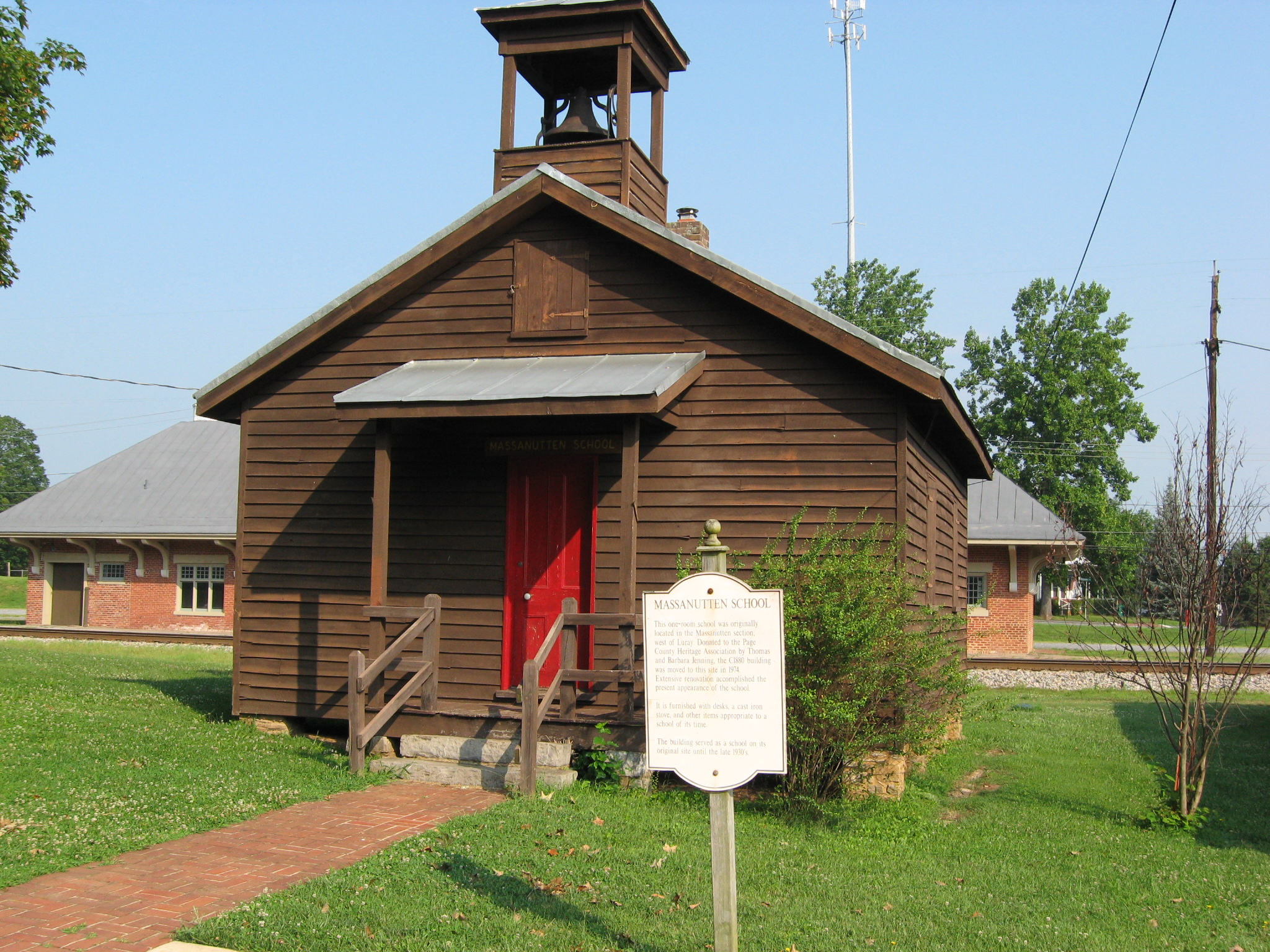
The Massanutten School, a restored one-room schoolhouse in downtown Luray

=== Public schools ===
Page County Public Schools serve Luray, as well as the rest of Page County. Luray Elementary, Luray Middle, and Luray High School serve the entire town and nearby surrounding areas. Luray Middle and High also serve northern Page County, from feeder elementary school, Springfield, located near Rileyville.

=== Private schools ===
Mount Carmel Christian Academy is just south of town limits and is a private Christian school.

=== Higher education ===
Laurel Ridge Community College (formerly Lord Fairfax Community College) has a campus in Luray which provides students with nearly all necessary classes needed to graduate from the institution. Many students that attend the Luray Center of Laurel Ridge are from Page, southern Shenandoah, and southern Warren Counties.

== Neighborhoods ==
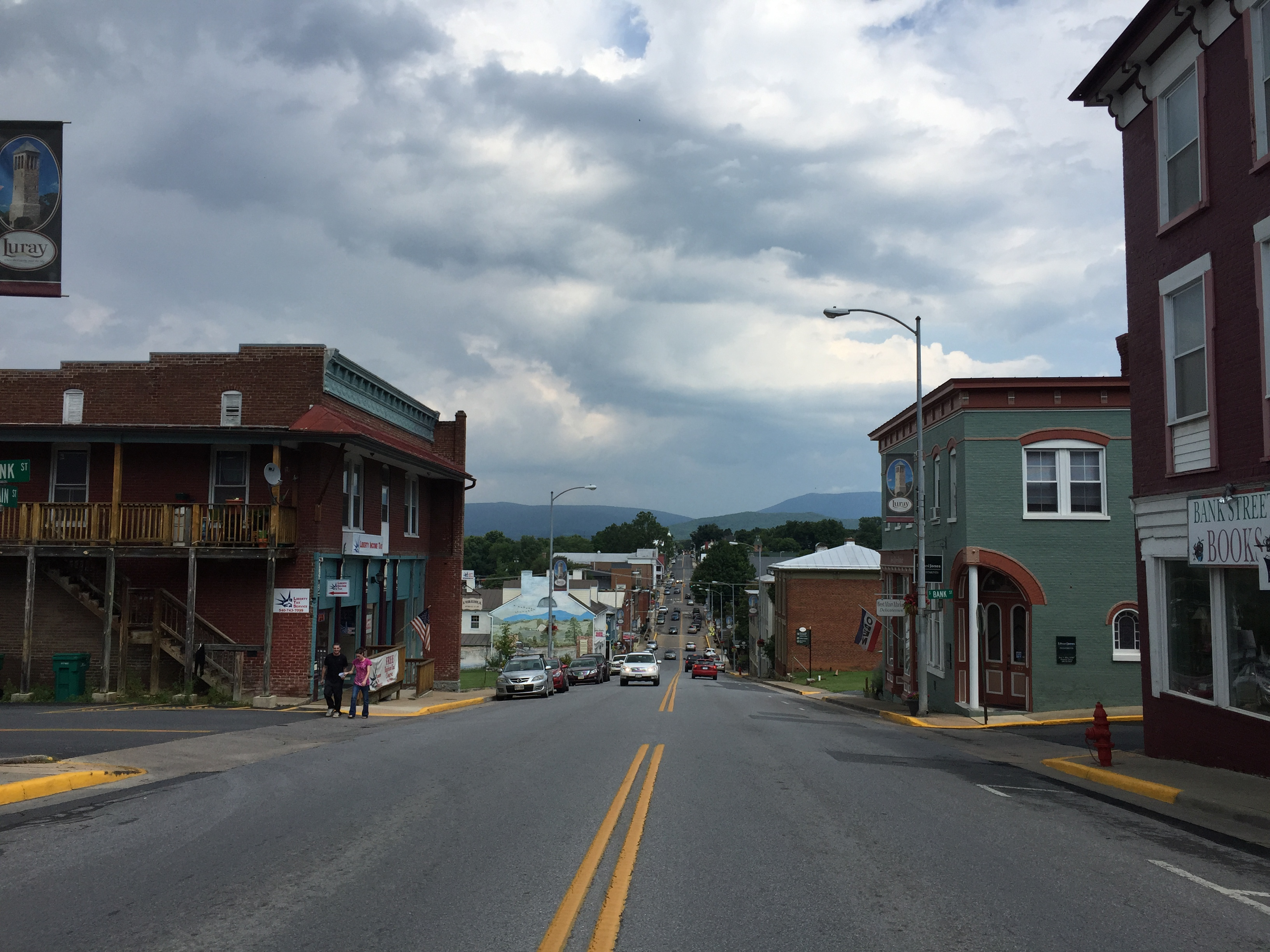
Main Street in Luray

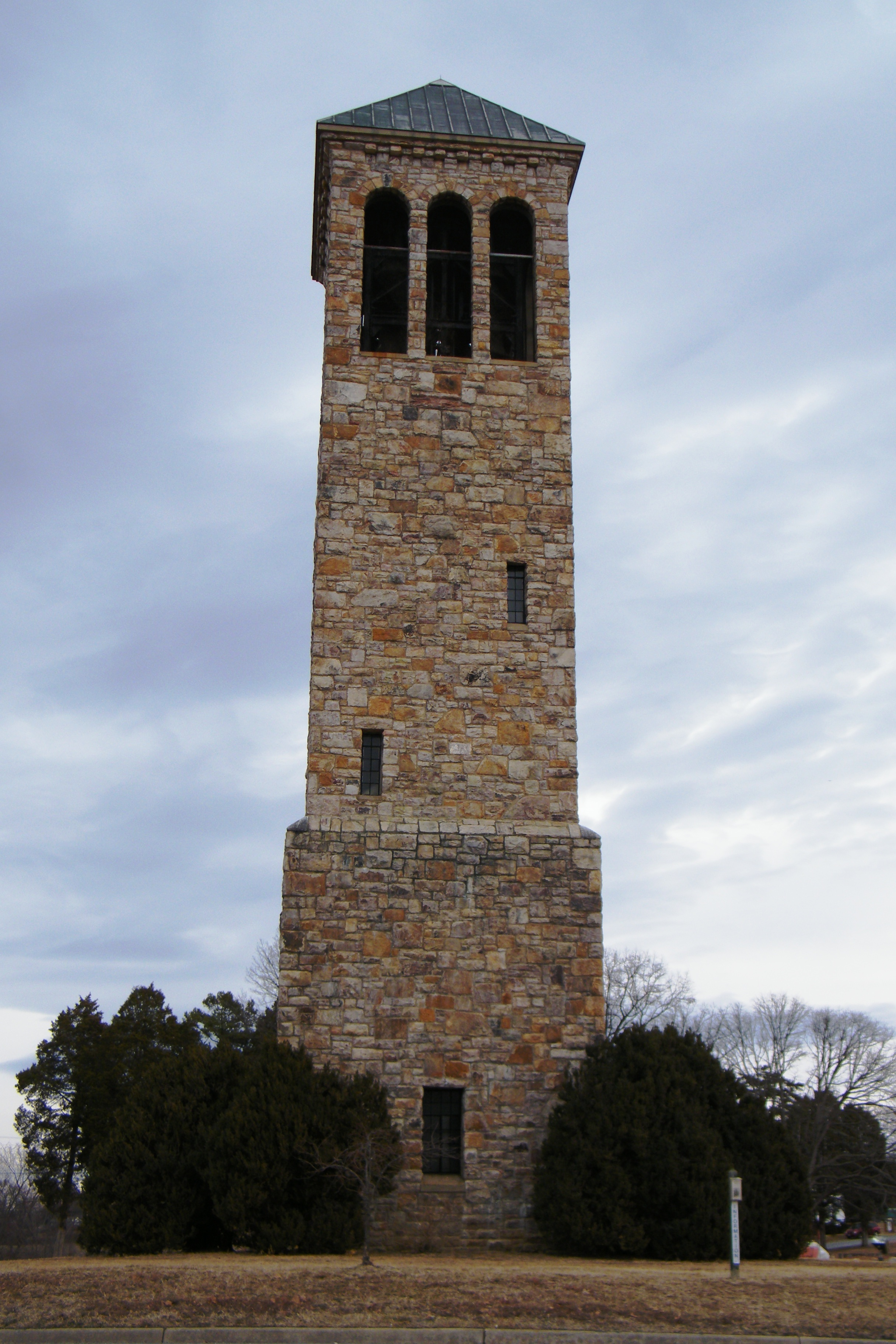
Belle Brown Northcott Memorial – also known as The Luray Singing Tower

Well over three quarters of the town's population lives in one of the several planned neighborhoods of Luray. Each neighborhood serves as a landmark to the residents of Luray, often citing their neighborhoods as their residence.

- Boomfield—Located along in the southeastern part of Luray, namely the numbered streets.
- Cedar Knolls—An affluent neighborhood, located above Hilldale, but not a part of it.
- Court Street—A neighborhood of houses and streets branching off of Court Street and South Court Street Extended.
- Downtown—The downtown district along Main Street.
- Fairview—Far eastern portions of Luray, from East Luray Shopping Center eastward toward Fairview Grocery and the town line.
- Forest Hills—An affluent neighborhood located in the southwestern portion of the town. The roads within the neighborhood have medians with trees planted in them.
- Golf Course/Oh Shenandoah!—An affluent neighborhood located along the Luray Caverns Country Club golf course. Homes are often overly extravagant and some are not lived in full-time.
- Hawksbill Heights—A neighborhood above the Hawksbill Creek, very near Luray Middle School.
- Hilldale—An affluent neighborhood in the east-central portion of the town.
- Husdon—The subdivision between Forest Hills and the Hawksbill Creek in the southwestern portion of the town.
- Old Farms—A subdivision just outside the town limits, yet still referred to as within town limits.
- Springview—A neighborhood in the far northeastern reaches of the town limits, just across Route 211 from Old Farms. The roads within the neighborhood have medians with trees planted in them.
- West Lu—A housing development located in western Luray. It is near the Luray Airport and Luray Caverns.
- West Main Street / Bixler's Ferry-Known as "The Hill" to locals. It is the group of neighborhoods located between Downtown and Luray Caverns.
- Woodland Park—A neighborhood in the northernmost reaches of the town limits and includes both sides of Route 211. Named for the park that was once in the middle of the loop of Rosser Dr. and Stover St., which included a public pool. A small park remains. Across 211, there are duplexes as well as homes, and are considered to be in Woodland Park.

== History ==
The Town of Luray was officially established by act of the Virginia General Assembly on February 6, 1812, on ten acres of land near the Hawksbill Creek. On March 21, 1871, by act of General Assembly, the Town became an “Incorporated Town,” containing approximately 442 acres.

In 1781, Dirreck Pennypacker located the Redwell Furnace about a mile north of the current Town at Yager’s Spring. Here, Pennypacker operated a forge and a foundry making nails, farm tools, kettles, stoves, and other iron products. The iron works was later renamed the Isabella Furnace. More industry was located about a mile south of Luray at Willow Grove Mill. The small village known as Mundellsville contained a flour mill, carding mill, tannery and blacksmith shop. The economy of the Town would prosper from the nearness of the local industry.

On August 21, 1812, the Town of Luray was surveyed on the lands owned by Mr. Isaac Ruffner. The first streets platted were Main Street, due west of the Hawksbill Creek, to the top of the hill at present day Court Street. Court Street was called Peter Street in memory of Peter Ruffner, an early pioneer in the area. Three blocks of three lots each on either side of Peter Street were laid out. Three cross streets were mapped out due north and south, going west from Hawksbill Creek. These were Water Street (now Hawksbill Street), High Street (now Bank Street) and West Street (now Court Street). The first house was built here in 1814. The lots were all the same size and contained about half an acre. In 1818, the Town was extended by adding 26 lots. The Town now had 44 lots and the eastern end was at Hudson’s alley near the railroad. These lots were conveyed to the purchasers by Isaac Ruffner on May 9, 1818.

About 1845, according to Howe’s History of Virginia, Luray contained several mercantile stores, two or three churches, and a population of about 500. A description of Luray, in 1867 indicates Luray still had a population of 500. During the 1880’s the population of Luray more than doubled, from 630 in 1880 to 1,386 in 1890. The Town continued to grow in size from its original 442 acres that was established by the Town Charter in 1871.

In 1941, the first annexation occurred when 289 acres were added to the Town for a total of 835 acres. Ten years later, 284 acres were annexed for a total of 1,365 acres. In 1963, the Town added 410 acres for a total of 1,775 acres. The recent annexation effective since January 1, 1985, added an additional 1,220 acres for total of 2,995 acres.

In the late 18th and early 19th centuries, citizens living in the eastern portion of Shenandoah County – which is now Page County – traveled 35 to 40 miles to the Town of Woodstock, which served as Shenandoah’s county seat. During this era, a county seat served as an important location for conducting essential business such as recording deeds, paying property taxes, and settling disputes in civil court. Therefore, the Town which served as the location of a county seat was usually the undisputed epicenter of civic life for a county and region. For the citizens who lived in the far eastern portions of Shenandoah County, traveling to Woodstock was not only far in distance, but it was an arduous trip as well. Often the trip entailed crossing a mountain pass and several streams. This inconvenience prompted the General Assembly to establish Page County in 1831 with Luray, due to its central location, becoming the logical place for this new county seat. The establishment of Luray as the county seat of the newly formed Page County ensured that the Town evolved into the center for civic, cultural, and economic life.

== Civil War ==
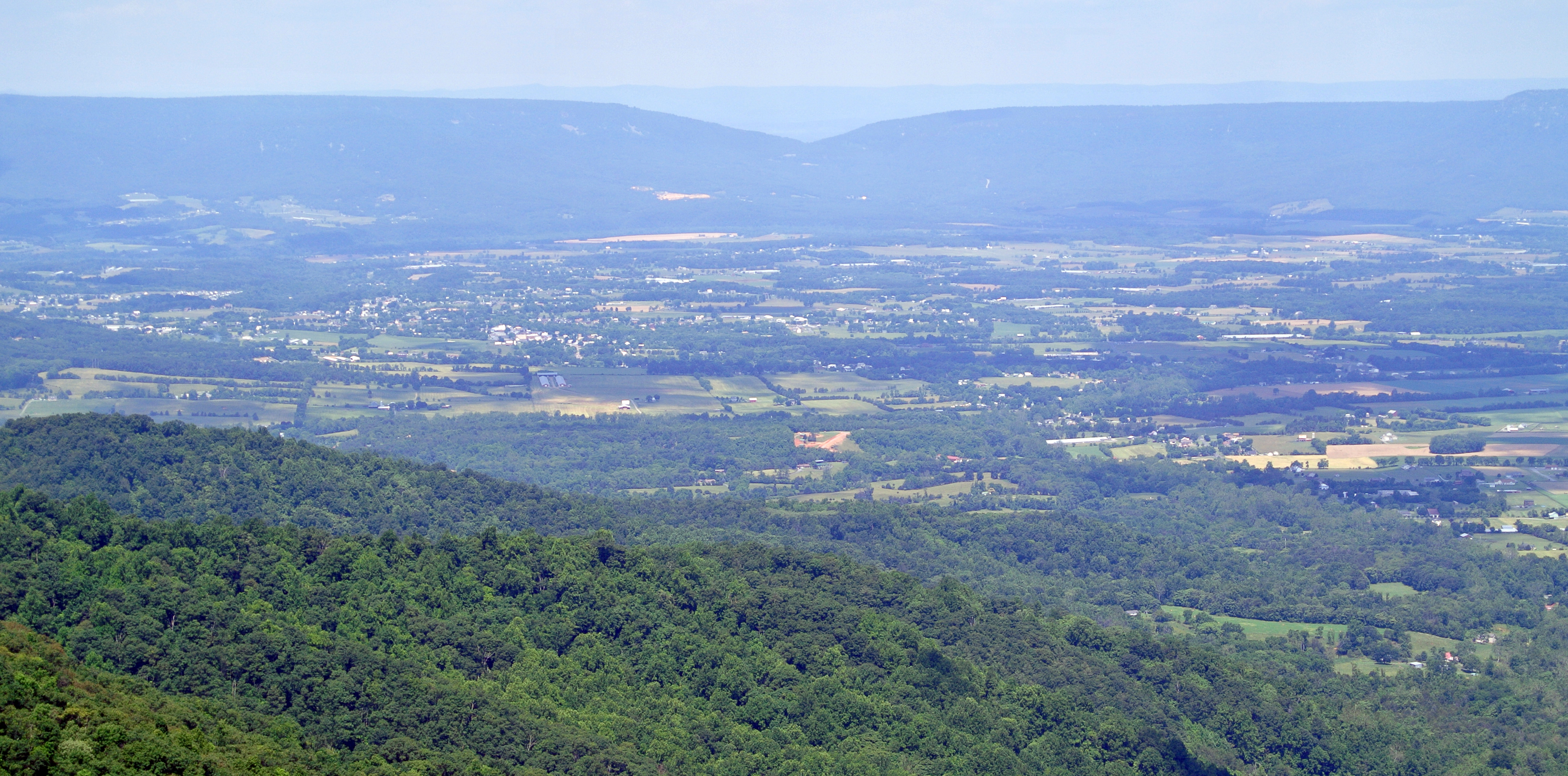
View westward of Luray and New Market Gap from Skyline Drive on the Blue Ridge

Luray is often cited as the location (as is Yager's Mill, on the north side of town, near Furnace Hill) of an engagement between Union and Confederate cavalry on September 24, 1864, though it actually took place approximately three miles north of the town, and even to the north of Yager's Mill.

Following his victory at the Battle of Fisher's Hill Union general Philip Sheridan sent approximately 6,000 troopers under Brigadier General Alfred Torbert into the Luray Valley. Torbert's men engaged approximately 1,200 Confederate cavalry under Brigadier General Williams Wickham. Despite victory in this affair and moving toward New Market Gap following the engagement, Torbert halted his command that night on the Page County side of the Massanutten, thereby missing an opportunity to cut off Confederate General Jubal Early's retreat from Fisher's Hill. Private Philip Baybutt of the 2nd Massachusetts Cavalry received the Medal of Honor for capturing a Confederate flag during the engagement. This action was part of Sheridan's portion of the Valley Campaigns of 1864.

Aunt Betty's Story: The Narrative of Bethany Veney, A Slave Woman (the book's cover reads merely "Aunt Betty's Story") is the 1889 autobiography of Bethany Veney's life in Luray.

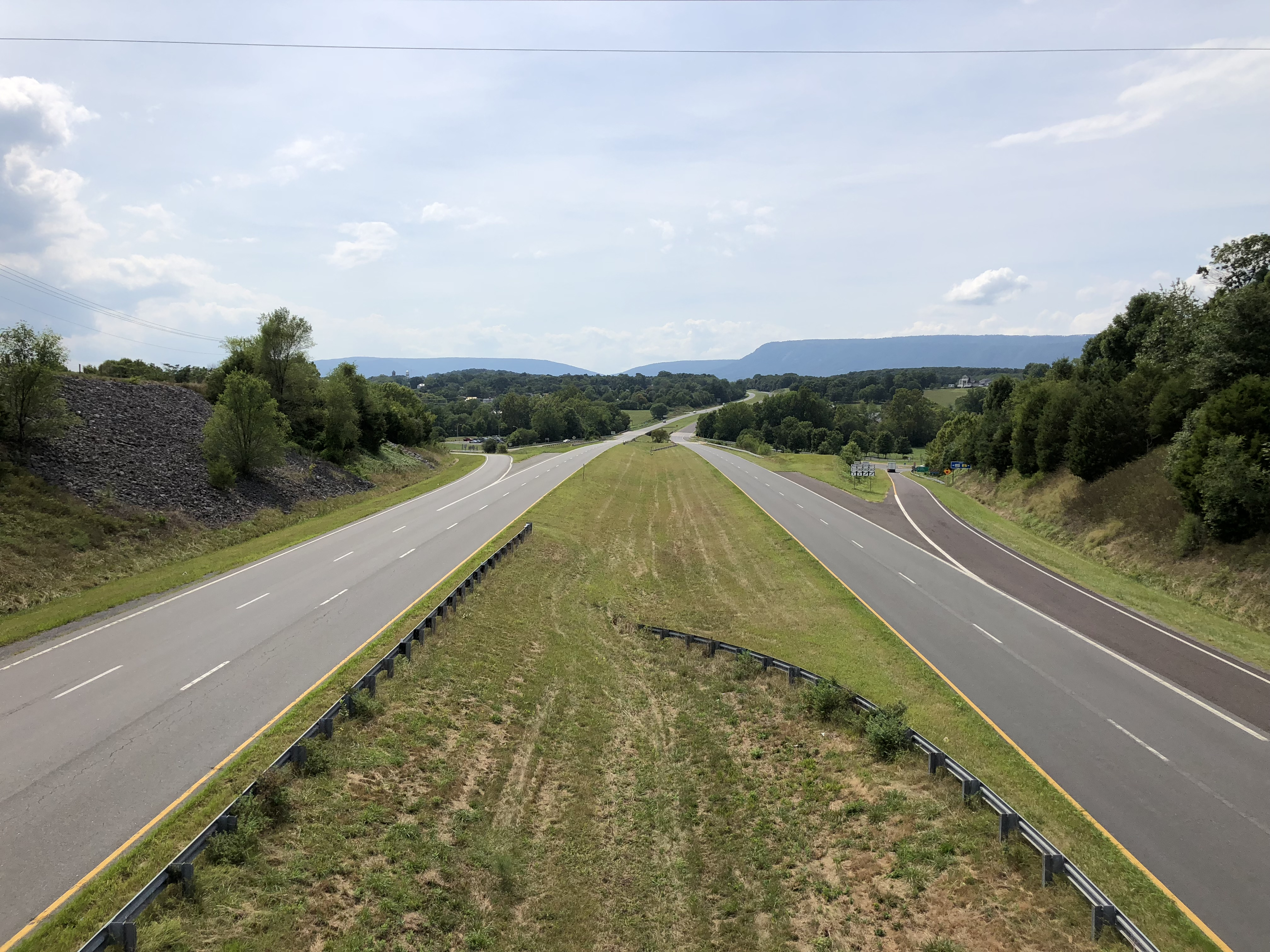
US 211 in Luray

== Transportation ==
US 211 and US 340 intersect in Luray and are the main roadways into and out of the area. US 211 Bus and US 340 Bus provide local access to downtown Luray. Main Street is U.S. 211 Business.

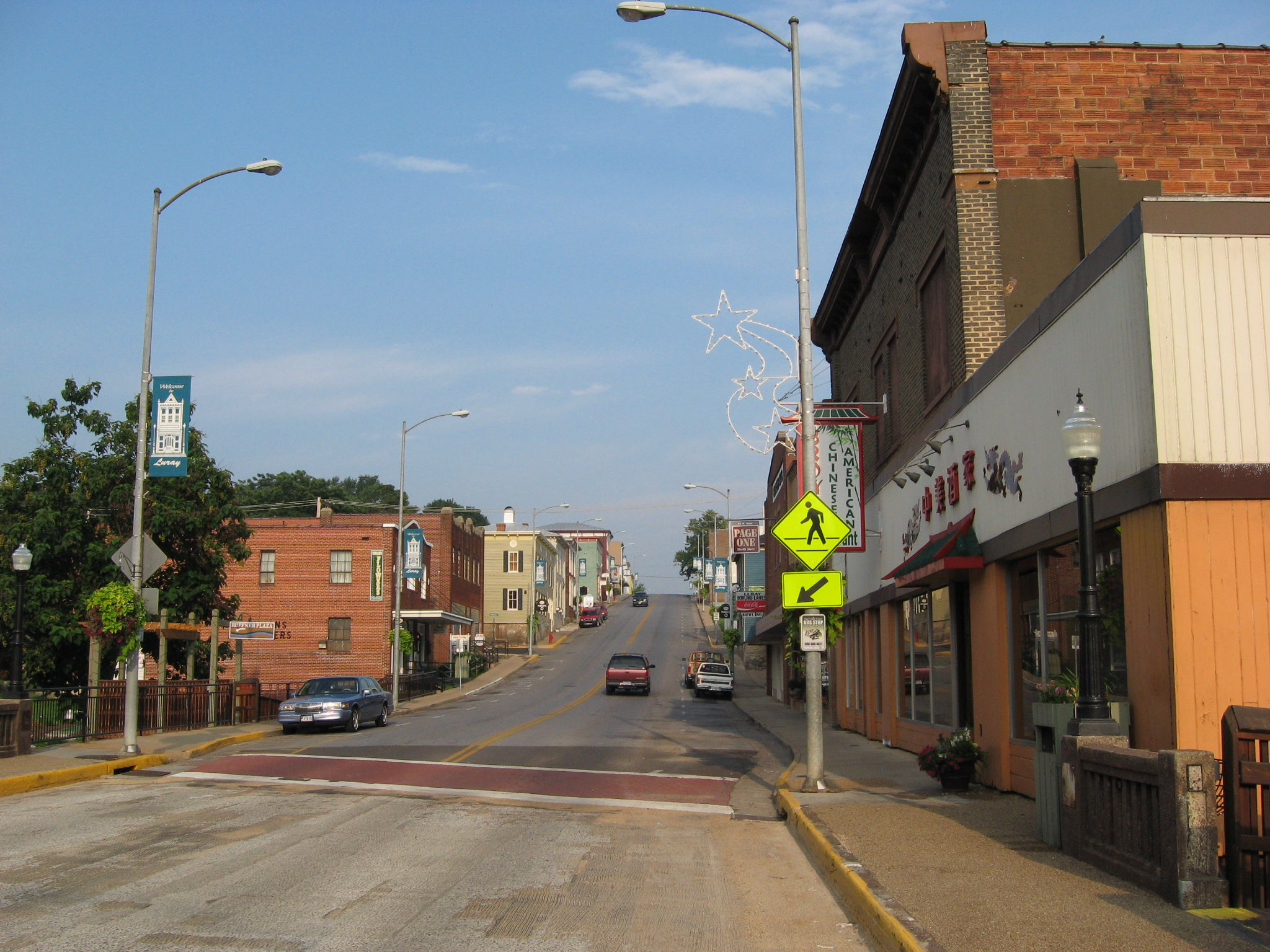
West Main Street in Downtown Luray on an early summer morning in 2008

== Notable people ==
- Edward Mallory "Ned" Almond (1892–1979), controversial United States Army general
- Floyd Baker (1916–2004), Major League Baseball infielder
- William Randolph Barbee (1818–1868), sculptor
- Andrew Russell Barbee, Jr. (1827–1903), brother of William Randolph Barbee, noted surgeon during the American Civil War
- Herbert Barbee (1848–1936), son of William Randolph Barbee, noted for his neoclassical sculpture
- Peter Bouck Borst (1826–1882), active participant in the mid-19th century development of Page County, Virginia
- Andrew Broaddus (died 1898), state delegate
- Charles Frederick Crisp (1845–1896), Congressman from Georgia from 1882 until his death
- Carolyn Ellis, academic known for her innovations in autoethnography
- Thomas Jordan (1819–1895), Confederate general
- Donald Edward Keyhoe (1897–1988), Marine Corps naval aviator
- Robert Franklin Leedy (1863–1924), lawyer, soldier, and Virginia state legislator
- Keith McHenry, co-founder of the global movement Food Not Bombs
- Mann Spitler (1825–1889), state politician
