= Heiston–Strickler House =

Historic house in Virginia, United States

- U.S. National Register of Historic Places
- Virginia Landmarks Register
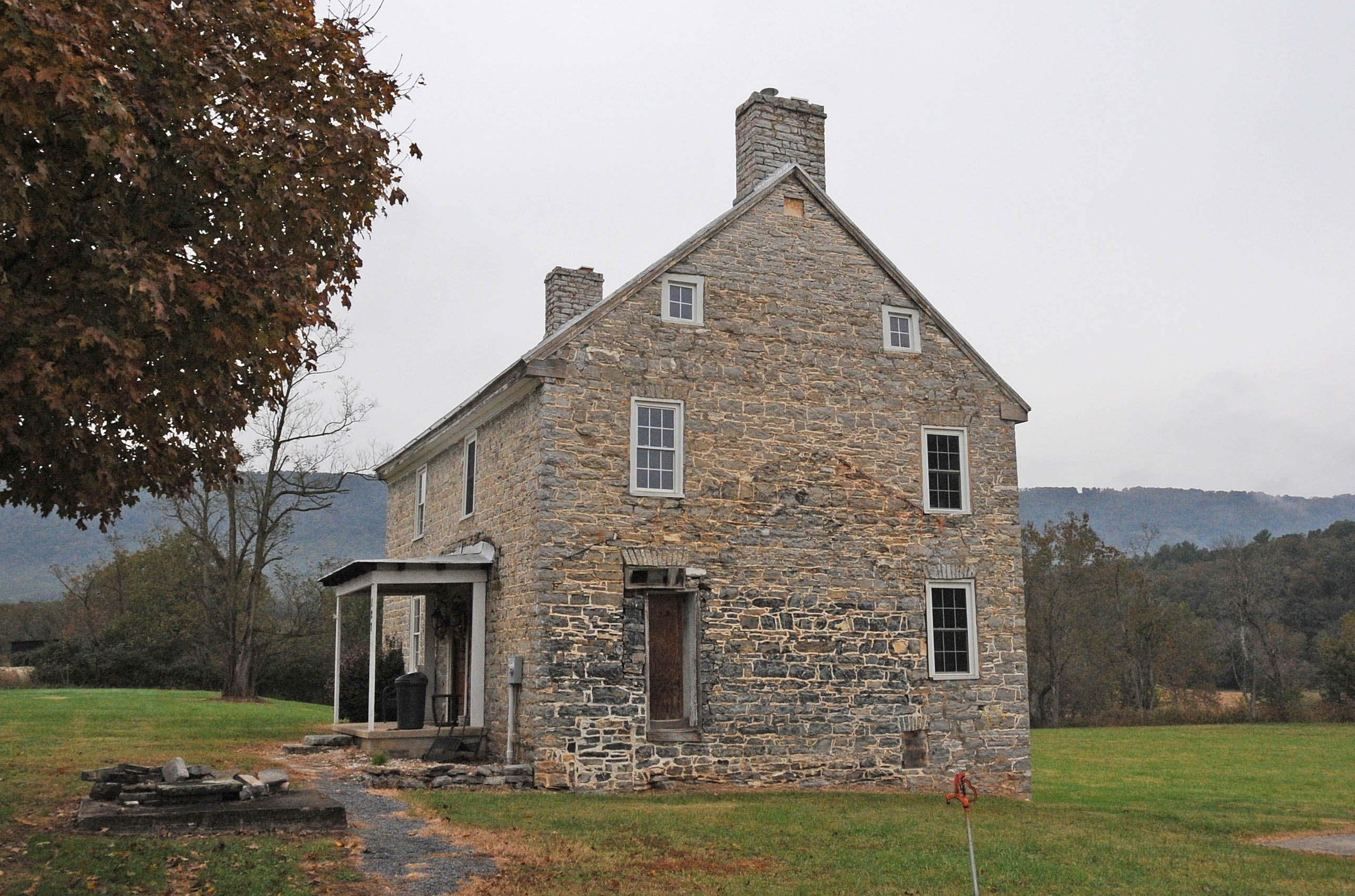

- Location within Virginia Location within the United States
- Location: NW of Luray off VA 75, near Luray, Virginia
- Coordinates: 38°42′0″N 78°29′49″W
- Area: 6 acres (2.4 ha)
- Built: 1790
- Architectural style: Continental
- NRHP reference No.: 78003037
- VLR No.: 069-0017

Significant dates
- Added to NRHP: November 16, 1978
- Designated VLR: April 18, 1978

Heiston–Strickler House, also known as the Old Stone House, is a historic home located near Luray, Page County, Virginia. It was built about 1790, and is a two-story, two-bay, stone dwelling with a gable roof. It has a one-story late-19th century frame wing. It is considered one of the most handsome and best preserved of the Page County Germanic houses.

It was listed on the National Register of Historic Places in 1978.
