= Westlu, Virginia =

Unincorporated community in Virginia, US

- Location of Luray within Page County, which is the county the majority of Westlu sits within

- Coordinates: 38°39′57″N 78°29′47″W

Westlu is an unincorporated community in Page County in the U.S. state of Virginia.
