= Aventine Hall =

Historic house in Virginia, United States

- U.S. National Register of Historic Places
- Virginia Landmarks Register
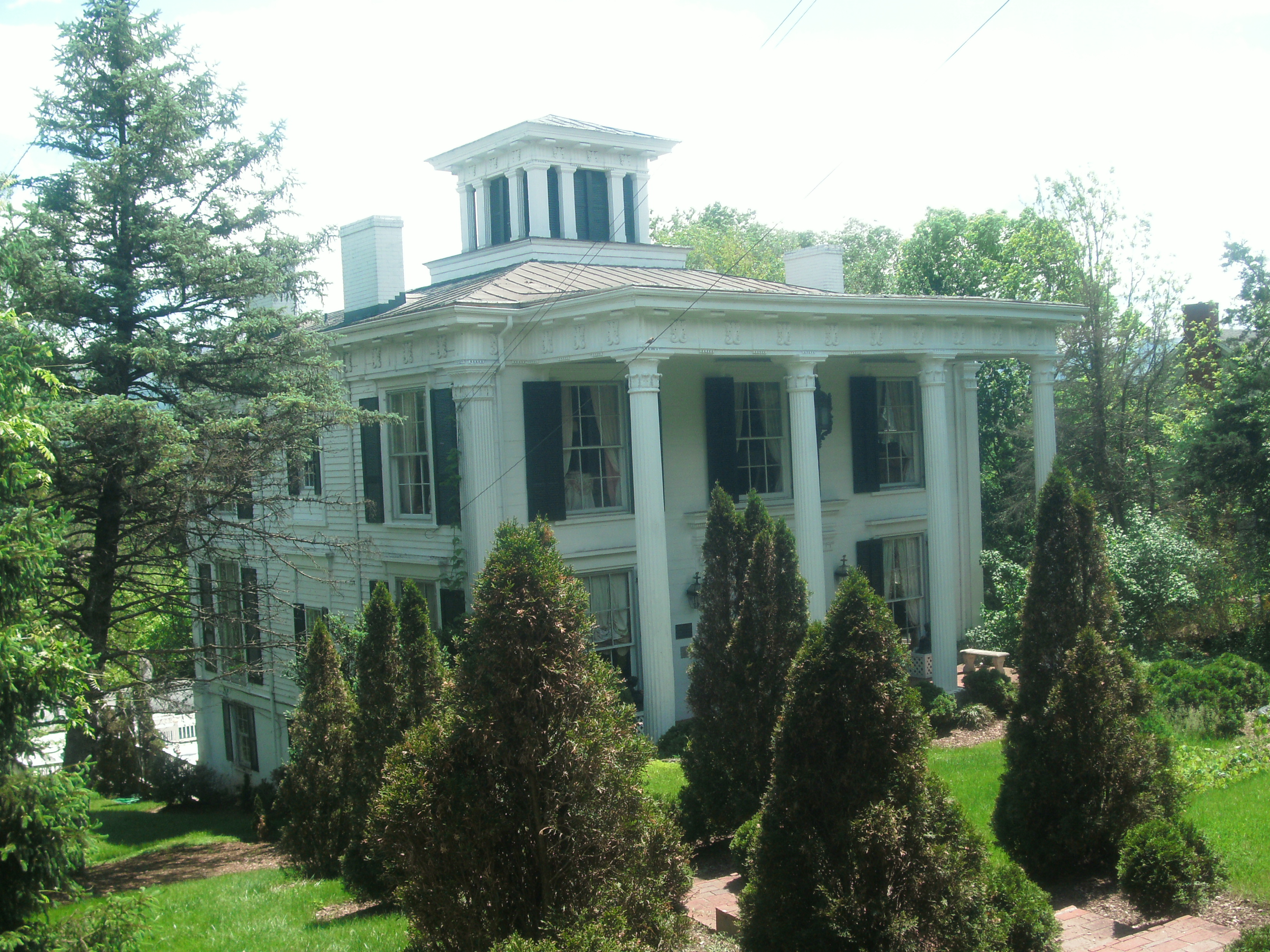
- Aventine Hall in May, 2016

- Location within Virginia Location within the United States
- Location: 143 S. Court St., Luray, Virginia
- Coordinates: 38°39′49″N 78°27′53″W
- Area: 0 acres (0 ha)
- Built: 1852
- Architects: Borst, Peter Bouck
- Architectural style: Greek Revival
- NRHP reference No.: 70000820
- VLR No.: 159-0001

Significant dates
- Added to NRHP: February 26, 1970
- Designated VLR: December 2, 1969

Aventine Hall is a historic home located at Luray, Page County, Virginia. It was built in 1852 by Peter Bouck Borst, and is a two-story, Greek Revival style frame dwelling. Its hipped roof is topped by a cupola and has four interior end chimneys. The facade features a tetrastyle portico, which runs almost the complete length of the facade. The portico is in the Corinthian order based on the Tower of the Winds in Athens. It has corner pilasters in the Tower of the Winds mode and a frieze and cornice that continue around the entire, almost square structure. Aventine Hall served as the main building of Luray College which operated from 1925 to 1927. It was moved to its present location in 1937.

It was listed on the National Register of Historic Places in 1970.
