= List of former primary state highways in Virginia (Staunton District) =

The following is a list of former primary state highways completely or mostly within the Staunton District (VDOT District 8) of the U.S. state of Virginia.

== SR 59 ==
State Route 59
- Location: West Virginia-Woodstock-east
- Existed: 1918–1949

State Route 59 connected West Virginia Route 59 to Woodstock, continuing east about 5 miles (8.0 km) to near Mine Mountain Road in the George Washington National Forest, across Woodstock Gap from Fort Valley. The route is now unpaved SR 691 from the West Virginia state line to Liberty Furnace, then SR 717 and SR 675 to Columbia Furnace, SR 623 and SR 768 (old alignment of SR 42) at Columbia Furnace, SR 42 to Woodstock, and Court Street and SR 758 to the east end.

The portion west of Woodstock was State Route 15 in the original 1918 system defined by the state legislature. It became State Route 331 (a spur of SR 33) in the 1923 renumbering, State Route 824 in the 1928 renumbering, and State Route 261 in the 1933 renumbering. The extension east from Woodstock was added in 1930, defined as 6.26 miles (10.07 km) in the direction of Fort Valley, but only extending about 5 miles (8.0 km) by the mid-1930s.

SR 261 became SR 59 in the 1940 renumbering to match West Virginia. Two years later, the section east of Woodstock was downgraded to secondary. Until some time between 1940 and 1946, SR 59 followed Laurel Run Road from the state line to near Liberty Furnace. The part east of Columbia Furnace was renumbered as part of an extension of SR 42 in 1947, and in 1949 the remainder was downgraded to secondary.

Major intersections

The entire route is in Shenandoah County.

| Location | mi | km | Destinations | Notes |
|---|---|---|---|---|
| | 0.00 | 0.00 | WV 59 west – Lost City | West Virginia state line |
| Liberty Furnace | | | SR 691 (Dellinger Acres Road) / SR 717 (Liberty Furnace Road) – Jerome | |
| | | | SR 675 (Wolf Gap Road) – Wolf Gap, Wardensville | |
| Columbia Furnace | 12.10 | 19.47 | SR 260 south (Back Road) to SR 263 – Edinburg | now SR 675 |
| Columbia Furnace | | | SR 623 (Back Road) – Fairview, St. Luke | |
| Woodstock | 18.50 | 29.77 | US 11 south (South Main Street) – Edinburg | |
| Woodstock | 19.65 | 31.62 | US 11 north (North Main Street) – Toms Brook | |
| | 24.75 | 39.83 | SR 758 (Woodstock Tower Road) | |
1.000 mi = 1.609 km; 1.000 km = 0.621 mi

== SR 158 ==
State Route 158
- Location: Grove Hill-Alma
- Existed: 1928–1943

State Route 158 followed present SR 650, an alternate for SR 12 (now US 340) lying east of the South Fork Shenandoah River between Grove Hill and Alma. Most of it was added to the primary state highway system in 1928 as State Route 816, with 1 mile (1.6 km) at the Grove Hill end waiting until 1929. SR 816 was renumbered State Route 258 in the 1933 renumbering, but in the 1940 renumbering it became SR 158, since US 258 was replacing US 158. The entire route was downgraded to secondary in 1943.

Major intersections

The entire route is in Page County.

| Location | mi | km | Destinations | Notes |
|---|---|---|---|---|
| Grove Hill | 0.00 | 0.00 | SR 12 | now US 340 |
| Alma | 6.65 | 10.70 | SR 12 / SR 636 (Wampler Drive) | now US 340 Bus. |
1.000 mi = 1.609 km; 1.000 km = 0.621 mi

== SR 261 ==
State Route 261
- Location: Winchester-West Virginia
- Existed: 1928–1951

State Route 261 extended north from US 522 northwest of Winchester along current secondary SR 739 (Apple Pie Ridge Road) to the West Virginia state line, where it connected with County Route 26 to Bunker Hill. State Route 827 was created in 1928 as the southernmost 2.7 miles (4.3 km) of what would become SR 261. It was extended 2 miles (3.2 km) in 1930 and another 4 miles (6.4 km) to the state line in 1932. SR 827 became the northwest end of SR 3 in the 1933 renumbering, but in the 1940 renumbering the part of SR 3 from Winchester to Sperryville became SR 522, and the orphaned piece north of Winchester was renumbered SR 261. The route was downgraded to secondary in 1951.

== SR 262 ==
State Route 262
- Location: Forestville-New Market
- Existed: 1928–1947

State Route 262 followed current secondary SR 767 from SR 42 at Forestville east through Quicksburg to US 11 north of New Market. It was added to the primary state highway system in 1928 as part of State Route 819, which initially continued southwest from Forestville towards Timberville. In 1930 it was extended to the Rockingham County line, but existing SR 818 was simultaneously extended to meet it from the Timberville end, and another piece of SR 818 was created north of Forestville, so SR 819 southwest of Forestville was soon renumbered as part of SR 818. In the 1933 renumbering, SR 819 was renumbered 262, which was downgraded to secondary in 1947.

Major intersections

The entire route is in Shenandoah County.

| Location | mi | km | Destinations | Notes |
|---|---|---|---|---|
| Forestville | 0.00 | 0.00 | SR 42 / SR 614 (Senedo Road / South Middle Road) | |
| | 5.30 | 8.53 | US 11 (Old Valley Pike) to I-81 – Winchester, Staunton | |
1.000 mi = 1.609 km; 1.000 km = 0.621 mi

== SR 264 ==
State Route 264
- Location: Fitzwater-Bergton
- Existed: 1932–1953

State Route 264 followed current secondary SR 820 from SR 259 at Fitzwater west to SR 826 at Bergton. It was added to the primary state highway system in 1932 as State Route 844, renumbered SR 264 in the 1933 renumbering, and downgraded to secondary in 1953 as an extension of existing SR 820.

Major intersections

The entire route is in Rockingham County.

| Location | mi | km | Destinations | Notes |
|---|---|---|---|---|
| Bergton | 0.00 | 0.00 | SR 820 (Bergton Road) / SR 826 (Criders Road) – Criders, German River, West Virginia line | |
| Fitzwater | 2.00 | 3.22 | SR 259 (Brocks Gap Road) – West Virginia line, Broadway | |
1.000 mi = 1.609 km; 1.000 km = 0.621 mi

== SR 265 ==
State Route 265
- Location: Basye-north
- Existed: 1932–1943

State Route 265 extended north from SR 263 at Basye along current SR 717 for 1 mile (1.6 km) in the direction of Bird Haven. (SR 717 continues northeast to Liberty Furnace, and then follows former SR 59 to SR 675.) It was added to the primary state highway system in 1932 as State Route 845, running along the old Mount Jackson and Howard's Lick Turnpike, renumbered SR 265 in the 1933 renumbering, and downgraded to secondary in 1943 as an extension of existing SR 717.

Major intersections

The entire route is in Shenandoah County.

| Location | mi | km | Destinations | Notes |
|---|---|---|---|---|
| Basye | 0.00 | 0.00 | SR 263 (Orkney Grade) to US 11 – Orkney Springs | |
| | 1.00 | 1.61 | SR 717 (Alum Springs Road) | |
1.000 mi = 1.609 km; 1.000 km = 0.621 mi

== SR 266 ==
State Route 266
- Location: Stanley-Luray-northwest
- Existed: 1928–1952

State Route 266 extended from SR 12 (now US 340 Business) in Stanley east, north, and west along current SR 689 via Ida and Fairview to Luray. After an overlap with US 211 (now US 211 Business), SR 266 turned north on Lee Street, then ran northwest along current SR 675 in the direction of Edinburg, extending beyond the South Fork Shenandoah River to the northern intersection with SR 615 at the foot of Massanutten Mountain.

3.7 miles (6.0 km) north of Luray were added to the state highway system in 1928 as State Route 821, which was extended another 1 mile (1.6 km) in 1931. South of Luray, two segments of 3 miles (4.8 km) each were added at either end in 1930, both as State Route 836. (1.8 miles (2.9 km) at the south end had previously been part of SR 16 from 1918 to 1922, and even earlier was part of the Blue Ridge Turnpike.) The gap between Stanley and Luray was filled in 1932.

SR 821 and SR 836 became SR 266 in the 1933 renumbering, except for the southernmost 1.8 miles (2.9 km), which was instead part of SR 231, disconnected from the main part of that route by a never-improved piece of the old Blue Ridge Turnpike over Fishers Gap. Two changes were made in 1944. First, the segment north of Luray was downgraded to secondary (becoming an extension of existing SR 678). At the same time, a stub of SR 231 east of Fishers Gap was downgraded, leading to the extension of SR 266 to Stanley, replacing the disconnected piece of SR 231 west of Fishers Gap. This remaining piece of SR 266 only lasted until 1952, when it too was downgraded as a new SR 689.

Major intersections

The entire route is in Page County.

| Location | mi | km | Destinations | Notes |
|---|---|---|---|---|
| Stanley | 0.00 | 0.00 | SR 12 (East Main Street) – Shenandoah, Luray | now US 340 Bus. |
| | 1.80 | 2.90 | SR 611 (Kite Hollow Road) | former SR 16 south (1918-1922) to Fishers Gap |
| Fairview | 9.86 | 15.87 | SR 279 east (Fairview Road) – Lake Arrowhead | |
| | 11.21 | 18.04 | US 211 east (East Main Street) | south end of US 211 overlap; now US 211 Bus. |
| Luray | 11.81 | 19.01 | US 340 (Broad Street) | now US 340 Bus. |
| Luray | 12.16 | 19.57 | US 211 west (West Main Street) | north end of US 211 overlap; now US 211 Bus. |
| | 16.61 | 26.73 | SR 615 (Serenity Ridge Road) / SR 678 (Fort Valley Road) | now SR 675 |
1.000 mi = 1.609 km; 1.000 km = 0.621 mi

== SR 267 ==
State Route 267
- Location: Stringtown-north
- Existed: 1928–1951

State Route 267 followed current SR 611 (the old Cross Roads and Summit Point Turnpike) from US 340 near Stringtown north to the West Virginia state line in the direction of Summit Point. It was added to the primary state highway system in 1928 as State Route 823, renumbered SR 267 in the 1933 renumbering, and downgraded to secondary in 1951.

Major intersections

The entire route is in Clarke County.

| Location | mi | km | Destinations | Notes |
|---|---|---|---|---|
| | 0.00 | 0.00 | US 340 (Lord Fairfax Highway) | |
| | 2.80 | 4.51 | CR 1 (Leetown Road) | West Virginia state line |
1.000 mi = 1.609 km; 1.000 km = 0.621 mi

== SR 268 ==
State Route 268
- Location: Warm Springs-Clearwater Park
- Existed: 1930–1951

State Route 268 extended southwest from SR 39 west of Warm Springs along present SR 687 through Bacova and Falling Spring (formerly Barber) to US 220 at Clearwater Park. Portions of the route were once the Jackson River Turnpike and Alleghany and Huntersville Turnpike.

State Route 828 was created in 1930, with 4.5 miles (7.2 km) at the Warm Springs end and 5.5 miles (8.9 km) at the Clearwater Park end. The 14 miles (23 km) gap was filled in 1932, and in the 1933 renumbering SR 828 became SR 268. The 5.7 miles (9.2 km) north of SR 615 at Bacova Junction were downgraded to secondary in 1945, initially becoming an extension of SR 615, and in 1951 the remainder joined it as new SR 687.

Major intersections

| County | Location | mi | km | Destinations | Notes |
|---|---|---|---|---|---|
| Alleghany | Clearwater Park | 0.00 | 0.00 | US 220 (Hot Springs Trail) – Hot Springs, Covington | |
| Alleghany | | | | SR 641 (Indian Draft Road) – Gathright Dam | |
| Bath | Bacova Junction | 18.10 | 29.13 | SR 615 (Bacova Junction Highway) – Hot Springs | |
| Bath | | 23.78 | 38.27 | SR 39 (Mountain Valley Road) – Lake Moomaw | |
1.000 mi = 1.609 km; 1.000 km = 0.621 mi

== SR 269 ==
State Route 269
- Location: Millboro Springs-West Virginia
- Existed: 1928–1955

State Route 269 followed present secondary SR 678 and SR 654 from SR 39 at Windy Cove (west of Millboro Springs) north through Williamsville, McDowell, and Doe Hill to the West Virginia state line in the direction of Moyers.

The first portion to become a state highway was north from SR 39 (now US 250) at McDowell, with 3.7 miles (6.0 km) of State Route 803 added in 1928, 1.5 miles (2.4 km) in 1929, another 1.5 miles in 1930, 1 mile (1.6 km) in 1931, and the final 1.8 miles (2.9 km) to the state line in 1934 (as SR 269). This section was extended south from McDowell for 3.9 miles (6.3 km) in 1930, and a second piece was created running north 5.7 miles (9.2 km) from SR 804 at Windy Cove towards McDowell; the latter received another 1 mile (1.6 km) in 1931. These two stubs were extended south 3.1 miles (5.0 km) and north 3.9 miles (6.3 km) respectively in 1932, and later that year the entire length of SR 803 became an extended SR 804. SR 803 was split back out on its own in the 1933 renumbering, when it became SR 269.

A further extension of 9.3 miles (15.0 km) south from McDowell in 1935 and a final addition of 5.7 miles (9.2 km) in 1936 filled the gap and made SR 269 continuous from Windy Cove to West Virginia. The route survived until the 1950s; in 1952 the piece north of McDowell was downgraded to secondary pending completion of ongoing construction, with the rest downgraded in 1953 under the same conditions. The last relevant mentions of SR 269 in the State Highway Commission minutes are in 1954 and 1955, when various sections of former alignment in Highland and Bath Counties respectively bypassed by this construction were abandoned.

Major intersections

| County | Location | mi | km | Destinations | Notes |
|---|---|---|---|---|---|
| Bath | Windy Cove | 0.00 | 0.00 | SR 39 (Mountain Valley Road) – Millboro Springs, Warm Springs | |
| Bath | | | | SR 629 (Deerfield Road) | former SR 17 south (1918-1922) |
| Bath | Green Valley | | | SR 629 (Deerfield Road) | former SR 17 north (1918-1922) |
| Highland | McDowell | 31.68 | 50.98 | US 250 east (Highland Turnpike) – Staunton | south end of US 250 overlap |
| Highland | McDowell | 31.98 | 51.47 | US 250 west (Highland Turnpike) – Monterey | north end of US 250 overlap |
| Highland | | 41.05 | 66.06 | CR 23 (Johnstown Road) | West Virginia state line |
1.000 mi = 1.609 km; 1.000 km = 0.621 mi

== SR 270 ==
State Route 270
- Location: Little California-Goshen
- Existed: 1930–1948

State Route 270 extended northeast along the old Jordan's Furnace and Rockbridge Turnpike, now secondary SR 780, from SR 850 (old US 60) near Little California to SR 39 near Goshen. The first piece became a state highway in 1930, when the 0.4 miles (0.64 km) State Route 837 was created at the south end. It had become part of SR 805 by 1932, when what was now a gap in SR 805 was filled. The road south of Goshen was split back out as SR 270 in the 1933 renumbering, and was downgraded to secondary in 1948. SR 780 was extended south from US 60 to the new I-64 in about 1980.

Major intersections

The entire route is in Rockbridge County.

| Location | mi | km | Destinations | Notes |
|---|---|---|---|---|
| | 0.00 | 0.00 | SR 780 / SR 850 (West Midland Trail) to I-64 – Clifton Forge, Lexington | |
| | 9.35 | 15.05 | SR 39 (Maury River Road) – Goshen, Lexington | |
1.000 mi = 1.609 km; 1.000 km = 0.621 mi

== SR 273 ==
State Route 273
- Location: Ladd-Fishersville
- Existed: 1930–1955

State Route 273 extended from SR 12 (now US 340) at Ladd northwest to Tinkling Spring and northeast to US 250 at Fishersville along present SR 631, SR 630 (now cut by I-64), SR 640, and SR 285. Just over half of the route at the Ladd end was added to the state highway system in 1930 as State Route 832, and in 1932 it was extended the rest of the way to Fishersville. It was renumbered SR 273 in the 1933 renumbering and downgraded to secondary in 1947. The portion northeast of Tinkling Spring returned to the primary system in 1998 as part of SR 285.

== SR 274 ==
State Route 274
- Location: Stephenson-West Virginia
- Existed: 1930–1955

State Route 274 followed present secondary SR 761 from US 11 southwest of Stephenson to the West Virginia state line in the direction of Summit Point and Charles Town. Most of the route became a state highway in 1930 as State Route 833, with the remaining 0.4 miles (0.64 km) to the state line being added in 1932. It was renumbered SR 274 in the 1933 renumbering and downgraded to secondary in 1955.

Major intersections

| County | Location | mi | km | Destinations | Notes |
|---|---|---|---|---|---|
| Frederick | | 0.00 | 0.00 | US 11 (Martinsburg Pike) | |
| Clarke | | 7.52 | 12.10 | CR 2 (Hardesty Road) | West Virginia state line |
1.000 mi = 1.609 km; 1.000 km = 0.621 mi

== SR 276 and SR 282 ==
State Route 276
- Location: east of Berrys toward Frogtown
- Existed: 1931–1943

State Route 282
- Location: Webbtown-Gaylord
- Existed: 1931–1943

State Route 276 followed a 2 miles (3.2 km) portion of current SR 606, from US 50 east of Berrys northeast towards Frogtown, while State Route 282 extended from SR 7 at Webbtown to US 340 near Gaylord on current SR 608 and SR 612.

What would become SR 276 was added to the primary system in 1931 as State Route 839. In 1932, the majority of future SR 282 was added as a second piece of SR 839, which was split into SR 276 and SR 282 in the 1933 renumbering. SR 282 was extended the remaining 1 mile (1.6 km) to US 340 in October 1933, but in 1943 both routes were downgraded to secondary.

== SR 279 ==
State Route 279
- Location: Fairview-east
- Existed: 1932–1943

State Route 279 followed present secondary SR 669 from SR 689 (former SR 266) at Fairview (now inside Luray town limits) east to near the Luray Reservoir. It was added to the primary state highway system in 1932 as State Route 841, renumbered SR 279 in the 1933 renumbering, and downgraded to secondary in 1943 as an extension of existing SR 669.

== SR 280 ==
State Route 280
- Location: north of Luray
- Existed: 1932–1944

State Route 280 extended northwest along present SR 648 and SR 654 from SR 12 (now US 340) between Luray and Springfield for 1.5 miles (2.4 km) in the direction of Fletchers Chapel. It was added to the primary state highway system in 1932 as State Route 842, renumbered SR 280 in the 1933 renumbering, and downgraded to secondary in 1944.

== SR 281 ==
State Route 281
- Location: Effinger-southwest
- Existed: 1932–1945

State Route 281 followed current secondary SR 612 from SR 251 at Effinger to SR 644 near Oakdale. It was added to the primary state highway system in 1932 as State Route 843 (early maps show it forking south on SR 611 rather than west on SR 612 towards Oakdale), and renumbered SR 281 in the 1933 renumbering. In 1945 the entire route was downgraded to secondary as an extension of existing SR 612.

== SR 284 ==
State Route 284
- Location: Forks of Waters-Blue Grass
- Existed: 1928–1946

State Route 284 extended west from US 220 at Forks of Waters along part of present SR 642 to 1/10 mile (0.16 km) short of SR 640 at Blue Grass. This paralleled the South Branch Potomac River near its headwaters. The road was added to the primary state highway system in 1928 as State Route 802. It became State Route 250 in the 1933 renumbering, but in 1935 US 250 entered the state and SR 250 became SR 284. The route was downgraded to secondary in 1946 as an extension of existing SR 642.
