= List of former primary state highways in Virginia =

The following is a partial list of former primary state highways in the U.S. state of Virginia. Long-distance routes are listed here, while those entirely or mostly within one VDOT district are at the following pages:

- Bristol District: 59–98 (1933), 65 (1940), 77 (1940), 78 (1940), 289 (1934)
- Salem District: 99–124 (1933), 245 (1940), 294 (1935)
- Lynchburg District: 125–135 (1933), 150–152 (1933), 283 (1933), 126 (1948), 158 (1947), 297 (1935)
- Richmond District 136–149 (1933), 153–163 (1933), 197 (1933), 4 Alt. (1935), 33 Alt. (1937), 44 (1933), 336 (1938), 416-418 (1981)
- Hampton Roads (formerly Suffolk) District: 164–196 (1933), 32 (1933), 33 (1933), 88 (1940), 152 (ca. 1943), 163 (1945), 192 (1951), 285–288 (1933), 305 (1941), 312 (1937), 407–411 (1981), 414 (1981)
- Fredericksburg District: 198–229 (1933), 124 (ca. 1937), 209 (1957), 229 (ca. 1936), 293 (1935)
- Culpeper and Northern Virginia Districts: 230–248 (1933), 110 (1947), 253 (1967), 275 (1941), 335 (ca. 1938)
- Staunton District: 249–282 (1933), 59 (1940), 158 (1940), 261 (1940), 278 (1940), 284 (1935), 292 (1935)

Historic numbers for current routes are listed at list of primary state highways in Virginia.

== SR 14 ==
State Route 14
- Location: Danville–Crows
- Existed: 1918–1933

State Route 14 was a primary state highway in the U.S. state of Virginia. It was formed as part of the initial system in 1918, and always ran from the North Carolina state line through Danville, Lynchburg, and Lexington to West Virginia. In 1926, this was designated as U.S. Route 170 from North Carolina to Lynchburg and U.S. Route 60 from Lynchburg to West Virginia (except between Glasgow and Lexington, where US 60 used State Route 141 and State Route 33 via Natural Bridge). In the 1933 renumbering, the piece from Lynchburg to Lexington, including the Glasgow-Lexington section, became U.S. Route 501, as US 60 was rerouted to the north east of Lexington; all of SR 14 was removed in the 1933 renumbering.

Spurs of State Route 14 between 1923 and 1928

- State Route 141, Natural Bridge Station to Natural Bridge, now part of State Route 130
- State Route 142, Clifton Forge to Eagle Rock, now part of U.S. Route 220
- State Route 143, Crows to West Virginia, now part of State Route 311
- State Route 144, Danville to North Carolina, now State Route 86

== SR 27 ==
State Route 27
- Location: Powhatan–Sperryville
- Existed: 1940–1953

State Route 27 was a primary state highway in the U.S. state of Virginia. At its peak, it ran from near Powhatan to Sperryville via Columbia, Louisa, Orange, and Madison. The route was never continuous, with gaps filled by secondary routes. The route was at first known as State Route 16 from 1918 to 1940; the State Route 16 designation was needed in the 1940 renumbering to match other states, and so the road was SR 27 from 1940 to the final decommissioning in 1953.

The former SR 27 now carries the following designations:

- State Route 684, U.S. Route 60 near Powhatan to State Route 45 near Cartersville
- State Route 690, near Cartersville to State Route 6 in Columbia
- State Route 659, Columbia to U.S. Route 250 at Ferncliff
- State Route 208, Ferncliff to U.S. Route 33 in Louisa
- State Route 669 and State Route 612, Louisa to U.S. Route 15 in Orange
- State Route 230, US 15 at Madison Mills to U.S. Route 29 near Madison
- State Route 231, Madison to U.S. Route 211 at Sperryville

In the initial 1918 state highway system, State Route 16 ran from State Route 2 (now U.S. Route 15) at Madison Mills to State Route 3 (now U.S. Route 11) at New Market via Madison and Luray, crossing the Blue Ridge Mountains at Fishers Gap. North of Madison, this was the path of the Blue Ridge Turnpike. In 1921, the State Highway Commission recommended that the legislature relocate SR 16 to run via Sperryville and Thornton Gap rather than Stanley to "eliminate a very difficult and expensive crossing of the Blue Ridge" and provide "a direct connection with the Lee Highway at Sperryville". By 1923, SR 16 was truncated to Sperryville; the piece from Sperryville west to New Market became an extension of State Route 21.

Major intersections

County	Location	mi	km	Destinations	Notes
Powhatan				US 60 (Anderson Highway) / SR 601 (Lockin Road)	
Cumberland				SR 45 north (Cartersville Road) / SR 600 (Deep Run Road)	south end of SR 45 overlap
Cumberland	Hamilton			SR 45 south (Cartersville Road)	north end of SR 45 overlap
Cumberland	Duncans Store			SR 610 (Duncan Store Road)	
Fluvanna	Columbia			SR 6 east (St. James Street) / SR 667 (Old Columbia Road)	south end of SR 6 overlap
Fluvanna	Columbia			SR 6 west (St. James Street)	north end of SR 6 overlap
Louisa	Ferncliff			US 250 (Three Notch Road) – Charlottesville, Richmond	
Louisa	Louisa			US 33 east / SR 22 east (East Main Street) – Cuckoo, Mineral	south end of US 33 / SR 22 overlap
Louisa	Louisa			US 33 west / SR 22 west (East Main Street) – Trevilians	north end of US 33 / SR 22 overlap
Louisa	Brocks Bridge			SR 665 (Ellisville Drive)	now SR 669
Gap in route
Madison				US 15 (James Madison Highway) – Culpeper, Madison Mills, Orange	
Madison	Pratts			SR 231 south (South Blue Ridge Turnpike) / SR 687 (Fairground Road) – Somerset, Gordonsville	south end of SR 231 overlap
Madison				US 29 south / SR 230 west (South Seminole Trail) – Charlottesville, Stanardsville	south end of US 29 / SR 230 overlap
Madison	Madison			SR 230 east (Washington Street)	north end of SR 230 overlap; now SR 634
Madison	Madison			US 29 north (North Main Street) – Culpeper	north end of US 29 overlap
Madison	Banco			SR 231 north (Old Blue Ridge Turnpike) – Criglersville, Syria, Graves Mountain, White Oak Canyon	north end of SR 231 overlap; now SR 670
Rappahannock	Revercombs Corner			SR 232 east (Slate Mills Road) / SR 606 (Sharp Rock Road) – Slate Mills	now SR 707
Rappahannock				SR 246 east (Hawlin Road)	now SR 618
Rappahannock				US 522 / SR 3 (Sperryville Pike) – Sperryville, Culpeper, Shenandoah National Park, Skyline Drive, Luray Caverns	
1.000 mi = 1.609 km; 1.000 km = 0.621 mi

== SR 33 ==
State Route 33
- Location: Ridgeway–Rest
- Existed: 1923–1933

State Route 33 was a primary state highway in the U.S. state of Virginia. It was first formed as part of the initial system in 1918; it was State Route 3 until 1923. SR 33 existed until 1933, when it was deemed redundant to the U.S. Routes that used it - U.S. Route 311 (now U.S. Route 220) from North Carolina to Roanoke, and U.S. Route 11 from Roanoke to West Virginia. The number was immediately reused for another route in southeastern Virginia, and in the late 1930s the current State Route 33, an extension of U.S. Route 33, was formed.

From Staunton to Winchester, SR 33 was the Valley Turnpike, taken over by the state in 1918. North of Winchester towards Martinsburg, West Virginia, SR 33 used the Winchester and Martinsburg Turnpike. Tolls were removed in 1919 when the turnpike company gave the road to the state.

Spurs of State Route 33 between 1923 and 1928

- State Route 331, Woodstock west to West Virginia, now State Route 42 and several secondary routes
- State Route 332, Mauzy west and north to West Virginia, now part of State Route 259
- State Route 333, Harrisonburg west to West Virginia, now part of U.S. Route 33
- State Route 334, Greenville east towards Waynesboro, now part of U.S. Route 340
- State Route 335, Rocky Mount northeast to Bedford, now part of State Route 122
- State Route 336, Mt. Jackson west to Orkney Springs, now State Route 263
- State Route 337, Ridgeway southeast to North Carolina, now State Route 87
- State Route 338, Lexington north, west and southwest to Covington, now parts of State Route 39 and Covington
- State Route 339, Winchester northwest to Gainsboro, now part of U.S. Route 522
