= Frogtown, Virginia =

Frogtown is the name of several unincorporated communities in the U.S. state of Virginia.

- Frogtown, Clarke County, Virginia
- Frogtown, Fauquier County, Virginia, Fauquier County, Virginia
