= U.S. Route 340 =

US Numbered Highway in Virginia, West Virginia and Maryland, United States

U.S. Route 340
- US 340 highlighted in red

Route information
- Auxiliary route of US 40
- Maintained by VDOT, WVDOH, and MDSHA
- Length: 155.64 mi (Note: Length is the sum of state mileages.) (250.48 km)
- Existed: 1926–present
- Tourist routes: Virginia Byway; Washington Heritage Trail; Journey Through Hallowed Ground Byway; Chesapeake and Ohio Canal Scenic Byway

Major junctions
- South end: US 11 in Greenville, VA
- I-64 in Waynesboro, VA; US 250 in Waynesboro, VA; US 33 in Elkton, VA; US 211 in Luray, VA; US 522 in Front Royal, VA; I-66 near Front Royal, VA; US 17 / US 50 near Boyce, VA; WV 9 in Charles Town, WV; US 15 near Jefferson, MD; I-70 in Frederick, MD
- East end: US 15 / US 40 / Jefferson Street in Frederick, MD

Location
- Country: United States
- States: Virginia, West Virginia, Maryland
- Counties: VA: Augusta, City of Waynesboro, Rockingham, Page, Warren, Frederick, Clarke; Loudoun; WV: Jefferson; MD: Washington, Frederick

Highway system
- United States Numbered Highway System; List; Special; Divided
- Virginia Routes; Interstate; US; Primary; Secondary; Byways; History; HOT lanes
- West Virginia State Highway System; Interstate; US; State
- Maryland highway system; Interstate; US; State; Scenic Byways
← SR 339	VA	→ SR 341
← WV 331	WV	→ US 460
← MD 337	MD	→ MD 341

U.S. Route 340 (US 340) is a spur route of US 40, and runs from Greenville, Virginia, to Frederick, Maryland. In Virginia, it runs north–south, parallel and east of US 11, from US 11 north of Greenville via Waynesboro, Grottoes, Elkton, Luray, Front Royal, and Berryville to the West Virginia state line. A short separate piece crosses northern Loudoun County on its way from West Virginia to Maryland.

In West Virginia, it runs north–south in Jefferson County, between Clarke County, Virginia and Loudoun County, Virginia. It is the main route between Charles Town and Harpers Ferry, and it is known as the William L. Wilson Freeway through that stretch. The southern portion of the highway, between the Virginia state line and Charles Town, is known as Berryville Pike.

In Maryland, the U.S. highway runs east–west, for 17.01 miles (27.37 km) from the Virginia state line at the Potomac River at Sandy Hook east to its northern (eastern) terminus at US 15 and US 40 (the Frederick Freeway) in Frederick. US 340, which is known for most of its length as Jefferson National Pike, connects Frederick with the communities of Jefferson, Brunswick, and Knoxville in the southern part of the Middletown Valley of western Frederick County and Weverton in far southern Washington County. The U.S. highway also links Frederick with Harpers Ferry and Charles Town in the Eastern Panhandle of West Virginia. US 340 is a part of the National Highway System for its entire length in Maryland.

US 340 was one of the original state roads designated by the Maryland State Roads Commission. The state road was constructed from Frederick to Knoxville in the early 1910s and completed to Harpers Ferry in 1919. The highway was designated Maryland's portion of US 340 in 1926. US 340 originally crossed the Potomac River at Harpers Ferry; however, the U.S. highway's bridge was destroyed by a flood in 1936. The modern US 340 Bridge was constructed at Sandy Hook between 1940 and 1947, with a long interruption due to World War II. The U.S. highway's freeway between Weverton and Frederick was constructed in the 1960s. Old sections of US 340 became part of Maryland Route 180 (MD 180).

== Route description ==
Lengths
	mi	km
VA (Note: Length includes the 0.57-mile-long (0.92 km) portion in Loudoun County.)	122.60	197.31
WV	16.03	25.80
MD	17.01	27.37
Total	155.64	250.48

US 340 has a length of 122.60 miles (197.31 km) in Virginia. This number includes the 0.57-mile-long (0.92 km) second Virginia segment between the 16.03-mile-long (25.80 km) stretch through West Virginia and the 17.01-mile-long (27.37 km) route in Maryland.

US 340 contains several segments that are part of the National Highway System. The U.S. highway is part of the main system from Virginia State Route 7 (SR 7) near Berryville to its northern terminus in Frederick. US 340 is a National Highway System principal arterial from I-64 to its eastern junction with US 250 in Waynesboro, along its US 211 concurrency near Luray, and from US 522 to I-66 in Front Royal. The U.S. Highway's other junctions with highways part of the National Highway System include US 33 in Elkton, West Virginia Route 9 (WV 9) in Charles Town, and Maryland Route 180 (MD 180) in Knoxville as part of an intermodal connection to Brunswick station.

=== Greenville to Elkton ===
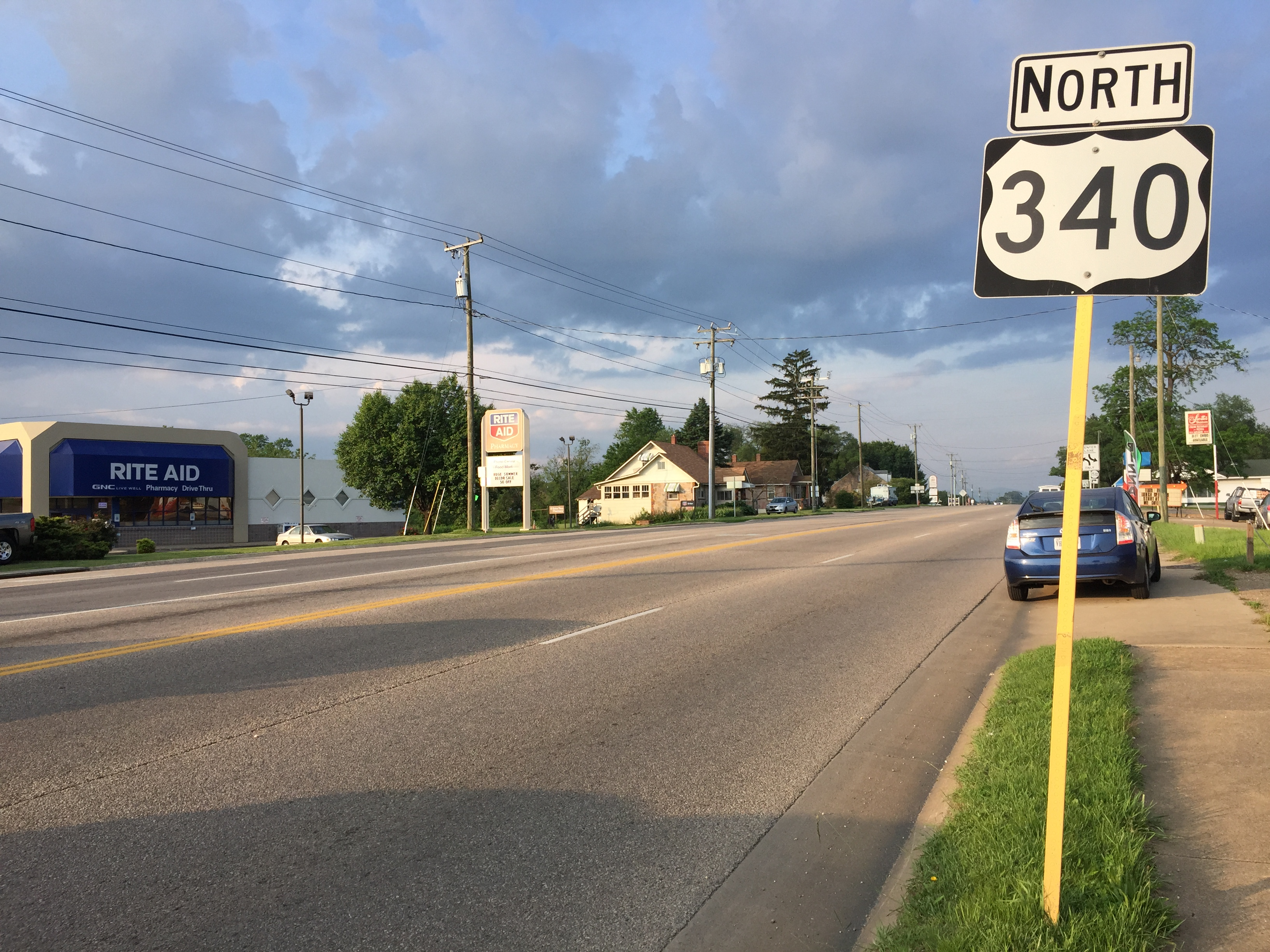
View north along US 340 past SR 608 in Stuarts Draft, Virginia

US 340 begins at an intersection with US 11 (Lee Highway) on the northern edge of Greenville and just east of US 11's interchange with I-64 and I-81 in southern Augusta County. The U.S. Highway heads northeast as two-lane Stuarts Draft Highway, which crosses several branches of Christians Creek and then Christians Creek itself. US 340 expands to a five-lane road with center turn lane west of the village of Stuarts Draft. The highway passes the historic Harper House then expands to divided highway. US 340 passes through the hamlet of Ladd before leaving Augusta County and entering the independent city of Waynesboro at its partial cloverleaf interchange with I-64. The highway follows Rosser Avenue northeast, crosses Pratts Run, and reduces to two lanes as the route approaches the west end of downtown, where the route meets US 250. Both highways must turn off to stay on the route: US 250 heads west on Main Street and, via the north leg of the four-legged intersection, east on four-lane Broad Street, and US 340 turns east onto two-lane Main Street.

US 340 meets the eastern end of SR 254 (Poplar Avenue) and passes by Waynesboro High School, the Fishburne Military School, and the historic Plumb House and Coiner-Quesenbery House in the Waynesboro Downtown Historic District. The U.S. Highway crosses the South River and intersects US 250 at the east end of Broad Street. The two highways run concurrently east along four-lane Main Street and under Norfolk Southern Railway's Roanoke District rail line to Delphine Avenue, onto which US 340 turns north. The five-lane street with center turn lane passes through the Basic City portion of Waynesboro, where the highway passes under the Buckingham Branch Railroad, crosses Steel Run, and passes by Fairfax Hall. US 340 passes the General Electric Specialty Control Plant and parallels the Norfolk Southern rail line north out of the city and back into Augusta County.

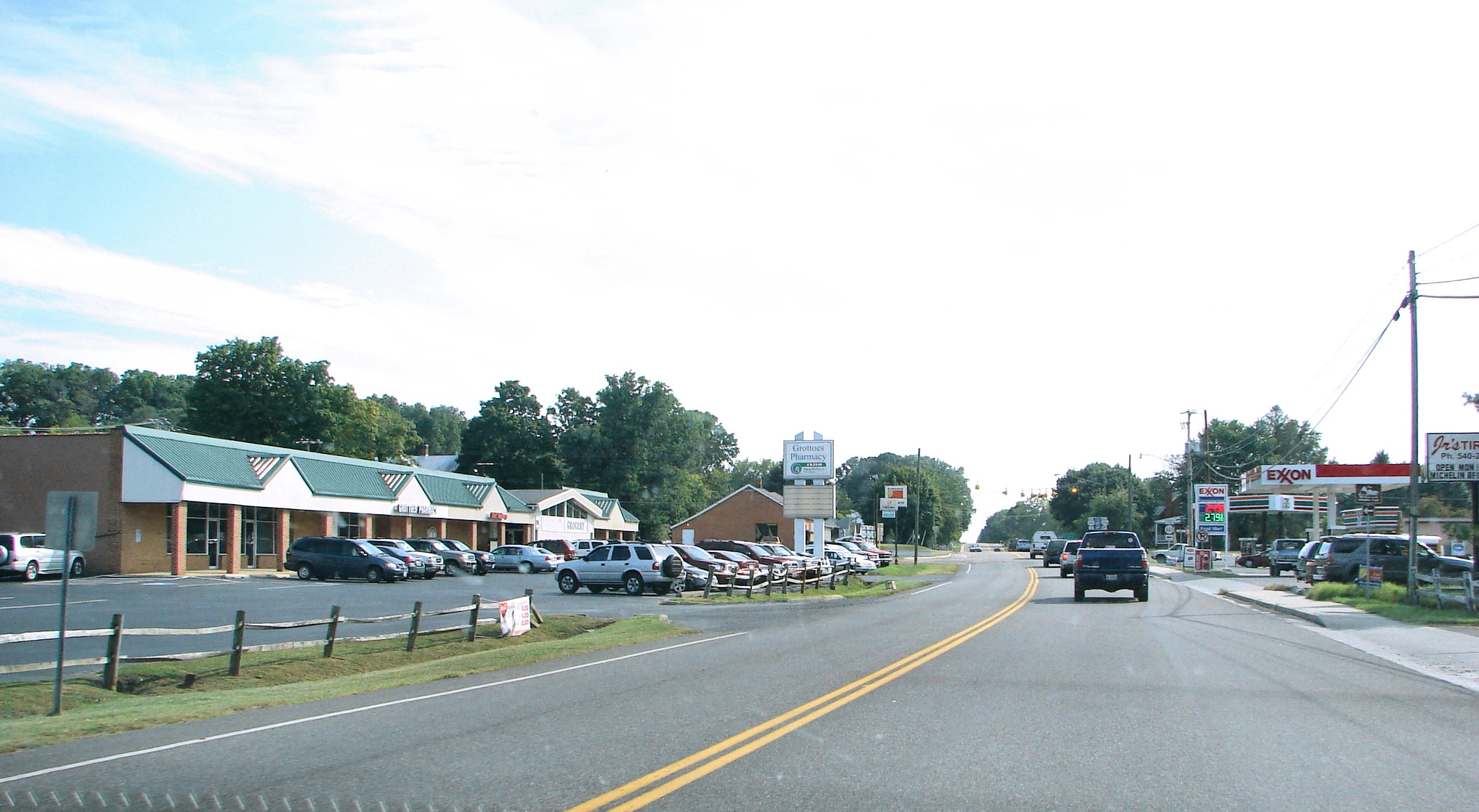
US 340 through Grottoes, Virginia

US 340 continues north as East Side Highway, which parallels the South River and the rail line along the flank of the Blue Ridge Mountains along the eastern edge of the Shenandoah Valley. The highway crosses Sawmill Run and reduces to two lanes in the community of Dooms and crosses Mine Branch in the village of Crimora. US 340 crosses Meadows Run, Pains Run, and Still Run and enters Rockingham County at the south end of the town of Grottoes. The highway follows Augusta Avenue through the east side of the town and meets the eastern end of SR 256 (Third Street). US 340 curves northeast and meets the eastern end of SR 253 (Port Republic Road) south of Port Republic, where the South River and North River merge to form the South Fork Shenandoah River. The highway passes to the south of the historic estate Bogota and by a monument to the Battle of Port Republic at Lynnwood. US 340 closely parallels the railroad through Berrytown to the town of Elkton, where the route follows Stuart Avenue. The highway expands to a four-lane divided highway for its partial cloverleaf interchange with US 33 (Spotswood Trail) and briefly runs concurrently with US 33 Bus. from the interchange to Old Spotswood Trail, onto which the business route continues west.

=== Elkton to Front Royal ===
US 340 leaves Elkton along a continuation of Stuart Avenue and continues north through the Page Valley, the valley of the South Fork Shenandoah River between the Blue Ridge Mountains to the east and Massanutten Mountain to the west. The highway crosses Dry Run, passes by the historic home Bon Air, and at Verbena crosses Naked Creek into Page County. US 340 curves northwest and enters the town of Shenandoah along Fourth Street. In the center of the Shenandoah Historic District, the highway curves north onto Fifth Street. Shortly after leaving the town, US 340 crosses over Norfolk Southern's Hagerstown District rail line. The highway passes through Grove Hill and crosses over the South Fork Shenandoah River. US 340 crosses Cub Run and passes through the hamlet of Newport before meeting the southern end of US 340 Bus. (Stonewall Jackson Memorial Highway), which heads east and then north through Alma and Stanley. The U.S. Highway heads through Battle Creek and meets US 211 at Intersections at the base of that highway's ascent of Massanutten Mountain to New Market Gap. US 340 and US 211 run concurrently along four-lane divided Lee Highway northeast toward Luray. The routes pass by the historic estate Massanutton Heights, pass through Salem, and cross the South Fork Shenandoah River at Whitehouse Landing, the site of The White House. The two U.S. highways head northeast to bypass Luray where US 211 Business (Main Street) heads east into the town just south of Luray Caverns. After crossing Hawksbill Creek, US 340 leaves US 211 at a diamond interchange that serves as the northern terminus of US 340 Bus. (Broad Street).

US 340 continues northeast as two-lane Stonewall Jackson Memorial Highway through the communities of Springfield, Big Spring, and Oak Hill. The highway crosses Jeremys Run at Rileyville and crosses over the rail line between there and Compton, north of which the route passes under the railroad. US 340 enters Warren County at the hamlet of Overall by crossing Overall Run on the Overall Bridge, a Pratt deck arch truss bridge next to the rail line's bridge; these crossings are near the Milford Battlefield. The highway continues through Bentonville, the site of Shenandoah River Raymond R. "Andy" Guest Jr. State Park. US 340 crosses over the rail line and Flint Run north of Limeton and through Karo between its bridges across Gooney Run and Dry Run. The U.S. Highway temporarily expands to a four-lane divided highway and meets the northern terminus of Skyline Drive as the route enters the town of Front Royal at the north end of the Page Valley.

US 340 enters Front Royal along four-lane Royal Avenue; the highway drops to two lanes at SR 55 (South Street), from which the state highway joins U.S. Highway. The two highways pass the Warren County Courthouse at the west end of the Front Royal Historic District. US 340 and SR 55 meet US 522 next to Rose Hill at Commercial Avenue, from which the other U.S. Highway joins the concurrency. The three highways follow four-lane Royal Avenue north to a right-angle curve where the three routes curve onto 14th Street and then turn north onto four-lane divided Shenandoah Street. US 340, US 522, and SR 55 cross Norfolk Southern's Hagerstown District rail line and the South Fork Shenandoah River into the Riverton area of Front Royal, where SR 55 splits to the west onto Strasburg Road. The two U.S. Highways then cross the North Fork Shenandoah River and Norfolk Southern Railway's B-Line just west of the confluence of the two Shenandoah River forks. US 340 and US 522 cross Crooked Run and have a partial cloverleaf interchange with I-66 as they leave the town of Front Royal.

=== Front Royal to Harpers Ferry ===
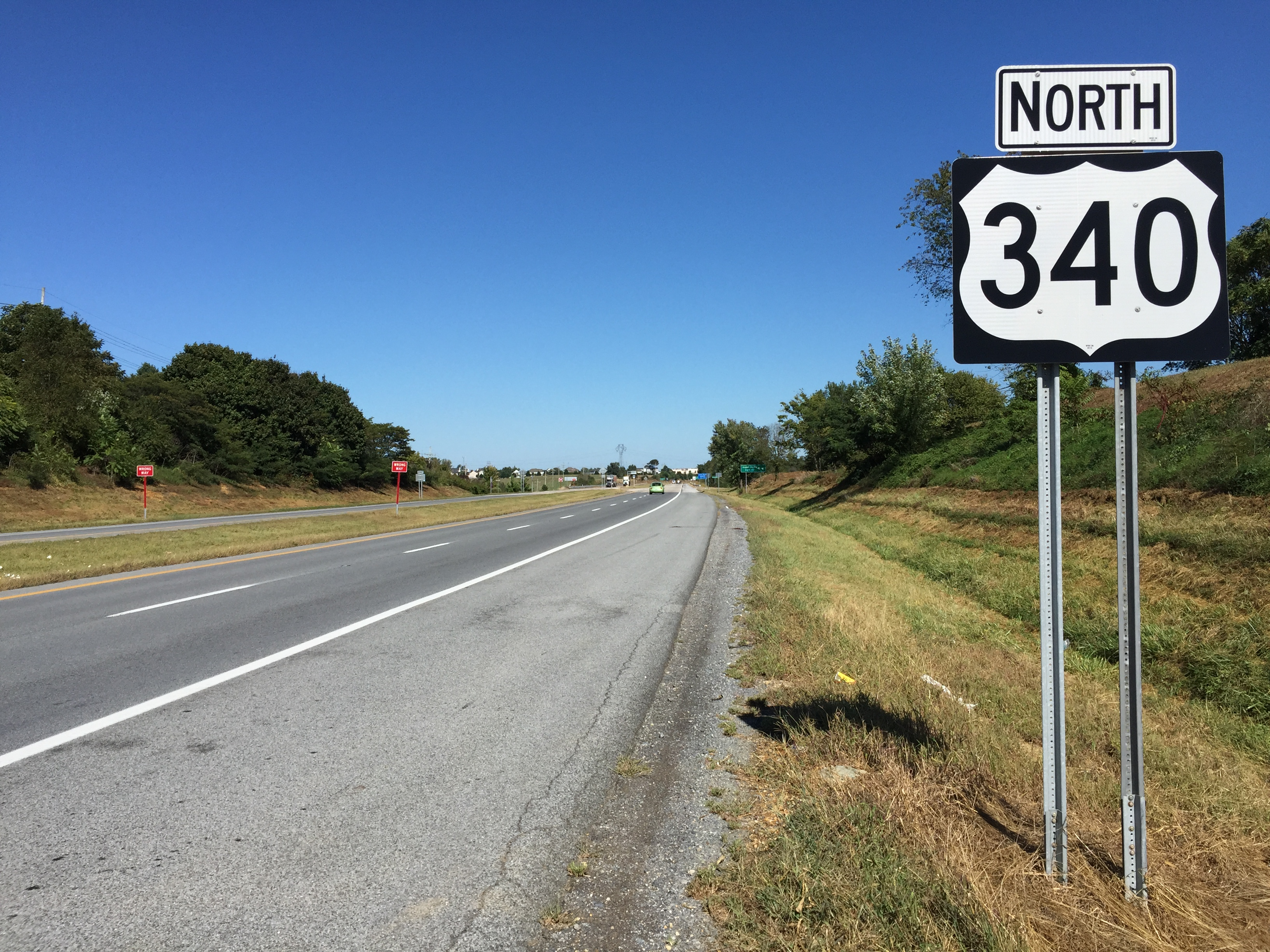
View north along US 340 south of CR 340/3 to the south of Charles Town, West Virginia

US 340 and US 522 head north along four-lane divided Winchester Road. The highways pass through Cedarville, the site of the Virginia Inland Port, and through Nineveh, the site of the historic estate Erin. North of Nineveh, the routes follow the Warren–Frederick county line and enter Clarke County, where the road is named Stonewall Jackson Highway. US 340 and US 522 diverge at a four-legged intersection at Double Tollgate, from which US 522 continues north toward Winchester; the west leg of the junction is SR 277 (Fairfax Pike), which heads toward Stephens City. US 340 heads east along two-lane Lord Fairfax Highway. The highway passes north of Greenway Court and veers north at White Post, the site of the Greenway Historic District and the White Post Historic District. US 340 intersects US 17 and US 50 (Millwood Pike) at Waterloo and passes through the town of Boyce and its eponymous historic district, surrounding which are three historic plantations: Huntingdon, Saratoga, and Scaleby. The highway crosses Page Brook and parallels the Hagerstown District rail line through the Chapel Rural Historic District, which is centered around the namesake old chapel at the route's junction with SR 255 (Bishop Meade Road) at Briggs. US 340 continues to the town of Berryville, through which the route follows Buckmarsh Street. The U.S. Highway intersects SR 7 Bus. (Main Street) within the Berryville Historic District, which contains the Old Clarke County Courthouse.

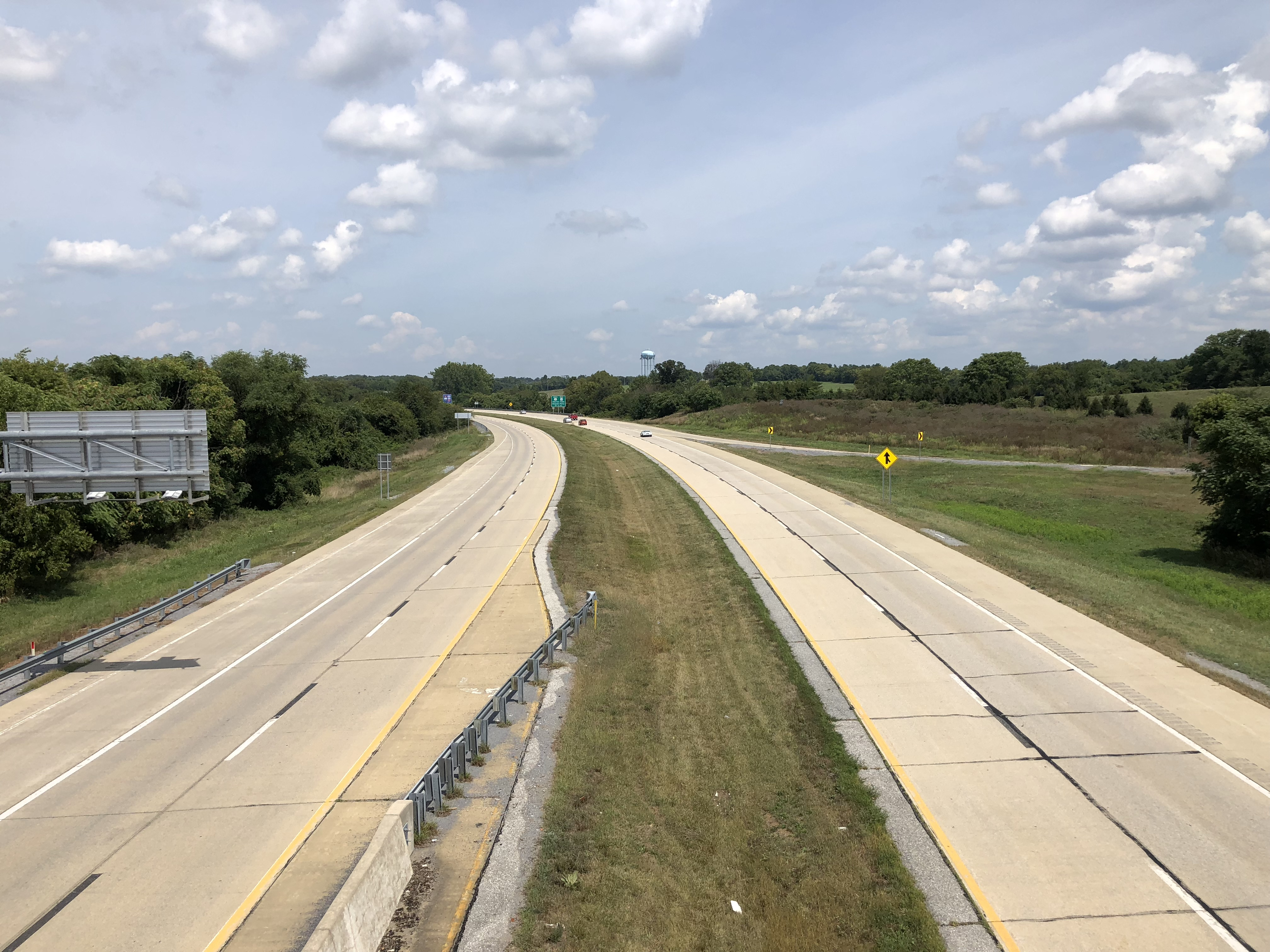
US 340 northbound and WV 9 westbound in Charles Town

At the north town limit of Berryville, US 340 expands to a four-lane divided highway at its diamond interchange with SR 7 (Harry Byrd Highway). The U.S. Highway passes to the north of the historic estate Fairfield at Gaylord, where the highway crosses over the Hagerstown District rail line for the last time. North of Gaylord, US 340 drops to two lanes and enters Jefferson County, West Virginia. The highway, named Berryville Pike, passes by Ripon Lodge in Rippon and near the William Grubb Farm near Wheatland. North of Wheatland, US 340 expands to a four-lane divided highway, passes the historic farm Beverley and Washington High School, and enters the city of Charles Town at the North Fork of Bullskin Run. The U.S. Highway passes along the southern and eastern fringes of the city and has a partial interchange with WV 115, which heads toward downtown along George Street and east on Charles Town Road. US 340 next has a pair of interchanges with and runs concurrently with WV 9. The first interchange is a trumpet interchange with the portion of WV 9 that heads east toward Leesburg, Virginia. The second is a partial cloverleaf interchange that serves as the eastern terminus of WV 51 (Washington Street). WV 9 continues north on the bypass toward Martinsburg while US 340 exits to the east.

US 340 continues east along the William L. Wilson Freeway, a four-lane divided highway with traffic signals named for the William Lyne Wilson, a late 19th century Congressman from Charles Town. The U.S. Highway passes to the north of Rion Hall, crosses over CSX's Shenandoah Subdivision rail line, and meets the southern end of WV 230 (Shepherdstown Pike) at Halltown. Along the southern edge of the town of Bolivar, US 340 meets the western end of US 340 Alt. (Washington Street), which is the main street of Bolivar and Harpers Ferry, and the entrance to the visitors center of Harpers Ferry National Historical Park, which is next to the Allstadt House and Ordinary.

=== Harpers Ferry to Frederick ===
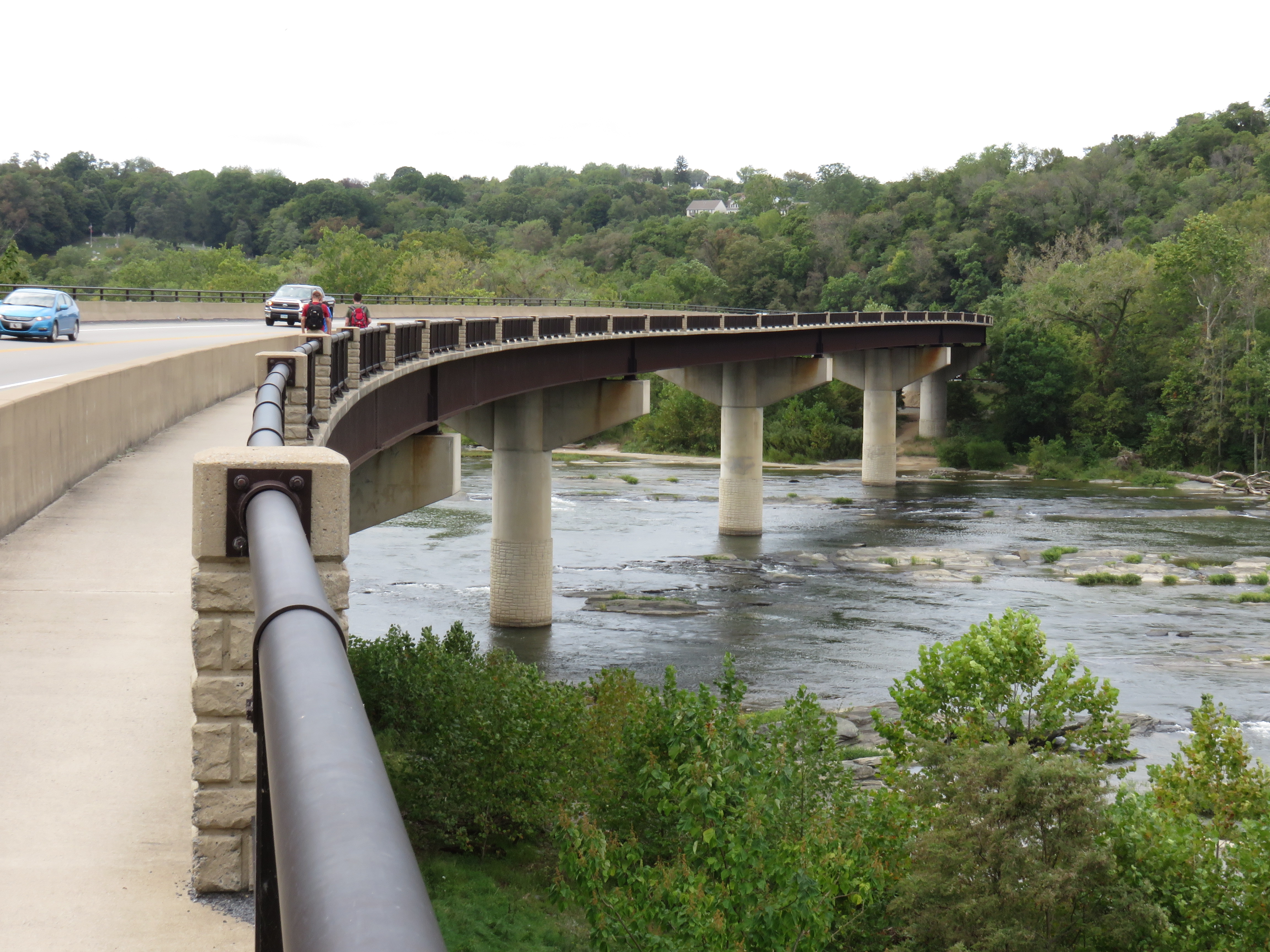
Bridge carrying US 340 over the Shenandoah River in Harpers Ferry, West Virginia. This bridge also carries the Appalachian Trail over the river.

US 340 reduces to two lanes and begins its traversal of the Potomac Water Gap, where that river passes through two ridges. The highway descends to and crosses over the Shenandoah Subdivision and the Shenandoah River, then it follows the east bank of the river to the river's confluence with the Potomac River. US 340 follows the south bank of the Potomac River as the river passes between Blue Ridge Mountain to the south and Elk Ridge, also known as Maryland Heights. At Blue Ridge Mountain, the U.S. Highway enters Loudoun County. US 340 has its sole intersection in its second run through Virginia with SR 671 (Harpers Ferry Road) in Loudoun Heights. The route then crosses the Potomac River into Washington County, Maryland, on a southwest–northeast angle on a two-lane steel continuous deck truss bridge that passes above Chesapeake and Ohio Canal National Historical Park, CSX's Cumberland Subdivision rail line, and Sandy Hook Road. US 340 expands to a four-lane freeway at the community of Sandy Hook, curves east through a trumpet interchange with MD 67 (Rohrersville Road), and crosses Israel Creek at Weverton. The highway, the canal, and the railroad parallel the Potomac River through the second ridge, which comprises South Mountain in Maryland and Short Hill Mountain in Virginia.

US 340's name changes to Jefferson National Pike as it enters Frederick County. The highway leaves the Potomac Water Gap and enters the Middletown Valley at its partial interchange with MD 180 (Jefferson Pike) at Knoxville; there is no access from westbound US 340 to eastbound MD 180 or from westbound MD 180 to eastbound US 340. The U.S. highway meets MD 17 (Burkittsville Road) at a diamond interchange near Rosemont and crosses Little Catoctin Creek. East of Petersville, US 340 has a diamond interchange with MD 180 and crosses Catoctin Creek. On the western edge of Jefferson, westbound US 340 receives a ramp from MD 180. Full access to Jefferson is provided by a diamond interchange with Lander Road. The U.S. highway passes through a wide gap in Catoctin Mountain and has a partial interchange with US 15 (Catoctin Mountain Highway), which heads south toward Point of Rocks. Access from northbound US 15 to westbound US 340 and from eastbound US 340 to southbound US 15 is provided through performing a U-turn at the concurrent highways' next interchange, a diamond interchange with Mt. Zion Road.

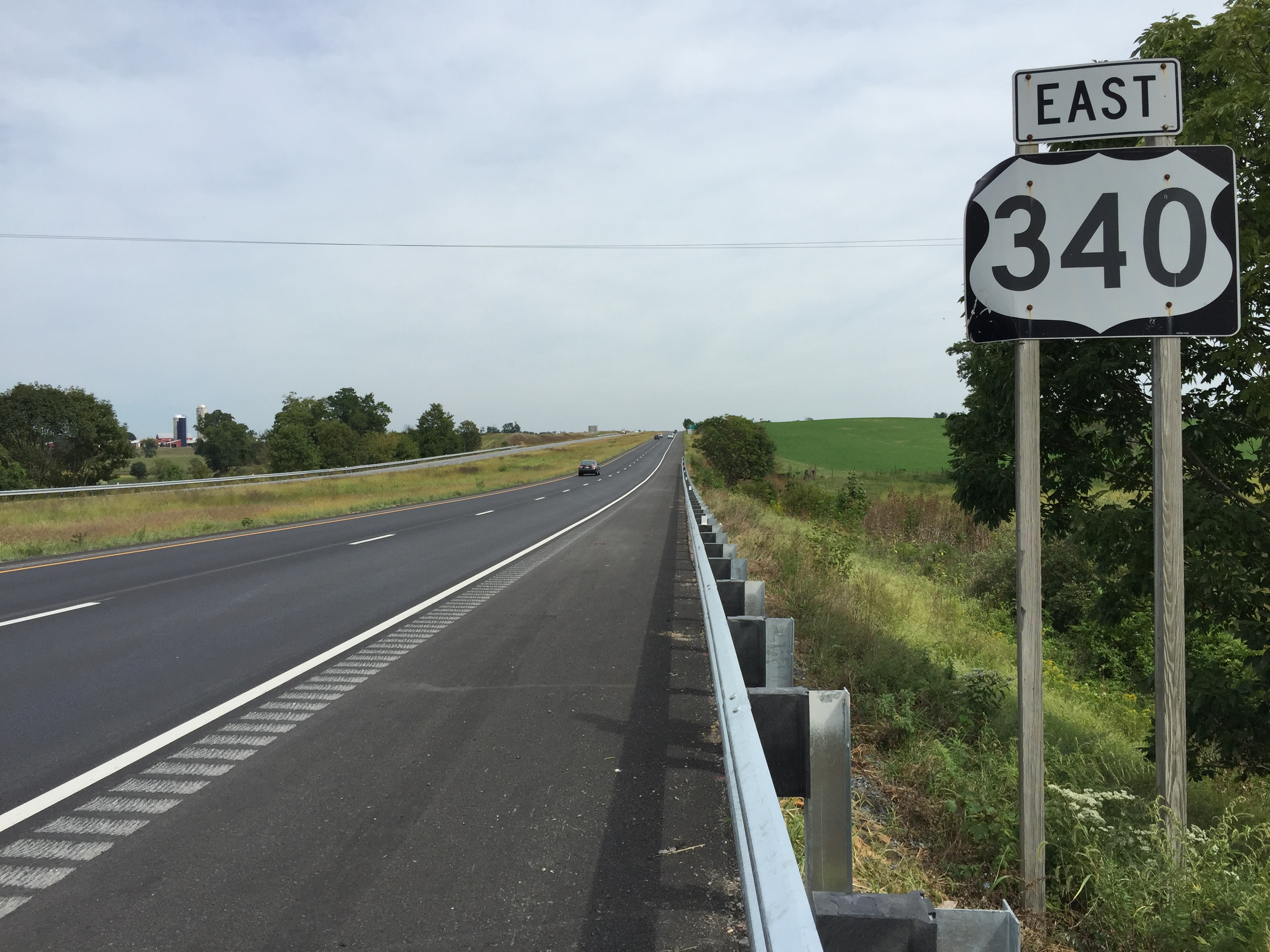
View east along US 340 past MD 17 near Rosemont, Maryland

US 340 and US 15 cross over Ballenger Creek before reaching a diamond interchange with Jefferson Technology Parkway, which is unsigned MD 872G. The highway's partial interchange with I-70 (Eisenhower Memorial Highway) features ramps from eastbound I-70 to both directions of US 340, a ramp from westbound I-70 to westbound US 340, and a ramp from eastbound US 340 to eastbound I-70 and access to southbound I-270 just to the east. Immediately to the northeast, US 340 and US 15 have a four-loop-ramp interchange with MD 180, which heads west as Jefferson Pike and south briefly as Ballenger Creek Pike. US 340 reaches its eastern terminus at the third interchange, which is a partial cloverleaf interchange with the Frederick Freeway. The first ramp from eastbound US 340 provides access to westbound I-70; the second ramp leads to the northbound Frederick Freeway (US 40), onto which US 15 exits. The ramps from westbound US 340 provide full access to I-70, I-270, US 15, and US 40. The roadway continues northeast as Jefferson Street, which reduces to a two-lane undivided street that heads toward an intersection with MD 144 (South Street eastbound and Patrick Street westbound) just west of downtown Frederick. The portion of Jefferson Street between the overpass of US 40 and just west of Jefferson Street's intersection with Pearl Street is unsigned US 15B.

== History ==
In Maryland, US 340 follows the corridor of the old road from Frederick to Harpers Ferry, part of which was organized as the Frederick and Jefferson Turnpike between the two towns. This highway became one of the original state roads marked for improvement by the Maryland State Roads Commission in 1909. The commission purchased the right-of-way of the turnpike in 1911 and resurfaced the Frederick–Jefferson highway with a 14-foot (4.3 m) wide macadam surface in 1915. The segments from Jefferson to Petersville and from Petersville to Knoxville were placed under construction in 1911 and completed as a 14-foot (4.3 m) macadam road in 1912. The highway from Knoxville to the Potomac River opposite Harpers Ferry was completed as a concrete road in 1919. The Frederick–Knoxville highway was widened to 17-foot (5.2 m) in width around 1926 and became part of US 340 in 1927. US 340 was widened again, this time to 20 feet (6.1 m) between Frederick and Knoxville, by 1934.

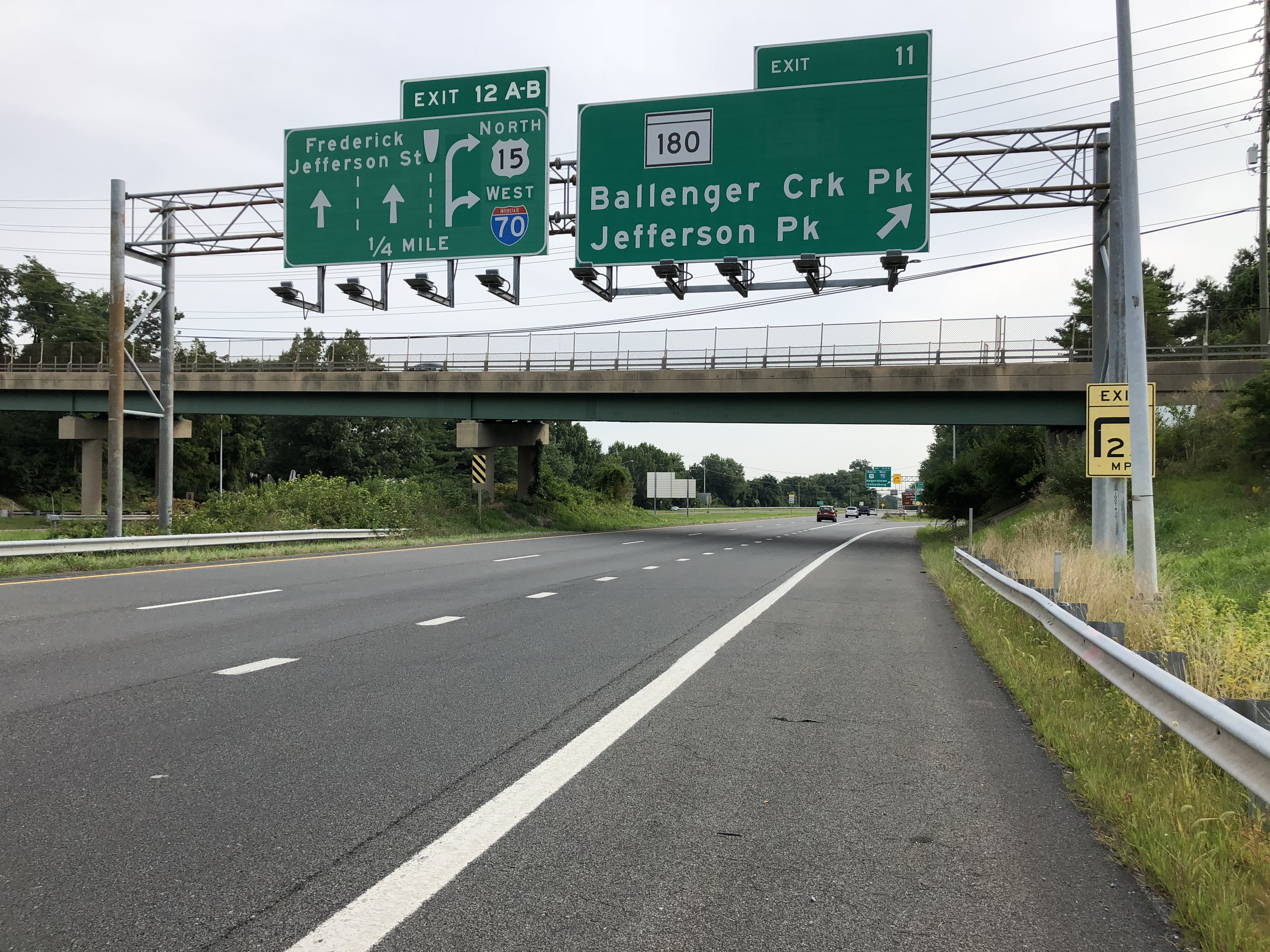
US 15/US 340 northbound at the MD 180 exit in Frederick

US 340 was widened and resurfaced with bituminous concrete from Knoxville to the approach to new bridge at Sandy Hook in 1948. In conjunction with the construction of the Frederick Freeway, US 340's cloverleaf interchange with US 40 was built in 1954 and 1955. Jefferson Street in Frederick was widened in 1956. When US 40 was moved from Patrick Street to the Frederick Freeway in 1959, US 340's eastern terminus was moved from Patrick Street west to the new interchange. Construction on the US 340 freeway began when the highway's bridge across Catoctin Creek was built in 1961. This bridge came into use in 1964 when the freeway segment between the MD 180 interchange east of Petersville and the ramp from MD 180 west of Jefferson was opened, replacing the curvaceous old alignment at Catoctin Creek. The present alignment of US 340 opened as a four-lane divided highway from the Valley Road / Keep Tryst Road intersection in Sandy Hook east to Weverton also opened that year. The portion of the freeway between Weverton and MD 180 east of Petersville was under construction in 1964 and completed in 1965. MD 180 was assigned to old US 340 from Sandy Hook to west of Jefferson in 1965.

Construction on the US 340 freeway east toward Frederick began in 1966. The freeway east to the current Point of Rocks – Jefferson segment of US 15 was completed in 1967; however, the US 15 interchange would not become operational until the new US 15 was completed and the two U.S. highways became concurrent in 1970. US 340's interchanges with I-70 and MD 180 were completed in 1968 and the portion of the freeway from the US 15 interchange east to MD 180 opened in 1969. At that time, MD 180 was extended east over the old Jefferson–Frederick section of US 340. US 340's interchanges with MD 67 in Weverton and Mt. Zion Road near Frederick opened in 1971 and 1972, respectively. Several ramps were added to improve access between US 340 and I-70 in 1997, including a pair of ramps from eastbound I-70 to US 340 and the connection from northbound US 340 to westbound I-70 at US 340's northern terminus. The interchange at US 340's northern terminus was converted from a cloverleaf interchange to a partial cloverleaf interchange with traffic signals in 2004.

The park and ride lot at the interchange of US 340 and Mount Zion Road was expanded and moved nearby, opening on August 29, 2022.

On September 12, 2023, the West Virginia Department of Transportation broke ground on a $13.3 million project to reduce rockslides on US 340 between Cheshunt Hill Road and Harpers Ferry Road after a risk of further deterioration. Additional improvements were made along Cheshunt Hill Road. This was completed on December 1, 2023.

=== Sandy Hook Bridge ===
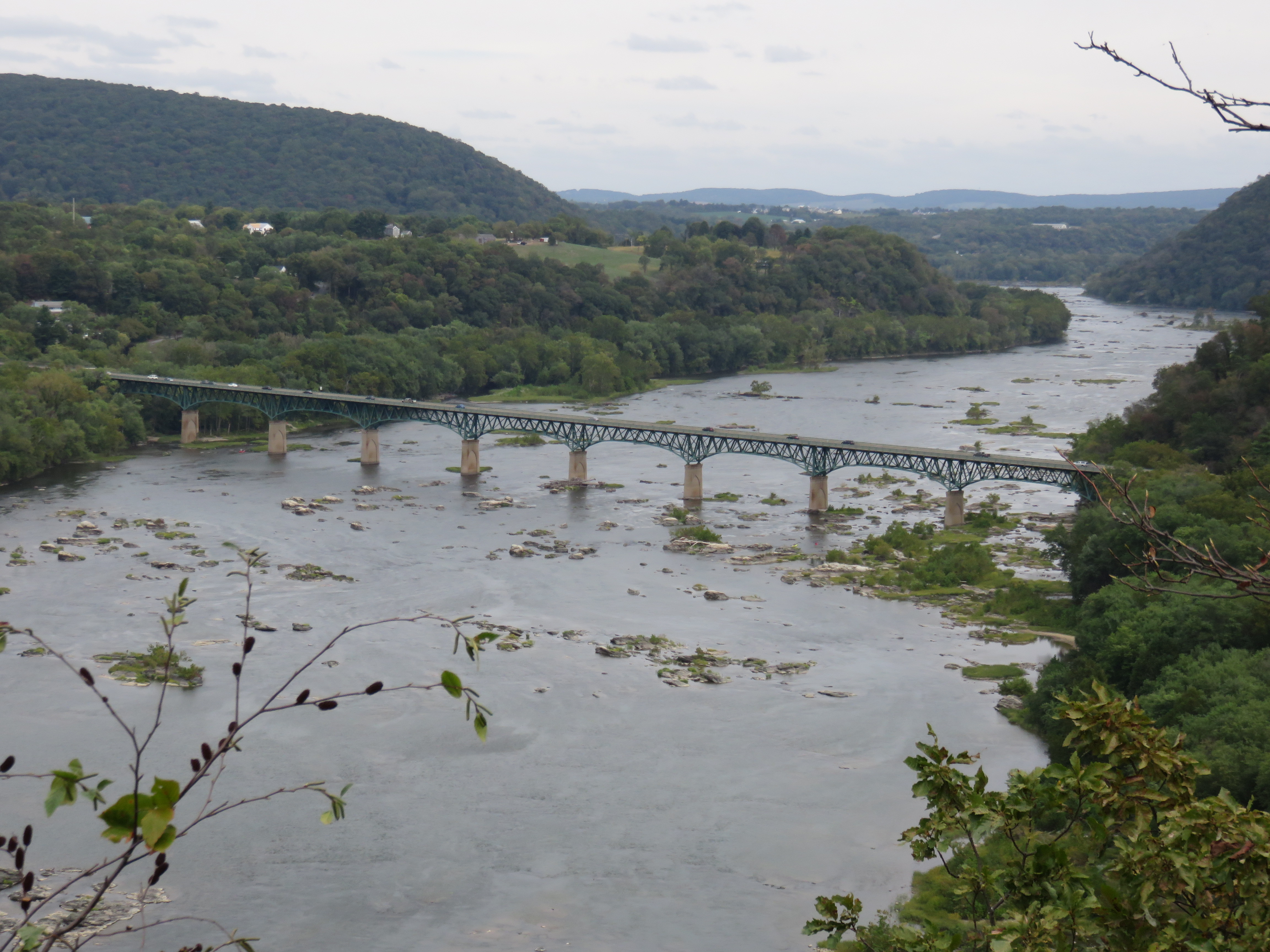
US 340 crosses the Potomac River over the Sandy Hook Bridge, on the Maryland–Virginia border

US 340 originally followed Sandy Hook Road south and west from what is now Keep Tryst Road in Sandy Hook and paralleled the Potomac River west to Maryland Heights directly across the river from downtown Harpers Ferry. There, the U.S. highway crossed the river on a converted railroad bridge immediately upstream from the confluence of the Potomac and Shenandoah rivers and downstream from the two railroad bridges—one for CSX's Cumberland Subdivision on the north and the other for the Shenandoah Subdivision—that presently cross the river at the site. After the highway bridge was destroyed in the March 1936 flood, a wooden floor was placed on the Shenandoah Subdivision bridge for that bridge to temporarily serve both rail and automobile traffic. Later in 1936, Maryland and West Virginia acquired the right-of-way of the destroyed toll bridge owned by the Harpers Ferry and Potomac Bridge Company by eminent domain with an aim to build a new bridge at the site.

In August 1939, Maryland, West Virginia, and Virginia decided to instead embark on a tri-state road and bridge program to replace the destroyed bridge. Plans for bridges across the Potomac and Shenandoah rivers and connecting highways were completed in August 1940. The new bridge across the Potomac river was to be placed at Sandy Hook to exploit the scenic views of the Potomac Water Gap. However, in December 1940, construction was delayed and plans needed to be modified to eliminate a sharp turn at the Virginia landing of the bridge. Despite a late request from the Virginia State Highway Department to move the Potomac River crossing upstream in June 1941, the concrete substructure of the Sandy Hook bridge was started in autumn 1941. The substructure was completed in March 1943. A request for bids for the Sandy Hook bridge's steel superstructure was advertised in November 1941. However, with the U.S. entering into World War II the following month, the construction of the superstructure of the bridge would be delayed until after the war due to the unavailability of steel.

The Maryland State Roads Commission advertised for bids for the Sandy Hook bridge's superstructure in December 1945. Construction started shortly thereafter and the superstructure was completed in January 1947. The Maryland and Virginia approach roads were completed later in 1947 and the bridge officially opened October 19, 1947. Although the residents of Harpers Ferry lobbied for an on-site replacement of the bridge over the Shenandoah River at Harpers Ferry so US 340 would continue to pass directly through the historic town, the West Virginia State Road Commission completed a new roadway and a new Shenandoah River crossing along US 340's present alignment in 1949. US 340 was rerouted onto its present course over the two new bridges by 1950.

== Future ==
Construction had begun to expand the West Virginia portion of the road between the Virginia state line and Wheatland, which is south of Charles Town, West Virginia. This will convert the highway into four lanes. The highway is being realigned near the town of Rippon, which will impact many homes and businesses. Road name and address changes will happen in the area. This project was planned to be completed in 2025.

The two-lane portion of the highway between Harpers Ferry, West Virginia, and the Virginia state line is often burdened by heavy traffic, and the West Virginia Department of Transportation is examining ways to mitigate backups.

An interchange has been planned for the future section of Monocacy Boulevard within the planned Jefferson Tech Park in Frederick, Maryland.

== Major intersections ==
US 340 is signed north–south from US 11 in Greenville, VA, to the Virginia-Maryland state line and east–west from the Virginia-Maryland state line to US 15/US 40/Jefferson St in Frederick, MD.

State	County	Location	mi	km	Exit	Destinations	Notes
Virginia	Augusta	Greenville	0.00	0.00		US 11 (Lee Highway) to I-64 / I-81 – Greenville, Staunton, Lexington, Roanoke	Southern terminus
Virginia	City of Waynesboro		12.14	19.54		I-64 – Staunton, Richmond	I-64 exit 94
Virginia	City of Waynesboro		14.58	23.46		US 250 / US 340 Truck north (Main Street / Broad Street)	
Virginia	City of Waynesboro		14.76	23.75		SR 254 west (Poplar Avenue)	
Virginia	City of Waynesboro		15.84	25.49		US 250 west / US 340 Truck south (Broad Street)	Southern end of US 250 concurrency
Virginia	City of Waynesboro		16.03	25.80		US 250 east (East Main Street) to Delphine Avenue / I-64	Northern end of US 250 concurrency
Virginia	Augusta	No major junctions					
Virginia	Rockingham	Grottoes	30.49	49.07		SR 256 west (3rd Street) to I-81 – Weyers Cave, Airport, Grand Caverns	
Virginia	Rockingham		32.35	52.06		SR 253 west / SR 659 (Port Republic Road) – Port Republic, Harrisonburg	
Virginia	Rockingham	Elkton	46.50	74.83		US 33 – Harrisonburg, Richmond	Southern end of US 33 Bus. concurrency; interchange
Virginia	Rockingham	Elkton	46.58	74.96		US 33 Bus. west (Spotswood Trail) / SR 1711 (Blue and Gold Drive) – Downtown Elkton, Harrisonburg	Northern end of US 33 Bus. concurrency
Virginia	Page		60.44	97.27		US 340 Bus. north – Stanley	
Virginia	Page	Intersections	63.60	102.35		US 211 west – New Market	Southern end of US 211 concurrency
Virginia	Page	Luray	69.42	111.72		US 211 Bus. east (West Main Street) – Luray Business District	
Virginia	Page	Luray	71.20	114.59		US 211 east / US 340 Bus. south (North Broad Street) – Washington, Skyline Drive, Luray, Stanley, Historic District	Northern end of US 211 concurrency; interchange
Virginia	Warren		94.00	151.28		Skyline Drive – Shenandoah National Park	
Virginia	Warren	Front Royal	94.31	151.78		SR 55 east (South Street) to US 522	Southern end of SR 55 concurrency
Virginia	Warren	Front Royal	95.53	153.74		US 522 south (North Commerce Avenue)	Southern end of US 522 concurrency
Virginia	Warren	Front Royal	96.93	155.99		SR 55 west (Strasburg Road) – Strasburg	Northern end of SR 55 concurrency
Virginia	Warren		97.98	157.68		I-66 to I-81 – Strasburg, Washington	I-66 exit 6
Virginia	Clarke	Double Tollgate	105.54	169.85		US 522 north (Stonewall Jackson Highway) / SR 277 west (Lord Fairfax Highway) – Winchester, Stephens City	Northern end of US 522 concurrency
Virginia	Clarke	Waterloo	109.46	176.16		US 17 / US 50 (John Mosby Highway) – Winchester, Washington, State Arboretum of Virginia	
Virginia	Clarke	Briggs	113.73	183.03		SR 255 south (Bishop Meade Road) – Millwood	
Virginia	Clarke	Berryville	117.23	188.66		SR 7 Bus. (Main Street) – Winchester, Washington	
Virginia	Clarke		117.92	189.77		SR 7 (Harry Byrd Highway) – Winchester, Alexandria	Interchange
			122.03 0.00	196.39 0.00	Virginia–West Virginia state line		
West Virginia	Jefferson	Charles Town	7.23	11.64		WV 115 (Charles Town Road) – Charles Town, Leesburg, VA	Interchange
West Virginia	Jefferson	Charles Town	7.91	12.73		WV 9 east – Leesburg, VA	Southern end of WV 9 concurrency; interchange
West Virginia	Jefferson	Charles Town	9.09	14.63		WV 9 west / WV 51 west (East Washington Street) – Martinsburg, Charles Town	Northern end of WV 9 concurrency; eastern terminus of WV 51; interchange
West Virginia	Jefferson	Halltown	12.04	19.38		WV 230 north – Halltown, Shepherdstown	Southern terminus of WV 230
West Virginia	Jefferson	Bolivar	13.76	22.14		US 340 Alt. east (Washington Street) – Harpers Ferry	
			16.03 0.00	25.80 0.00	West Virginia–Virginia state line		
Virginia	Loudoun					SR 671 south (Harpers Ferry Road)	Northern terminus of SR 671
Potomac River			0.57 0.00	0.92 0.00	Virginia–Maryland state line; sign change from north-south to east-west		
Maryland	Washington	Weverton			Western end of freeway section		
Maryland	Washington	Weverton	1.56	2.51		MD 67 north (Rohrersville Road) – Boonsboro	Trumpet interchange
Maryland	Frederick	Knoxville	2.53	4.07		MD 180 east (Jefferson Pike) to MD 478 – Knoxville, Brunswick	Eastbound exit and westbound left entrance
Maryland	Frederick		4.39	7.07		MD 17 (Burkittsville Road) – Brunswick, Burkittsville	
Maryland	Frederick		7.77	12.50		MD 180 (Jefferson Pike) – Petersville	
Maryland	Frederick	Jefferson	8.97	14.44		MD 180	Westbound entrance only
Maryland	Frederick	Jefferson	10.57	17.01		Lander Road – Jefferson	
Maryland	Frederick		12.30	19.79		US 15 south – Leesburg	Western end of US 15 concurrency; westbound left exit and eastbound entrance
Maryland	Frederick	Frederick	13.92	22.40		Mount Zion Road	
Maryland	Frederick	Frederick	15.58	25.07	9	Jefferson Technology Parkway (MD 872G)	
Maryland	Frederick	Frederick	16.38	26.36	10	I-70 east to I-270 south – Baltimore, Washington	Eastbound exit and westbound entrance; I-70 exit 52
Maryland	Frederick	Frederick	16.62	26.75	11	MD 180 west (Jefferson Pike) / Ballenger Creek Pike	Exit number not signed westbound
Maryland	Frederick	Frederick	17.01	27.37	12	US 15 north / US 40 west to I-70 west – Hagerstown, Gettysburg	Eastbound exit and westbound entrance; eastern end of US 15 concurrency; signed as exits 12A (I-70) and 12B (US 15/US 40)
Maryland	Frederick	Frederick	17.01	27.37		Jefferson Street	Continuation east
1.000 mi = 1.609 km; 1.000 km = 0.621 mi: Concurrency terminus; Incomplete access

== Special routes ==
=== Virginia truck route ===
U.S. Route 340 Truck
- Location: Waynesboro
- Length: 1.35 mi (2.17 km)

U.S. Route 340 Truck (US 340 Truck) is a truck route of US 340 in the city of Waynesboro, Virginia. The route follows US 250/Broad Street through downtown. The route was formed in the 1990s.

=== Virginia business route ===
U.S. Route 340 Business
- Location: Alma–Luray
- Length: 12.69 mi (20.42 km)

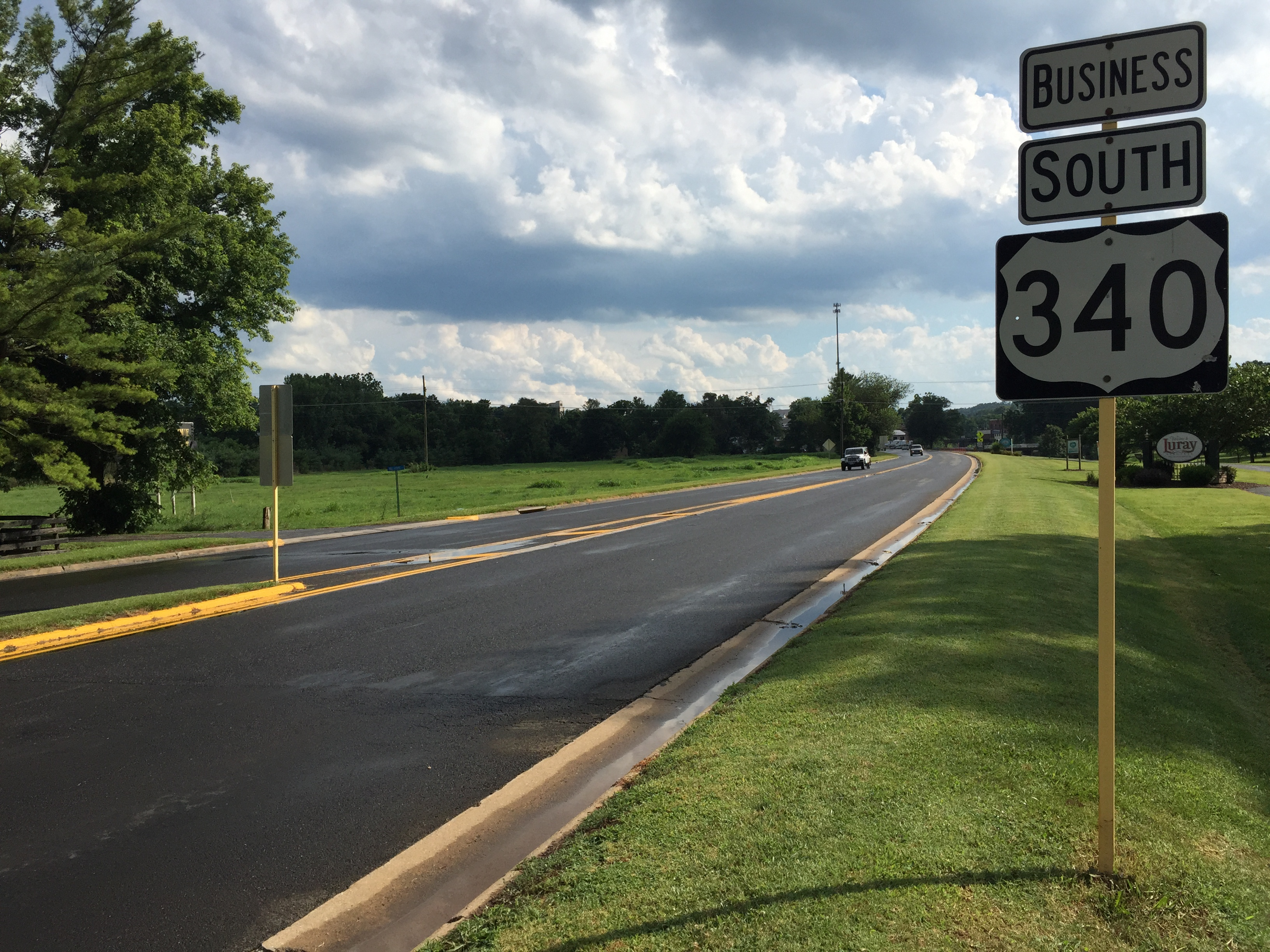
View south along US 340 Bus. in Luray

U.S. Route 340 Business (US 340 Bus.) is a business route of US 340 in Page County, Virginia.

=== West Virginia alternate route ===
U.S. Route 340 Alternate
- Location: Bolivar–Harpers Ferry
- Length: 1.83 mi (2.95 km)

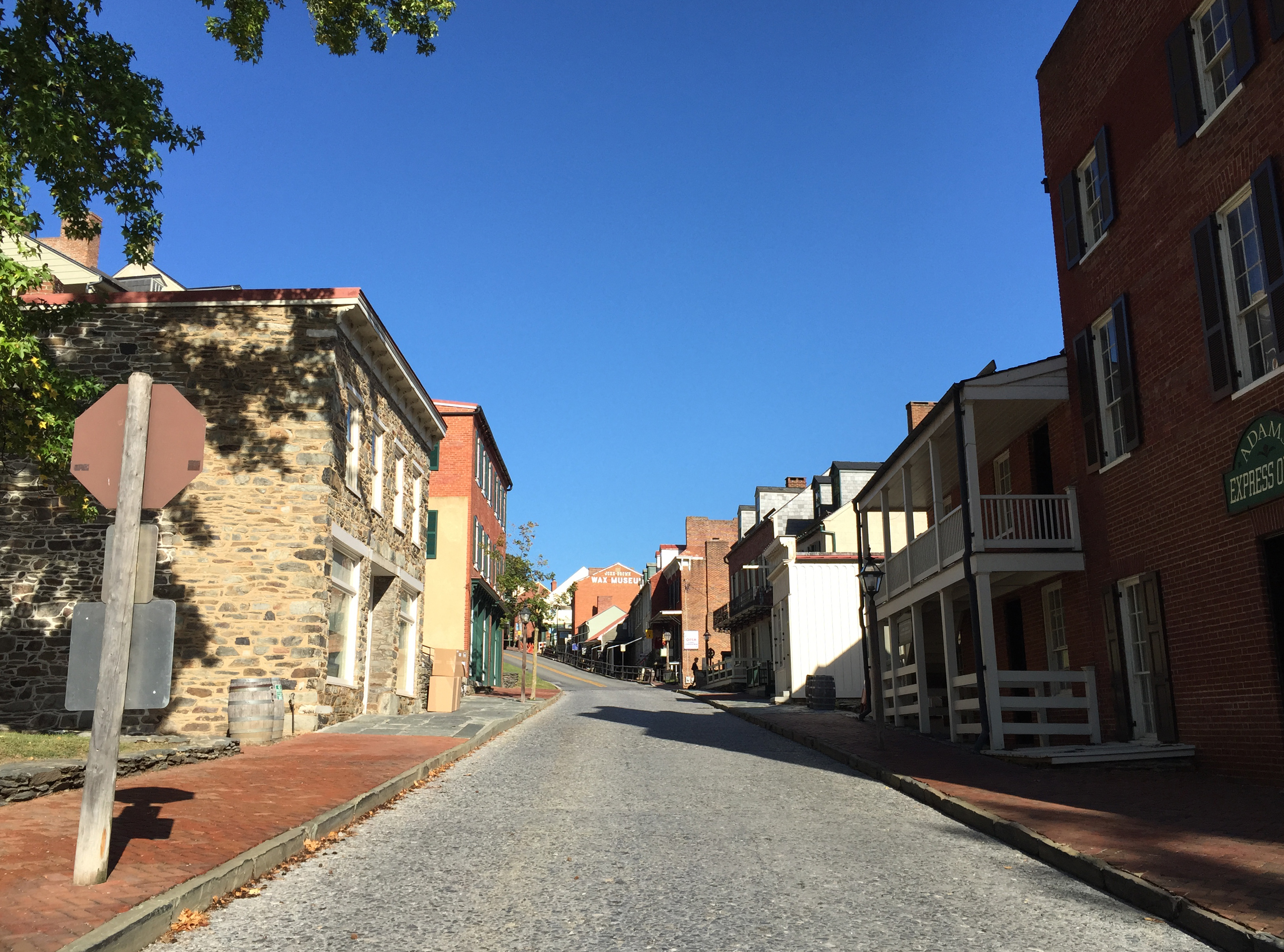
View along US 340 Alt. in Harpers Ferry

U.S. Route 340 Alternate (US 340 Alt.) is an unsigned alternate route of US 340. It is a spur following Washington Street and High Street through the towns of Bolivar and Harpers Ferry.
