= U.S. Route 220 in Virginia =

Segment of American highway

U.S. Route 220
- US 220 highlighted in red

Route information
- Maintained by VDOT
- Length: 185.96 mi (299.27 km)
- Existed: 1935–present

Major junctions
- South end: US 220 at the North Carolina state line near Ridgeway
- US 58 near Martinsville; US 11 / US 460 in Roanoke; I-81 / US 220 Alt. near Roanoke; I-64 / US 60 near Clifton Forge; US 250 in Monterey
- North end: US 220 at the West Virginia state line in Forks of Waters

Location
- Country: United States
- State: Virginia
- Counties: Henry, Franklin, Roanoke, City of Roanoke, Botetourt, Alleghany, City of Covington, Bath, Highland

Highway system
- United States Numbered Highway System; List; Special; Divided; Virginia Routes; Interstate; US; Primary; Secondary; Byways; History; HOT lanes
← US 219	→ US 221

In the U.S. state of Virginia, U.S. Route 220 (US 220) is a major north–south state highway that extends from the North Carolina state line through Roanoke to the West Virginia state line. South of Roanoke, US 220 is a four-lane highway within the proposed Interstate 73 (I-73) corridor. US 220 narrows to two lanes north of Roanoke, connecting to I-64 near Clifton Forge and then paralleling the Appalachian Mountains north-northeasterly in the direction of Cumberland, Maryland.

== Route description ==
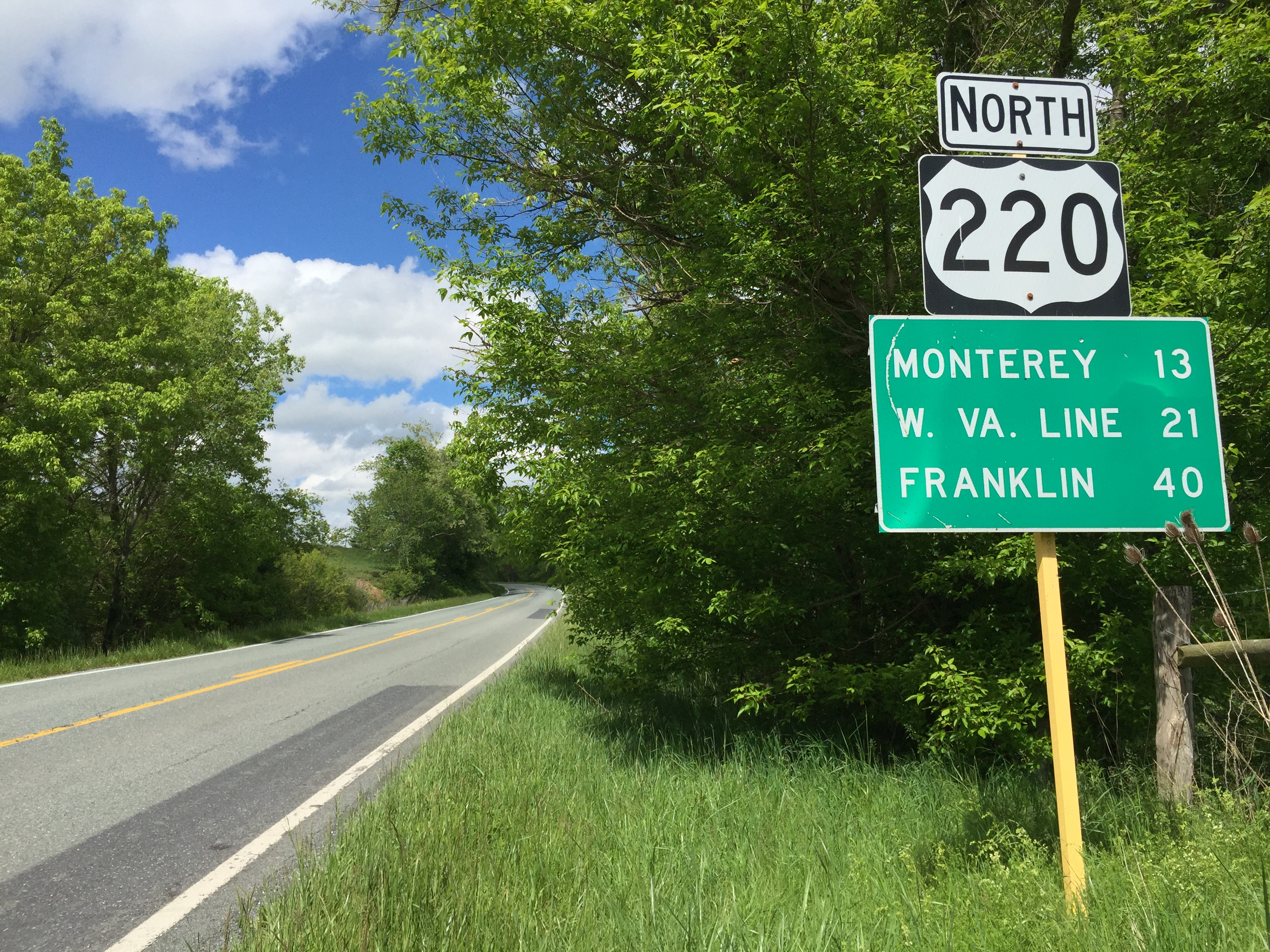
View north along US 220 in Highland County

US 220 enters Virginia just north of the community of Price, North Carolina. From the state line to Roanoke, US 220 is a four-lane mix of freeway bypasses and 55 miles per hour (89 km/h) at-grade rural highway. Some high traffic areas and non-divided stretches have speed limits of 45 miles per hour (72 km/h) or lower. In particular, the stretch through Boones Mill is not divided; the town is also well known as a speed trap. This segment follows the same general alignment as the Norfolk Southern Railway's Winston-Salem District, opened in 1892 by the Roanoke and Southern Railway.

US 220 meets the northern terminus of State Route 87 in Ridgeway, and soon after turns west to bypass the city of Martinsville on a freeway partially shared with US 58. Another bypass takes the highway around the town of Rocky Mount, after which US 220 crosses the Blue Ridge Parkway at Murray Gap. Soon after entering the city of Roanoke, US 220 intersects SR 419 and again becomes a freeway, this one passing just east of downtown Roanoke and becoming Interstate 581 northwest to Interstate 81.

US 220 overlaps I-81 northeast to near Daleville, where it exits to the north onto a four-lane road through Daleville and Fincastle. At Eagle Rock, the road narrows to two lanes and begins to parallel the James River. US 220 loosely follows the James River and its major tributary, the Jackson River, north to near Clifton Forge, where it begins to overlap Interstate 64 and US 60 west, still following the Jackson River, to Covington. Also paralleling these rivers are CSX Transportation's Alleghany Subdivision and James River Subdivision, opened in 1867 and 1881 respectively by the Virginia Central Railroad and Richmond and Alleghany Railroad.

US 220 is a two-lane road for the rest of its route from Covington to West Virginia, as it travels through a series of valleys in the Ridge-and-Valley Appalachians. It begins by following more of the Jackson River to near Clearwater Park, but then crosses a ridge into a different valley. This is repeated several times until Forks of Waters, where the South Branch Potomac River enters US 220's valley and parallels its final 1 mile (1.6 km) to the state line.

== History ==
Part of the Great Wagon Road branched off near what is present day Roanoke, Virginia, and U.S. Route 220 in Virginia now follows part of this section of the Carolina Road. "The route was improved as a stage road in the early years of the republic. In 1838 it was rebuilt to serve the Pittsylvania, Franklin and Botetourt Turnpike, which served to connect south central Virginia with the Valley."

As a U.S. Highway, US 220 was initially part of U.S. Route 311, which split from US 11 at Roanoke and ran south to Aberdeen, North Carolina. This was also part of State Route 33, one of Virginia's original state highways from 1918 (which was numbered 3 until 1923). Other than the US 60 overlap, two other segments date to 1918: part of SR 17 from Covington to Warm Springs, and part of SR 39 (originally 9) from Vanderpool to Monterey.

- Location: Troutville - Millboro Springs
- Existed: 1923–1926 (became SR 17)

Otherwise the gaps were filled starting in 1922, with the legislative designation of a spur of SR 14 from Clifton Forge south to Eagle Rock, which was numbered State Route 142 in 1923. 1924 saw the beginning of the extension of SR 142 southwest to US 11 at Troutville, and it was also extended along SR 14 east to Longdale Furnace and then north to Millboro Springs. In 1926 it became part of a realignment of SR 17, with that route's former routing to Covington becoming part of new State Route 338.

- Location: Warm Springs - West Virginia
- Existed: 1924–1928 (became SR 800)

State Route 12
- Location: Troutville - Clifton Forge
- Existed: 1933–1935 (became US 220)

The first piece of State Route 395, which ended up extending from Warm Springs to West Virginia, was also created in 1924 as a spur from SR 39 at Monterey. The entire Covington-West Virginia corridor (SR 395 and part of SR 338) became State Route 800 in 1928 (along with an extension southwest from Covington), and was renumbered State Route 18 in 1933. Also in 1933, the part of SR 17 south of Clifton Forge became State Route 12.

US 220 was extended into Virginia in 1935, replacing SR 18 north of Covington, all of SR 12, and all of US 311 in Virginia. US 311 has since been re-extended into the state west of Danville.

The modern US 220 corridor was added to the state highway system as follows:

Portion	Creation	Number	Notes
North Carolina to Roanoke	1918	SR 3 (1918–1923) → SR 33 (1923–1933) → US 311 (1926–1935)	
Roanoke to Troutville	1918	SR 3 (1918–1923) → SR 33 (1923–1933) → US 11 (1926–present)	US 11 overlap
Troutville to Eagle Rock	1924-1926	SR 142 (1924–1926) → SR 17 (1926–1933) → SR 12 (1933–1935)	Troutville bypassed in 1935; former alignment renumbered SR 294
Eagle Rock to Clifton Forge	1922	spur of SR 14 (1922–1923) → SR 142 (1923–1926) → SR 17 (1926–1933) → SR 12 (1933–1935)	
Clifton Forge to Covington	1918	SR 14 (1918–1933) → US 60 (1926–present)	US 60 overlap
Covington to Warm Springs	1918	SR 17 (1918–1926) → SR 338 (1926–1928) → SR 800 (1928–1933) → SR 18 (1933–1935)	
Warm Springs to Vanderpool	1927-1928	SR 395 (1927–1928) → SR 800 (1928–1933) → SR 18 (1933–1935)	
Vanderpool to Monterey	1918	SR 9 (1918–1923) → SR 39 (1923–1933) and SR 395 (1927–1928) → SR 800 (1928–1933) → SR 18 (1933–1935)	route not finalized until 1923
Monterey to West Virginia	1924-1926	SR 395 (1924–1928) → SR 800 (1928–1933) → SR 18 (1933–1935)	

== Major intersections ==
County	Location	mi	km	Destinations	Notes
Henry				US 220 south – Greensboro	North Carolina state line, Future I-73
Henry				US 220 Bus. north (Church Street) / SR 688 (Lee Ford Camp Road)	
Henry	Ridgeway			SR 87 south (Morehead Avenue) – Ridgeway, Eden, NC	
Henry	Ridgeway			US 220 Bus. south (Main Street) / SR 687 (Soapstone Road)	
Henry				US 58 east (Greensboro Road) / US 220 Bus. north – Martinsville, Danville, Speedway	interchange; south end of freeway; south end of US 58 overlap
Henry				SR 641 (Joseph Martin Highway)	
Henry				US 58 west / US 58 Bus. east – Stuart, Martinsville	north end of US 58 overlap
Henry				SR 609 – Fieldale	
Henry				SR 57A west / SR 682 – Fieldale, Bassett	
Henry				SR 57 east – Fieldale	southbound exit and northbound entrance; south end of SR 57 overlap
Henry	Bassett Forks			US 220 Bus. south / SR 57 west – Stanleytown, Bassett, Collinsville, Martinsville	interchange; north end of freeway; north end of SR 57 overlap
Franklin	Henry Fork			US 220 Bus. north / SR 674 – Rocky Mount	interchange; south end of freeway
Franklin	Rocky Mount			SR 40 to SR 122 – Rocky Mount, Gretna	
Franklin	Rocky Mount			US 220 Bus. south – Rocky Mount	interchange; north end of freeway
Franklin	Boones Mill			SR 739 (Bethlehem Road)	former SR 120 south
Roanoke				Blue Ridge Parkway – Explore Park	interchange
City of Roanoke				US 220 Bus. north (Franklin Road) / SR 419 north – Salem	interchange; south end of freeway
City of Roanoke				Wonju Street / Colonial Avenue / to Franklin Road	no access from US 220 north to Wonju Street south
City of Roanoke				US 220 Bus. north (Franklin Road)	northbound exit and southbound entrance
City of Roanoke				SR 24 (Elm Avenue) – Vinton I-581 begins	south end of I-581 overlap; I-581 exit 6
see I-581
Roanoke				I-81 south – Salem, Bristol I-581 ends	north end of I-581 overlap; south end of I-81 overlap; I-81 exit 143; I-581 exit 1S
Roanoke				SR 115 – Hollins, Cloverdale, Roanoke	I-81 exit 146
Botetourt				I-81 north / US 11 (Lee Highway) / US 220 Alt. south (Cloverdale Road) to US 460 – Lexington, Staunton, Troutville, Cloverdale, Roanoke, Lynchburg	north end of I-81 overlap; north end of freeway; I-81 exit 150B
Botetourt	Daleville			SR 779 (Catawba Road) – Catawba	former SR 114 west
Botetourt	Trinity			SR 670 (Trinity Road)	former SR 294 south
Botetourt				SR 870 (James Street) to SR 43 – Eagle Rock	former SR 43Y
Botetourt	Bessemer			SR 615 (Craig Creek Road)	former SR 43 north
Botetourt				SR 43 south (Narrow Passage Road) – Eagle Rock, Buchanan	
Alleghany				US 220 Bus. north (Verge Street)	
Alleghany				US 60 Bus. west – Clifton Forge	interchange; south end of US 60 Bus. overlap
Alleghany	Cliftondale Park			I-64 east / US 60 east / SR 629 – Lexington, Douthat State Park	north end of US 60 Bus. overlap; south end of I-64 / US 60 overlap; US 220 south follows exit 27
Alleghany	Selma			US 60 Bus. east / US 220 Bus. south – Clifton Forge	I-64 exit 24
Alleghany	Low Moor			SR 696 – Low Moor	I-64 exit 21
Alleghany	Mallow			I-64 west – White Sulphur Springs	north end of I-64 overlap; US 220 north follows exit 16A
City of Covington				SR 18 south (Carpenter Drive)	
City of Covington				US 60 west (South Monroe Avenue)	north end of US 60 overlap
City of Covington				Hickory Street (SR 154 south)	
Alleghany				SR 687 (Jackson River Road) – Falling Spring, Gathright Dam, Lake Moomaw	former SR 268 north
Bath	Warm Springs			SR 39 west (Mountain Valley Road) – Marlinton, WV	south end of SR 39 overlap
Bath	Warm Springs			SR 39 east (Mountain Valley Road) – Goshen, Lexington	north end of SR 39 overlap
Highland	Vanderpool			SR 84 west (Mill Gap Road) – Frost, WV	
Highland	Monterey			US 250 (Main Street) – Elkins, WV, Staunton	
Highland	Forks of Waters			SR 642 (Blue Grass Valley Road) – Blue Grass	former SR 284 west
Highland				US 220 north – Franklin	West Virginia state line
1.000 mi = 1.609 km; 1.000 km = 0.621 mi: Concurrency terminus; Incomplete access

== See also ==
- Special routes of U.S. Route 220

U.S. Route 220
Previous state: North Carolina	Virginia	Next state: West Virginia
