= Virginia State Route 258 =

The following highways in Virginia have been known as State Route 258:

- State Route 258 (Virginia 1933-1940), Grove Hill to Alma
- State Route 258, 1940 – mid-1940s, now part of U.S. Route 258
- U.S. Route 258, 1940–present
