= Bacova Junction, Virginia =

Unincorporated community in Virginia, United States

Bacova Junction
- Unincorporated community
- Location within the U.S. state of Virginia Bacova Junction (the United States)
- Coordinates: 38°00′37″N 79°52′28″W
- Country: United States
- State: Virginia
- County: Bath
- Time zone: UTC−5 (Eastern (EST))
  - Summer (DST): UTC−4 (EDT)
- ZIP codes: 24445

Bacova Junction is an unincorporated community in Bath County, Virginia, United States. Bacova Junction is situated 2.9 miles (4.7 km) west of Hot Springs, and state routes 615 and 687 converge in the community. Historically, Bacova Junction was known for its timber industry.

== History ==
Bacova Junction was known historically as Grose. Grose house, known as Thornhill House, still exists and is situated at Queen Springs, along Cowardin Run, near the community. The Warwickton plantation was built by Judge James Woods Warwick in the 1850s. The house was restored by Ron and Pam Stidham in the 1890s.

== Geography ==
Bacova Junction is situated 74.2 miles (119.4 km) southeast of Harrisonburg, 2.9 miles (4.7 km) west of Hot Springs and 3.1 miles (5.0 km) north of Callison. Virginia State Route 615 and Virginia State Route 687 converge at the community. The community lies at an altitude of 550 metres (1,800 ft).

== Economy ==
Bacova Junction lay along the Chesapeake and Ohio Railway and was known for its timber production, with over 30,000 acres in the vicinity.
