= Wheatland, West Virginia =

- Unincorporated community
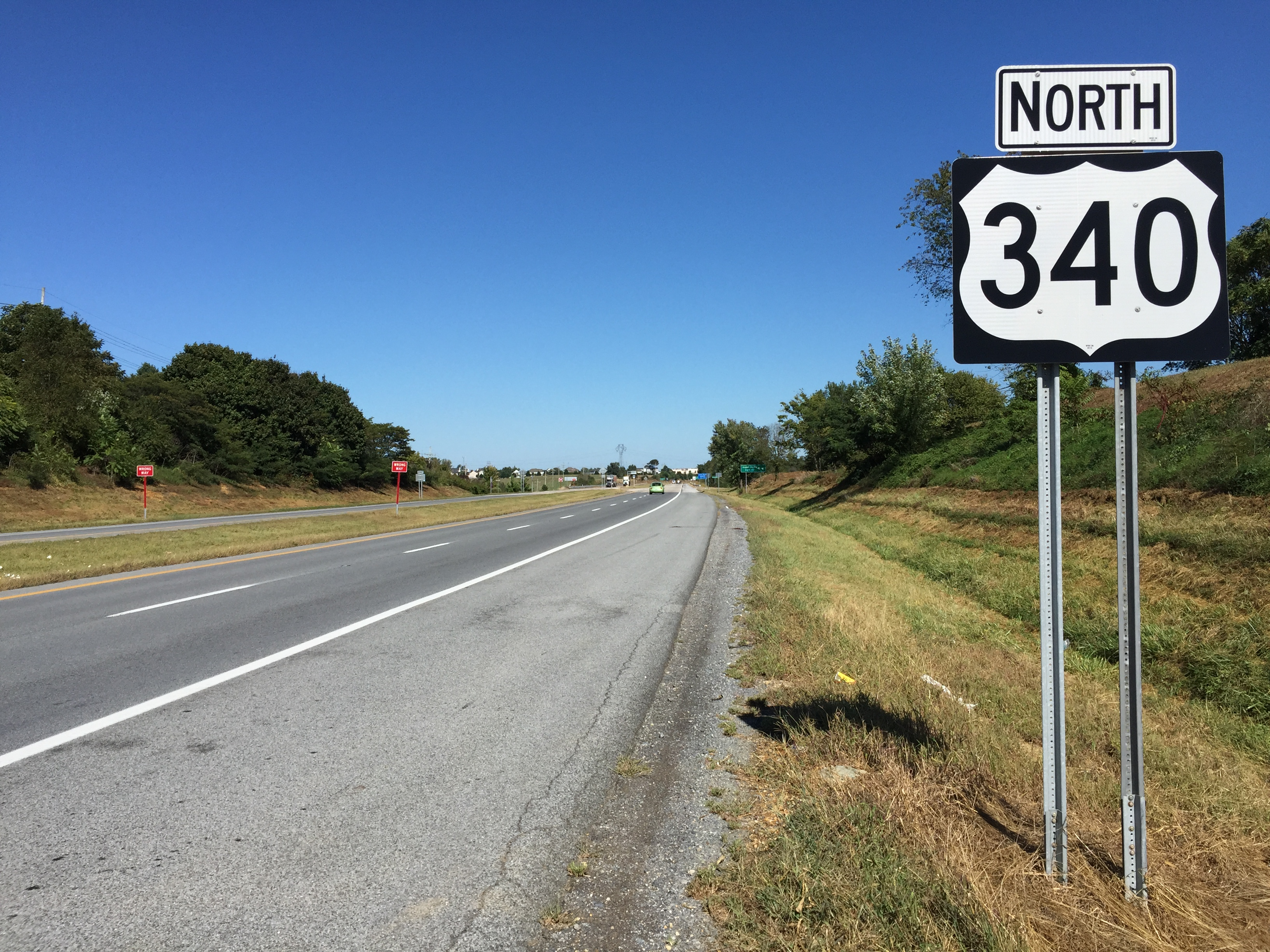
- U.S. Route 340 in Wheatland

- Location within West Virginia Location within the United States
- Coordinates: 39°14′10″N 77°54′00″W
- Country: United States
- State: West Virginia
- County: Jefferson
- Elevation: 472 ft (144 m)
- Time zone: UTC-5 (Eastern (EST))
  - Summer (DST): UTC-4 (EDT)
- GNIS feature ID: 1549985

Wheatland is an unincorporated community in Jefferson County, West Virginia, United States. Wheatland lies along Bullskin Run on the Berryville Pike (U.S. Route 340) at its junction with County Route 340/2.

In November 2023, Route 340 started construction to widen the highway between Wheatland and the Virginia state border from two to four lanes. This was planned to be completed in early 2025.
