= Battle Creek, Virginia =

Unincorporated community in Virginia, US

Coordinates: 38°36′23″N 78°35′09″W

Battle Creek is an unincorporated community in Page County, in the U.S. state of Virginia. It is home to the county landfill, located on U.S. Route 340, which was cleared from the nominally forested area that is common in the locality.
