= Slate Mills, Virginia =

Unincorporated community in Virginia, US

Coordinates: 38°31′53″N 78°10′58″W

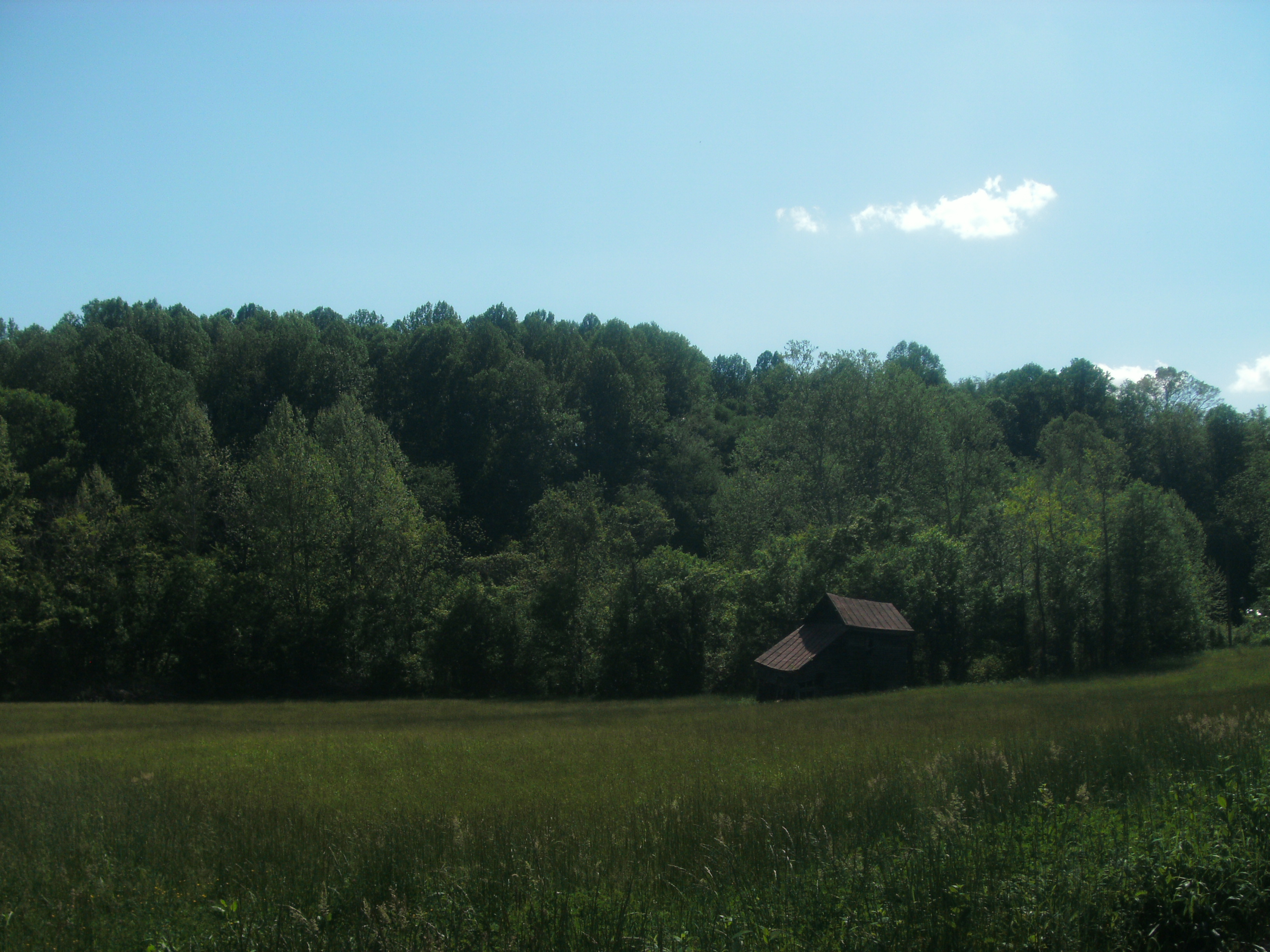
Countryside in Slate Mills

Slate Mills is an unincorporated community in Rappahannock County, in the U.S. state of Virginia.
