= Gaylord, Virginia =

Unincorporated community in Virginia, United States

- Unincorporated community
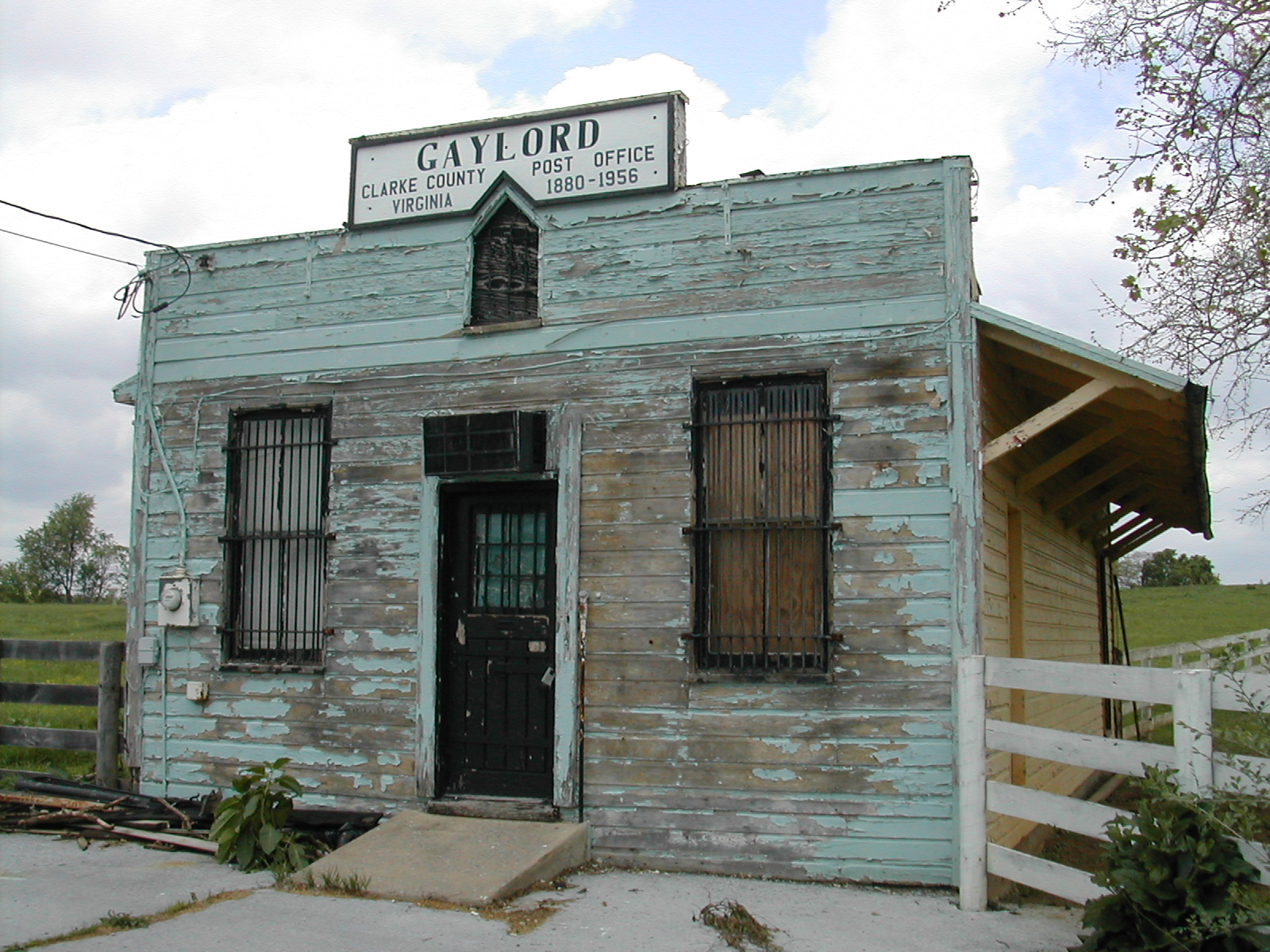
- The former Gaylord post office in May 2005.

- Location within the Commonwealth of Virginia Gaylord (Virginia) Gaylord (the United States)
- Coordinates: 39°11′15″N 77°55′50″W
- Country: United States
- State: Virginia
- County: Clarke
- Time zone: UTC−5 (Eastern (EST))
  - Summer (DST): UTC−4 (EDT)

Gaylord is an unincorporated community in northern Clarke County, Virginia, United States. Gaylord is located on Lord Fairfax Highway (U.S. Route 340). The community had its own post office in operation from 1880 to 1956.
