= Webbtown, Virginia =

Unincorporated community in Virginia, United States

- Unincorporated community
- Location within the Commonwealth of Virginia Webbtown (Virginia) Webbtown (the United States)
- Coordinates: 39°8′29″N 77°56′29″W
- Country: United States
- State: Virginia
- County: Clarke
- Time zone: UTC−5 (Eastern (EST))
  - Summer (DST): UTC−4 (EDT)

Webbtown is an unincorporated community in Clarke County in the U.S. state of Virginia. Webbtown lies to the east of Berryville on Harry Byrd Highway (Virginia State Route 7) at its intersection with Wickliffe Road (VA 608).
