= Forks of Waters, Virginia =

Unincorporated community in Virginia, United States

- Unincorporated community
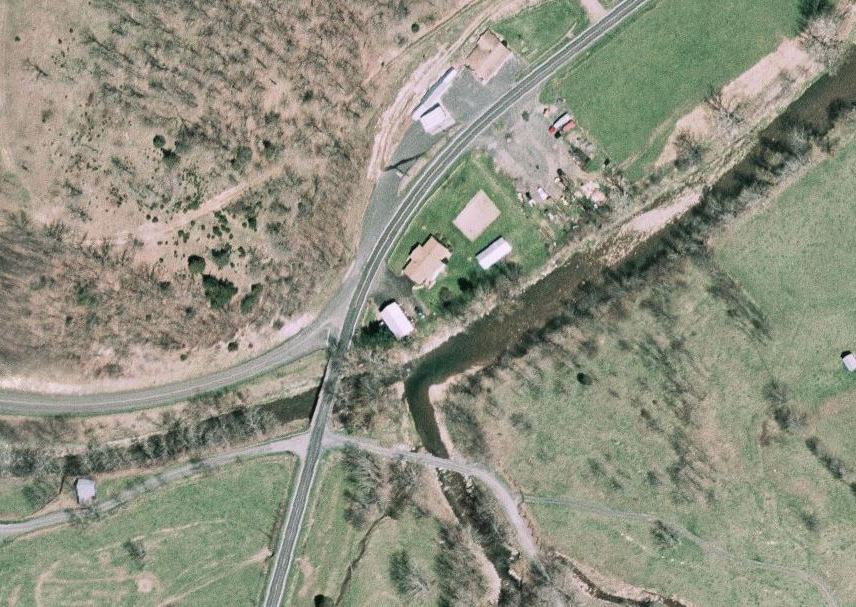
- Aerial view of Forks of Waters. The South Branch Potomac River flows diagonally across the image.

- Location within Virginia Location within the United States
- Coordinates: 38°28′56″N 79°30′31″W
- Country: United States
- State: Virginia
- County: Highland
- Elevation: 2,313 ft (705 m)
- Time zone: UTC−5 (Eastern (EST))
  - Summer (DST): UTC−4 (EDT)
- ZIP codes: 24465
- GNIS feature ID: 1483492

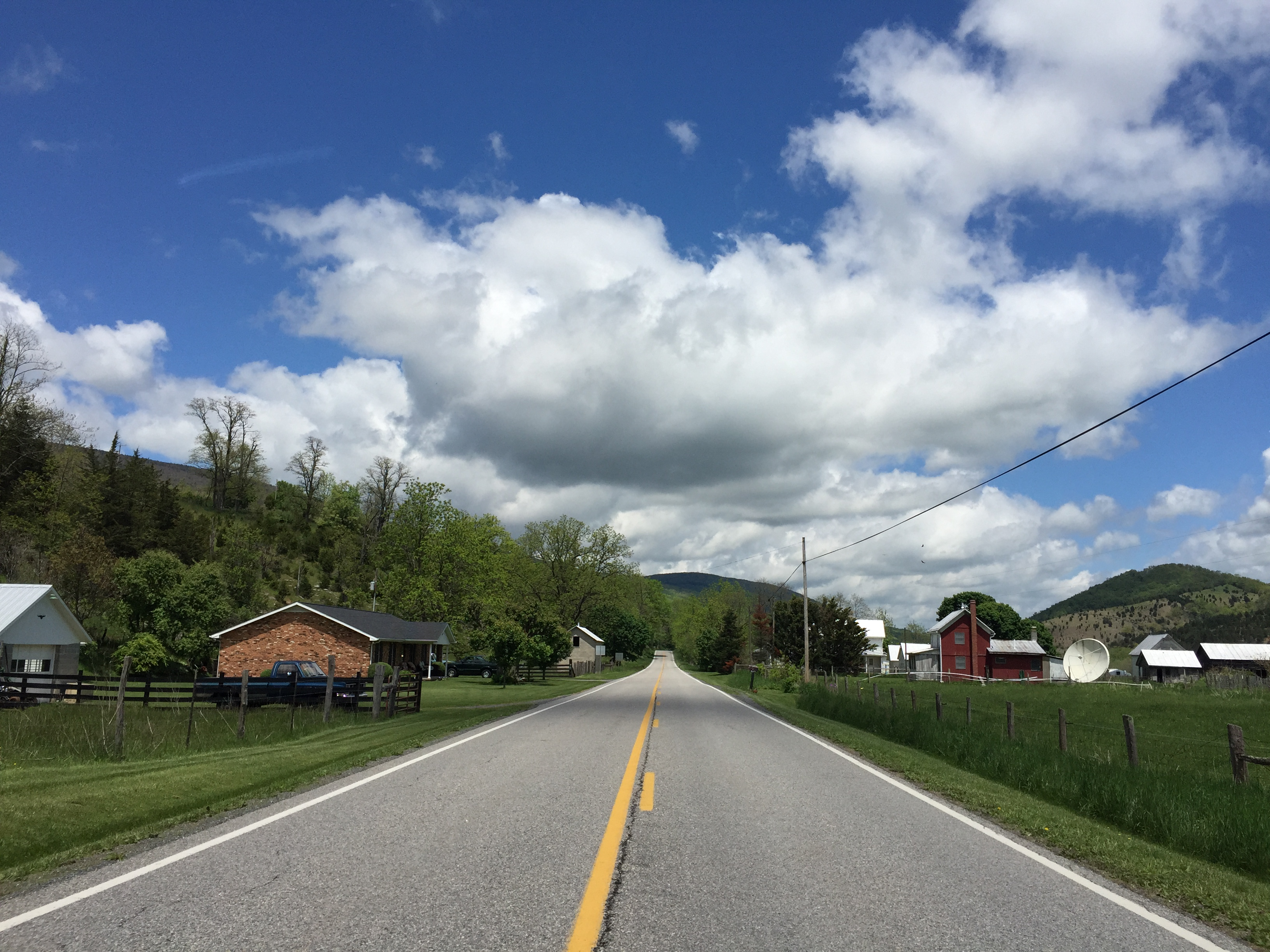
View north along US 220 in Forks of Waters

Forks of Waters (formerly Strait Creek) is an unincorporated community located in Highland County, Virginia, United States. Forks of Waters is located approximately 6 miles (9.7 km) northeast of Monterey at the junction of U.S. Route 220 and Virginia State Route 642. Forks of Waters is so named due to the convergence of the Strait Creek with the South Branch Potomac River near the community. After passing through Forks of Waters, the South Branch Potomac River enters West Virginia approximately 1 mile (1.6 km) to the northeast.
