= Fairview, Page County, Virginia =

Unincorporated community in Virginia, US

Coordinates: 38°39′15″N 78°25′45″W

Fairview, Page County is an unincorporated community in Page County, in the U.S. state of Virginia. In this community, there is a local general store, with a butchery, jams, honey, and interesting snacks. It is near Luray also.
