= Saint Luke, Virginia =

Unincorporated community in Virginia, US

Coordinates: 38°54′12″N 78°34′50″W

Saint Luke is an unincorporated community in Shenandoah County, in the U.S. state of Virginia.
