= Callison, Virginia =

Unincorporated community in Virginia, US

Coordinates: 37°58′43″N 79°54′41″W

Callison is an unincorporated community in Bath County, Virginia, United States.
