= Springfield, Page County, Virginia =

Unincorporated community in Virginia, US

Coordinates: 38°42′16″N 78°26′46″W

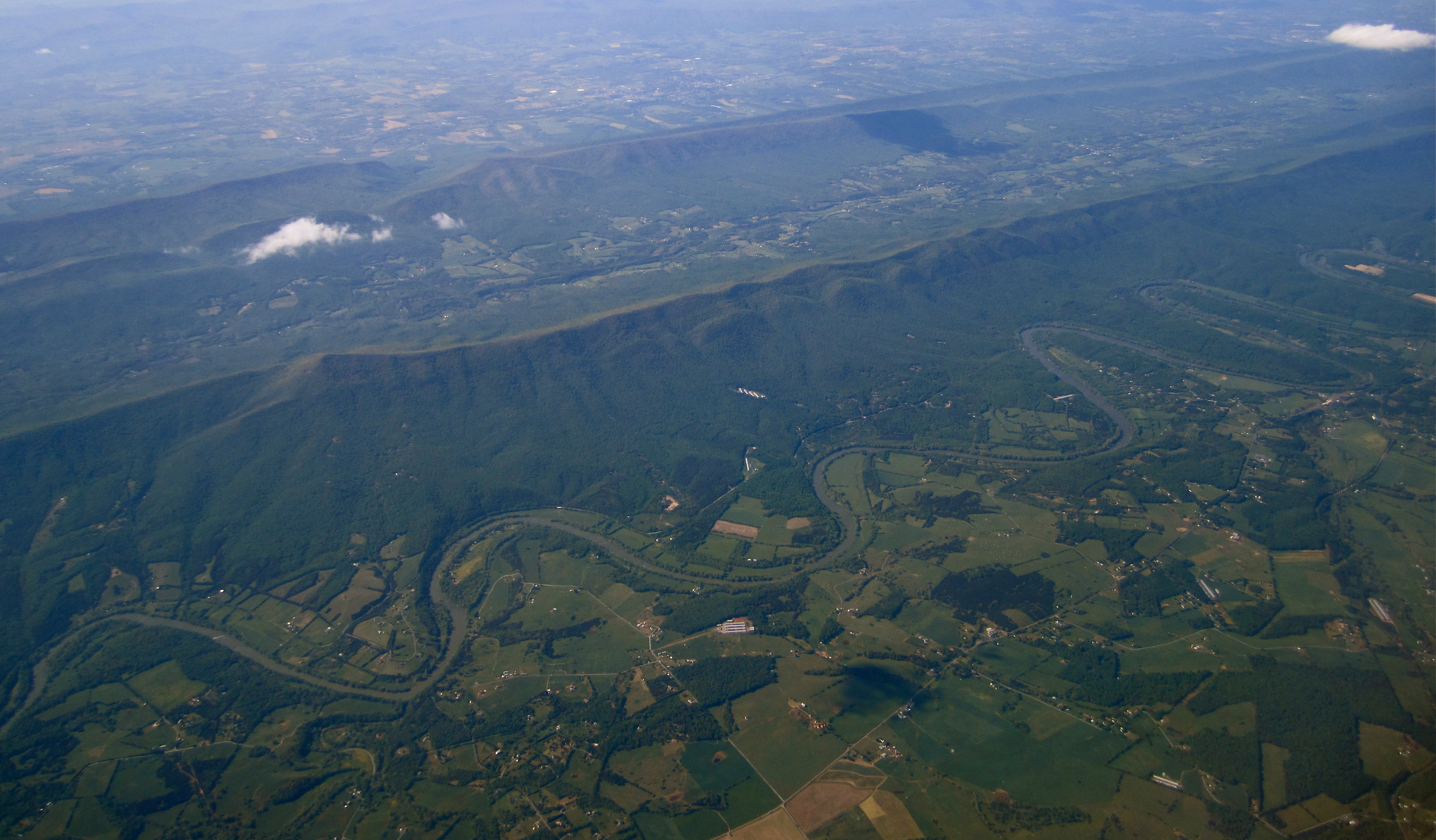
Aerial view of Springfield

Springfield is an unincorporated community in Page County, in the U.S. state of Virginia.
