= Grove Hill, Virginia =

Unincorporated community in Virginia, US

Coordinates: 38°31′43″N 78°36′44″W

Grove Hill is an unincorporated community in Page County, in the U.S. state of Virginia.
