= Clearwater Park, Virginia =

Unincorporated community in Virginia, United States

Coordinates: 37°50′13″N 79°59′09″W

Clearwater Park is an unincorporated community in Alleghany County, Virginia, United States.
