= Ladd, Virginia =

Unincorporated community in Virginia, United States

- Unincorporated community
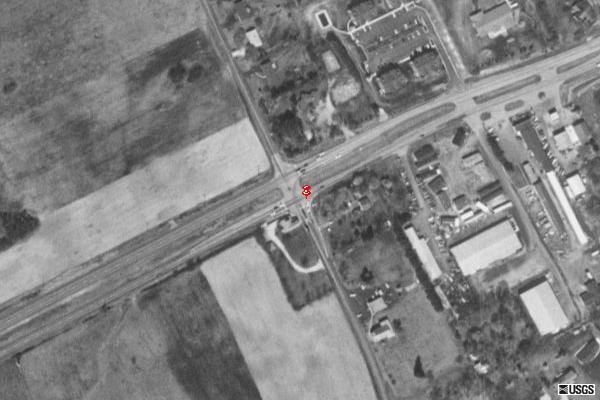
- Aerial view of Ladd

- Location within Virginia Location within the United States
- Coordinates: 38°03′21″N 78°57′12″W
- Country: United States
- State: Virginia
- County: Augusta
- Elevation: 1,411 ft (430 m)
- Time zone: UTC-5 (Eastern (EST))
  - Summer (DST): UTC-4 (EDT)
- GNIS feature ID: 1484639

Ladd is an unincorporated community in Augusta County, Virginia, United States. Ladd is located just outside the independent city of Waynesboro and inside Augusta County. Founded in 1854, the only notable buildings of Ladd left as of 2005 were the Bethlehem Lutheran Church (built 1854), the General Store, and two homes dating to the early 1900s.
