= Fishers Gap =

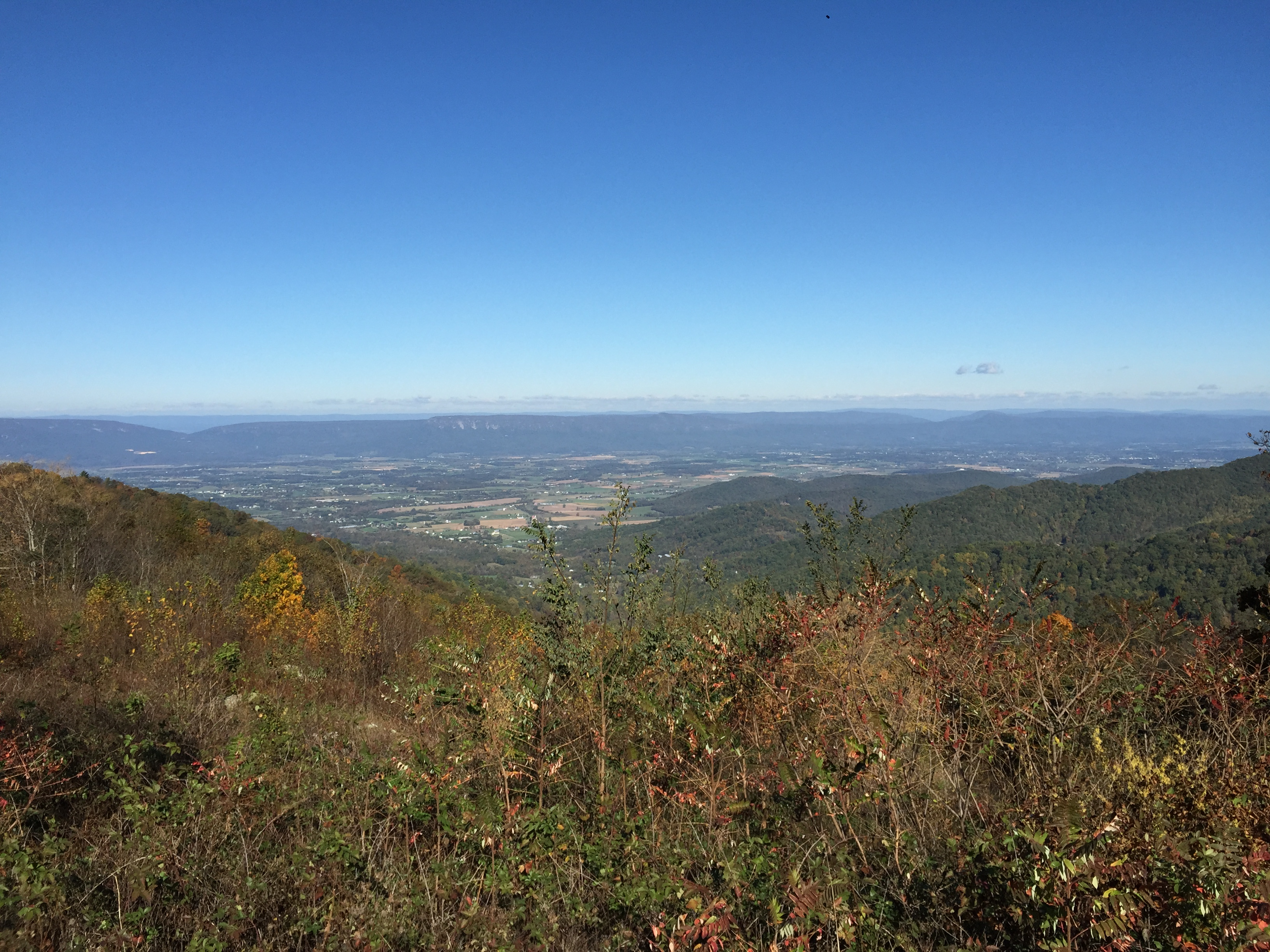
- View northwest from Fishers Gap Overlook
- Interactive map of Fishers Gap
- Elevation: 3,064 feet (934 m)

Third Approach
- Location: Madison / Page counties, Virginia, United States
- Range: Blue Ridge Mountains
- Coordinates: 38°32′00″N 078°25′15″W

Fishers Gap is a wind gap of the Blue Ridge Mountains located on the border of Madison County and Page County in Virginia in the Shenandoah National Park. Both Skyline Drive and the Appalachian Trail pass across the gap.

== Geography ==
The gap is approximately 2,000 feet (610 m) above the surrounding countryside. The gap is nearly 1,000 feet (300 m) below Hawksbill Mountain, the tallest in the park, to the north and 300 feet (91 m) below Big Meadows and Stony Man Mountain to the south. The Rose River flows down the hollow on the gap's east face and Little Hawksbill creek does the same down its west face.

== History ==
Fishers Gap is named for a Stephen Fisher who received a Northern Neck Land Grant for 216 acres at the gap on 4 August 1778. His grant reads: "....do give, grant and confirm unto Stephen Fisher of Culpeper County a certain Tract of Waste & ungranted land near Milam's Pass on the Blue Ridge in Culpeper and Shenandoah Counties bounded as by Survey thereof made by Richard Young." Deeds recording subsequent sales of this 216 acres can be traced to Isaac N. Long's sale to the Virginia State Commission on Conservation on 8 July 1931. The National Park Service then acquired the land for the Shenandoah National Park which labeled it: Madison County, Tract I. N. Long 141. The 1932 U. S. Geological Survey for the park shows that Madison County Tract 141 is exactly at their labeled Fisher's Gap.

The reference to "Milam's Pass" in Fisher's original Grant is also found in Fisher's 1770 land survey as well as in all later deeds including Isaac Long's 1894 purchase deed: "....to wit: The tract of 216 acres more or less of land lying in the counties of Madison & Page near what is known as Milam's pass or Milam's gap on the Blue Ridge Mountains being the same land adjoining what is known as the Meadows Tract...." The phrase is again found in Capt. Thomas Bohannon's 1805 land Grant: "....nigh a path called Milan's pass, on the North side of Double Top {Mountain}...." These references are to an early settler on Double Top Mountain named Thomas Milam who lived just east of Bohannon's land from the 1740s to 1760 and who most probably first discovered this path or pass across the Blue Ridge Mountains to the Shenandoah Valley which for so long bore his name.

Fisher's Gap doesn't appear on any map of the area until after the Gordonsville New Market Turnpike was completed in the Spring of 1853. It was constructed by the Blue Ridge Turnpike Company which was incorporated in 1848. Jedediah Hotchkiss, topographic engineer to General Thomas J. (Stonewall) Jackson, described the turnpike and his ride across Fisher's Gap in a letter to his wife in early November 1862: ".....Monday was a fine day, and I had a nice ride across the Blue Ridge, by the crookedest road I have ever seen -- 19 miles across -- but the road is a fine one -- I stopped for the night at the foot of the Mountain. Tuesday I came on to New Market....” Two weeks later, during the American Civil War, Confederate General Thomas (Stonewall) Jackson led most of his army across the Gordonsville New Market Turnpike en route to Fredericksburg, where he played a significant role in the Battle of Fredericksburg a month later.

The sad end of the Gordonsville Newmarket Turnpike was recounted in the Blue Ridge Turnpike Company records of June, 1867: "....the road was used by both armies....whole organization was broken down and the {toll} Gates discontinued...." And on 5 June 1867: “....owing to the late war the Blue Ridge Turnpike Company has been disorganized...." Within the Shenandoah National Park, the 105 mile long Skyline Drive was constructed between 1933 and 1939. Just north of the Big Meadows rest center - near mile marker 50 - there is the Fisher's Gap Overlook (3140 Feet Altitude). The remnants of the Gordonsville New Market Turnpike survive today as the Rose River and Redgate fire roads within the park.

Stephen Fisher's 1778 Northern Neck Land Grant

Isaac N. Long's 1894 Madison County Purchase Deed

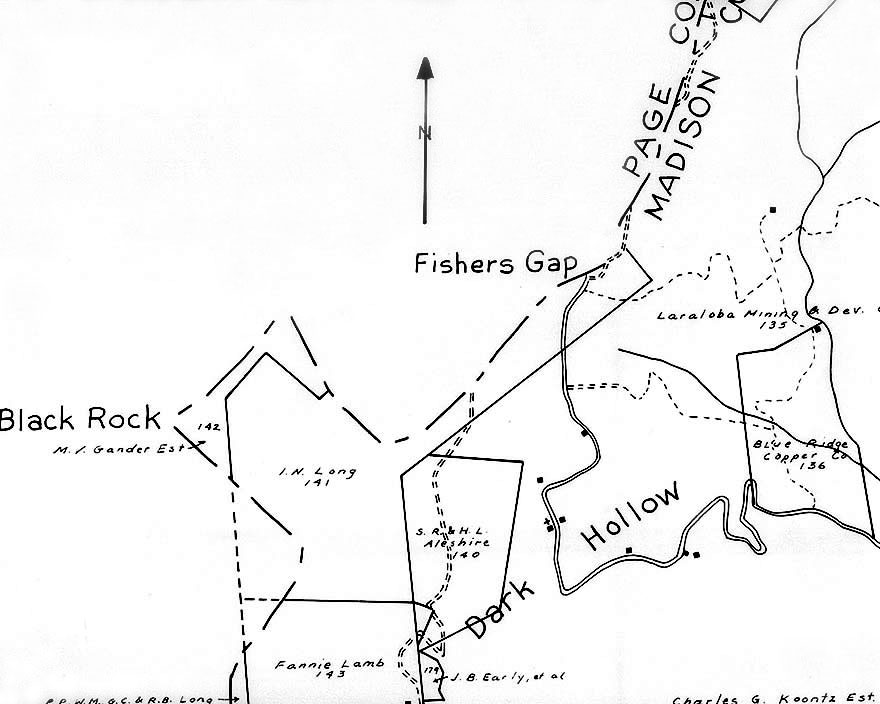
1932 U S Geological Survey of Shenandoah National Park, Madison Tract 141

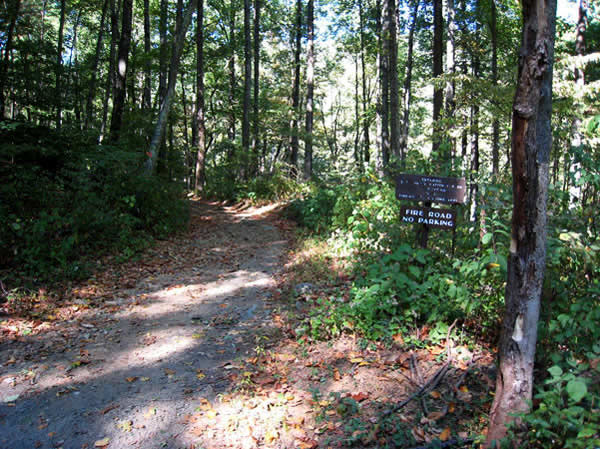
Photo of Rose River Fire Road in Shenandoah National Park
