= Frogtown, Clarke County, Virginia =

Unincorporated community in Virginia, United States

Frogtown, Virginia
- Unincorporated community
- Location within the Commonwealth of Virginia Frogtown (Virginia) Frogtown (the United States)
- Coordinates: 39°3′58″N 77°56′1″W
- Country: United States
- State: Virginia
- County: Clarke
- Time zone: UTC−5 (Eastern (EST))
  - Summer (DST): UTC−4 (EDT)
- ZIP codes: 20135 (Post Office: Bluemont; Loudoun County, VA)

Frogtown is an unincorporated community on Morgan Mill Stream in Clarke County, Virginia, United States. Frogtown is located on Frogtown Road (VA 649).
