= Albert Gatschet =

Swiss-American linguist (1832–1907)

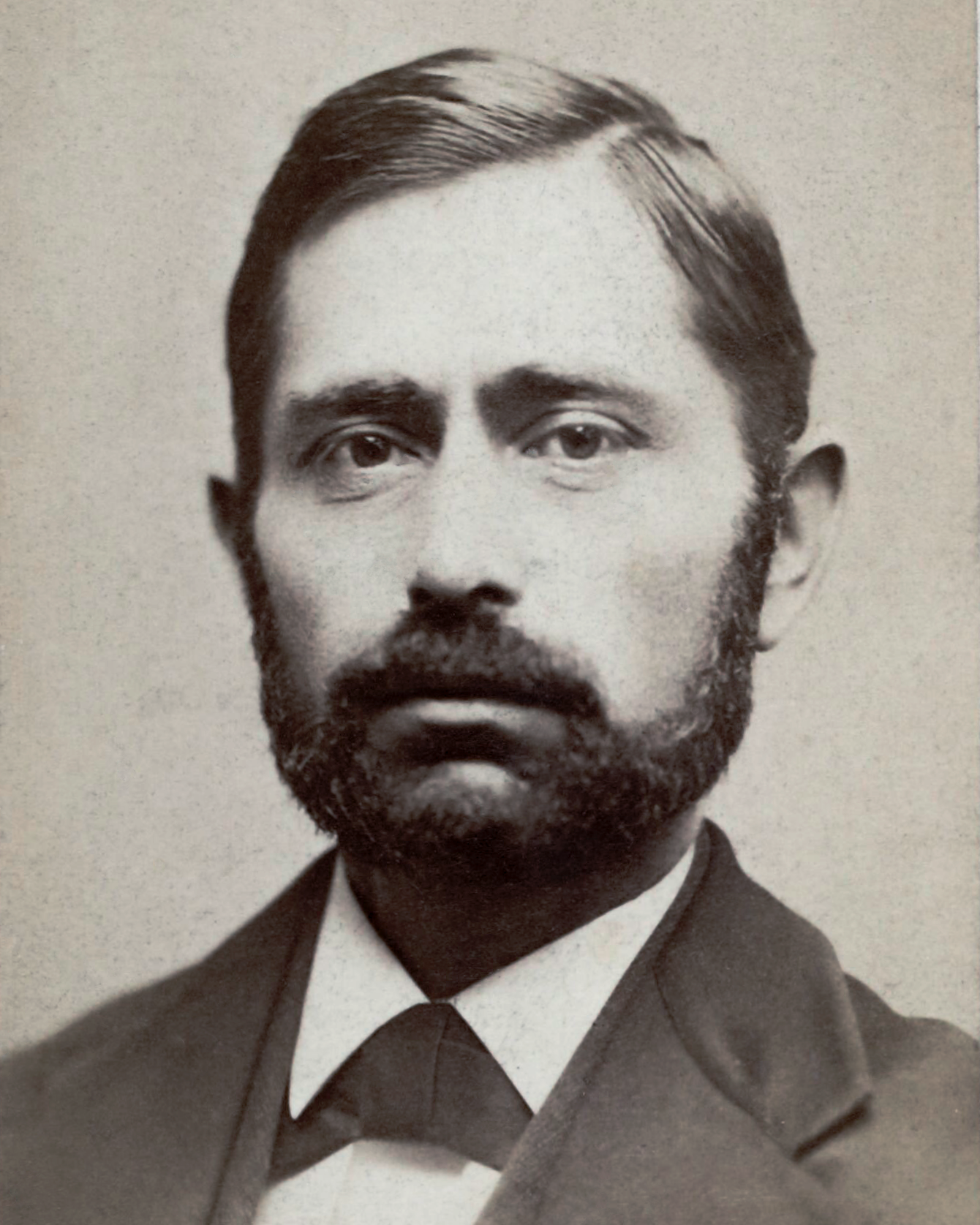
- Born: October 3, 1832; Saint Beatenberg, Bern, Switzerland
- Died: March 16, 1907 (aged 74); Washington, D.C., United States
- Resting place: Mount Peace Cemetery
- Citizenship: Switzerland; United States (from 1896)
- Spouse: Louise Horner (m. 1892)

Academic background
- Education: University of Berlin

Academic work
- Discipline: Comparative linguistics; philology; ethnology
- Sub-discipline: Indigenous languages and peoples of North America
- Institutions: Smithsonian Institution; Bureau of American Ethnology

Signature
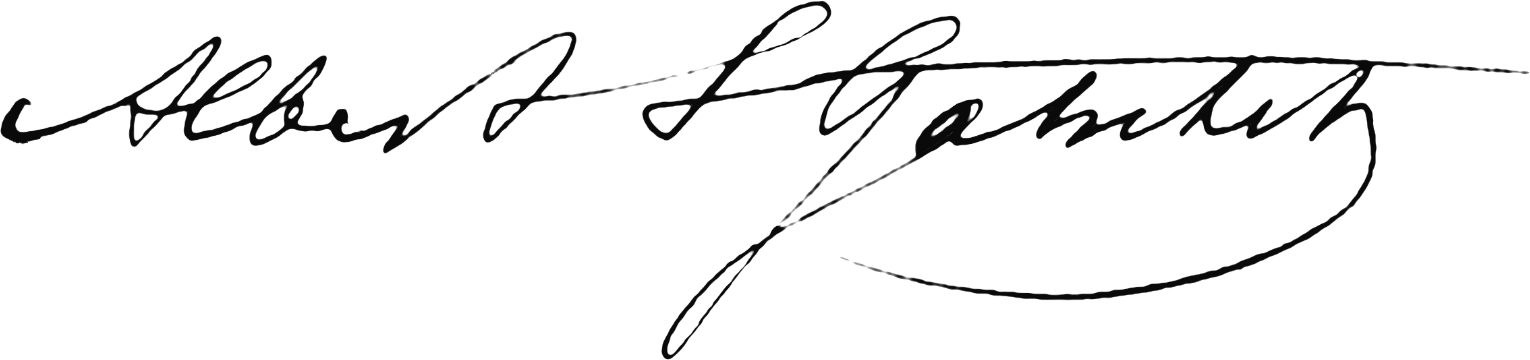

Albert Louis Samuel Gatschet (/ˈɡætʃɪt/ GATCH-it or /ɡəˈʃeɪ/ gə-SHAY; (Note: Swiss Standard German pronunciation: [ˈgaːt͡ʃɛt]. It has been suggested that Gatschet may have gallicized his name following his immigration to the United States.) October 3, 1832 – March 16, 1907) was a Swiss-American linguist, philologist, and ethnologist. He is best known for his contributions to the study of the Indigenous peoples and languages of North America. His work included analyses of almost a hundred different languages and preserved many on the brink of extinction.

Born in Switzerland to a Protestant minister, Gatschet studied at universities in Switzerland and Germany before immigrating to the United States in 1868, where he worked as a language teacher. In 1872, the German botanist Oscar Loew asked him to analyze sixteen American Indian vocabularies recorded during the Wheeler Survey. His analysis was presented to the United States Congress and culminated in a German-language book which earned him the attention of Major John Wesley Powell, who hired Gatschet as an ethnologist for the Smithsonian Institution. Gatschet was later a founding member of the Bureau of American Ethnology and spent the majority of his life traveling the United States and completing surveys of the nation's languages en masse.

Gatschet's work remains highly regarded; his ethnological and linguistic publications on Indigenous peoples and their languages are considered to have pioneered the field. His reorganization of the language families of Indigenous languages earned him significant appreciation during his lifetime. His work on the Klamath people earned him particular praise, including from the people themselves several decades after his death. The American linguist Ives Goddard described Gatschet's work as part of the driving force behind a period of transition away from missionary-based linguistic study and towards a view based on scientific interest.

== Early life and education ==
Albert Louis Samuel Gatschet was born on October 3, 1832, in Saint Beatenberg, Switzerland, the second child and only son of Mary (née Ziegler) and Karl Albert Gatschet, a Protestant minister. Mary died when Albert was about ten years old, and he was thereafter raised in part by his older sister, Louise. Following his mother's death, Albert's loss was made more difficult by his father's severe disposition, though he remained extremely affectionate towards his sister throughout his life.

In his youth, Gatschet's education was primarily religious, and he considered becoming a reverend like his father. He attended the gymnasia in Neuchâtel and Bern. Gatschet attended the University of Bern from 1852 to 1858, studying languages, history, art, and theology; his favorite subjects there were Ancient Greek and theological doctrinal criticism. The same year he left the University of Bern, he began studying languages at the University of Berlin.

== Career ==
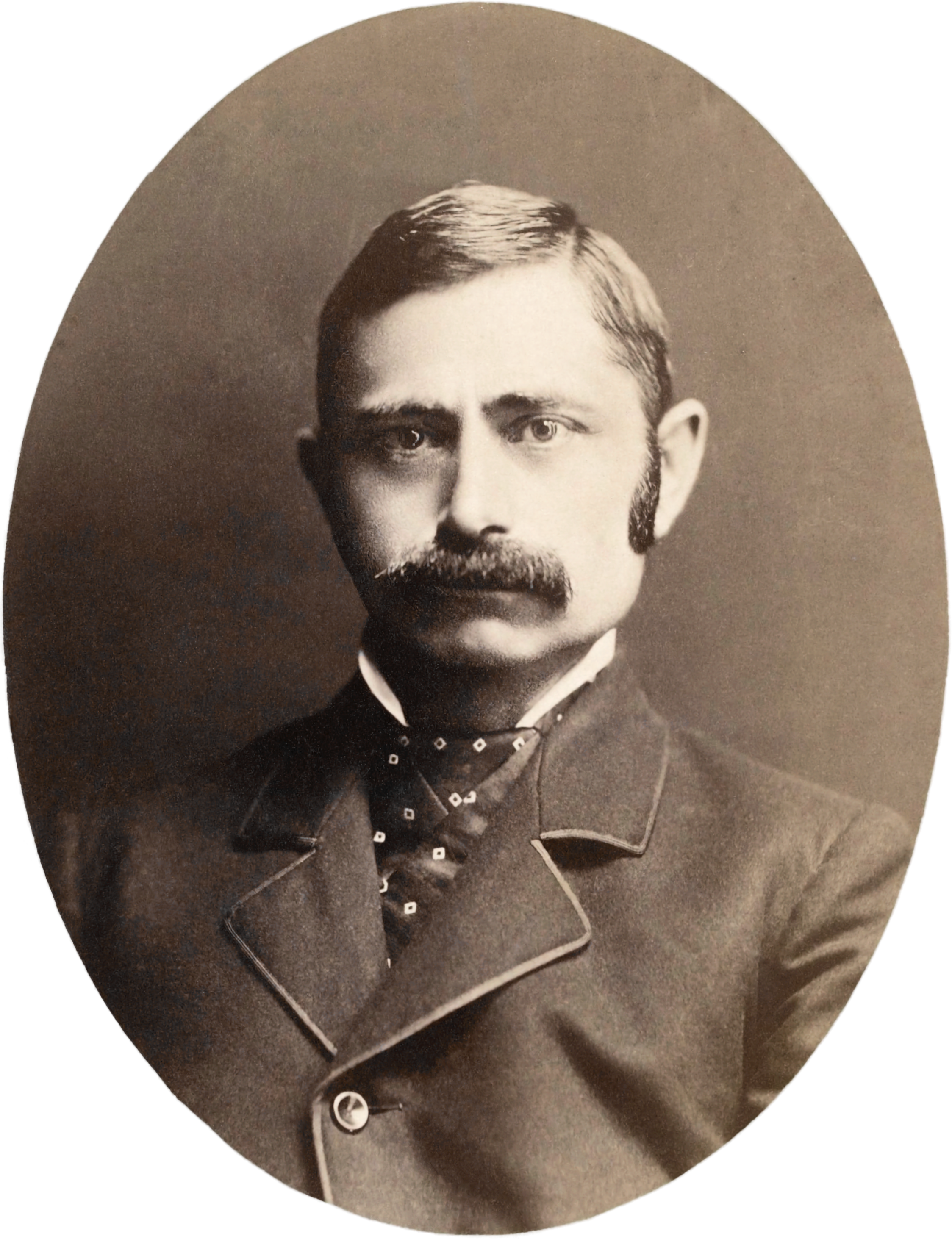
Gatschet in 1879

Although he had published a handful of articles before, Gatschet published his first major work in 1867, Ortsetymologische Forschungen aus der Schweiz ('Toponymic Etymological Research in Switzerland') (Note: Sometimes cited as Ortsetymologische Forschungen als Beiträge zu einer Toponomastik der Schweiz ('Toponymic Etymological Research as Contributions to the Toponomastics of Switzerland').) which dealt with the etymological origins of place names around his native Switzerland. The book met with critical success and remained a standard reference work until his death. Gatschet spent several months following its publication working at various museums in Paris and London, including the British Museum, before immigrating to the United States the following January where he settled in New York City.

In New York, Gatschet continued to publish linguistics articles but worked primarily as a language teacher, being fluent in both French and German, though he reportedly had difficulty with English. In 1872, he was given the recorded vocabularies of sixteen American Indian languages to analyze by the German botanist Oscar Loew, who had been attached to the Wheeler Survey tasked with exploring the Southwestern United States. Gatschet's analyses of the vocabularies were reported in the 1875 and 1876 volumes of the Wheeler reports, culminating in another publication entitled Zwölf Sprachen aus dem Südwesten Nordamerikas. (Note: Full title: Zwölf Sprachen aus dem südwesten Nordamerikas (Pueblos- und Apache-Mundarten; Tonto, Tonkawa, Digger, Utah.) – Wortverzeichnisse herausgegeben, erläutert und mit einer Einleitung uber Bau, Begriffsbildung und locale Gruppirung der amerikanischen Sprachen versehen (transl. 'Twelve Languages of Southwestern North America (Pueblo and Apache Dialects; Tonto, Tonkawa, Digger, Utah) – Dictionary Editions, Explanatory Notes, and an Introduction on Structure, Concept Formation, and Local Grouping of American Languages'); also known as simply Zwölf Sprachen ('Twelve Languages'). The term Digger is now considered an ethnic slur for American Indians indigenous to the West Coast of the United States, namely the Southern Paiute people though Gatschet used it to refer to the northern dialect of the Wintu language.)

Although Zwölf Sprachen was published in Weimar, the publication earned Gatschet the attention of John Wesley Powell, a major in the United States Army, then serving as Director of the Geographical and Geological Survey of the Rocky Mountain Region. In March 1877, Gatschet accepted an offer from Powell to become an ethnologist under him in order to classify and document the languages of the region, prompting Gatschet to relocate to Washington, D.C., permanently. Upon his arrival, he began working with the Smithsonian Institution to classify its existing documentation of American Indian languages, including a five-year effort to classify and describe the Yuman languages of the Southwest. The same year, the government commissioned him to formulate a comprehensive account of the Pacific Northwest, beginning with an expedition to the Otaki village of the Maidu in the Sacramento Valley and later visiting the Modoc and Kalapuya peoples, among others. There, he also began his work on the Klamath people in and around modern-day border of Oregon and California.

In 1879, Gatschet became a founding member of the Bureau of American Ethnology, with Powell as its new director. His work on the Klamath was halted following Powell's order to reexamine the phylogenetic relationships of the nation's language families – that is, the relation of these families to each other through linguistic descent rather than through contact or chance resemblance – to create a more certain classification system. Gatschet was among several linguists who were deployed to different parts of the country to reassess classifications. In December 1881, Gatschet traveled to South Carolina where he discovered the relationship between the local Catawba language and the Siouan languages of the Great Plains.

Between 1881 and 1882, Gatschet traveled to Louisiana and studied the area's remnant languages in an attempt to classify them; at the time of his death, his work was the only extant phylogenetic analysis ever undertaken for several of the languages he studied. In January 1885, Gatschet traveled to the city of Lake Charles to begin work on the Atakapa language. There, he discovered the last village of the tribe – Túl Núŋ – experiencing a mass exodus as tribesmen who could speak the language began migrating to Texas and Oklahoma. Gatschet worked with "the two most knowledgeable speakers of the language" – cousins Kišyuc ('Will-o'-the-Wisp') (Note: Also called Yoyot.) and Tottokš ('Round [Eyes]') – in the village. He later published a plea encouraging others to study the language, but it was unsuccessful during his lifetime. The year after Gatschet's death, John R. Swanton took up the plea, publishing a good portion of Gatschet's notes and finishing his dictionary by 1932. While Swanton attempted to conduct his own research, he found the tribe somewhat reluctant to speak to outsiders and a significant portion of his work has been lost entirely. Although a handful of vocabularies existed prior, Gatschet's work on Atakapa's grammar is the only extant source. Later that year, Gatschet's work took him to Oklahoma, where he undertook the first major survey of the Yuchi language. He traveled back to Louisiana in 1885 and 1886 to study Tunica, Chitimacha, Biloxi, and two dialects of Choctaw. Further studies in 1886 took him across the Rio Grande into Mexico to study the last six speakers of the Carrizo language. His work in Mexico took him as far south as Saltillo to the Nahuatl-speaking Tlaxcalteca.

Gatschet also made a number of contributions to the study of other languages indigenous to the Gulf coast of modern-day Texas. His two-word recording of the Haname language from a Tonkawa elder in 1884 (Himia'na tsa'yi! 'Give me water!') is the only documentation of the language. In November 1888, he traveled to Lynn, Massachusetts, to help complete an account of the Karankawa language, originally spoken in Texas. He was able to review early works with his informant Alice Oliver while also eliciting new vocabulary. Oliver was then a sixty-year-old white woman from Matagorda who had learned the language in her childhood. An attempt to link the language other local Texan languages was about to be underway, but Oliver died the following February. The work Gatschet was able to complete was published in 1891, which covered both the language and some ethnographic notes. The work followed the publication of the Creek Migration Legend published in two volumes in 1884 and 1888, which served as an outline of much of his work on the Gulf coast. The contemporary American ethnologist James Mooney described Gatschet's efforts on the Gulf coast and Mexico as being immeasurably bolstered by Gatschet's impressive command of both Spanish and French.

However, Gatschet's studies were not entirely premised on travel and strict fieldwork; he often consulted local documentation – typically compiled by earlier missionaries – and other miscellany when he traveled, often by using his own vacation time. In Washington, D.C., when American Indian delegations arrived to attend sessions of Congress, Gatschet was known to interview their members for several nights in a row. At the time of his death, a significant portion was still unpublished.

In 1890, Gatschet published The Klamath Indians of Southwestern Oregon, a more-than-1,500-page monograph published in two parts. The contents are the result of years of investigation on the Klamath reservation, its first volume comprising a compilation of accounts of the Modoc War by Klamath veterans, biographical sketches, cultural customs and jurisprudence, and tribal legends and stories recounted to him by Winema, Curly Ball, and a few others, written with English interlinear glossing. The second volume comprises both a Klamath–English dictionary and an English–Klamath one. The work captures the language as it was spoken before it experienced significant contamination from the growing dominance of Chinook Jargon; Gatschet was discerning in distinguishing the speech of those who were already beginning to have their language affected by language contact. The book was extremely well-received among its readership. Decades after his death, The National Cyclopædia of American Biography described the publication as "one of the most exhaustive studies of an American native language ever undertaken and may fairly be said to mark an epoch in the science of linguistics". Many Klamath expressed approval at his work as well, with one writing fifty years after his death that "his work with our Indians [...] can never be surpassed or even equaled".

== Later life and death ==
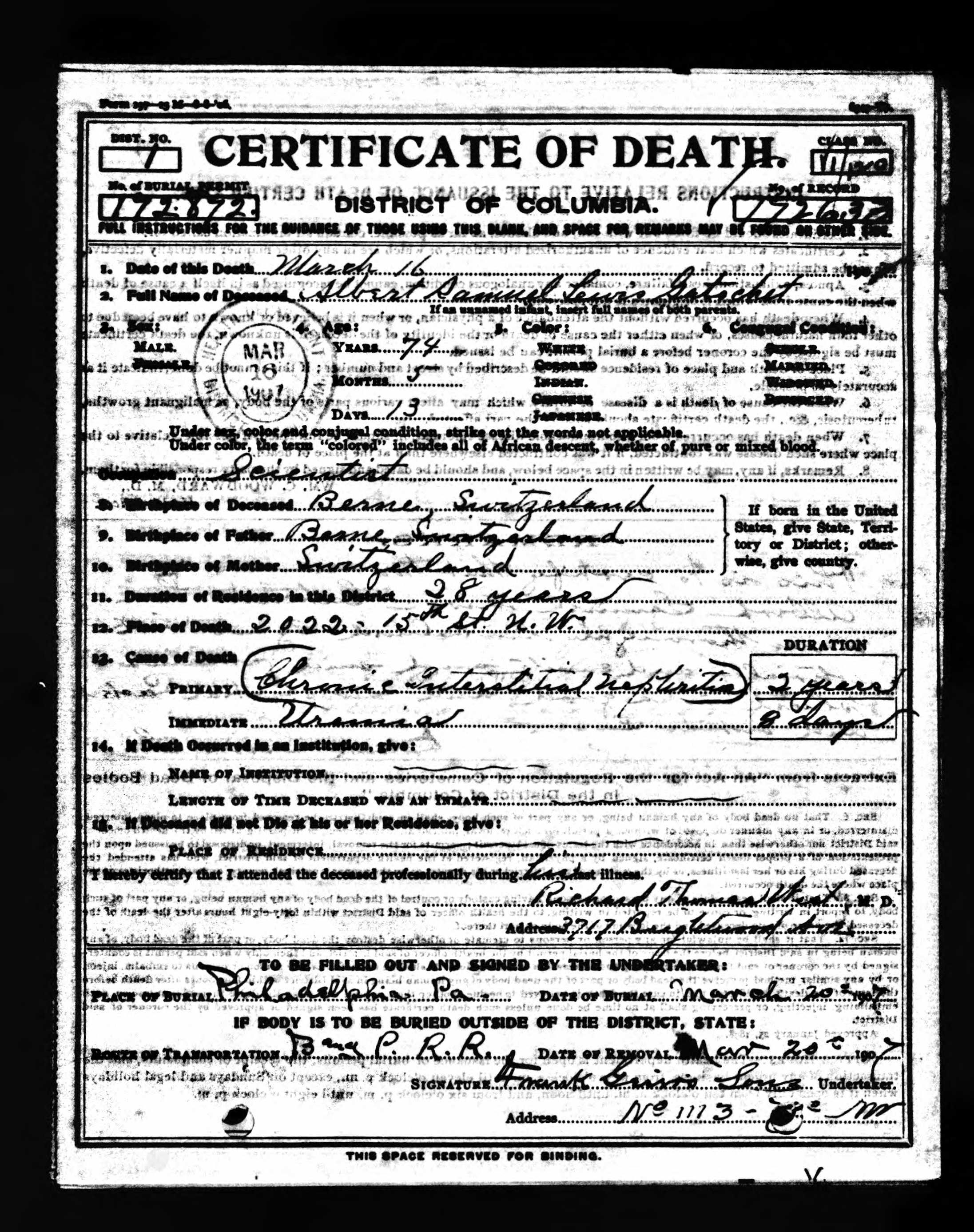
Gatschet's death certificate

In September 1892, Gatschet married Louise Horner, a widow from Philadelphia about twenty-four years his junior. The same year, the University of Bern granted him an honorary doctorate. Gatschet became a naturalized citizen of the United States on September 28, 1896.

Later in life, Gatschet became overly involved in his work to the point of neglecting his own health. Following the publication of The Klamath Tribe and Language of Oregon, the Bureau of American Ethnology commissioned him to begin a comparative grammar survey of the Algonquian languages, which he planned to follow with a survey of the Shawnee language, but he was forced to retire on March 1, 1905, following the exacerbation of the kidney disease he ultimately died from. Before he left, he gave the Bureau a massive manuscript "probably equal in extent" to his Klamath publication, containing about ten thousand words of the Peoria language. Gatschet's health began deteriorating rapidly following his retirement and he was constantly attended to by his wife. His later life was marked with what his doctors referred to as fainting spells. In July 1906, he collapsed in the street and had to be revived at Freedman's Hospital.

Gatschet died in Washington, D.C., on March 16, 1907, of Bright's disease and overwork at the age of 74. The couple had no children. Although later in life he had become unconcerned with spiritual matters altogether, an Episcopalian funeral service was held at his house on 15th Street three days after his death. He was buried at Mount Peace Cemetery in Philadelphia the following day.

== Recognition and legacy ==
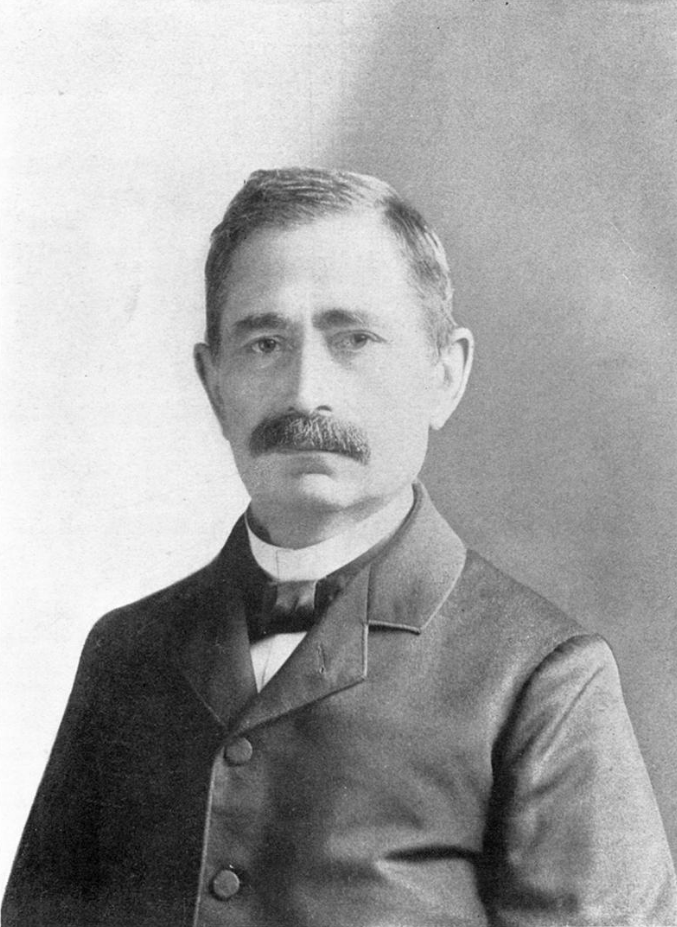
Gatschet, c. 1894

Gatschet is considered to be a pioneer in the study of American Indian peoples and their languages. In 1902, The Washington Post described him as "among the greatest of American ethnologists, having done more toward ordering and classifying the disordered mass of American linguistics than any living authority on American philology". Despite this, most of Gatschet's field notes remain unanalyzed as of 2020. Although the majority of Gatschet's work was done in the United States, his work was better known and more highly regarded among European academics during his lifetime. The American-French historian Henry Vignaud wrote that "he did much for his adopted homeland, where it can be said that he created the science of languages considered in their relationship to race". Retrospectives have often compared Gatschet to his Swiss-American compatriots Albert Gallatin and Louis Agassiz, who also made substantial contributions to their scientific fields.

The American linguist Ives Goddard described the efforts of Gatschet and James Owen Dorsey as "two men of unusual linguistic ability and equipment" who ushered in a period of linguistic interest motivated "by scientific interest rather than missionary zeal". Gatschet's work examined over a hundred American Indian languages, many of which were critically endangered at the time of his documentation. He wrote the first major works on Muskogee and Hitchiti, and began the only Atakapa-language dictionary. (Note: John R. Swanton completed the dictionary in 1932 with what he reported was the last fluent speaker.) By 1902, he had published over a hundred works on Indigenous languages.

Gatschet's influence on the study of the Siouan languages is profound. His work identified the Siouan-speaking peoples' Urheimat as having been closer to the East Coast of the United States than the Great Plains, as was previously assumed. Linguists now believe Proto-Siouan was spoken in and around the Ohio River Valley. His work with the Biloxi people and their language on the Gulf Coast made him the first to identify the language as Siouan.

Throughout his career, Gatschet was a member of several learned societies, including the American Association for the Advancement of Science, the American Philological Society, the American Folklore Society, the National Geographic Society, the Anthropological Society of Washington, the Washington Academy of Sciences, the Anthropological Society of Vienna, the Historical Society of Canton Bern, and the Grütliverein of Bern, among others. He was also a beneficiary member of the Bookbinders Guild of Bern. In 1884, he was elected a member of the American Philosophical Society, followed by election to the American Antiquarian Society in 1902.

=== Personality ===
Although highly regarded for his work, Gatschet had a reputation for being solitary, emotionally distant, and unresponsive, which led to some tension between him and his colleagues. In a letter to Wilberforce Eames, James Pilling – Powell's chief clerk – described Gatschet as "certainly more nearly devoid of all idea of courtesy and social decorum than any man I have ever met". Pilling also berated Gatschet for continuing to browse his papers unsupervised and without permission. D. G. Brinton, another member of Powell's team, refused to speak to Gatschet at all. However, Gatschet's usefulness during the survey prompted Powell to protect him from the enmity of other members of the entourage.

Gatschet's friend and colleague James Mooney wrote that "his chief characteristics were thoroughness and absolute honesty", but admitted that "it was practically impossible for him to collaborate" with others in his work. The National Cyclopædia of American Biography similarly described him as "a brilliant and painstaking scholar [...] of an unusually retiring nature and, by preference, most of his important work was accomplished alone". Alfred Kroeber described meeting him thus:

Gatschet I saw at least once in Washington, but he seemed as shy for an old man as I certainly was for a young one, and we did not get far. He rarely attended meetings; as Mooney says, he "preferred to work alone".

He was also known as morally upright, loyal, and unwilling to tolerate pseudoscience. In response to one such claim, he remarked: "To guess is not science".

== Selected works ==
- Gatschet, Albert S. (1882). Phonetics of the Kayowē [Kiowa] Language. Cincinnati Meeting of the American Association for the Advancement of Science. Chicago: Jameson & Morse. LCCN 25016862.
- —— (1884). A Migration Legend of the Creek Indians, with a Linguistic, Historic and Ethnographic Introduction. Brinton's Library of Aboriginal American Literature. Vol. IV. Philadelphia: D. G. Brinton. pp. 159–171.
- —— (1889). Sex-Denoting Nouns in American Languages. Transactions of the American Philological Society. Vol. XX. Washington, D.C.: American Philological Association. pp. 159–171.
- —— (1891). A Mythic Tale of the Isleta Indians, New Mexico; The Race of the Antelope and the Hawk Around the Horizon. Proceedings of the American Philosophical Society. Vol. XXIX. Philadelphia: MacCalla & Company. pp. 207–218.
- —— (1891). The Karankawa Indians: The Coast People of Texas. Archaeological and Ethnological Papers of the Peabody Museum. Vol. 1. Cambridge, Massachusetts: Peabody Museum of Archaeology and Ethnology.
- —— (1896). Peet, Stephen D. (ed.). "The Whip-Poor-Will as Named in American Languages". American Antiquarian and Oriental Journal. XVIII (1). New York.
- —— (1897). "All Around the Bay of Passamaquoddy: With the Interpretation of Its Indian Names of Localities". National Geographic. Vol. VIII, no. 1. Washington, D.C.: Judd & Detweiler. LCCN 24031380.
- —— (1899). "'Real,' 'True,' or 'Genuine' in Indian Languages". American Anthropologist. I. New York: G. P. Putnam's Sons.
