= Battle of Fisher's Hill =

Battle of the American Civil War

- Part of the American Civil War
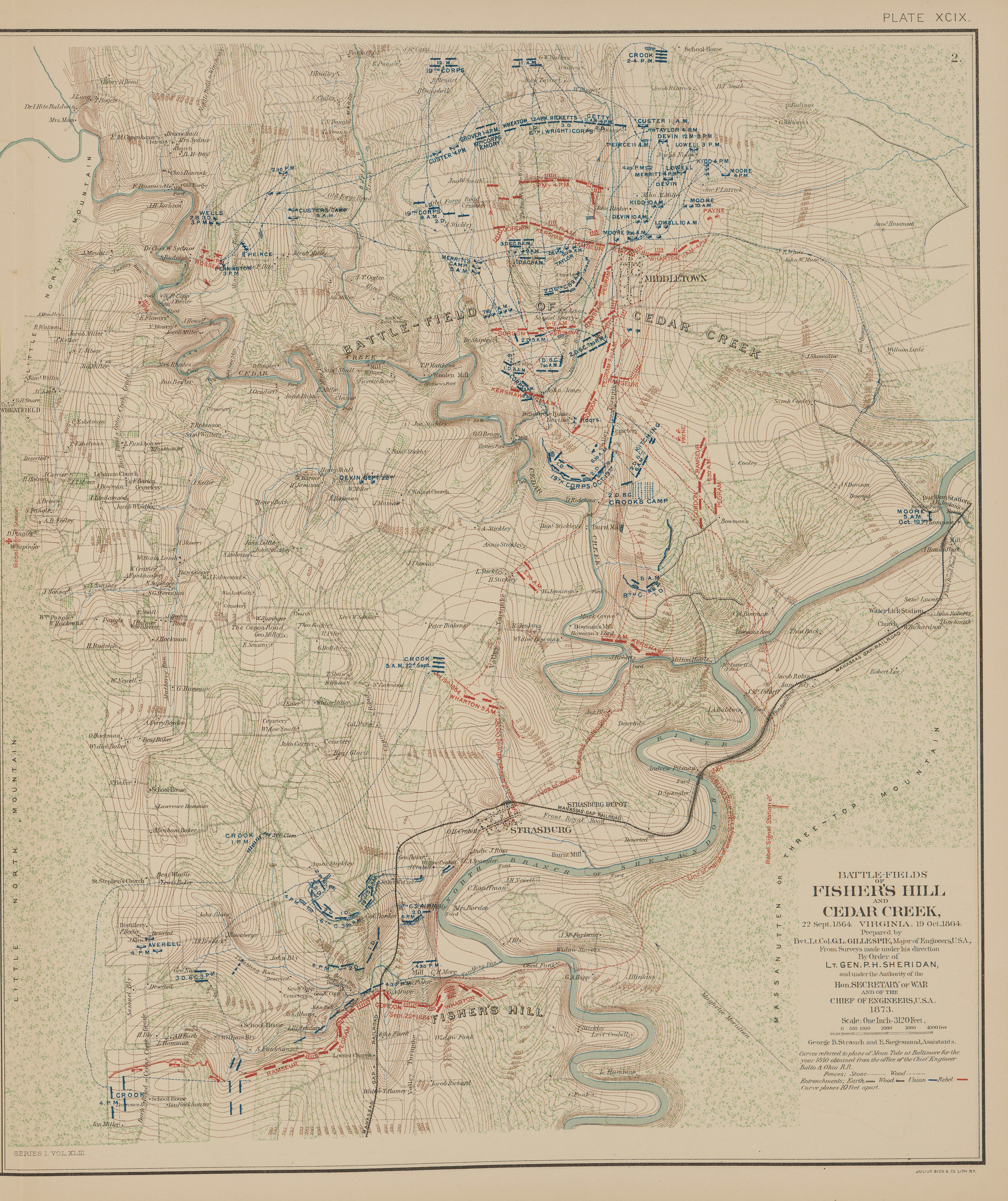
- Battlefields of Fisher's Hill and Cedar Creek, VA
Date	September 21-22, 1864
Location	Shenandoah County, Virginia 38.9838°N 78.3959°W
Result	Union victory

Belligerents
United States (Union)	(Confederate States of America) CSA (Confederacy)

Commanders and leaders
Philip H. Sheridan	Jubal Early

Units involved
Army of the Shenandoah	Army of the Valley

Strength
~35,000 ("present for duty"); 29,444 (engaged)	9,500

Casualties and losses
528	1,234

The Battle of Fisher's Hill was fought September 21–22, 1864, near Strasburg, Virginia, as part of the Valley Campaigns of 1864 during the American Civil War. Despite its strong defensive position, the Confederate army of Lt. Gen. Jubal Early was defeated by the Union Army of the Shenandoah, commanded by Maj. Gen. Philip Sheridan.

== Background ==
=== Military situation ===
Sheridan had almost 35,000 men in the Shenandoah Valley opposing Early, with just under 10,000. Early, following the Third Battle of Winchester, took a strong position. His right rested on the North Branch of the Shenandoah River. The left flank of his infantry was on Fisher's Hill. Confederate cavalry was expected to hold the ground from there to Little North Mountain. Maj. Gen. George Crook advised Sheridan to flank this position. His command was assigned to move along the wooded slopes of the mountain to attack the cavalry.

== Battle ==
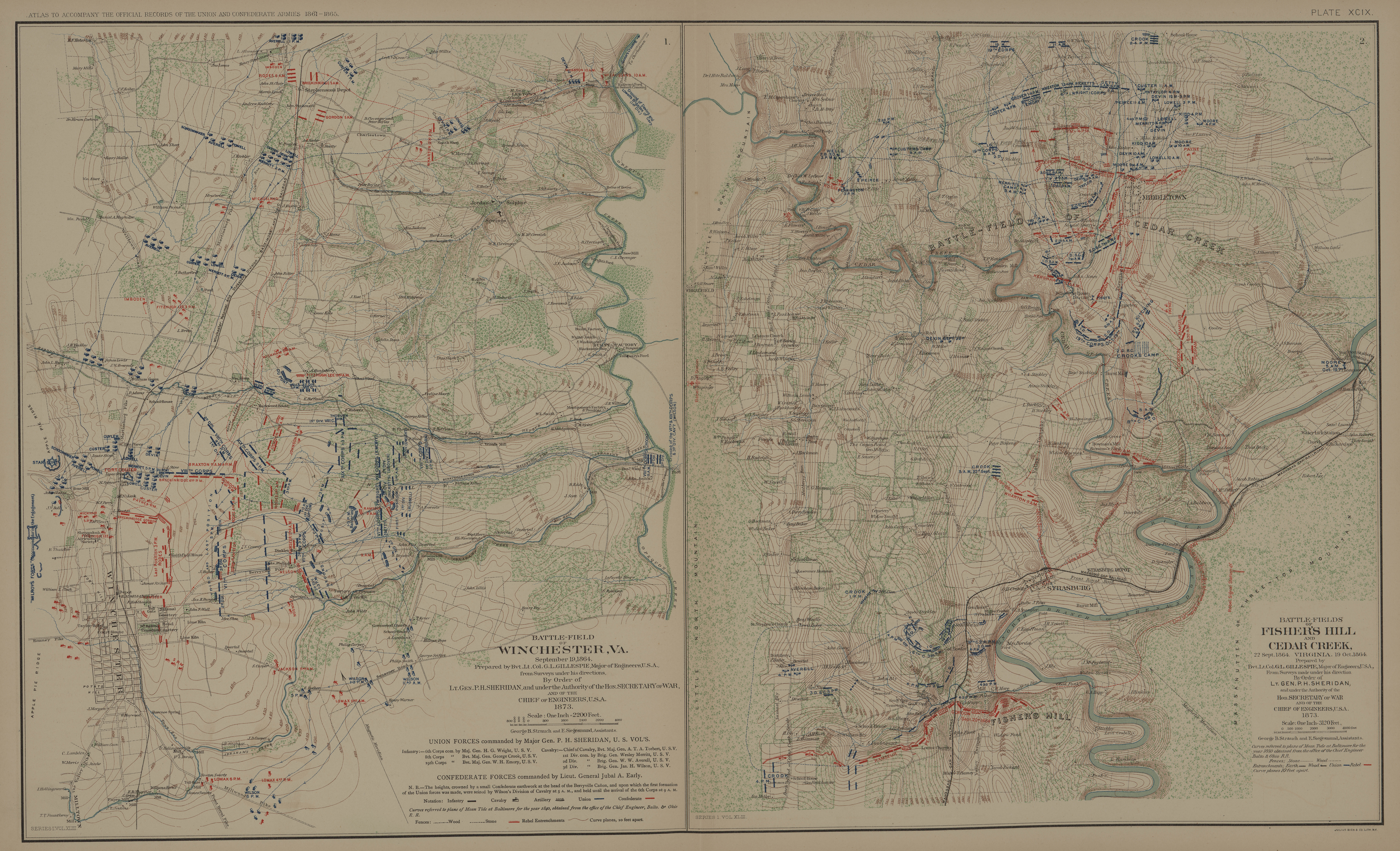
Side by side atlas maps of the Battles of Fisher's Hill and Cedar Creek

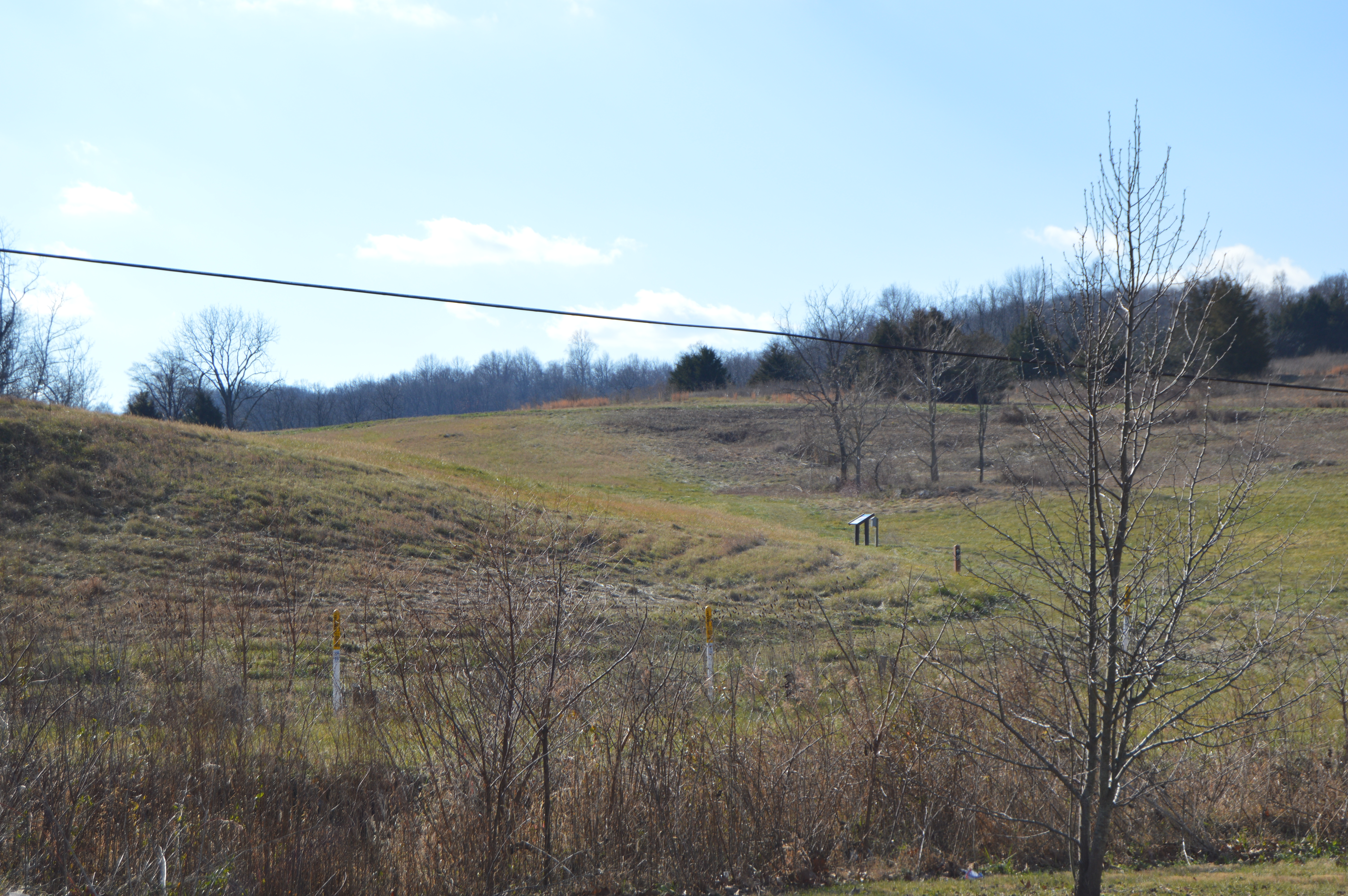
Section of the battlefield pictured in 2016

Crook's attack began about 4 p.m. on September 22, 1864. The infantry attack pushed the Confederate troopers out of their way. Maj. Gen. Stephen Dodson Ramseur tried refusing the left flank of his division. Crook and Brig. Gen. James B. Ricketts's division, of Horatio G. Wright's VI Corps struck Ramseur's line, pushing it in. Wright's remaining divisions and XIX Corps broke the Southern line.

== Aftermath ==
The Confederates fell back to Waynesboro, Virginia. Brig. Gen. Alfred Torbert was sent into the Luray Valley with 6,000 cavalrymen to force his way through the 1,200 Confederate cavalrymen under Brigadier General Williams Wickham. Torbert was then supposed to move through the New Market and Luray Gap in Massanutten Mountain and come up behind Early and cut-off his retreat at Fisher's Hill. Torbert fell back after making a token effort against Wickham's force at Milford (present day Overall) and Early escaped.

Four Union Army enlisted men and one officer received the Medal of Honor in the action at Fisher's Hill.

- Private James Connors, 43rd New York Infantry
- Private John Creed, 23rd Illinois Infantry
- Private George G. Moore, 11th West Virginia Infantry
- Sergeant Sylvester D. Rhodes, 61st Pennsylvania Infantry
- First Lieutenant Edward N. Whittier, 5th Battery Maine Light Artillery

== Battlefield preservation ==
The Civil War Trust (a division of the American Battlefield Trust) and its partners have acquired and preserved 362 acres (1.46 km^{2}) of the battlefield. The preserved portion of the battlefield is marked by trails and interpretive signs.

== See also ==
- Troop engagements of the American Civil War, 1864
- List of costliest American Civil War land battles
- List of American Civil War battles
- Army of West Virginia
- Jackson's Valley Campaign
