= Bill Hallman =

Bill Hallman may refer to:

- Bill Hallman (second baseman) (1867–1920), American Major League player
- Bill Hallman (outfielder) (1876–1950), American baseball player
