= Milton Matthews =

- Born: Pittsburgh, Pennsylvania, US
- Died: April 11, 1896
- Military career
- Allegiance: United States
- Branch: United States Army; Union Army
- Rank: Private
- Units: Company C, 61st Pennsylvania Infantry
- Conflicts: Third Battle of Petersburg; American Civil War
- Awards: Medal of Honor

Milton Matthews (died April 11, 1896) was an American soldier who fought in the American Civil War. Matthews received his country's highest award for bravery during combat, the Medal of Honor. Matthews's medal was won for capturing the flag of the 7th Tennessee Infantry at the Third Battle of Petersburg, Virginia. He was one of six members of the regiment to earn that award that day. He was honored with the award on May 10, 1865. Matthews was born in Pittsburgh, where he entered the service, and died in Milwaukee.

== Medal of Honor citation ==
The President of the United States of America, in the name of Congress, takes pleasure in presenting the Medal of Honor to Private Milton Matthews, United States Army, for extraordinary heroism on 2 April 1865, while serving with Company C, 61st Pennsylvania Infantry, in action at Petersburg, Virginia, for capture of flag of 7th Tennessee Infantry (Confederate States of America).

== See also ==
- List of American Civil War Medal of Honor recipients
- 61st Pennsylvania Infantry Regiment
- Third Battle of Petersburg

== Bibliography ==
- Beyer, Walter F.; Beyer, Oscar F. (1905). Deeds of valor : How America's Civil War heroes won the Congressional Medal of Honor. Vol. I. Detroit, MI: The Perrien-Keydel Company. p. 612. hdl:2027/nyp.33433081908182. OCLC 1148790472.
- Brewer, Abraham Titus (1911). History Sixty-First Regiment Pennsylvania Folunteers, 1861-1865 (pdf) (1st ed.). Pittsburgh, PA: Pittsburgh, Art Engraving & Printing Co. pp. 134–135, 156, 230. OCLC 276860166.
- Subcommittee on Veterans' Affairs, United States. Congress. Senate. Committee on Labor and Public Welfare (1968). Edward M Kennedy, Chairman (ed.). Medal of Honor, 1863–1968 : "In the Name of the Congress of the United States". Committee print (United States. Congress), 90th Congress, 2nd session. Washington DC: U.S. Government Printing Office. p. 160. OCLC 1049691780.
- Wallace, Lew (1897). The story of American heroism (PDF) (1st ed.). Springfield, OH: J.W. Jones. p. 466. OCLC 276860166.
- "Milton Matthews". Congressional Medal of Honor Society. Congressional Medal of Honor Society. February 22, 2022.
- "Milton Matthews". The Wall of Valor Project. Hall of Valor: The Military Medals Database. August 8, 2020.
- "Milton Matthews". Medal of Honor Recipients. The Comprehensive Guide to the Victoria & George Cross. December 15, 2015.
- "Pennsylvania Volunteers of the Civil War". Pennsylvania Civil War Volunteers. January 1, 2015.
