= Jack Lapp =

American baseball player (1884–1920)

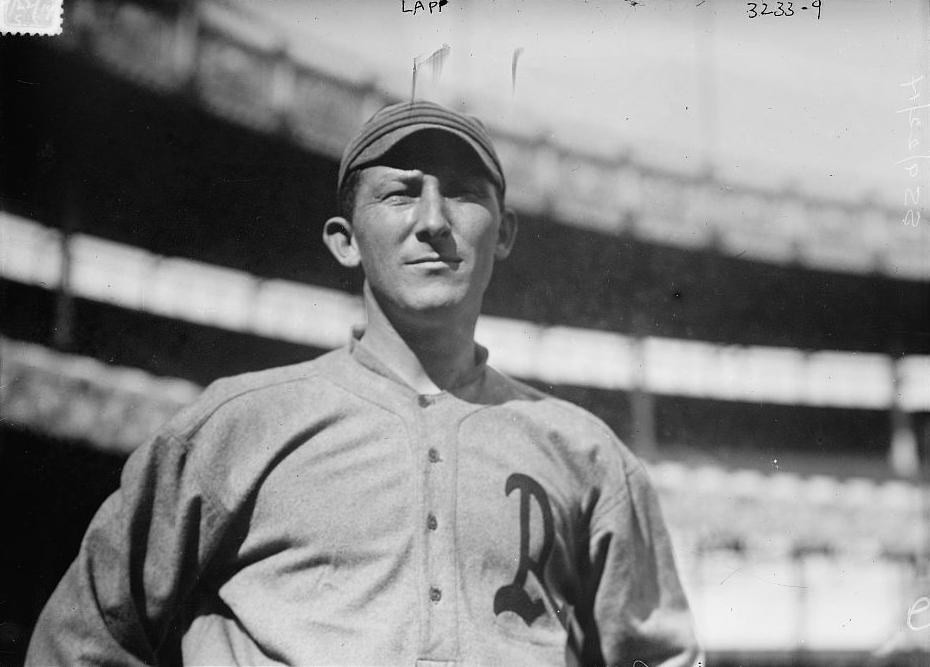
- Catcher
- Born: September 10, 1884; Frazer, Pennsylvania, U.S.
- Died: February 6, 1920 (aged 35); Philadelphia, Pennsylvania, U.S.
- Batted: Left Threw: Right

MLB debut
- September 11, 1908, for the Philadelphia Athletics

Last MLB appearance
- October 1, 1916, for the Chicago White Sox

MLB statistics
- Batting average: .263
- Home runs: 5
- Runs batted in: 166
- Stats at Baseball Reference

Teams
- Philadelphia Athletics (1908–1915); Chicago White Sox (1916)

Career highlights and awards
- 3x World Series champion (1910, 1911, 1913)

John Walker Lapp (September 10, 1884 – February 6, 1920) was an American professional baseball catcher. He played in Major League Baseball (MLB) from 1908 through 1916 for the Philadelphia Athletics and Chicago White Sox.

== Baseball career ==
Lapp was a second or third-string catcher for eight of his nine years in the big leagues (seven with Philadelphia and one with Chicago). He did catch 503 games in his career, so he wasn't exactly "riding the pines" for all those years.

In 1911, the Athletics' first-string catcher was Ira Thomas, with Paddy Livingston and Lapp backing him up. Philadelphia played the New York Giants in the 1911 World Series, which went six games with the A's winning. Thomas caught the first two games and was "slightly injured" in the 7th inning of Game 2. Livingston, who had been a key figure during the regular season, was suffering from injuries to his legs, arms, and hands. He did not play in the Series.

Lapp was called on to catch Game 3 on October 17, 1911, which lasted 11 innings. He set a record for catcher in a single game, catching base stealers with five, and he also had 14 putouts. Thomas came back to catch Game 4, a nine-inning affair that had Thomas limping by the end. Lapp was assigned to catch Game 5 (10/25/1911), which lasted 10 innings. He "only" caught one base stealer and had four putouts in that game. Thomas caught Game 6 for a Philadelphia series victory.

The next year (1912), Lapp split catching duties with Thomas and Ben Egan, but Lapp caught the majority of the games (83).

In 567 games over nine seasons, Lapp posted a .263 batting average (416-for-1581) with 168 runs, 5 home runs and 166 RBI. He finished his career with a .969 fielding percentage playing primarily at catcher and first base. In five World Series games, he hit .235 (4-for-17) with one run and one RBI. He was a member of three world championship teams with the Philadelphia Athletics (1910, 1911 and 1913).

After battling influenza for several weeks, Lapp died on February 6, 1920, of pneumonia and is interred at Mount Peace Cemetery in Philadelphia, Pennsylvania.

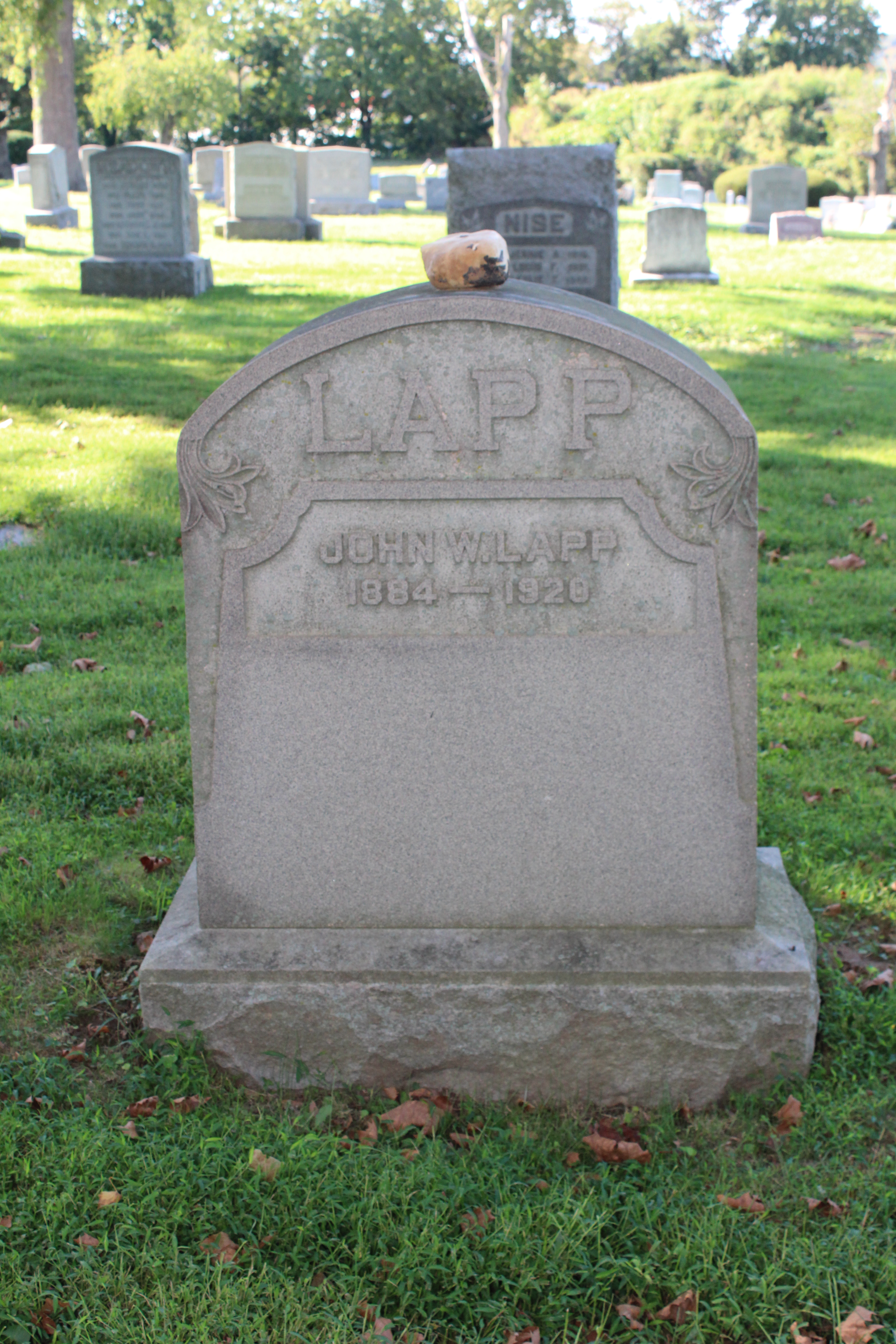
Jack Lapp Gravestone in Mount Peace Cemetery
