= Charles H. Clausen =

American soldier in the American Civil War

- Born: September 22, 1842; Philadelphia, Pennsylvania
- Died: August 15, 1922 (aged 79); Philadelphia, Pennsylvania
- Burial place: Mount Peace Cemetery, Philadelphia, Pennsylvania
- Military career
- Allegiance: United States of America
- Branch: United States Army; Union Army
- Service years: 1861 - 1865
- Rank: Captain
- Unit: 61st Regiment, Pennsylvania Volunteer Infantry - Company H
- Conflicts: Battle of Spotsylvania Court House
- Awards: Medal of Honor

Charles H. Clausen (September 22, 1842 – August 15, 1922) was an American soldier who fought in the American Civil War. Clausen received the country's highest award for bravery during combat, the Medal of Honor, for his action during the Battle of Spotsylvania Court House in Virginia on 12 May 1864. He was honored with the award on 25 June 1892.

== Biography ==
Clausen was born in Philadelphia, Pennsylvania, on 22 September 1842. He enlisted into the 17th Pennsylvania Infantry. While in this unit he was involved in battles at Washington, D.C., and along the Potomac in Virginia. After the expiration of the three-month service in the 17th Infantry he mustered into 61st Pennsylvania Infantry on 21 August 1861 as first sergeant. He was later promoted to first sergeant. While serving in this capacity he was involved in the Battle of Spotsylvania Court House in Virginia. It was during this battle that he performed the act of gallantry that earned him the Medal of Honor. He was wounded during this battle but returned to his battalion as captain and then commander in October 1864. On 10 February 1865 he eventually resigned from active service due to his injuries.

Clausen died on 15 August 1922 and his remains are interred at the Mount Peace Cemetery in Philadelphia.

== Medal of Honor citation ==
Although severely wounded, he led the regiment against the enemy, under a terrific fire, and saved a battery from capture.

== See also ==
- List of American Civil War Medal of Honor recipients: A–F
