= Robert Ralston (philanthropist) =

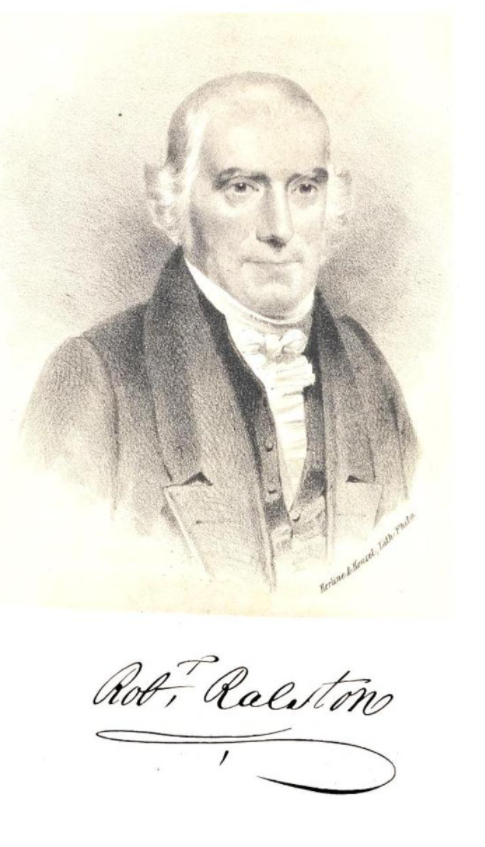
Robert Ralston

Robert Ralston (1761 Little Brandywine, Pennsylvania – 11 August 1836 Philadelphia) was a merchant and philanthropist.

== Biography ==
He became a merchant at an early age, and amassed a large fortune in the East Indian trade, which he spent liberally in benevolent enterprises. He contributed largely to the establishment of the Widows' and Orphans' Asylum and the Mariner's Church in Philadelphia, founded the Pennsylvania Bible Society (then called the 'Bible Society at Philadelphia'), which was the first Bible society in North America, and in 1819 became first president of the board of education of the Presbyterian church.

His colonial estate in Philadelphia became the location of Mount Vernon Cemetery and Mount Peace Cemetery.

The Robert Ralston School was added to the National Register of Historic Places in 1986.
