= Robert Ralston School =

- U.S. National Register of Historic Places
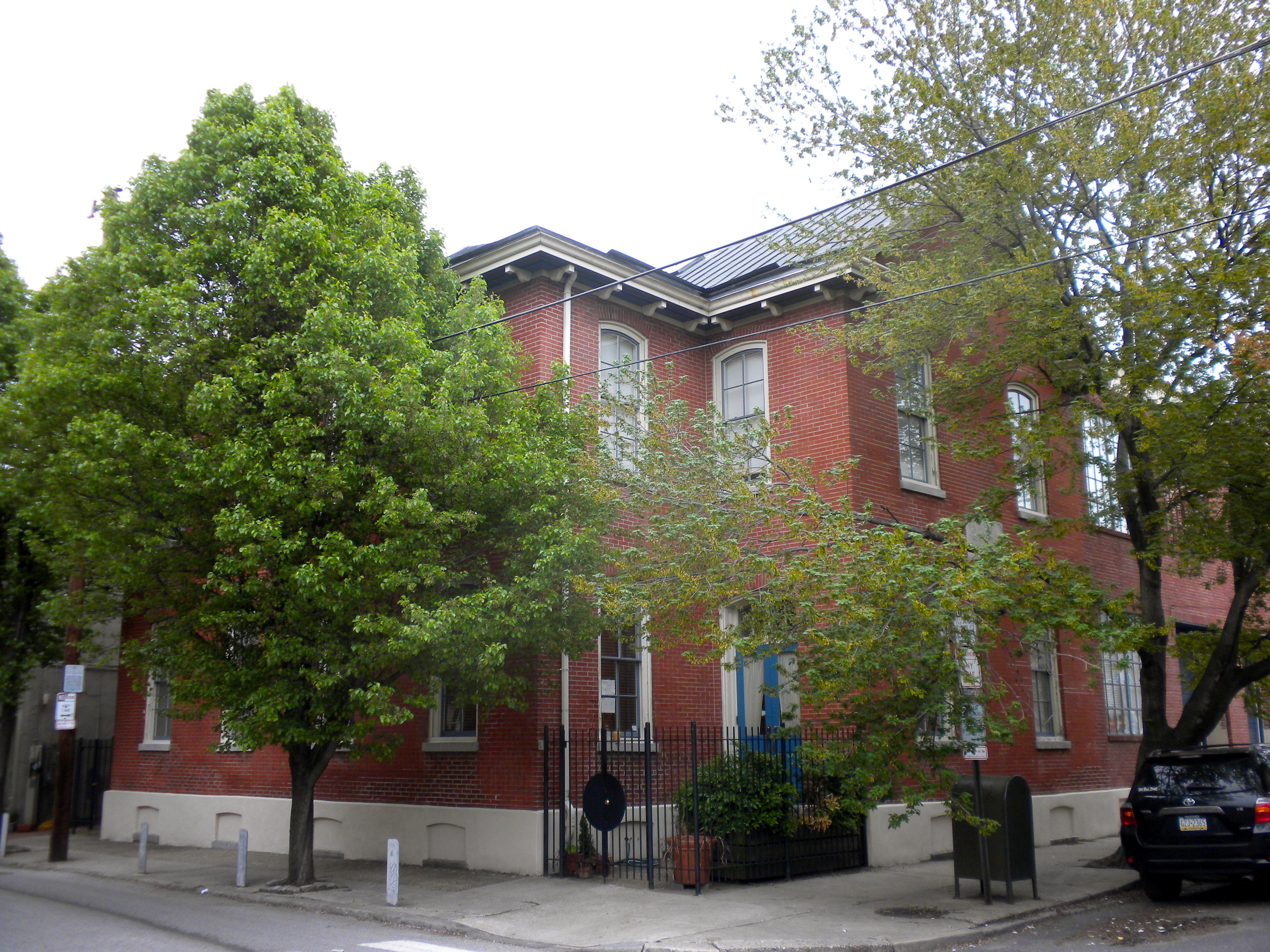
- Robert Ralston School, April 2010

- Location within Philadelphia Location within Pennsylvania Location within the United States
- Location: 221 Bainbridge Street, Philadelphia, Pennsylvania
- Coordinates: 39°56′26″N 75°8′48″W
- Area: less than one acre
- Built: 1869
- Built by: G. Brinkworth
- Architect: Louis H. Esler
- Architectural style: Vernacular Gothic
- MPS: Philadelphia Public Schools TR
- NRHP reference No.: 86003321
- Added to NRHP: December 4, 1986

The Robert Ralston School is a historic American school building in the Queen Village neighborhood of Philadelphia, Pennsylvania.

The building was added to the National Register of Historic Places in 1986.

== History and architectural features ==
Built in 1869, this historic structure is a 2 1/2-story, four-bay, brick building with a stucco foundation that was designed in the Gothic Revival style. It has a later addition in an industrial style. It features a pedimented front gable, a molded wood cornice, and an ocular vent opening. It was named after merchant and philanthropist Robert Ralston (1761–1836).
