= John W. Comfort =

United States Army Medal of Honor recipient (1842–1893)

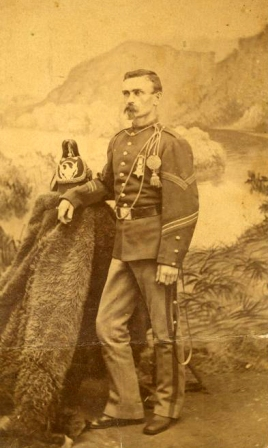
- John Comfort in dress uniform and displaying his Medal of Honor, c. 1877
- Born: c. 1844; Philadelphia, Pennsylvania, United States
- Died: November 26, 1893 (aged 49); Philadelphia, Pennsylvania, US
- Burial place: Mount Peace Cemetery
- Military career
- Allegiance: United States of America; Union
- Branch: United States Army; Union Army
- Service years: 1861–1892
- Rank: Corporal
- Unit: 4th U.S. Cavalry
- Conflicts: American Civil War; Indian Wars; Texas–Indian Wars
- Awards: Medal of Honor

John W. Comfort (c. 1844 – November 29, 1893) was an American soldier in the U.S. Army who fought during the American Civil War and the Indian Wars from 1861 until his retirement in 1892. He was a member of the 4th U.S. Cavalry during the Texas–Indian Wars and, while battling the Kiowa and Comanche in the Staked Plains in November 1874, killed a Native American in armed combat. He was one of several soldiers cited for bravery in this battle and received the Medal of Honor the following year.

== Biography ==
John W. Comfort was born in Philadelphia, Pennsylvania, in about 1844. At the start of the American Civil War, the 17-year-old Comfort joined up with the 29th Pennsylvania Volunteer Infantry on June 20, 1861. He immediately reenlisted while stationed in Hamilton County, Tennessee in December 1862, weeks after the Battle of Wauhatchie, and was promoted to the rank of sergeant at the end of the month. Comfort saw continuous action around Chattanooga, Tennessee and in Georgia, including the sieges of Atlanta and Savannah, as well as the Carolinas. After the war's end, Comfort was honorably discharged on July 17, 1865. He decided on a career in the military, however, and enlisted in the Regular United States Army four months after leaving the volunteer service.

Comfort was initially assigned to Battery K of the 1st U.S. Artillery in Brownsville, Texas and spent the next three years in the Southern United States during Reconstruction before being discharged at Greenville, Louisiana on November 28, 1868. After returning to Philadelphia for a time, he reenlisted again on April 18, 1870. He was sent to the Texas frontier where he served with the 4th U.S. Cavalry in San Antonio and Fort Richardson. He became an experienced Indian fighter during the Texas–Indian Wars reaching the rank of sergeant. On November 5, 1874, while his regiment was battling the Kiowa and Comanche near Lake Tahokay in the Staked Plains, Comfort was separated from his unit and killed an Indian in armed combat. He was commended by his commanding officer, Colonel Ranald S. Mackenzie, who wrote "that Corporal Comfort ran down and killed an Indian on the Staked Plains with no other soldier within a long distance of him...This man is a very distinguished soldier for personal gallantry". He was recommended for, and received, the Medal of Honor on October 13, 1875. Though discharged from Fort Clark (near present-day Brackettville, Texas) on June 26, 1878, he remained in the army until his retirement in 1892, and afterwards served in Batteries E and A of the 1st U.S. Regular Artillery. Comfort died in Philadelphia on November 29, 1893, and interred at Mount Peace Cemetery.

Comfort's life was later profiled by historian Merle Olmsted in the Winter 1968 issue of Military Collector & Historian.

== Medal of Honor citation ==
Rank and organization: Corporal, Company A, 4th U.S. Cavalry. Place and date: At Staked Plains, Tex., November 5, 1874. Entered service at: ------. Birth: Philadelphia, Pa. Date of issue: October 13, 1875.

Citation:

Ran down and killed an Indian.

== See also ==
- List of Medal of Honor recipients
