= Page County Bridge No. 1990 =

- U.S. National Register of Historic Places
- Virginia Landmarks Register
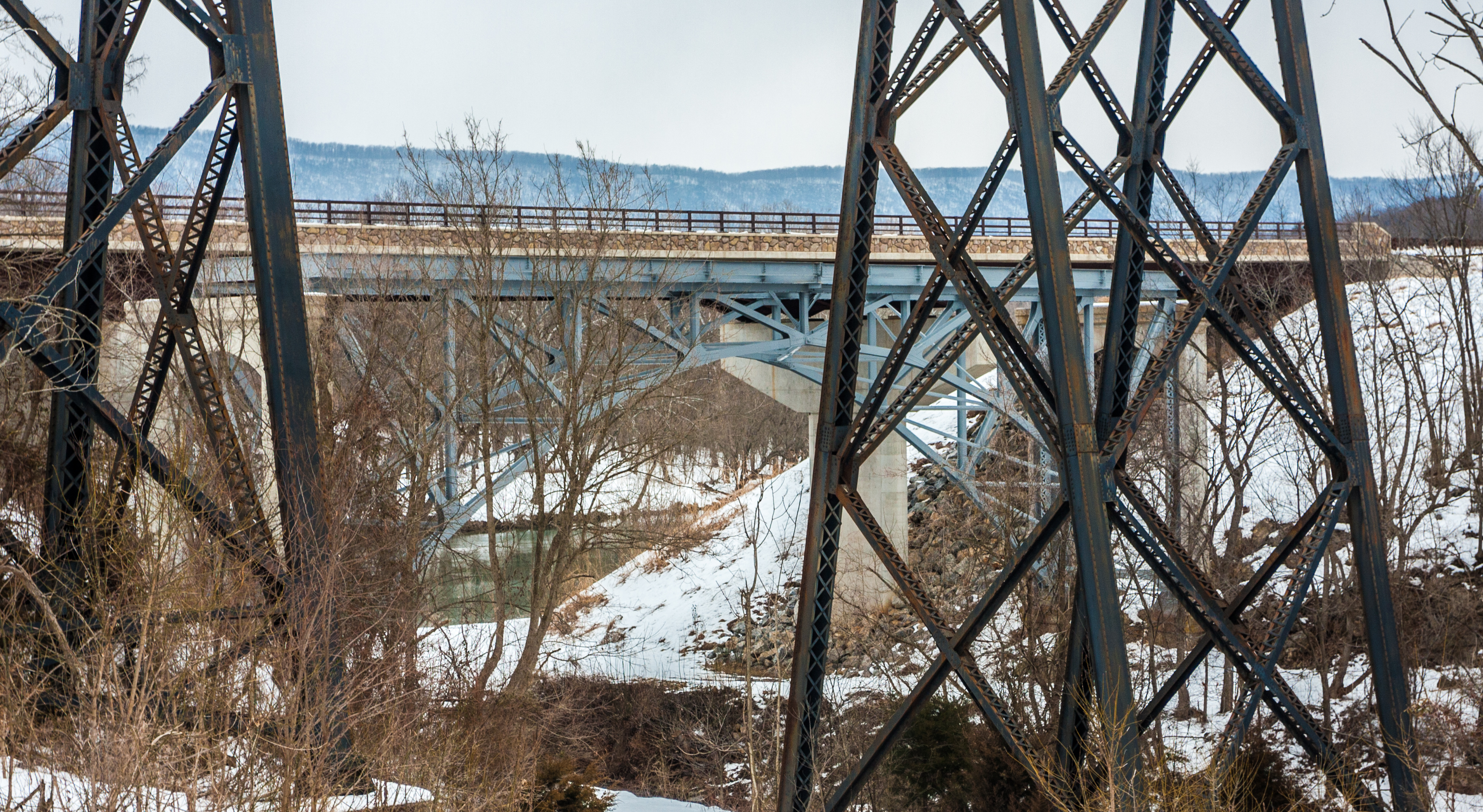
- Page County Bridge No. 1990, February 2014

- Location within Virginia Location within the United States
- Location: US 340 at Overall Run, Overall, Virginia
- Coordinates: 38°48′22″N 78°20′57″W
- Area: 0.3 acres (0.12 ha)
- Built: 1938
- Built by: Virginia Department of Highways
- Architectural style: Pratt truss deck arch
- NRHP reference No.: 08000423
- VLR No.: 069-0238

Significant dates
- Added to NRHP: May 15, 2008
- Designated VLR: March 20, 2008

The bridge deck seen prior to the removal of asphalt, in 2009.

Page County Bridge No. 1990, also known as Overall Bridge, is a historic Pratt deck arch truss bridge located at Overall, Page County, Virginia. It was built in 1938, and is a single-span Pratt deck arch metal truss bridge with four "T"-beam concrete approach spans. It is approximately 123 feet long and the entire bridge length is approximately 245 feet.

It was listed on the National Register of Historic Places in 2008.
