= Joseph Fisher (soldier) =

American Civil War soldier and Medal of Honor recipient

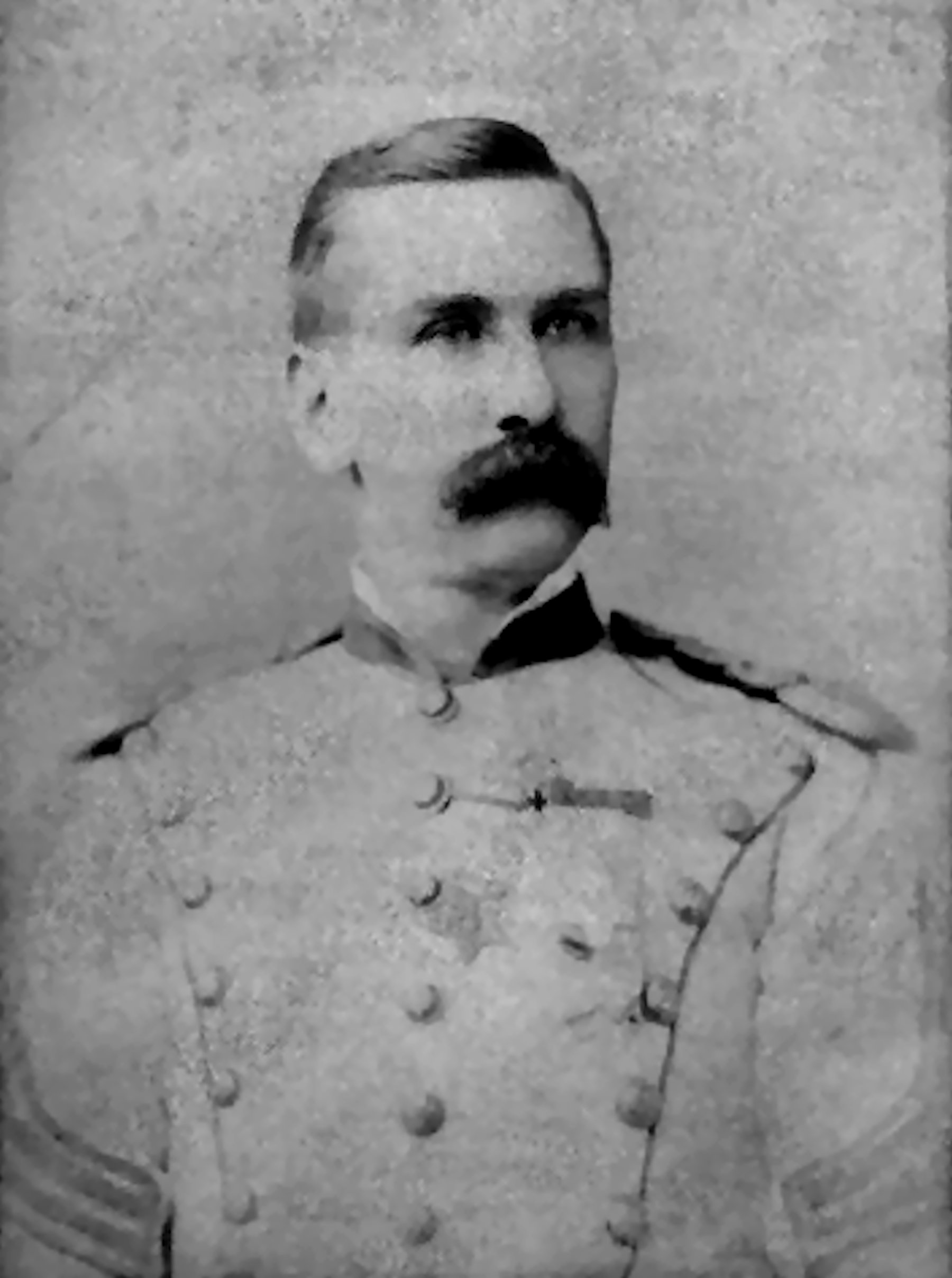
- Medal of Honor winner Joseph Fisher c1897
- Born: August 24, 1843; Philadelphia, Pennsylvania, US
- Died: October 8, 1903 (aged 60); Lansdowne, Pennsylvania, US
- Burial place: Fernwood Cemetery; Lansdowne, Pennsylvania, US
- Military career
- Allegiance: United States of America
- Branch: United States Army; Union Army
- Service years: April 21, 1861 to 1865
- Rank: Corporal
- Units: Company C, 61st Pennsylvania Infantry
- Conflicts: Third Battle of Petersburg
- Awards: Medal of Honor

Joseph Fisher (August 24, 1843 – October 8, 1903) was an American soldier who fought in the American Civil War. Fisher received the United States' highest award for bravery during combat, the Medal of Honor, for his action during the Third Battle of Petersburg in Virginia on April 2, 1865. He was honored with the award on January 16, 1894.

== Biography ==
Fisher was born in Philadelphia, Pennsylvania, on August 24, 1843. He first enlisted into a three-month service with the 23rd Pennsylvania Volunteer Infantry in April 1861. After mustering out, he reentered the service in September 1861, joining the 61st Pennsylvania Infantry. He went on to be promoted to corporal and, on April 2, 1865, performed the act of gallantry that earned him the Medal of Honor.

Fisher died on October 8, 1903, and his remains are interred at Fernwood Cemetery in Lansdowne, Pennsylvania.

== Medal of Honor citation ==
The President of the United States of America, in the name of Congress, takes pleasure in presenting the Medal of Honor to Corporal Joseph Fisher, United States Army, for extraordinary heroism on 2 April 1865, while serving with Company C, 61st Pennsylvania Infantry, in action at Petersburg, Virginia. Corporal Fisher carried the colors 50 yards in advance of his regiment, and after being painfully wounded attempted to crawl into the enemy's works in an endeavor to plant his flag thereon.

== See also ==
- List of American Civil War Medal of Honor recipients: A–F
