= James Connors (Medal of Honor) =

Recipient of the Medal of Honor

- Born: c. 1838; Kildare, Ireland
- Military career
- Allegiance: United States
- Branch: United States Army; Union Army
- Service years: 1861 - 1865
- Rank: Private
- Unit: (New York (state)) 43rd Regiment, New York Volunteer Infantry
- Conflicts: American Civil War • Battle of Fisher's Hill
- Awards: Medal of Honor

James Connors (c. 1838 – unknown) was an Irish born Union Army soldier during the American Civil War. He received the Medal of Honor for gallantry during the Battle of Fisher's Hill near Strasburg, Virginia fought 21–22 September 1864. The battle was one of the engagements of the Valley Campaigns of 1864.

Connors enlisted in the Army from Canajoharie, New York in August 1861, and mustered out with his regiment in June 1865.

== Medal of Honor citation ==
"The President of the United States of America, in the name of Congress, takes pleasure in presenting the Medal of Honor to Private James Connors, United States Army, for extraordinary heroism on 22 September 1864, while serving with Company E, 43d New York Infantry, in action at Fisher's Hill, Virginia, for capture of flag."

== See also ==
- List of Medal of Honor recipients
- List of American Civil War Medal of Honor recipients: A–F
