= 61st Pennsylvania Infantry Regiment =

Union Army infantry regiment

61st Regiment, Pennsylvania Volunteer Infantry
- Active: September 7, 1861 – June 28, 1865
- Country: United States of America
- Allegiance: Union
- Branch: Infantry
- Engagements: Siege of Yorktown; Battle of Williamsburg; Battle of Seven Pines; Seven Days Battles; Battle of Gaines's Mill; Battle of White Oak Swamp; Battle of Malvern Hill; Battle of Chantilly; Battle of Antietam; Battle of Fredericksburg; Battle of Chancellorsville; Battle of Gettysburg; Bristoe Campaign; Mine Run Campaign; Battle of the Wilderness; Battle of Spotsylvania Court House; Battle of North Anna; Battle of Totopotomoy Creek; Battle of Cold Harbor; Siege of Petersburg; Battle of Fort Stevens; Third Battle of Winchester; Battle of Fisher's Hill; Battle of Cedar Creek; Appomattox Campaign; Third Battle of Petersburg; Battle of Appomattox Court House

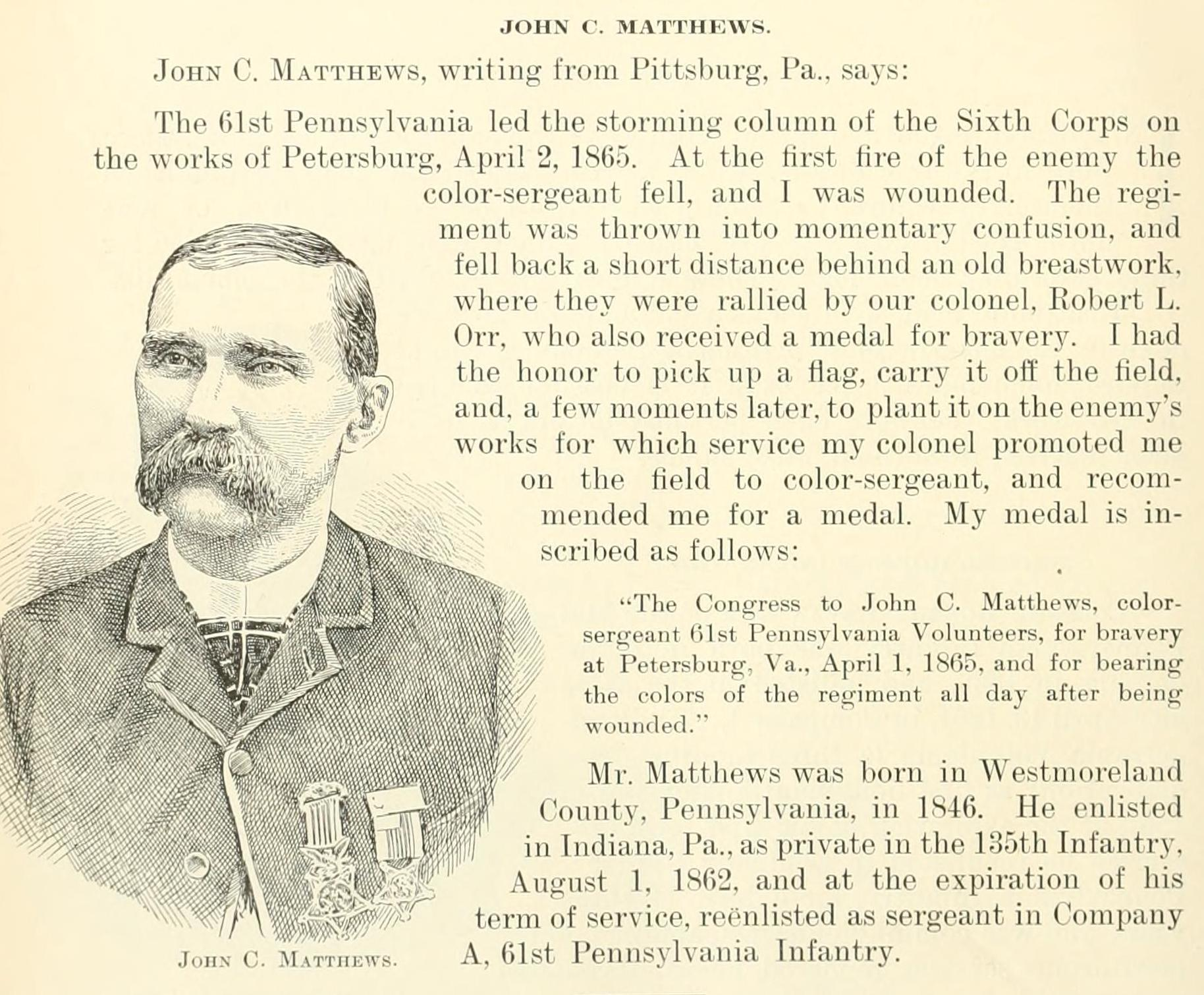
John Calvin Matthews of the 61st Pennsylvania Infantry, Civil War Congressional Medal of Honor recipient

The 61st Regiment, Pennsylvania Volunteer Infantry was an infantry regiment that served in the Union Army during the American Civil War.

== Service ==
The 61st Pennsylvania was organized at Pittsburgh, Pennsylvania in August 1861 and mustered in for a three year enlistment under the command of Colonel Oliver H. Rippey.

The regiment was attached to Jameson's Brigade, Heintzelman's Division, Army of the Potomac, to February 1862. Graham's Brigade, Couch's Division, Army of the Potomac, to March 1862. 2nd Brigade, 1st Division, IV Corps, Army of the Potomac, to July 1862. 3rd Brigade, 1st Division, IV Corps, to September 1862. 2nd Brigade, 3rd Division, VI Corps, to October 1862. 1st Brigade, 3rd Division, VI Corps, to February 1863. Light Brigade, VI Corps, to May 1863. 3rd Brigade, 2nd Division, VI Corps, Army of the Potomac, to July 1864. Army of the Shenandoah to December 1864, and Army of the Potomac to June 1865.

The 61st Pennsylvania Infantry mustered out June 28, 1865.

== Detailed service ==
Ordered to Washington, D.C. Duty in the defenses of Washington, D. C., until March 1862. Reconnaissance to Pohick Church and Occoquan River November 12, 1861. Advance on Manassas, Va., March 10–15, 1862. Reconnaissance to Gainesville March 20. Moved to the Peninsula, Va., March 26. Siege of Yorktown April 5-May 4. Battle of Williamsburg May 5. Operations about Bottom's Bridge May 20–23. Battle of Seven Pines, May 31-June 1. Seven Days before Richmond June 25-July 1. Seven Pines June 27. White Oak Swamp and Charles City Cross Roads June 30. Malvern Hill July 1. At Harrison's Landing until August 16. Reconnaissance to Malvern Hill August 5–7. Movement to Alexandria, then to Chantilly August 16–30. Chantilly September 1. Maryland Campaign September 6–24. Battle of Antietam September 16–17. Williamsport September 19–20. Duty in Maryland and on the Potomac until November. Movement to Falmouth, Va., November 1–19. Battle of Fredericksburg December 12–15. Burnside's 2nd Campaign, "Mud March," January 20–24, 1863. At Falmouth until April. Chancellorsville Campaign April 27-May 6. Operations at Franklin's Crossing April 29-May 2. Maryes Heights, Fredericksburg, May 3. Salem Heights May 3–4. Banks' Ford May 4. Operations about Deep Run Ravine June 6–13. Battle Of Gettysburg July 2–4. South Mountain, Md., July 6. Duty on line of the Rappahannock and Rapidan until October. Bristoe Campaign October 9–22. Advance to line of the Rappahannock November 7–8. Rappahannock Station November 7. Mine Run Campaign November 26-December 2. At Brandy Station until April 1864. Rapidan Campaign May 4-June 12. Battle of the Wilderness May 5–7. Parker's Store May 5. Spotsylvania May 8–12. Spottsylvania Court House May 12–21. Assault on the Salient May 12. North Anna River May 23–26. Line of the Pamunkey May 26–28. Totopotomoy May 28–31. Cold Harbor June 1–12. Before Petersburg June 17–19. Siege of Petersburg until July 9. Jerusalem Plank Road June 22–23. Moved to Washington, D.C., July 9–11. Repulse of Early's attack on Fort Stevens and the northern defenses of Washington July 11–12. Pursuit of Early to Snicker's Gap July 14–19. Sheridan's Shenandoah Valley Campaign August to December. Charlestown August 21. Gilbert's Ford, Opequan Creek, September 13. Third Battle of Winchester, September 19. Fisher's Hill September 22. Battle of Cedar Creek October 19. Duty in the Shenandoah Valley until December. Ordered to Petersburg, Va., December 1. Siege of Petersburg December 1864 to April 1865. Fort Fisher, Petersburg, March 25, 1865. Appomattox Campaign March 28-April 9. Assault on and fall of Petersburg April 2. Pursuit of Lee April 3–9. Appomattox Court House April 9. Surrender of Lee and his army. March to Danville April 23–29, and duty there until May 23. Moved to Richmond, Va., then to Washington, D.C. Corps Review June 8.

== Casualties ==
The regiment lost a total of 338 men during service; 19 officers and 218 enlisted men killed or mortally wounded, 1 officer and 100 enlisted men died of disease.

== Commanders ==
- Colonel Oliver H. Rippey - killed in action at the Battle of Seven Pines
- Colonel George C. Spear - killed in action at the Battle of Chancellorsville
- Colonel George Fairlamb Smith - mustered out September 7, 1864 on the expiration of his enlistment; recommissioned September 29, 1864 and discharged April 20, 1865 by special order
- Colonel Robert L. Orr

== Notable members ==
- 1st Sergeant Charles H. Clausen, Company H - Medal of Honor recipient for action at the Battle of Spotsylvania Court House
- Corporal Joseph Fisher, Company C - Medal of Honor recipient for action at the Third Battle of Petersburg
- Private Milton Matthews, Company C - Medal of Honor recipient for action at the Third Battle of Petersburg
- Sergeant Sylvester D. Rhodes, Company D - Medal of Honor recipient for action at the Battle of Fisher's Hill
- Lieutenant Colonel John W. Crosby - Originally served as the Captain of Company G. Promoted to major on April 22, 1864 and lieutenant colonel on February 22, 1865. Killed at the Third Battle of Petersburg on April 2, 1865.^{:416}

== See also ==
- List of Pennsylvania Civil War Units
- Pennsylvania in the Civil War
