= Milford Battlefield =

- U.S. National Register of Historic Places
- U.S. Historic district
- Virginia Landmarks Register
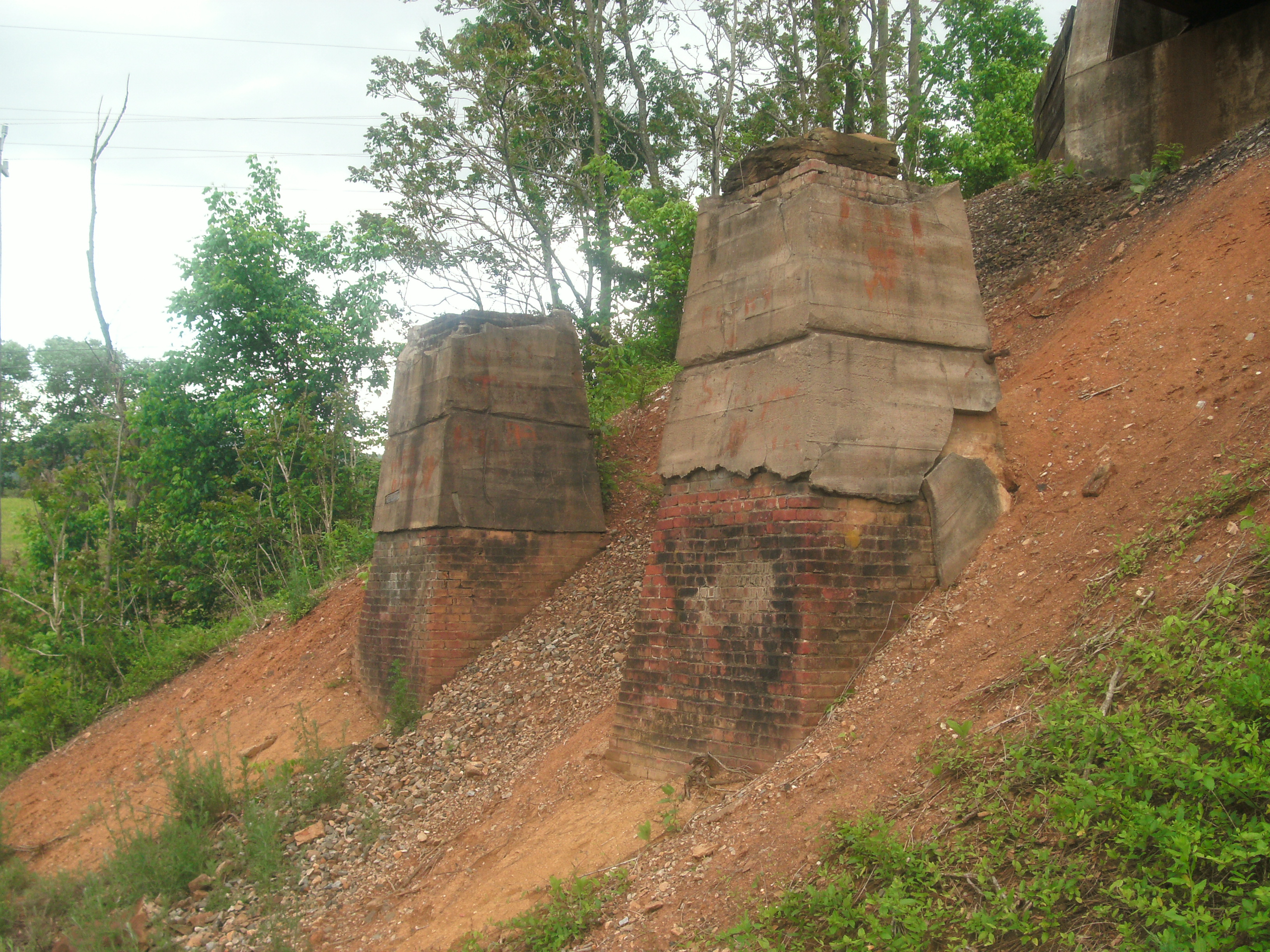
- Remains of the former bridge at the battle site, May 2016

- Location within Northern Virginia Location within Virginia Location within the United States
- Location: VA 340 and VA 665, Overall, Virginia
- Coordinates: 38°48′22″N 78°20′33″W
- Area: 700 acres (280 ha)
- Built: 1864
- Architectural style: Mid 19th Century Revival
- MPS: Civil War in Virginia MPS
- NRHP reference No.: 04000854
- VLR No.: 093-5023

Significant dates
- Added to NRHP: August 11, 2004
- Designated VLR: June 16, 2004

Milford Battlefield is situated in Overall, Virginia in Warren County and Page County, Virginia. It was the site of a battle on September 22–24 during the Valley campaigns of 1864 in the American Civil War. The site is located on property now privately owned.

== The battle ==
Of the several military engagements that took place at Milford (present-day Overall) during the War, the most significant occurred on September 22, 1864. This engagement is associated specifically with Union Maj. Gen. Philip Sheridan's victory over Confederate Maj. Gen. Jubal Early at Winchester on September 19, Early's retreat south up the Shenandoah Valley and Sheridan's pursuit, and Early's subsequent stand and defeat by Sheridan at Fisher's Hill on September 21.

Williams Carter Wickham first encountered Union cavalry of the 3d Division commanded by Brig. Gen. James H. Wilson (under Maj. Gen. Alfred T. A. Torbert) on September 20 near Front Royal. An engagement began near Crooked Run and the Front Royal Road that resulted in the Confederates being driven across the South Fork of the Shenandoah River. Wilson renewed his attacks on September 21, and part of his force succeeded in flanking the Confederates by crossing the river at Kendrick's and Richard's Fords. A running battle then ensued as the Confederates retreated up the valley (southward) toward Luray. They made two stands, and retreated from the first but held the second on the south bank of Gooney Run. An artillery duel then began that lasted well into the night. Later that evening, Wickham's troops withdrew and entrenched along the slopes immediately south of Milford, extending their lines from the river eastward to the steep slope in the vicinity of the present-day Shenandoah National Park boundary. The Southerners burned, or at least partially burned, the little bridge over Milford Run in their front Some accounts refer to the bridge as if it were present during the battle.

During the night, Brig. Gen. Wesley Merritt's cavalry reinforced Wilson, bringing total Union strength to two divisions, the First and Third, each composed of two brigades and supported by three to five batteries of artillery. Brig. Gen. George Armstrong Custer commanded the 1st Brigade consisting of one New York and four Michigan regiments of Merritt's 1st Division. After midnight, the Federals discovered Wickham's new position at Milford. The Union cavalry and horse artillery then moved southward and set up their guns (some of which were placed at the present-day location of Skymont).

Other actions occurred at or near Milford during the War. They included cavalry engagements on June 24, 1862, in early May 1864, and on October 25–26, 1864. In addition, Union and Confederate troops camped or bivouacked there at various times during the war.

== The site today ==
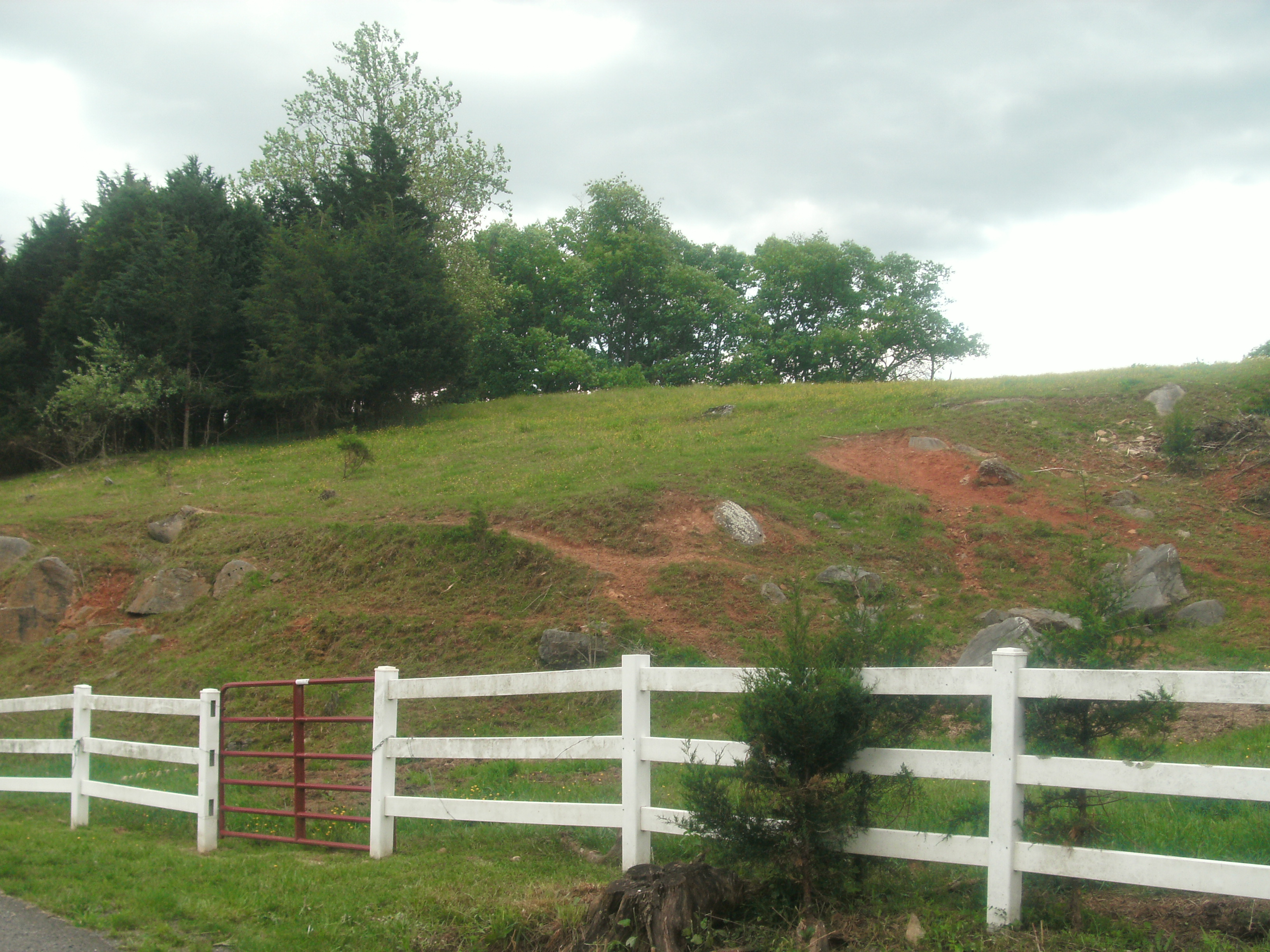
Landscape at the battle site, seen in May, 2016

Milford Battlefield contains about seven hundred acres of mostly hilly terrain between the South Fork of the Shenandoah River on the west and the Blue Ridge Mountains on the east. The site is privately owned.

At the time of the Civil War, the land was less wooded than at present, but apart from that the terrain is not much different. Recent signs of human activity on the landscape are mostly limited to a highway (U.S. Route 340), a railroad track, and some scattered dwellings and related structures that do not adversely affect the ability to understand the course of the engagements that occurred there during the war. The Page Valley narrows at Overall, which together with the turnpike made the site strategically important during the war. The site includes such battle-related contributing features as entrenchments and rifle pits. The battlefield district includes three contributing sites (the Overall House ruin, a historic cemetery, and a historic turnpike bridge abutment) and thirteen contributing structures (U.S. Route 340 which at the time was called the Luray and Front Royal Turnpike, one historic road trace, Overall House cistern, Overall House well, seven rifle pits, and two earthworks).

It was listed on the National Register of Historic Places in 2004.
