= Sylvester D. Rhodes =

American Civil War Medal of Honor recipient

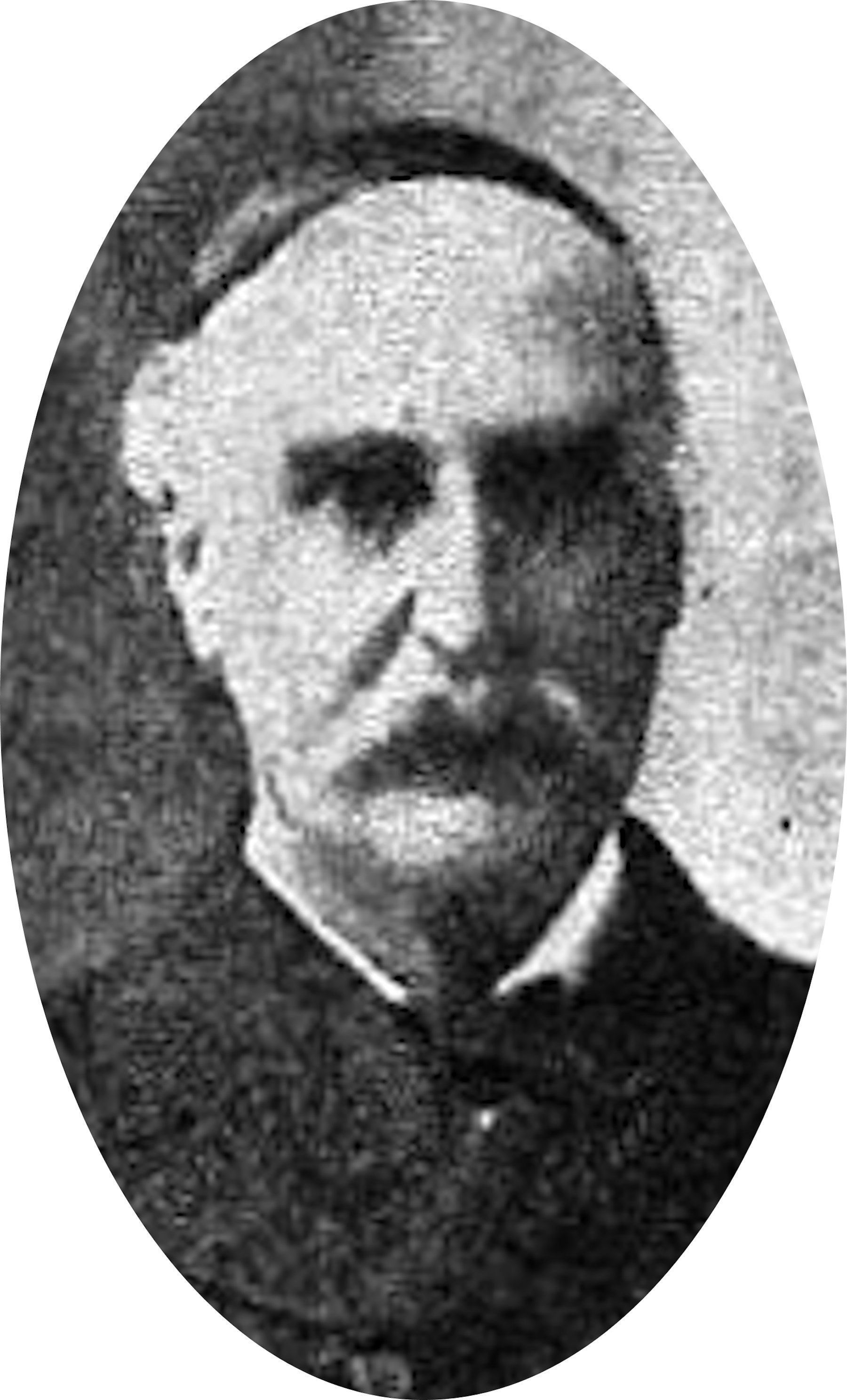
- Rhodes c. 1897
- Born: December 1, 1842; Plains, Pennsylvania
- Died: August 29, 1904 (aged 61); Pennsylvania
- Burial place: Hollenback Cemetery, Wilkes-Barre, Pennsylvania
- Military career
- Allegiance: United States
- Branch: United States Army; Union Army
- Service years: 1861 - 1865
- Rank: Captain
- Units: Company D, 61st Pennsylvania Infantry Regiment
- Conflicts: American Civil War • Battle of Fisher's Hill
- Awards: Medal of Honor

Sylvester D. Rhodes (December 1, 1842 – August 29, 1904) was a Union Army soldier during the American Civil War. He received the Medal of Honor for gallantry during the Battle of Fisher's Hill near Strasburg, Virginia fought September 21–22, 1864. The battle was one of the engagements of the Valley campaigns of 1864.

Rhodes joined the army from Wilkes-Barre, Pennsylvania in September 1861. He was commissioned as an officer in December 1864, and was mustered out in June 1865.

== Medal of Honor citation ==
"The President of the United States of America, in the name of Congress, takes pleasure in presenting the Medal of Honor to Sergeant Sylvester D. Rhodes, United States Army, for extraordinary heroism on 22 September 1864, while serving with Company D, 61st Pennsylvania Infantry, in action at Fisher's Hill, Virginia. Sergeant Rhodes was on the skirmish line which drove the enemy from the first entrenchment and was the first man to enter the breastworks, capturing one of the guns and turning it upon the enemy."

== See also ==
- List of American Civil War Medal of Honor recipients: Q-S
