= Mount Peace Cemetery =

Cemetery in Philadelphia, Pennsylvania

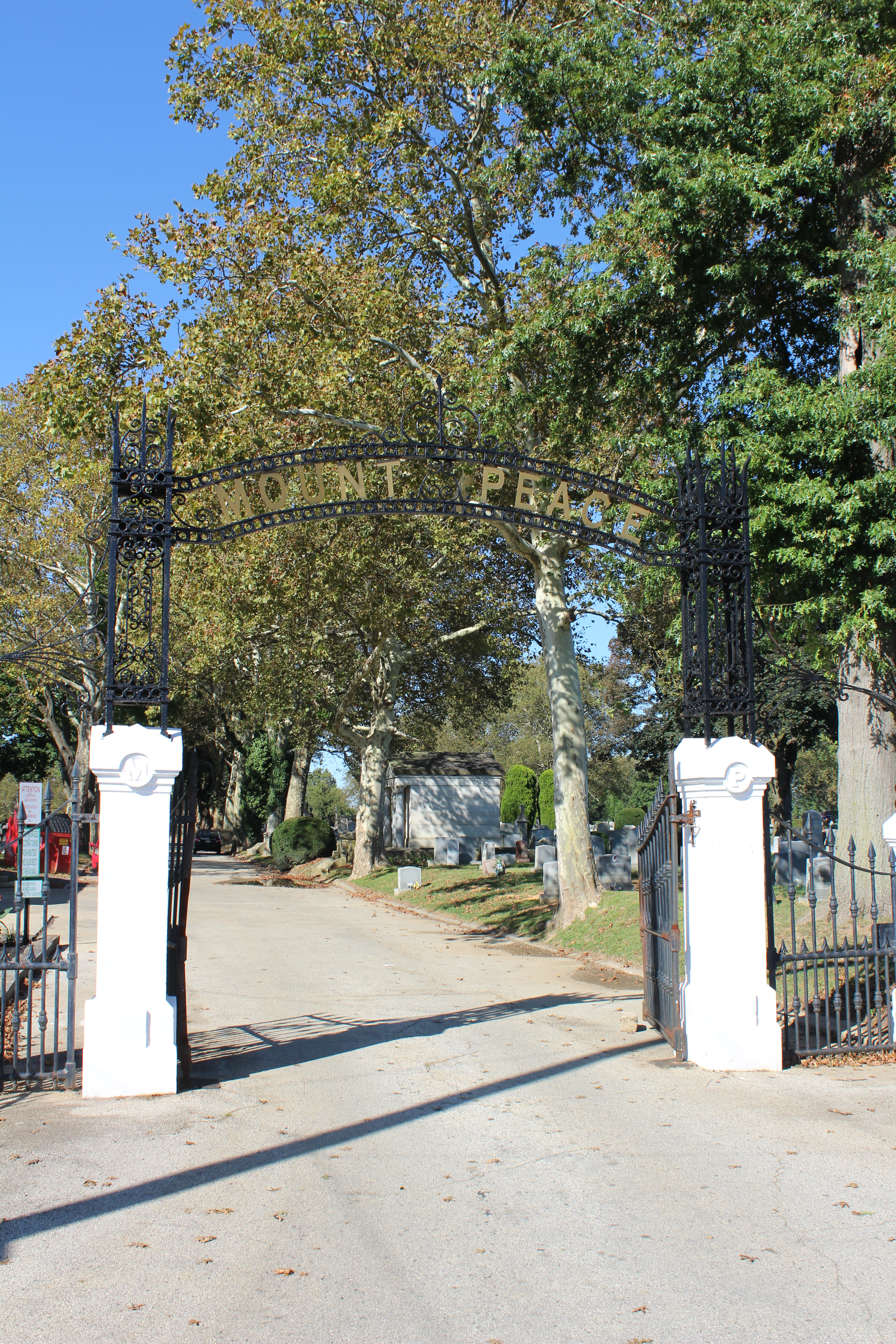
- Mount Peace Cemetery gates
- Interactive map of Mount Peace Cemetery

Details
- Established: 1865
- Location: 3111 West Lehigh Avenue, Philadelphia, Pennsylvania
- Country: United States
- Coordinates: 39.9980°N 75.1824°W
- Type: private
- Owned by: Odd Fellows
- Website: www.cemeteryco.com
- Find a Grave: Mount Peace Cemetery

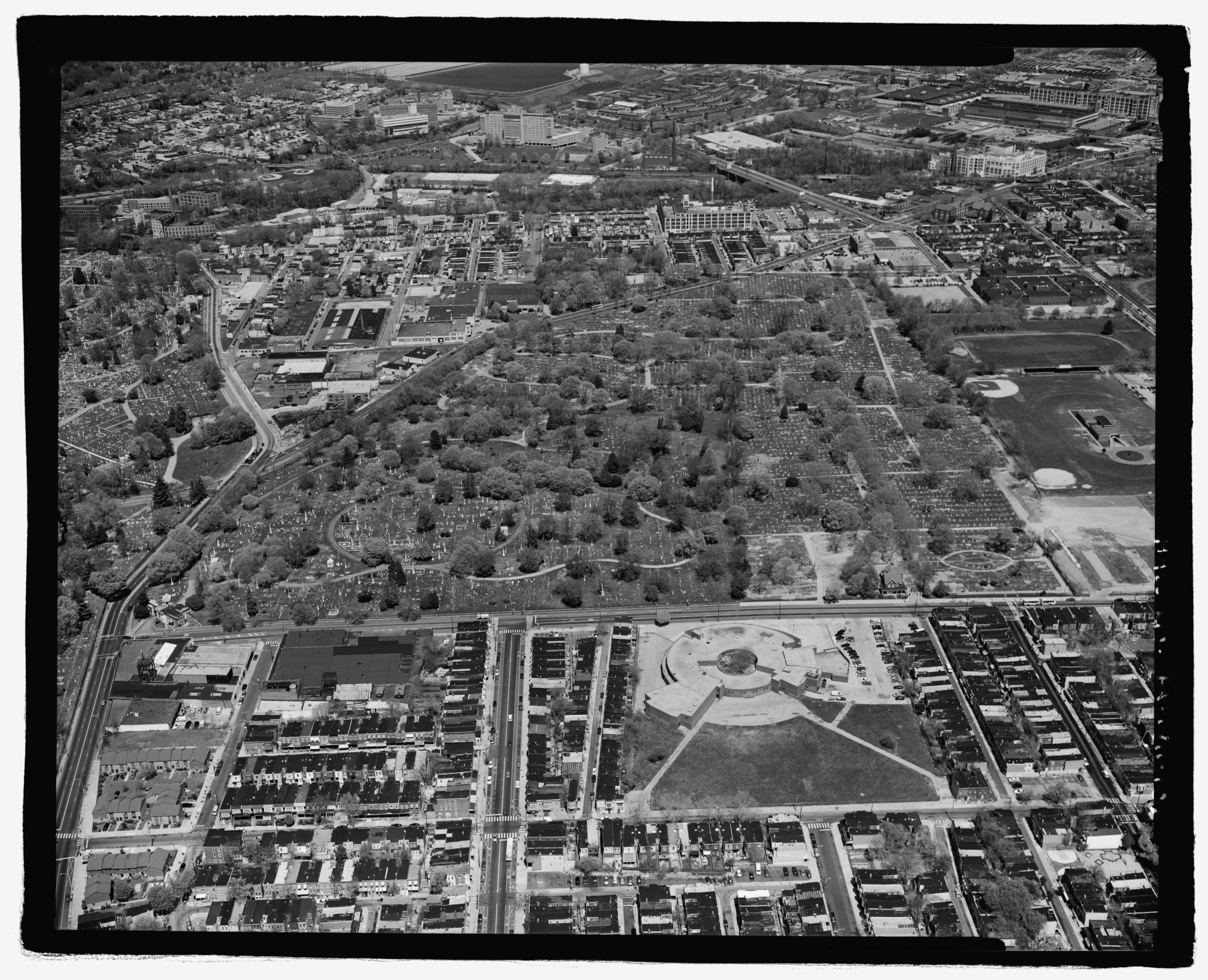
Aerial View of Mount Peace Cemetery

Mount Peace Cemetery is a cemetery in Philadelphia, Pennsylvania that is owned and operated by the Odd Fellows organization. It was established in 1865 and is located at 3111 West Lehigh Avenue, near the Laurel Hill Cemetery.

The cemetery property was originally part of the colonial estate of Robert Ralston and kept the estate name of Mount Peace. Another portion of the estate was used for the creation of Mount Vernon Cemetery.

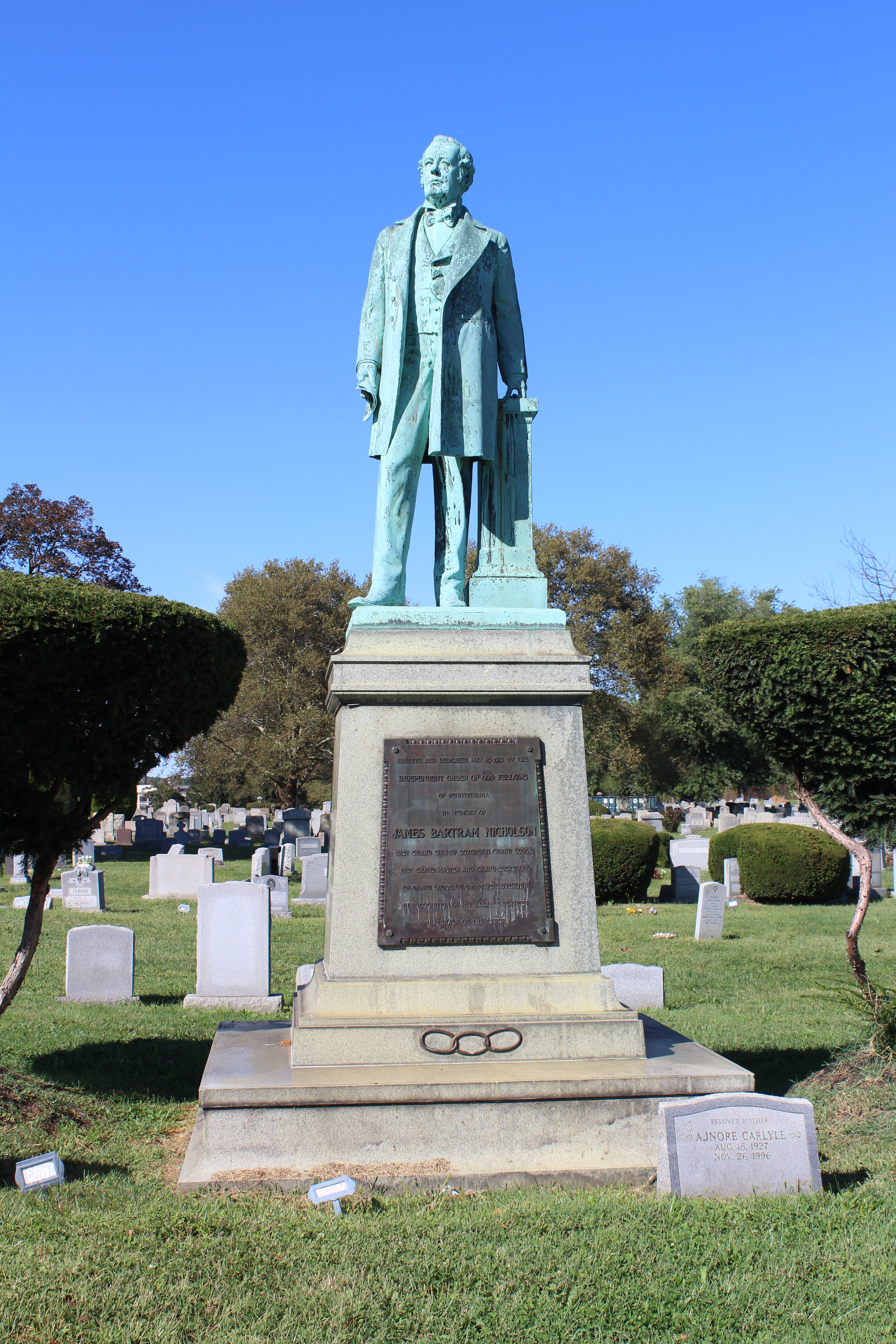
Statue of James Bartram Nicholson in Mount Peace Cemetery

In May 1913, a statue of James Bartram Nicholson was erected in Mount Peace Cemetery in dedication to his service as Grand Sire of Sovereign Grand Lodge and as Grand Master and Grand Secretary of Grand Lodge of 1.O.O.F. of Pennsylvania.

In 1951, the Oddfellows Cemetery on 22nd street in Philadelphia was closed and the bodies reinterred to other cemeteries operated by the Oddfellows including Lawnview Memorial Park and Mount Peace Cemetery.

The burial records for Mount Peace Cemetery are kept at Lawnview Memorial Park in Rockledge, Pennsylvania.

== Notable burials ==
- Joseph A. Bailly (1825–1883), sculptor
- Charles E. Barber (1840–1917), Sixth Chief Engraver of the U.S. Mint
- Thomas Brigham Bishop (1835–1905), composer of popular music
- Daniel G. Caldwell (1842–1917), U.S. Civil War Medal of Honor recipient
- Charles H. Clausen (1842–1922), U.S. Civil War Medal of Honor recipient
- John W. Comfort (1844–1893), Texas-Indian Wars Medal of Honor recipient
- Horace Fogel (1861–1928), Major League Baseball manager
- Bill Haeffner (1894–1982), professional baseball player
- Bill Hallman (1876–1950), professional baseball player
- Jack Lapp (1884–1920), professional baseball player
- Francis Mahler (1826–1863), Union Army officer in the U.S. Civil War
- Turner Gustavus Morehead (1814–1892), Brevet Brigadier General in the Union Army
- Uriah Smith Stephens (1821–1882), labor leader
- John Weaver (1861–1928), mayor of Philadelphia from 1903 to 1907
- Jimmy Young (1948–2005), professional boxer
