= Otaki, California =

Former Native American settlement

Otaki (also, Otakey, O-ta-ki and O-ta-kum-ni) is a former Native American settlement of the Maidu people in Butte County, California, United States. It was located on the Big Chico Creek, roughly two miles north of its confluence with the Sacramento River. Its name comes from the Maidu name for the Big Chico Creek, Ótakim shéwi.

== See also ==
- Native American history of California
