= Bill Hallman (outfielder) =

American baseball player (1876–1950)

- Outfielder
- Born: March 15, 1876; Philadelphia, Pennsylvania, U.S.
- Died: April 23, 1950 (aged 74); Philadelphia, Pennsylvania, U.S.
- Batted: Left Threw: Left

MLB debut
- April 25, 1901, for the Milwaukee Brewers

Last MLB appearance
- September 27, 1907, for the Pittsburgh Pirates

MLB statistics
- Batting average: .235
- Home runs: 3
- Runs batted in: 86
- Stats at Baseball Reference

Teams
- Milwaukee Brewers (1901); Chicago White Sox (1903); Pittsburgh Pirates (1906–1907)

William Harry Hallman (March 15, 1876 – April 23, 1950) was an American professional baseball player. He won the American Association batting championship in 1906.

== Career ==
As an outfielder, he played for three different teams in Major League Baseball; the Milwaukee Brewers in 1901, the Chicago White Sox in 1903, and the Pittsburgh Pirates in 1906 and 1907. Additionally, he had a long minor league baseball career, beginning in 1894 and ending in 1914.

== Death ==
Hallman died at the age of 74 in his hometown of Philadelphia, Pennsylvania, on April 23, 1950, and was interred at Mount Peace Cemetery.

== Personal life ==
He was the nephew of Bill Hallman, who also played baseball at the Major League level.
