= Overall, Virginia =

Overall
- Unincorporated community
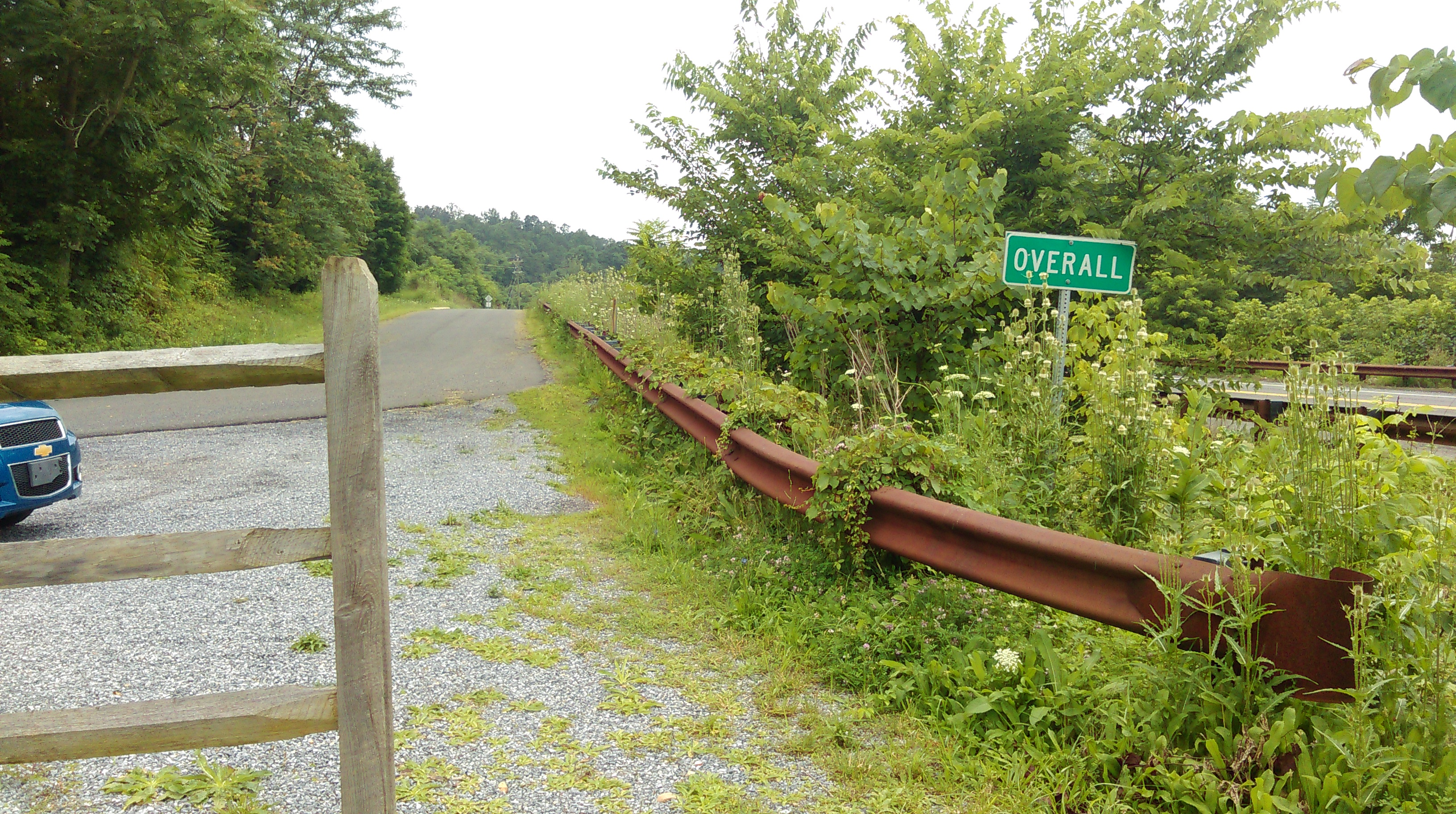
- Sign denoting Overall, Virginia, at the end of the demolished bridge (Page County Bridge No. 1004) over Jeremiah's Run.

- Location within the Commonwealth of Virginia Overall (Virginia) Overall (the United States)
- Coordinates: 38.804°N 78.348°W
- Country: United States
- State: Virginia
- County: Page and Warren
- Time zone: UTC−5 (Eastern (EST))
  - Summer (DST): UTC−4 (EDT)
- ZIP codes: 22650
- Area code: 540

Overall is an unincorporated community in Warren County, Virginia, United States. It is considered to be a part of the Washington-Arlington metro area. The latitude of Overall is 38.806N and the longitude is -78.347W. It sits at an elevation of 630 feet (190 m) just at the Stonewall Jackson Highway (U.S. Route 340). ZIP code is 22650.

== History ==
Overall was first called Centre Mills, later Milford, before the present name was adopted. John Froman Overall (1756-1819) is buried in the Overall cemetery. The Overall House is now a ruin of a limestone foundation, all that remains of the early 1800 plastered log home built by his son Isaac Overall (1776-c 1843). The Milford Battlefield of 1864 is situated in Overall.

The Milford Battlefield and Page County Bridge No. 1990 are listed on the National Register of Historic Places.

== Nature ==
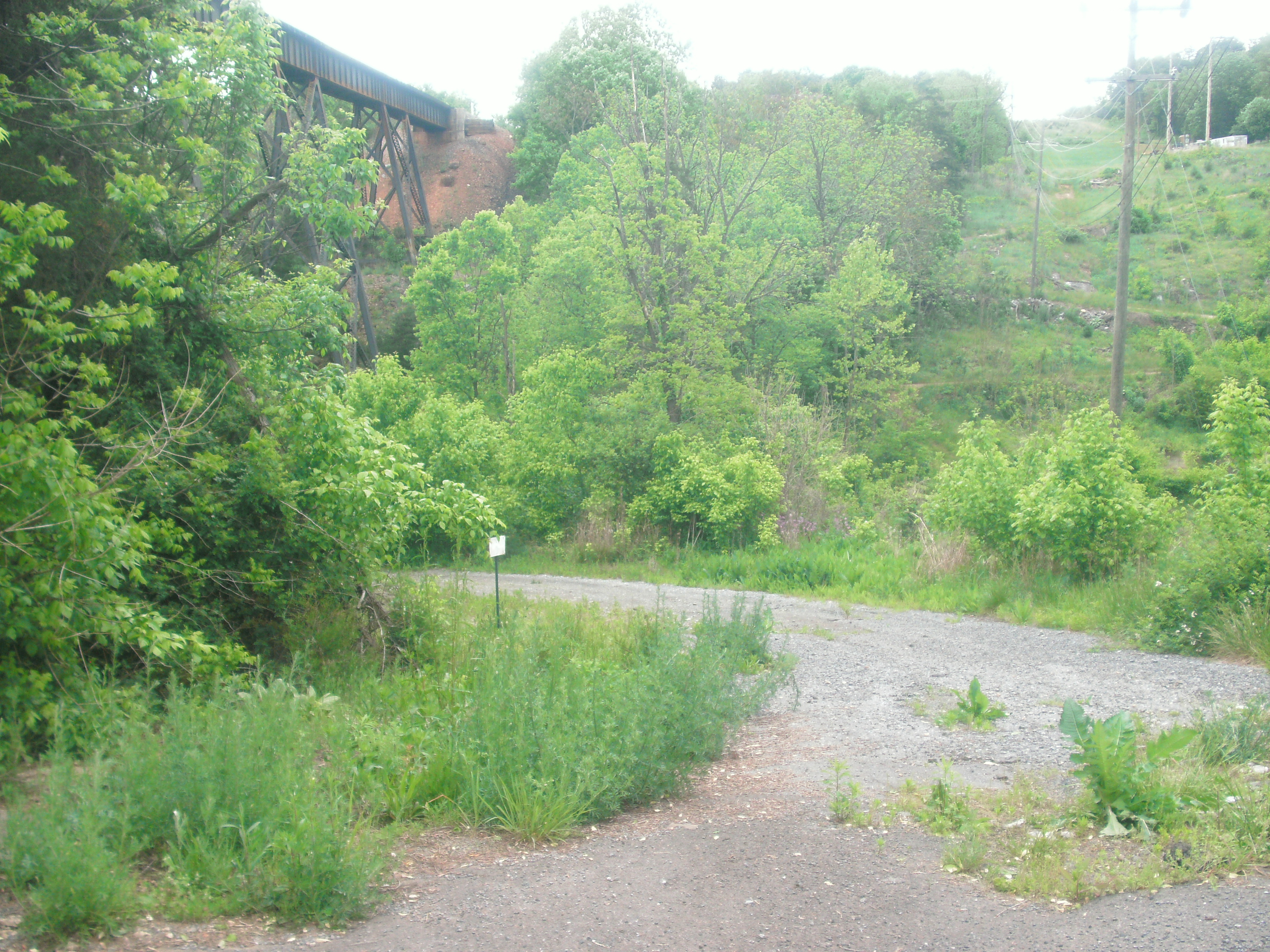
Overall Run in May, 2016

Overall Run, a tributary of the South Fork of the Shenandoah River, flows west to the river from Brush Mountain, a part of the Blue Ridge Mountains, and an unnamed intermittent stream flows down Sandbank Hollow to join Overall Run a few hundred yards east of its mouth. Overall Creek is situated here. Just east of Overall is Shenandoah National Park with the Overall Falls, which is the highest waterfall in Virginia.
