= The American Antiquarian and Oriental Journal =

History research publication

The American Antiquarian and Oriental Journal was an historical journal that published monographs on archeology, ethnology, and on the history and culture of the Indigenous people of North America.

First published in 1878, the title was originally American Antiquarian but it was changed to the longer name by volume two, issue two. It was published around the turn of the 20th century in Good Hope, Illinois, and later Chicago, United States, moving to Salem, Massachusetts in 1908. One of the main editors for most of its history was Rev. Stephen D. Peet, Ph.D., he was succeeded in 1911 by J. O. Kinnaman of Benton Harbor, Michigan. The American Antiqarian and Oriental Journal ceased publication in 1914. It has been assigned the ISSN 1068–3321.
