= Honeyville, Virginia =

Unincorporated community in Virginia, US

Coordinates: 38.57873°N 78.56223°W

Honeyville is an unincorporated community in Page County, in the U.S. state of Virginia. It is located in between Alma and Stanley.
