= Page County High School =

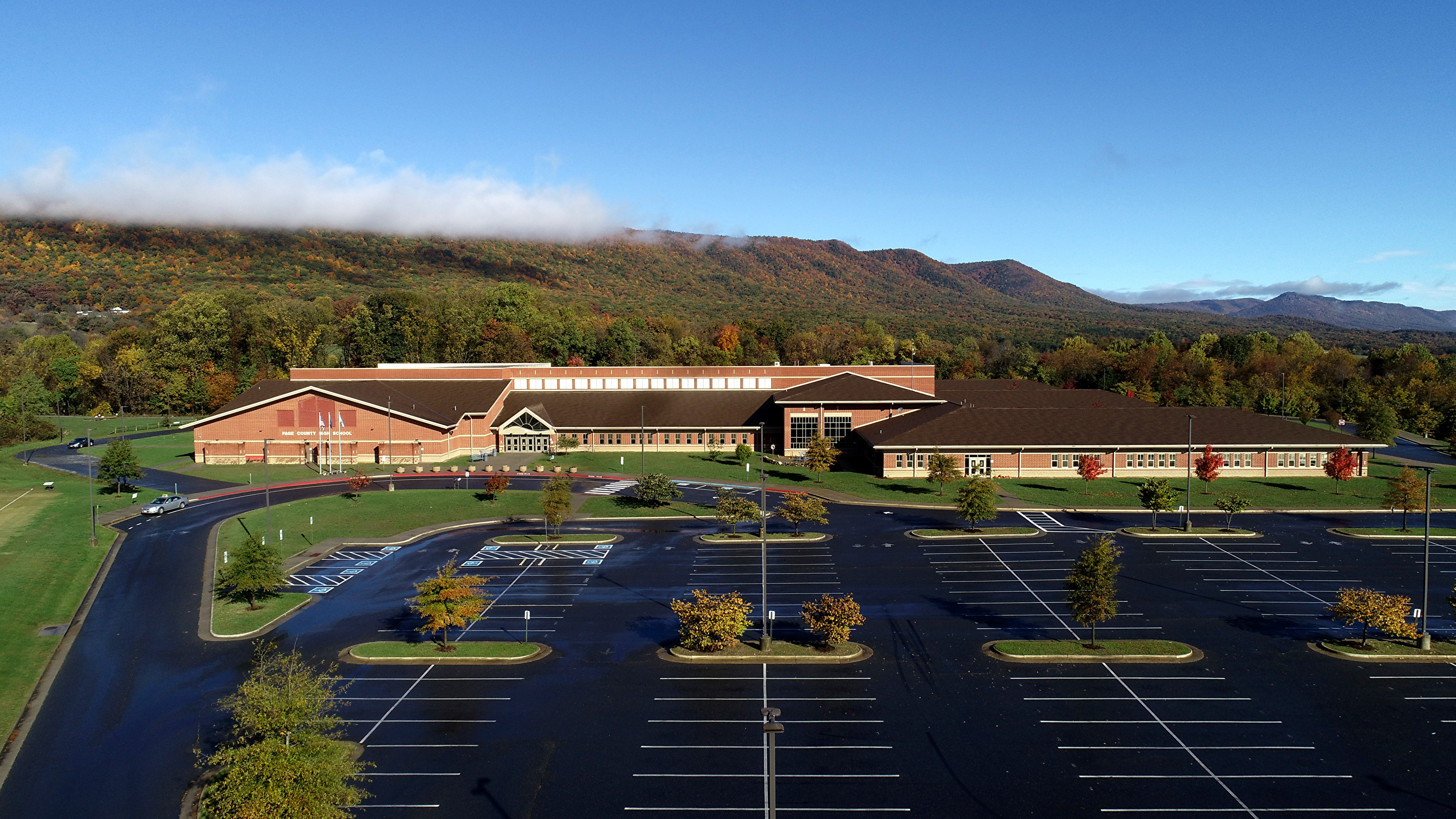

Location
- 184 Panther Drive; Shenandoah, Virginia 22849; United States; 38°33′49.9″N 78°36′35.7″W

Information
- Type: Public secondary
- Established: 1961
- Locale: Rural, Distant
- School district: Page County Public Schools
- NCES District ID: 5102850
- Superintendent: Bryan Huber
- NCES School ID: 510285001181
- Principal: David Cale
- Teaching staff: 35.25 (on an FTE basis)
- Grades: 9–12
- Enrollment: 473 (2024–25)
  - Male: 247
  - Female: 226
- Student to teacher ratio: 13.42
- Colors: Baby Blue and Navy Blue
- Mascot: Panther
- Communities served: Shenandoah, Stanley
- Feeder schools: Shenandoah Elementary, Stanley Elementary, Page County Middle
- Athletic Conference: A Bull Run District; Region B
- Website: Official Website

Page County High School is a public secondary school located in Shenandoah, Virginia. The dedication of the original building in 1961 brought together students from the former Shenandoah and Stanley high schools. It holds grade levels 9–12 (freshmen through seniors) and has an enrollment of approximately 473 students. The feeder school is Page County Middle School, which is in turn fed by Shenandoah Elementary and Stanley Elementary schools, and formerly Grove Hill Elementary School. Page County High School has an auditorium with a capacity of approximately 700 people, a gym with retractable bleachers on two sides, a full library, a cafeteria that feeds students in two 25 minute blocks each day, and three computer labs. The school's mascot is the panther.

== Major Renovations ==
Major renovations of Page County High School took place during the summer of 2002. The front facade, doors, and windows were replaced, and many interior changes were made. There were permanent annexes erected behind the school that housed math and foreign language classes.

In 2005, a distance learning lab was instituted, allowing students and teachers to communicate with Page County's second high school, Luray High School, in real time.

In 2006, ground was broken on a new building that would come to house Page County High School. Completed in 2009, the new building is located directly behind the former high school, now Page County Middle School.

A new rubber track was added in the summer of 2015.

== Athletic Complex ==
Page County High School houses an exquisite athletic complex, which hosts many of the school's sports. To the left of the school are the practice soccer and practice football fields. Before Page County Middle School stands the track and the football/soccer field. Unlike many tracks, Page County's track is not regulation length, therefore all running events start and end differently. The school's softball field is on a hill behind the middle school. The baseball field stands to the left of the track and football field. The cross country course begins and ends on the football field, but runs through nearby woods and around two large fields, one behind the school and one adjacent to the baseball field. Basketball and volleyball are both played inside the school's gym.

== New Building ==
In August 2006, the Page County Board of Supervisors approved construction of two new high schools in the county. These plans would turn the current Page County High School building into a middle school. The groundbreaking was in November 2006, and the school was scheduled to be completed for the opening of the 2009–2010 school year.

The new Page County High School building is located directly above the old high school, which now houses Page County Middle School.

In September 2009, the new Page County High School opened its doors. In June 2010, the school saw its first senior class, the Class of 2010, graduate in an indoor ceremony.

== Notable alumni ==
- Wayne Comer (1962), former Major League Baseball player
