= Charles D. Price =

American politician (died 1974)

Member of the Virginia House of Delegates from the Page and Warren counties district
- In office 1949–1965

Personal details
- Born: Charles Daniel Price
- Died: April 22, 1974 Charlottesville, Virginia, U.S.
- Resting place: Alma Lutheran Church Cemetery
- Party: Democratic
- Spouse(s): Mary Evelyn Grove (died 1959) Lennis Shoemaker Thrower (m. 1965; died 1965)
- Education: University of Virginia
- Occupation: Politician; farmer; bank president

Charles Daniel Price (died April 22, 1974) was an American politician from Virginia. He served as a member of the Virginia House of Delegates from 1949 to 1965.

== Early life ==
Charles Daniel Price graduated from the University of Virginia. His brother was Roanoke commonwealth's attorney Samuel R. Price.

== Career ==
Price was a member of the Page County School Board for 16 years. He was a livestock farmer in Page County, Virginia. He was president of the Virginia State Canners Association. He owned the Alma Cannery and was known for growing tomatoes in Page County.

Price was a Democrat. He served in the Virginia House of Delegates, representing Page and Warren counties, from 1949 to 1965. In 1965, he did not seek re-election. He served on the Page County Democratic committee. He was elected as a delegate to the 7th district convention.

Price was president of Farmers and Merchants National Bank in Stanley and the Shen Valley Meat Packers Cooperative in Timberville. He was Page County's representative in the State Board of Community Colleges original steering committee. From 1954 to 1966, he was a member of the board of visitors of the Virginia School for the Deaf and the Blind.

== Personal life ==
Price married Mary Evelyn Grove. His stepdaughter was Doris Elaine. His wife died in 1959. He married Lennis (née Shoemaker) Thrower, daughter of Simeon Shoemaker, on April 30, 1965. She died in August 1965. He lived in Alma.

Price had a heart attack and died the following day, April 22, 1974, aged 78 or 79, at University of Virginia Hospital in Charlottesville. He was buried in Alma Lutheran Church Cemetery.

== Legacy ==
In 1969, the Virginia School for the Blind and Deaf named a boys' dormitory in his honor.
