= Shenandoah Land and Improvement Company Office =

Historic commercial building in Virginia, United States

- U.S. National Register of Historic Places
- U.S. Historic district – Contributing property
- Virginia Landmarks Register
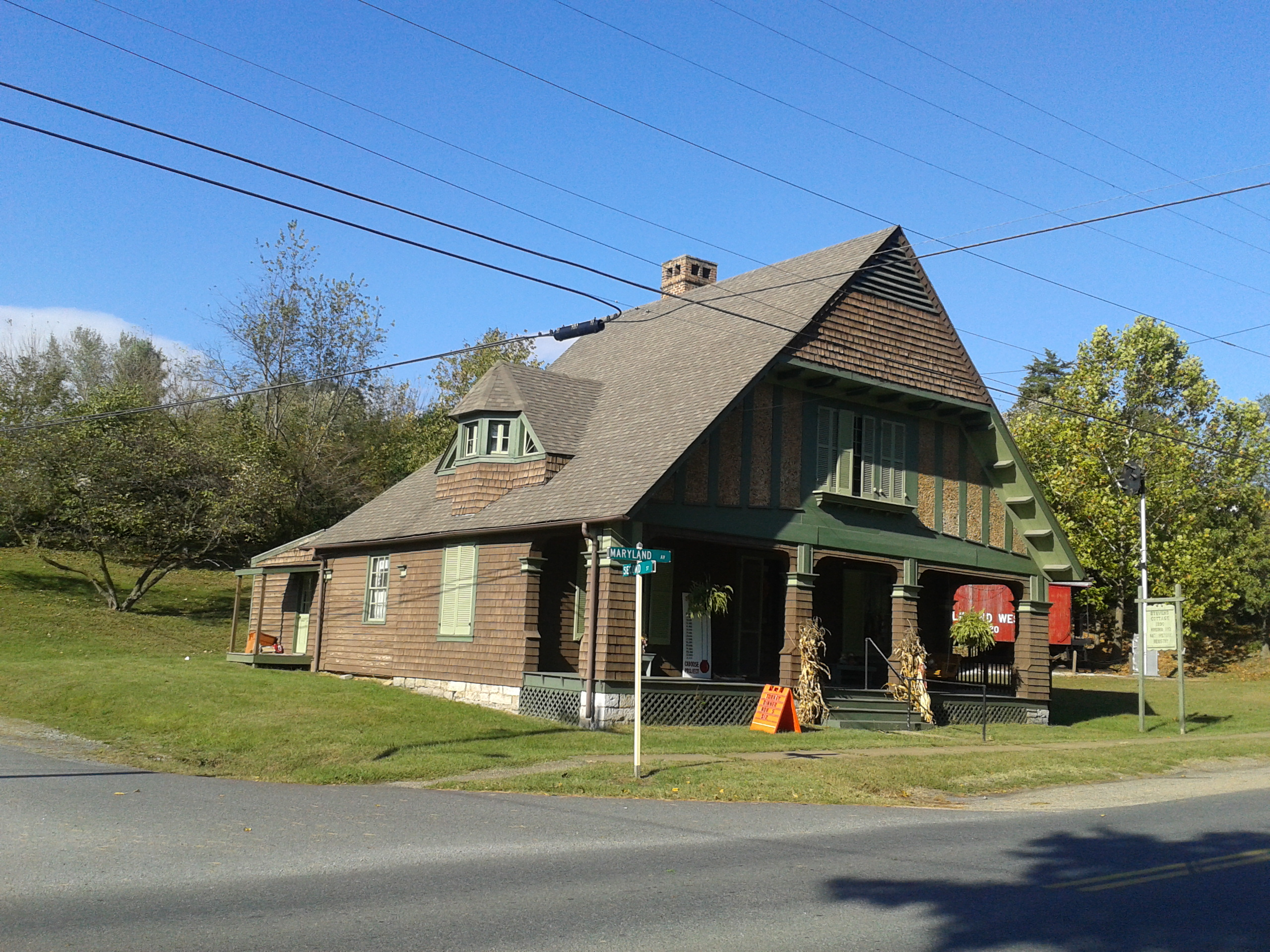
- The Shenandoah Land and Improvement Company Office in October, 2017

- Location within Virginia Location within the United States
- Location: 201 Maryland Ave., Shenandoah, Virginia
- Coordinates: 38°29′2″N 78°37′23″W
- Area: less than one acre
- Built: 1891
- Architect: Poindexter, William M.
- Architectural style: Shingle Style, Edwardian
- NRHP reference No.: 78003038
- VLR No.: 299-0002

Significant dates
- Added to NRHP: July 14, 1978
- Designated VLR: December 16, 1975

Shenandoah Land and Improvement Company Office, also known as Stevens Cottage, is a historic office building located at Shenandoah, Page County, Virginia. It was built in 1891, as an office for the Shenandoah Land and Improvement Company. It is a 1 1/2-story, Shingle Style cottage with a projecting front gable, a deeply recessed porch, and inset rectangular stucco panels resembling half-timbering.

It was listed on the National Register of Historic Places in 1976. It is included as a contributing property in the Shenandoah Historic District.
