= Welfley–Shuler House =

Historic house in Virginia, United States

- U.S. National Register of Historic Places
- Virginia Landmarks Register
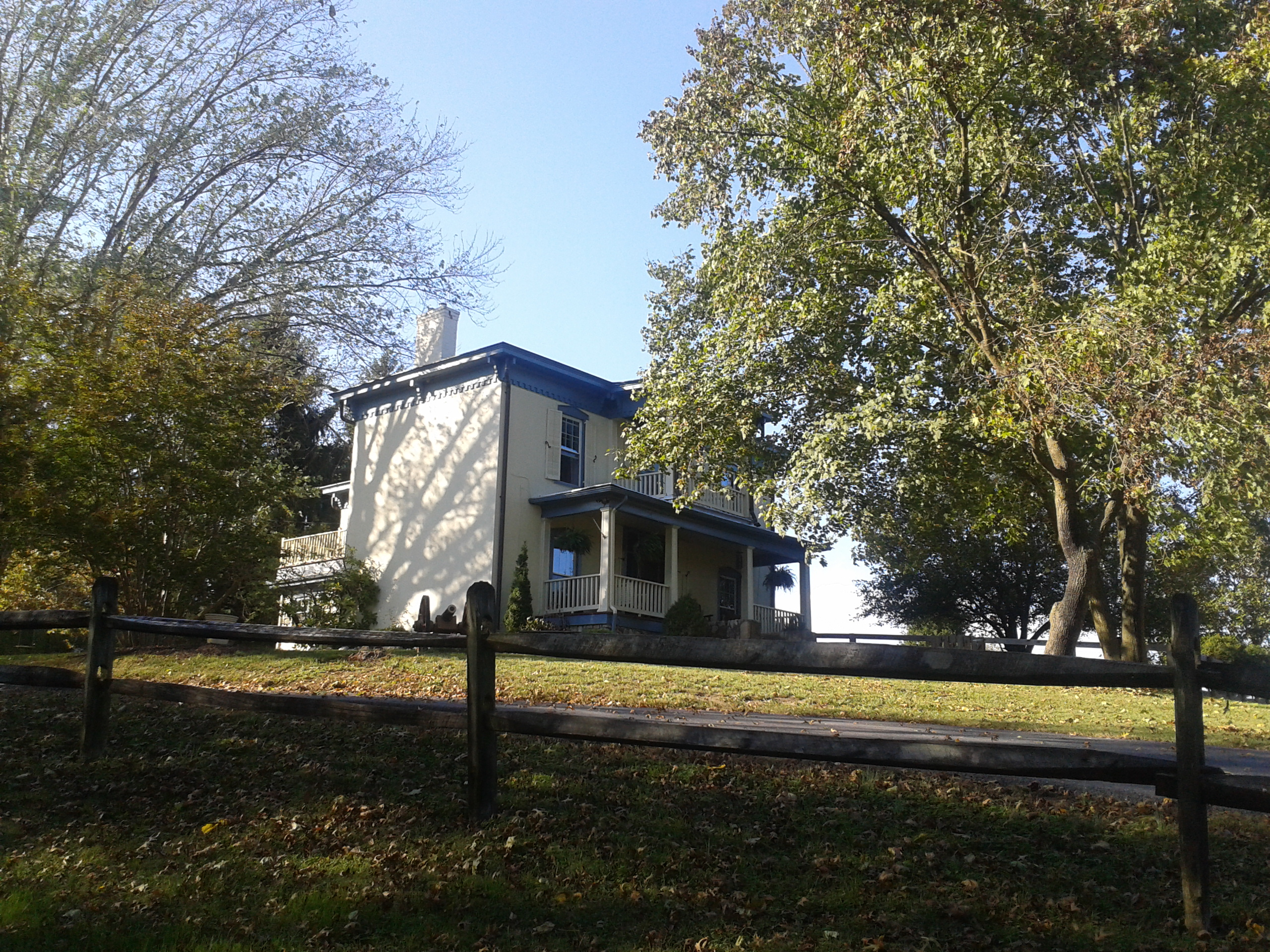
- The Welfley–Shuler House in October, 2017

- Location within Virginia Location within the United States
- Location: 449 Shipyard Rd., near Shenandoah, Virginia
- Coordinates: 38°30′3″N 78°38′3″W
- Area: 9.8 acres (4.0 ha)
- Built: c. 1876
- Architectural style: Greek Revival, Italianate
- NRHP reference No.: 99001604
- VLR No.: 069-5075

Significant dates
- Added to NRHP: December 22, 1999
- Designated VLR: September 15, 1999

Welfley–Shuler House is a historic home located near Shenandoah, Page County, Virginia.

== Construction ==
It was built about 1876, and is a two-story, stuccoed stone dwelling with hipped roof and a two-story rear ell. It has a one-story side wing, a two-story front porch, and an enclosed one-story porch on the south side of the ell. It features vernacular Greek Revival and Italianate style exterior decorative details. It was renovated in 1989–1993. Also on the property are the contributing stone milkhouse (c. 1876), the foundations of a bank barn and watering trough (c. 1930).

== Registry ==
It was listed on the National Register of Historic Places in 1999.
