= Nakedtop =

Mountain in Virginia, United States

Coordinates: 38.5578934°N 78.4069478°W

Nakedtop is a summit in Page County, Virginia, in the United States. With an elevation of 3,734 feet (1,138 m), Nakedtop is the 157th highest mountain in Virginia.

Nakedtop was so called because its peak has no trees.

Nakedtop is visible from the Appalachian Trail.
