= Blainville =

Blainville may refer to:

Places:

- Blainville-Crevon in the Seine-Maritime département, Haute-Normandie, France
- Blainville-sur-Mer in the Manche département, Basse-Normandie, France
- Blainville-sur-Orne in the Calvados département, Basse-Normandie
- Blainville, Quebec, a suburb of Montreal, Quebec
- Blainville (provincial electoral district), a provincial electoral district in Quebec, Canada
- Blainville station, a railway station in Blainville, Quebec

People:

- Henri Marie Ducrotay de Blainville (1777–1850), French zoologist

Sports:

- A.S. Blainville, a semi-professional soccer club in Quebec, Canada

== See also ==
- Blaineville, Virginia, an unincorporated community in the United States
