= Fort Philip Long =

- U.S. National Register of Historic Places
- Virginia Landmarks Register
- Location within Virginia Location within the United States
- Location: Off VA 616 on Shenandoah River, near Stanley, Virginia
- Coordinates: 38°36′20″N 78°33′44″W
- Area: 900 acres (360 ha)
- NRHP reference No.: 73002048
- VLR No.: 069-0002

Significant dates
- Added to NRHP: April 11, 1973
- Designated VLR: November 21, 1972

Fort Philip Long is a historic fort complex located on the Shenandoah River near Stanley, Page County, Virginia. It is a significant example of the fortifications undertaken by the families in the Massanutten country of Page County in the later half of the 18th century. It includes an 18th-century, 1 1/2-story, rubble limestone structure with a gable roof. It sits on a basement and features a massive exterior asymmetrical stone chimney. The fort is situated about 100 yards from the stone dwelling. It consists of random rubble limestone walls that form a tall barrel vault pierced by loopholes. The fort may also be entered by means of a tunnel, sunk into the limestone, running from the basement of the stone house. Also on the property is a large brick three-bay square house built in 1856 and a stone slave quarter.

It was listed on the National Register of Historic Places in 1973.

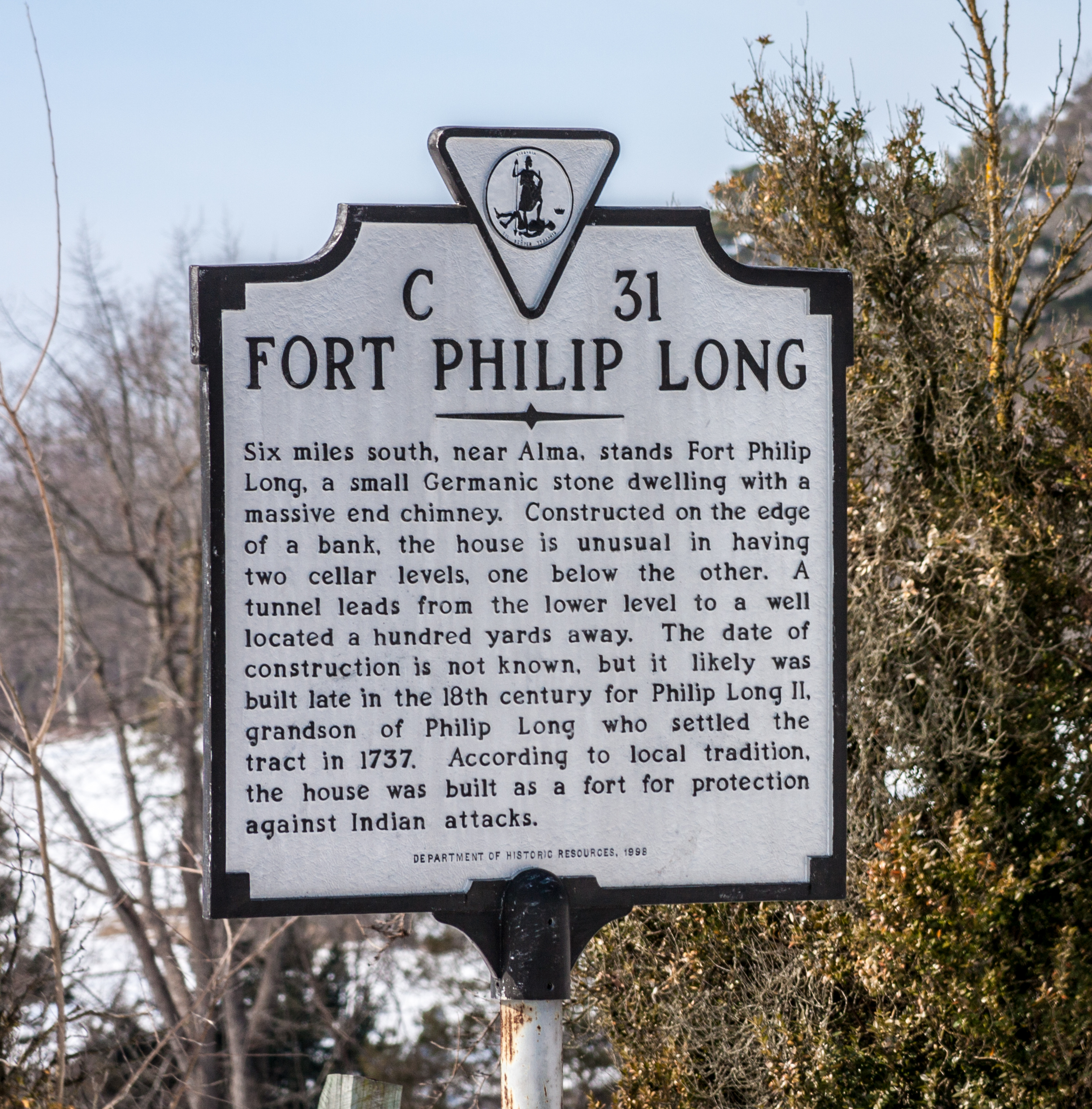
Fort Philip Long historical marker
