= Cavetown (disambiguation) =

Cavetown is an English singer-songwriter. The title may also refer to:

- Cavetown Lough, a lake in Ireland
- Cavetown, Maryland, a census-designated place in Maryland, United States
- Cavetown, Virginia, an unincorporated community in Virginia, United States
