= Brookside, Virginia =

Unincorporated community in Virginia

Coordinates: 38°40′17″N 78°26′09″W

Brookside is an unincorporated community in Page County, in the U.S. state of Virginia.
