= Shenandoah Forest, Virginia =

Unincorporated community in Virginia, US

Coordinates: 38°39′40″N 78°32′59″W

Shenandoah Forest is an unincorporated community in Page County, in the U.S. state of Virginia.
