= Jollett, Virginia =

Unincorporated community in Virginia, US

Coordinates: 38°27′50″N 78°31′26″W

Jollett is an unincorporated community in Page County, in the U.S. state of Virginia.
