= Marksville =

Marksville may refer to:

- Marksville, Louisiana, a city in the United States
- Marksville, Virginia
- Marksville culture, an archaeological culture in the United States
