= Valleyburgh, Virginia =

Unincorporated community in Virginia, US

Coordinates: 38°36′59″N 78°24′32″W

Valleyburgh is an unincorporated community in Page County, in the U.S. state of Virginia.
