= Luray High School =

Location
- 243 Bulldog Drive; Luray, Virginia 22835; United States; 38°39′17.8″N 78°29′08.1″W

Information
- Type: Public secondary
- Established: 1903
- Locale: Rural, Fringe
- School district: Page County Public Schools
- Superintendent: Antonia Fox
- Principal: Tata Meadows
- Teaching staff: 36.00 (on an FTE basis)
- Grades: 9–12
- Enrollment: 452 (2024–25)
- Student to teacher ratio: 12.56
- Colors: Maroon, Black, and White
- Fight song: Maroon and White
- Athletics conference: Virginia High School League; A Region B A Bull Run District
- Mascot: Bulldog
- Yearbook: Luray High School Highland
- Communities served: Luray, Rileyville
- Feeder schools: Luray Elementary, Springfield Elementary, Luray Middle
- Website: Official Website

Luray High School is a public secondary school located in Luray, Virginia, United States. Luray High School is home to approximately 500 students, ranging from grades 9–12. Before construction of the new Luray High School building, it was one of the few 5-year high schools in the nation. The school is part of the Page County Public School System.

The school's colors are maroon, black, and white, and the mascot is the bulldog. The fight song is Maroon and White.

== History ==
Luray High School began operations in 1903, led by principal Mr. Thomas G. Hamilton. At this time, the school was located on Court Street. In 1930, a new school building was constructed on Luray Avenue, leaving the old facility to be used by the local government until its demolition in 2014. The school housed eleven grades until the addition of grade 12 in 1950.

Until construction of a new elementary school in 1961, the Luray High School facility housed all school grades. After the construction of Luray Elementary School, the high school facility housed grades 8-12. This, along with the 1961 addition of the gym and vocational complexes, allowed for a significant expansion of the curriculum.

Extensive renovations took place between 1981-82. An improved heating and ventilation system was installed, and a new office complex, library, cafeteria, and music department were created to alleviate space needs. Additional space for instruction was also created by the conversion of the Bradley House to the art department and the addition of two mobile units as two new classrooms. A new art building was created in 2001-02 when the previous building, the former Bradley House, caught on fire and was deemed unusable.

In 2003, Luray High School celebrated its 100th anniversary.

In August 2006, the Page County Board of Supervisors approved construction of two new high schools in the county, and ground was broken in November 2006. The new building was constructed on the outskirts of Luray, in the unincorporated town of Leaksville. The building was dedicated on August 29, 2009, and the first day of school was September 8.

Luray High School houses grades 9-12 and has adopted block scheduling. During the summer of 2009, the former high school on Luray Avenue was transformed into Luray Middle School, which now houses grades 6-8.

Despite the relocation of the school, Luray High School still uses Bulldog Field for its baseball and football games. The complex also has a track. However, for home cross country practices and meets, the team uses the new course at the new high school.

== Notable alumni ==
- Floyd Baker (1935), former Major League Baseball player
