= Shenandoah High School =

Shenandoah High School may refer to:

- Shenandoah High School (Indiana), near Middletown, Indiana, United States
- Shenandoah High School (Iowa), in Shenandoah, Iowa, United States
- Shenandoah High School (Ohio), near Sarahsville, Ohio, United States
- Shenandoah High School in Shenandoah Historic District, Shenandoah, Page County, Virginia, United States
