= Strickler–Louderback House =

Historic house in Virginia, United States

- U.S. National Register of Historic Places
- Virginia Landmarks Register
- Location within Virginia Location within the United States
- Location: 1001 Old Farm Rd., near Shenandoah, Virginia
- Coordinates: 38°32′4″N 78°34′51″W
- Area: 2.5 acres (1.0 ha)
- Built: 1852
- Architectural style: Federal, Greek Revival, et al.
- NRHP reference No.: 00001441
- VLR No.: 069-0105

Significant dates
- Added to NRHP: November 22, 2000
- Designated VLR: September 13, 2000

Strickler–Louderback House is a historic home located near Shenandoah, Page County, Virginia. It was built in 1852, and is a two-story, five-bay, brick dwelling with a two-story rear ell. It has a metal-sheathed gable roof, gable-end chimneys, and a one-story Greek Revival-style front porch. The interior features Federal- and Greek Revival-style decorative detailing. It was renovated in 1989–1993. Also on the property are the contributing L-shaped outbuilding, grape arbor, chicken house, and family cemetery.

It was listed on the National Register of Historic Places in 2000.
