= Graves Chapel and Cemetery =

Historic site in Page County, Virginia, US

- U.S. National Register of Historic Places
- Virginia Landmarks Register
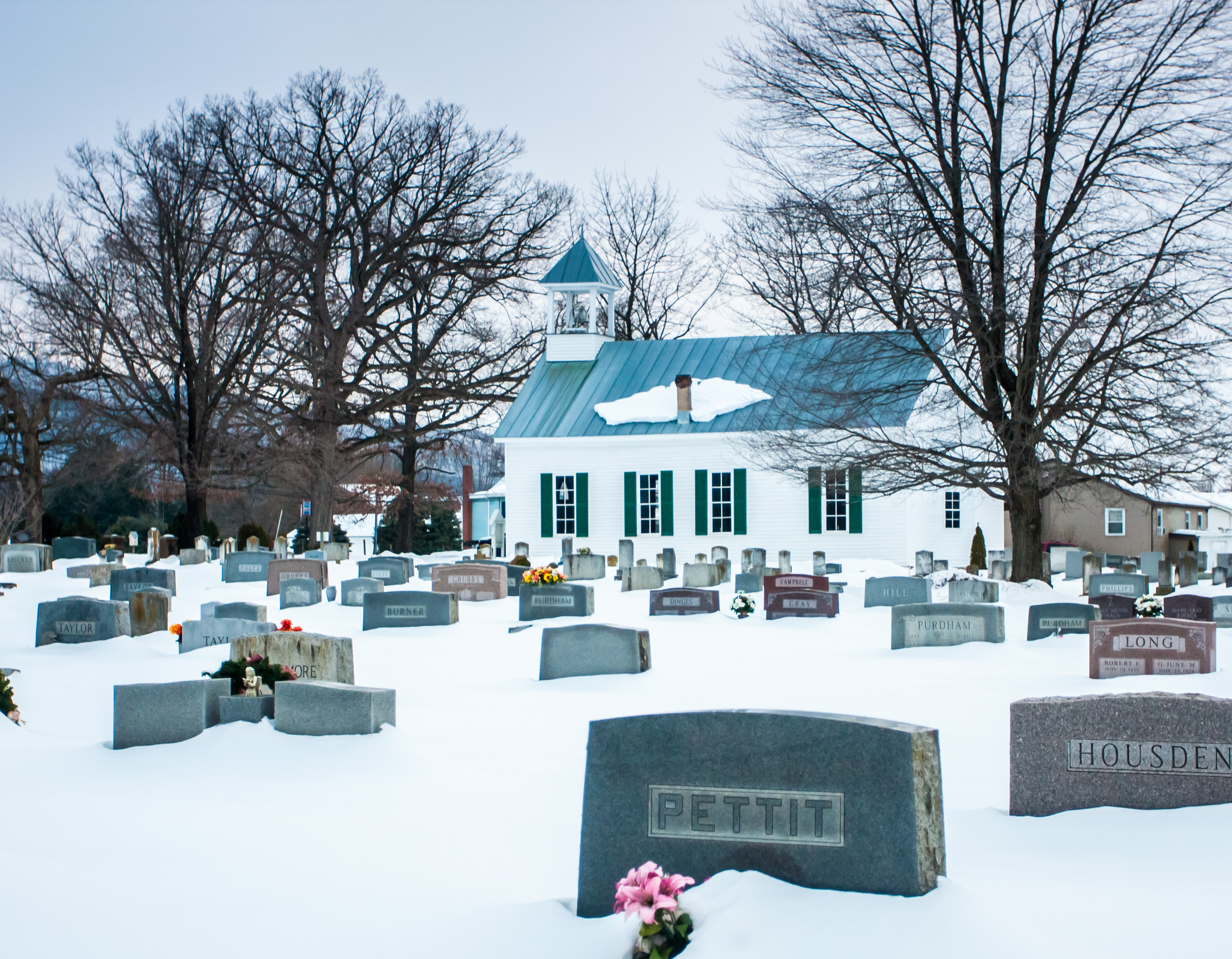
- Graves Chapel and Cemetery, February 2014

- Location within Virginia Location within the United States
- Location: 457 Chapel Rd., Stanley, Virginia
- Coordinates: 38°34′36″N 78°29′17″W
- Area: 4.7 acres (1.9 ha)
- Built: 1856, c. 1870
- Architectural style: Gothic Revival, Late Victorian
- NRHP reference No.: 08000481
- VLR No.: 303-0015

Significant dates
- Added to NRHP: May 29, 2008
- Designated VLR: March 20, 2008

Graves Chapel and Cemetery, also known as Graves Church, is a historic Methodist church located at Stanley, Page County, Virginia. It was built in 1856, and is a simple one-story, frame church building. It was enlarged about 1870. The center entry and flanking windows on the front gable end have Gothic Revival lancet arches and the gable roof is topped by and open belfry. Also on the property are the contributing church cemetery with burials dating to 1860, and the parsonage, a two-story frame residence built about 1893.

It was listed on the National Register of Historic Places in 2008.
