= Comertown, Virginia =

Unincorporated community in Virginia, US

Coordinates: 38°29′54″N 78°35′15″W

Comertown is an unincorporated community in Page County, in the U.S. state of Virginia.
