= Ingham, Virginia =

Unincorporated community in Virginia, US

Coordinates: 38°31′44″N 78°34′41″W

Ingham is an unincorporated community in Page County, in the U.S. state of Virginia.
