= Compton, Virginia =

Unincorporated community in Virginia, US

Coordinates: 38°46′57″N 78°22′08″W

Compton is an unincorporated community in Page County, in the U.S. state of Virginia.
