= Mundellsville, Virginia =

Coordinates: 38°39.245′N 78°27.743′W

Mundellsville, Virginia was a community that developed in the late 18th century, near present-day Luray, Virginia, in Page County, Virginia. Located on the west branch of the Hawksbill Creek and predating the 1812 founding of Luray, little evidence of the once thriving village remains today, with the exception of a private residence and Willow Grove Mill. Typical of flour mills found in this area in the late 1800s and early 1900s, the present version of Willow Grove Mill was built after the American Civil War; the original having been destroyed in October 1864, during the portion of Gen. Philip Sheridan's 1864 Shenandoah Valley Campaign known as "the Burning." The village of Mundellsville was also the birthplace of Dr. Henry Ruffner, the first state superintendent of schools in Virginia under the constitution of 1869.
