= Stony Man, Virginia =

- Unincorporated community
- Location within Virginia Location within the United States
- Coordinates: 38°37′50″N 78°26′4″W
- Country: United States
- State: Virginia
- County: Page
- Elevation: 912 ft (278 m)
- Time zone: UTC−5 (Eastern (EST))
  - Summer (DST): UTC−4 (EDT)
- GNIS feature ID: 1496267

Stony Man is an unincorporated community in Page County, in the U.S. state of Virginia. It was also known as Blossersville.
