= Shenandoah Historic District =

Historic district in Virginia, United States

- U.S. National Register of Historic Places
- U.S. Historic district
- Virginia Landmarks Register
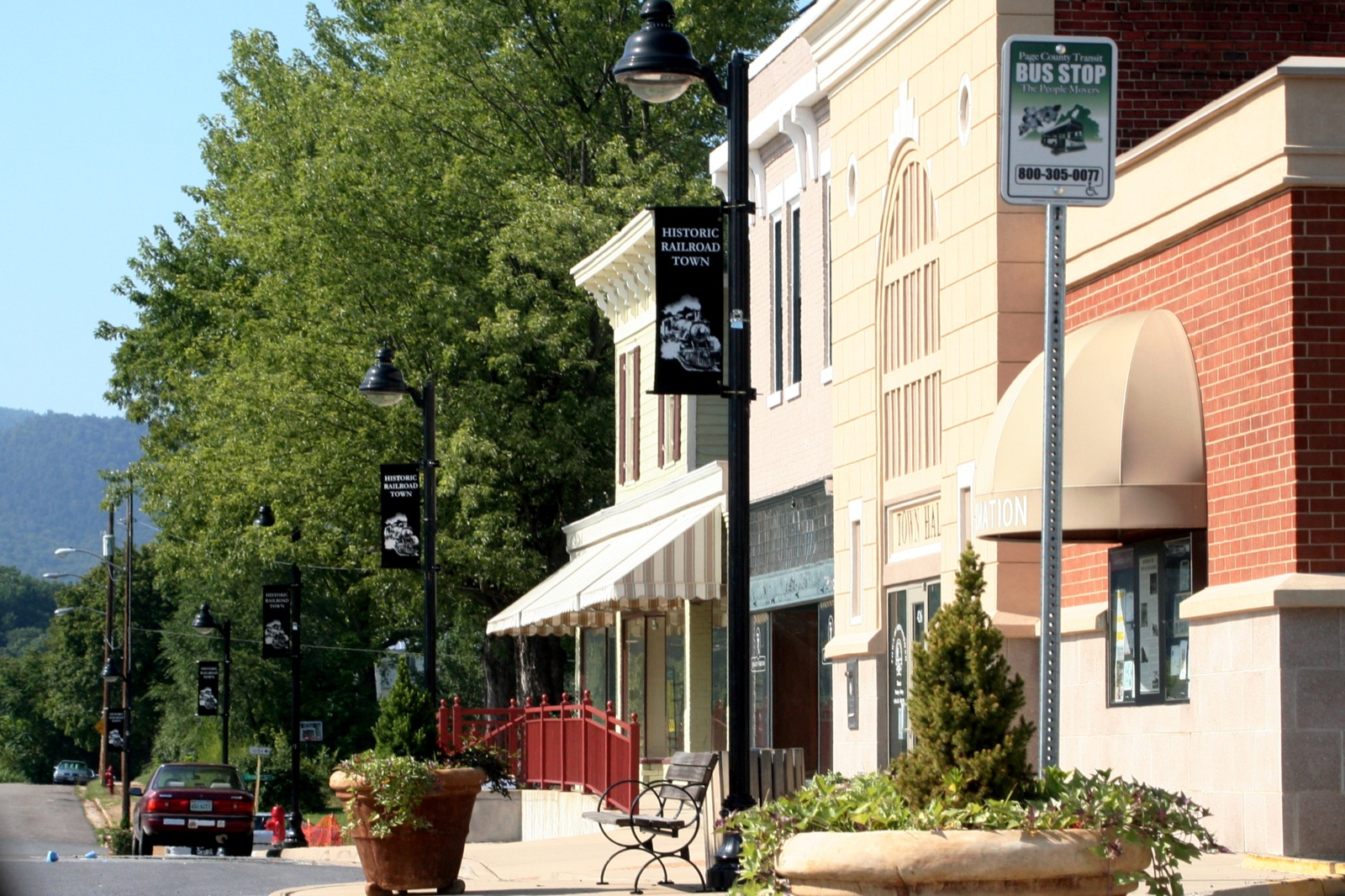
- Downtown Shenandoah, September 2008

- Location within Virginia Location within the United States
- Location: Parts of First, Second, Third, Fourth, Fifth, Sixth, Seventh, Eighth, Denver, Long, H Sts; Central, Maryland, Penn, and Virginia Aves., Shenandoah, Virginia
- Coordinates: 38°29′19″N 78°37′27″W
- Area: 198 acres (80 ha)
- Built: 1881
- Architect: Poindexter, William M.; et al.
- Architectural style: Late Victorian, Late 19th And 20th Century Revivals
- NRHP reference No.: 04000554
- VLR No.: 299-0033

Significant dates
- Added to NRHP: May 27, 2004
- Designated VLR: March 17, 2004

Shenandoah Historic District is a national historic district located at Shenandoah, Page County, Virginia. The district includes 451 contributing buildings, 3 contributing sites, and 4 contributing structures in the town of Shenandoah. They include residential, commercial, and institutional buildings in a variety of popular late-19th century and early-20th century architectural styles. Notable buildings include the Eagle Hotel and annex, Norfolk and Western Railway YMCA, Shenandoah General Store (c. 1920), Fields United Methodist Church, Christ United Methodist Church, St. Peter's Lutheran Church, Norfolk and Western Railway Station (c. 1915), and Shenandoah High School. Located in the district is the separately listed Shenandoah Land and Improvement Company Office.

It was listed on the National Register of Historic Places in 2004.
