= Fleeburg, Virginia =

Unincorporated community in Virginia, US

Coordinates: 38°28′22″N 78°35′41″W

Fleeburg is an unincorporated community in Page County, in the U.S. state of Virginia.
