= Furnace, Virginia =

Human settlement in Page County, Virginia, United States

Coordinates: 38°26′48″N 78°33′27″W

Furnace is an unincorporated community in Page County, in the U.S. state of Virginia.
