= Ben Huffman =

American baseball player (1914-2005)

- Catcher
- Born: July 18, 1914; Rileyville, Virginia
- Died: February 22, 2005 (aged 90); Luray, Virginia
- Batted: Left Threw: Right

MLB debut
- April 23, 1937, for the St. Louis Browns

Last MLB appearance
- October 2, 1937, for the St. Louis Browns

MLB statistics
- Batting average: .273
- Home runs: 1
- Runs batted in: 24
- Stats at Baseball Reference

Teams
- St. Louis Browns (1937)

Benjamin Franklin Huffman (July 18, 1914 – February 22, 2005) was a catcher in Major League Baseball. He played for the St. Louis Browns in 1937.
