= Ida, Virginia =

Unincorporated community in Virginia, US

Coordinates: 38°35′20″N 78°25′26″W

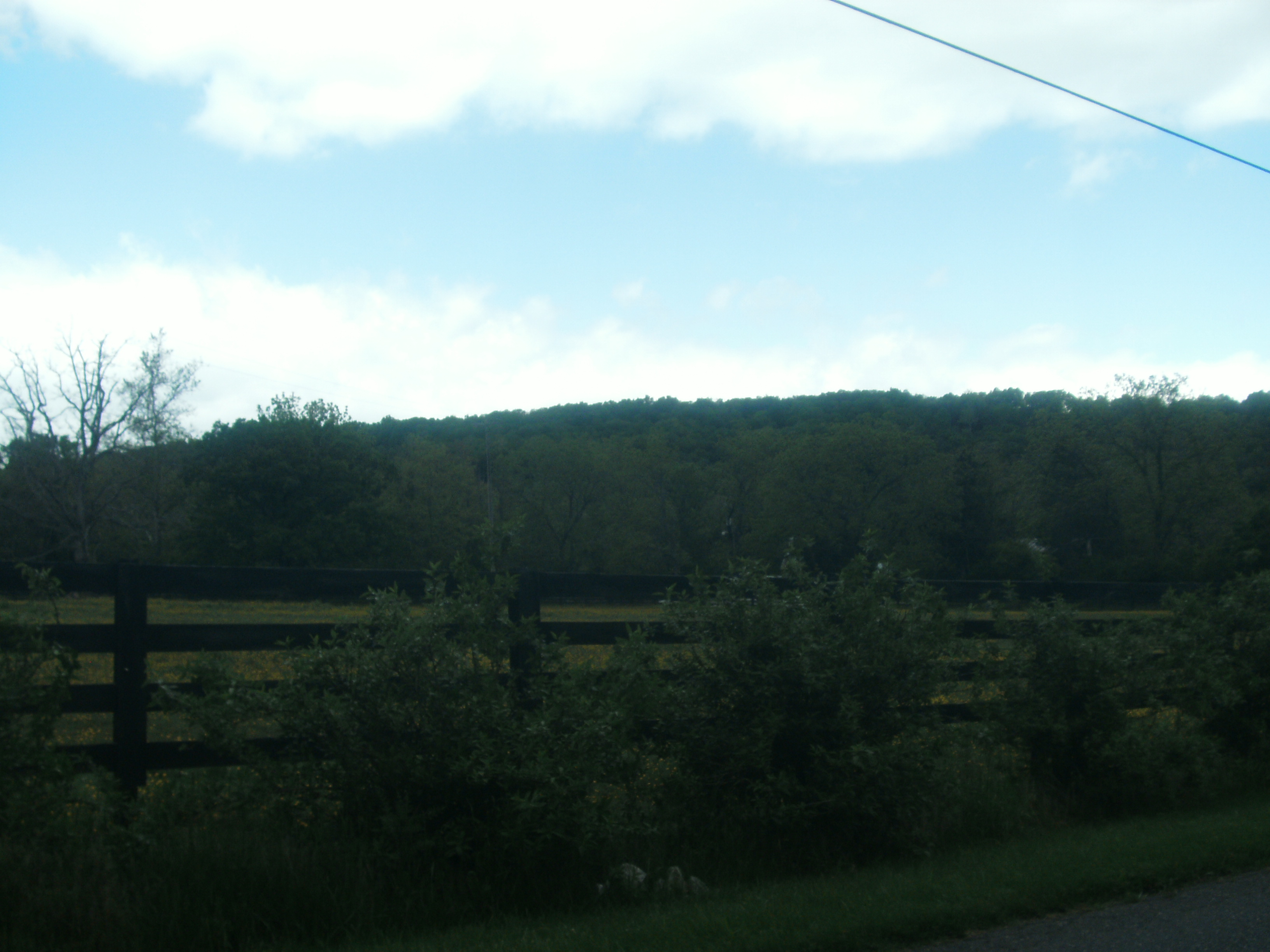
Landscape in Ida

Ida is an unincorporated community in Page County, in the U.S. state of Virginia.
