= Cavetown, Virginia =

Unincorporated community in Virginia, US

Coordinates: 38°36′55″N 78°26′56″W

Cavetown is an unincorporated community in Page County, in the U.S. state of Virginia.
