= Marksville, Virginia =

Unincorporated community in Virginia, US

Coordinates: 38°34′30″N 78°28′46″W

Marksville is an unincorporated community in Page County, in the U.S. state of Virginia.
