= Floyd Baker =

American baseball player (1916–2004)

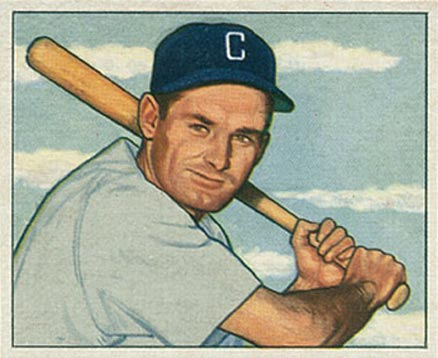
- Baker in 1950
- Third baseman / Second baseman
- Born: October 10, 1916; Luray, Virginia, U.S.
- Died: November 16, 2004 (aged 88); Youngstown, Ohio, U.S.
- Batted: Left Threw: Right

MLB debut
- May 4, 1943, for the St. Louis Browns

Last MLB appearance
- May 4, 1955, for the Philadelphia Phillies

MLB statistics
- Batting average: .251
- Home runs: 1
- Runs batted in: 196
- Stats at Baseball Reference

Teams
- St. Louis Browns (1943–1944); Chicago White Sox (1945–1951); Washington Senators (1952–1953); Boston Red Sox (1953–1954); Philadelphia Phillies (1954–1955)

Floyd Wilson Baker (October 10, 1916 – November 16, 2004) was an American professional baseball third baseman, who played Major League Baseball (MLB) for the St. Louis Browns (1943–1944), Chicago White Sox (1945–1951), Washington Senators (1952–1953), Boston Red Sox (1953–1954), and Philadelphia Phillies (1954–1955). During a 13-season career, Baker posted a .251 batting average, with one home run, and 196 RBI, in 874 games played.

== Early years ==
Baker was born in Luray, Virginia, and attended Luray High School. He gained early recognition as a left-handed batter and right-handed thrower in amateur clubs and broke into the minor leagues in 1938.

== Major league career ==
In 1943, Baker earned his first trial in the major leagues with the St. Louis Browns, after hitting .326 for there San Antonio Missions of the Texas League in 1942. In 1944, his sophomore MLB season, he was a reserve infielder for the 1944 Browns, the only St. Louis-based edition of that franchise to ever win an American League pennant. Baker then appeared in games 5 and 6 of the 1944 World Series against its intercity rivals, the Cardinals, going hitless in two at bats and handling two chances without an error in relief of veteran second baseman Don Gutteridge.

On December 30, 1944, Baker was acquired by the Chicago White Sox, where he played in 590 games over seven seasons. His best overall statistical season came in 1949 when he compiled 40 runs batted in, 101 hits, 15 doubles, four triples, and played 125 games — all career-highs. He hit his lone big-league home run on May 4, a two-run blow struck off Washington's Sid Hudson on May 4 at Comiskey Park. That year Baker also tied the major league mark for a third baseman, taking part in three double plays in one game, and led American League third-sackers in fielding percentage, with .978. Then, in 1950, he batted .317 in 83 games.

Baker became a Washington scout in 1957. In 1961, the old Senators franchise's first season in Minneapolis–Saint Paul, he returned to uniform as the third base coach for the renamed Minnesota Twins, a position he held through 1964. Baker then resumed his former role as a scout for the Twins until his retirement in 1995.

== Later years ==
During his career as a scout, Baker was based in Youngstown, Ohio, where his feats as a player for the Youngstown Browns were part of local baseball lore. In 1977, The Youngstown Vindicator reported: "Floyd Baker, who thrilled local Middle-Atlantic League fans with his classy fielding, still has his hand in the game. A local resident, Baker scouts for Minnesota. Baker, incidentally, started a triple play in the first game he played here".

Floyd Baker died in Youngstown at the age of 88. He was buried in Forest Lawn Memorial Park Cemetery.
