= Stanley, Virginia =

- Town
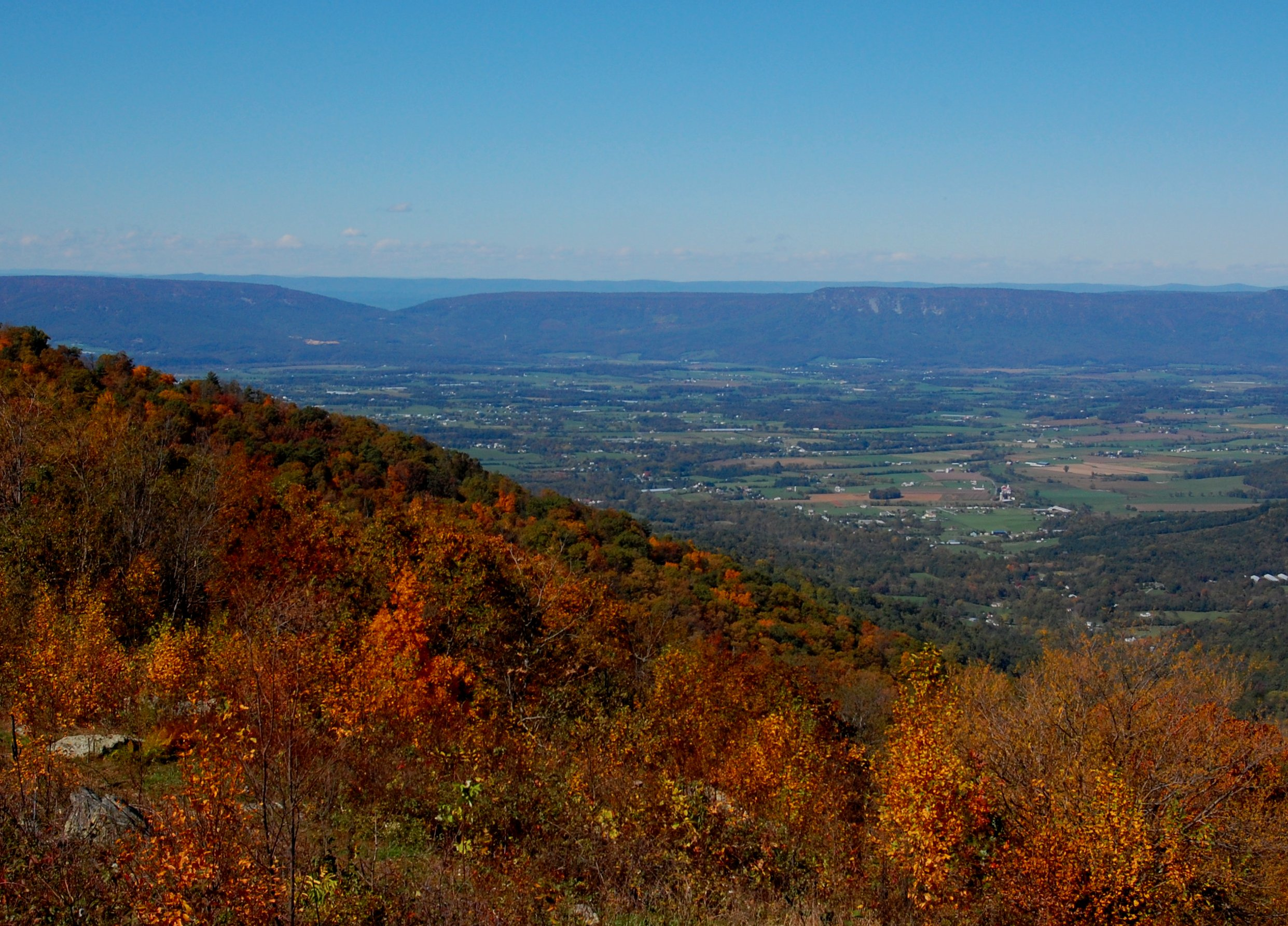
- Distant view from the Fisher's Gap overlook on Skyline Drive

- Logo

- Location of Stanley within the Page county
- Coordinates: 38°34′37″N 78°30′02″W
- Country: United States
- State: Virginia
- County: Page

Area
  - Total: 1.44 sq mi (3.72 km^{2})
  - Land: 1.43 sq mi (3.71 km^{2})
  - Water: 0.0039 sq mi (0.01 km^{2})
- Elevation: 1,086 ft (331 m)

Population (2020)
  - Total: 1,703
  - Density: 1,167.2/sq mi (450.66/km^{2})
- Time zone: UTC−5 (Eastern (EST))
  - Summer (DST): UTC−4 (EDT)
- ZIP code: 22851
- Area code: 540
- FIPS code: 51-75024
- GNIS feature ID: 2391426
- Website: townofstanley.com

Stanley is a town in Page County, Virginia, United States. As of the 2020 census, Stanley had a population of 1,703.

== History ==
Fort Philip Long and Graves Chapel and Cemetery are listed on the National Register of Historic Places.

== Geography ==
Stanley is located at 38°34′40″N 78°30′32″W (38.577649, −78.508980).

According to the United States Census Bureau, the town has a total area of 1.1 square miles (2.8 km^{2}), all land.

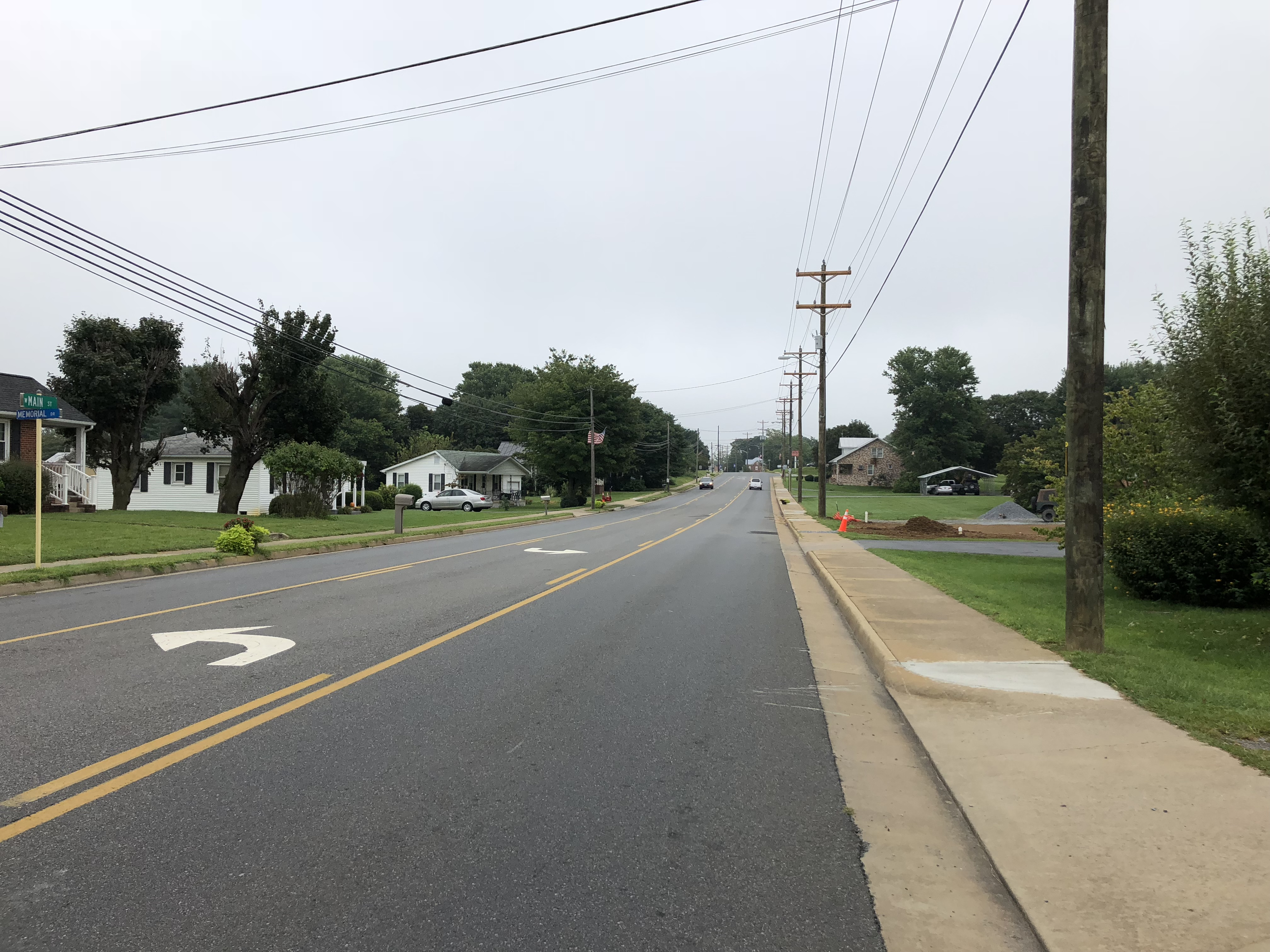
US 340 Bus through Stanley

== Transportation ==
The only primary highway directly serving Stanley is U.S. Route 340 Business, which is the main road northeast and southwest out of Stanley. To the northeast, US 340 Bus travels to Luray, rejoins U.S. Route 340, and continues northeast towards Front Royal. To the southwest, US 340 Bus rejoins US 340 and continues on to Shenandoah, Elkton and Waynesboro.

== Demographics ==
Historical population
Census	Pop.	Note	%±
1910	218		—
1920	449		106.0%
1930	259		−42.3%
1940	317		22.4%
1950	399		25.9%
1960	1,039		160.4%
1970	1,208		16.3%
1980	1,204		−0.3%
1990	1,186		−1.5%
2000	1,326		11.8%
2010	1,689		27.4%
2020	1,703		0.8%
U.S. Decennial Census

=== 2020 census ===
As of the 2020 census, Stanley had a population of 1,703. The median age was 43.3 years. 22.2% of residents were under the age of 18 and 19.8% of residents were 65 years of age or older. For every 100 females there were 89.0 males, and for every 100 females age 18 and over there were 89.8 males age 18 and over.

0.0% of residents lived in urban areas, while 100.0% lived in rural areas.

There were 709 households in Stanley, of which 28.5% had children under the age of 18 living in them. Of all households, 41.2% were married-couple households, 18.8% were households with a male householder and no spouse or partner present, and 31.0% were households with a female householder and no spouse or partner present. About 32.3% of all households were made up of individuals and 16.2% had someone living alone who was 65 years of age or older.

There were 782 housing units, of which 9.3% were vacant. The homeowner vacancy rate was 1.7% and the rental vacancy rate was 5.6%.

Racial composition as of the 2020 census
Race	Number	Percent
White	1,608	94.4%
Black or African American	9	0.5%
American Indian and Alaska Native	2	0.1%
Asian	4	0.2%
Native Hawaiian and Other Pacific Islander	0	0.0%
Some other race	23	1.4%
Two or more races	57	3.3%
Hispanic or Latino (of any race)	65	3.8%

=== Demographic estimates ===
As of the census of 2023, the population density was 1,203.8 people per square mile (464.8 people/km^{2}).

In the town, 9.8% of residents were ages 18 to 24, 28.0% were ages 25 to 44, and 22.4% were ages 45 to 64.

The median income for a household in the town was $25,917, and the median income for a family was $33,188. Males had a median income of $24,706 versus $18,850 for females. The per capita income for the town was $13,082. About 12.1% of families and 16.6% of the population were below the poverty line, including 22.8% of those under age 18 and 25.2% of those age 65 or over.

== Education ==
=== Public Schools ===
Page County Public Schools serve Stanley, along with other residents of Page County. Stanley Elementary serves the Stanley population with grades Pre-K through 5th grade. Page County Middle School and Page County High School serves the remainder of the grade levels for the southern end of Page County.

=== Technical Schools ===
Page County Technical Center, a part of Page County Public Schools system, serves adult and high school students with a variety of programs.
