= Blaineville, Virginia =

Unincorporated community in Virginia, US

Coordinates: 38°36′25″N 78°27′02″W

Blaineville is an unincorporated community in Page County, in the U.S. state of Virginia.
