= Wayne Comer =

American baseball player (1944–2023)

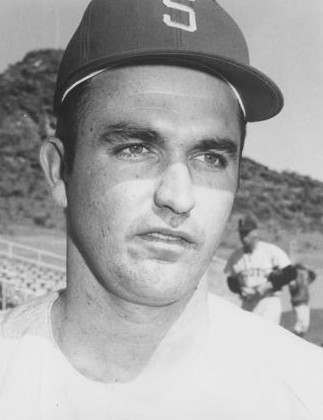
- Comer in 1969 with the Seattle Pilots
- Outfielder
- Born: February 3, 1944; Shenandoah, Virginia, U.S.
- Died: October 4, 2023 (aged 79); Shenandoah, Virginia, U.S.
- Batted: Right Threw: Right

MLB debut
- September 17, 1967, for the Detroit Tigers

Last MLB appearance
- August 2, 1972, for the Detroit Tigers

MLB statistics
- Batting average: .229
- Home runs: 16
- Runs batted in: 67
- Stats at Baseball Reference

Teams
- Detroit Tigers (1967–1968); Seattle Pilots / Milwaukee Brewers (1969–1970); Washington Senators (1970); Detroit Tigers (1972)

Career highlights and awards
- World Series champion (1968)

Harry Wayne Comer (February 3, 1944 – October 4, 2023) was an American Major League Baseball outfielder. He played professional baseball for 13 seasons from 1962 through 1974, including stints with four major league teams: the Detroit Tigers (1967, 1968, 1972), the Seattle Pilots / Milwaukee Brewers (1969–1970), and the Washington Senators (1970).

In 1969, Comer's only full season in the majors, he led the Seattle Pilots in runs scored, led the American League in double plays turned as an outfielder, and ranked second in the American League in assists from the outfield. He was also a member of the 1968 Detroit Tigers and compiled a perfect 1.000 postseason batting average with a pinch-hit single off Joe Hoerner in his only at bat in Game 3 of the 1968 World Series.

== Early years ==
Comer was born on February 3, 1944, in Shenandoah, Virginia, a son of Harry Junior Comer and Oneta Pearl Lucas Comer. He was raised there and attended Page County High School. He was an all-around athlete in high school, playing baseball, basketball and football. He was selected as an all-state player in football.

== Playing career ==
=== Minor leagues ===
Comer was originally signed in 1962 by the Washington Senators as an amateur free agent. He made his professional debut that year for the Class-B Raleigh Capitals, batting .229 with three home runs and 28 runs batted in (RBI) in 78 games.

In March 1963, Comer was traded to the Detroit Tigers for Bobo Osborne. He spent the 1963 season with the Lakeland Tigers in the Florida State League. He next played for the Duluth–Superior Dukes in 1964 and the Montgomery Rebels in 1965. In 1965, he led the Southern League with 31 stolen bases, compiled a .285 batting average, and hit nine home runs while recording 54 RBI in 123 games. At the end of the 1965 season, he was named to the Southern League All-Star Team.

Comer began the 1966 season with the Syracuse Chiefs of the International League. However, after only 35 games with the Chiefs, he was traded to the Toledo Mud Hens in exchange for outfielder Art Lopez. He was the Mud Hens' starting center fielder in 1966 and compiled a .266 batting average with 11 home runs and 52 RBI in 131 games.

During the 1967 season, Comer compiled a career-high .290 batting average with 11 home runs, 58 RBI and a .363 on-base percentage in 137 games. He also led the International League in runs scored, total bases, and putouts and assists by an outfielder. At the end of the 1967 season, he was named by the National Association of Baseball Writers to the 1967 East Triple-A All-Star team.

=== Detroit Tigers ===
In September 1967, Comer was called up by the Detroit Tigers. He made his major league debut on September 17, 1967, and appeared in four games that season. With one hit in three at bats, he compiled a .333 batting average.

The following year, Comer began the season in Toledo but was called up by the Tigers after Al Kaline broke a bone in his forearm in late May 1968. Comer appeared in 48 games for the 1968 Detroit Tigers, principally as a backup outfielder. He compiled a .125 batting average with one triple, one home run and 3 RBI in 48 at bats. Comer made an appearance in Game 3 of the 1968 World Series, getting a pinch-hit single off Joe Hoerner in his only at bat for a perfect 1.000 World Series batting average.

=== Seattle Pilots ===
On October 15, 1968, Comer was claimed by the newly formed Seattle Pilots as the 41st pick in the 1968 expansion draft. In 1969, Comer was an every day starter for the Pilots in the outfield, mostly in center field. He led the team in runs scored with 88. He was also second on the Pilots in home runs with 15, trailing Don Mincher. Comer also stole 18 bases, and his combined "Power/Speed Number" was 16.4 — eighth best in the American League. He also led the American League in 1969 with six double plays turned as an outfielder. His 14 assists from the outfield ranked second in the American League. In 1970, the Pilots moved to Milwaukee and became the Milwaukee Brewers. Comer appeared in 13 games for the Brewers and compiled an .059 batting average (1-for-17) with one RBI.

=== Washington Senators ===
On May 10, 1970, Comer was traded by the Brewers to the Washington Senators for Hank Allen and Ron Theobald. Comer appeared in 77 games for the Senators, compiling a .233 batting average (.346 on-base percentage) with 8 RBI in 129 at bats.

=== Detroit Tigers ===
On December 5, 1970, Comer was purchased by the Detroit Tigers from the Senators. He spent the 1971 season with the Toledo Mud Hens, appearing in 136 games with a .279 batting average, nine home runs, 51 RBI, and a .373 on-base percentage. He was called up by the Tigers for a portion of the 1972 season, appearing in 27 games mostly as a defensive replacement in the outfield. He had only one hit in nine at bats (.111) for the 1972 Tigers.

Comer continued to play in the minor leagues for two more years. He played for the Mud Hens in 1973 and the Reading Phillies in 1974.

== Later life ==
After retiring from baseball, Comer returned to Virginia. He served as the baseball coach at Spotswood High School for several years, was named Coach of the Year in 2000, and resigned after the 2006 season. From 2009 until 2023, he coached at Page County High School in Virginia.

Comer was married in January 1963 to Joyce Nauman. They had three sons, Timothy Wayne (born 1965), Paul Allen (born 1968), and Shaun Christopher (born 1980).

On October 4, 2023, it was reported that Comer had died at the age of 79.
