= Leaksville, Virginia =

Unincorporated community in Virginia, U.S.

Coordinates: 38°37′35″N 78°31′34″W

Leaksville is an unincorporated community in Page County, in the U.S. state of Virginia.
