= Alma, Virginia =

Human settlement in Page County, Virginia, United States

Coordinates: 38°35′28″N 78°33′27″W

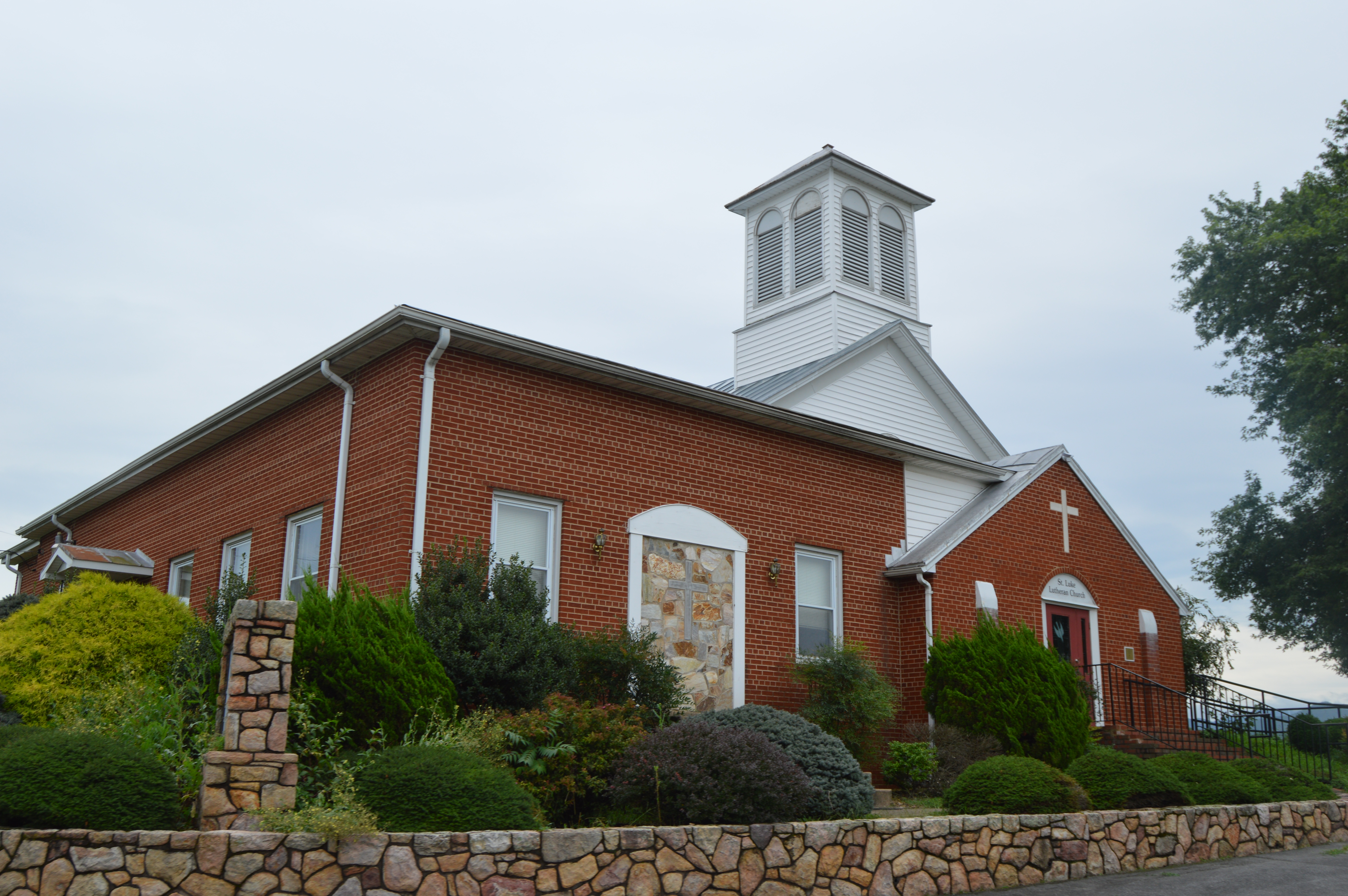
St. Luke's Lutheran Church

Alma is an unincorporated community in Page County, in the U.S. state of Virginia. The community is said to have been named, in the mid-1850s, by local doctor James Lee Gillespie. The doctor, who relocated to Page County circa 1851, is said to have been a follower of events of the Crimean War, and is believed to have named the little village either for the Battle of Alma or the Alma River, in Ukraine. From that, it is believed that the word is the Crimean Tatar word for apple.

== Notable person ==
- Charles D. Price (died 1974), farmer and member of the Virginia House of Delegates
