= Rileyville, Virginia =

Unincorporated community in Virginia, US

Coordinates: 38°45′54″N 78°23′17″W

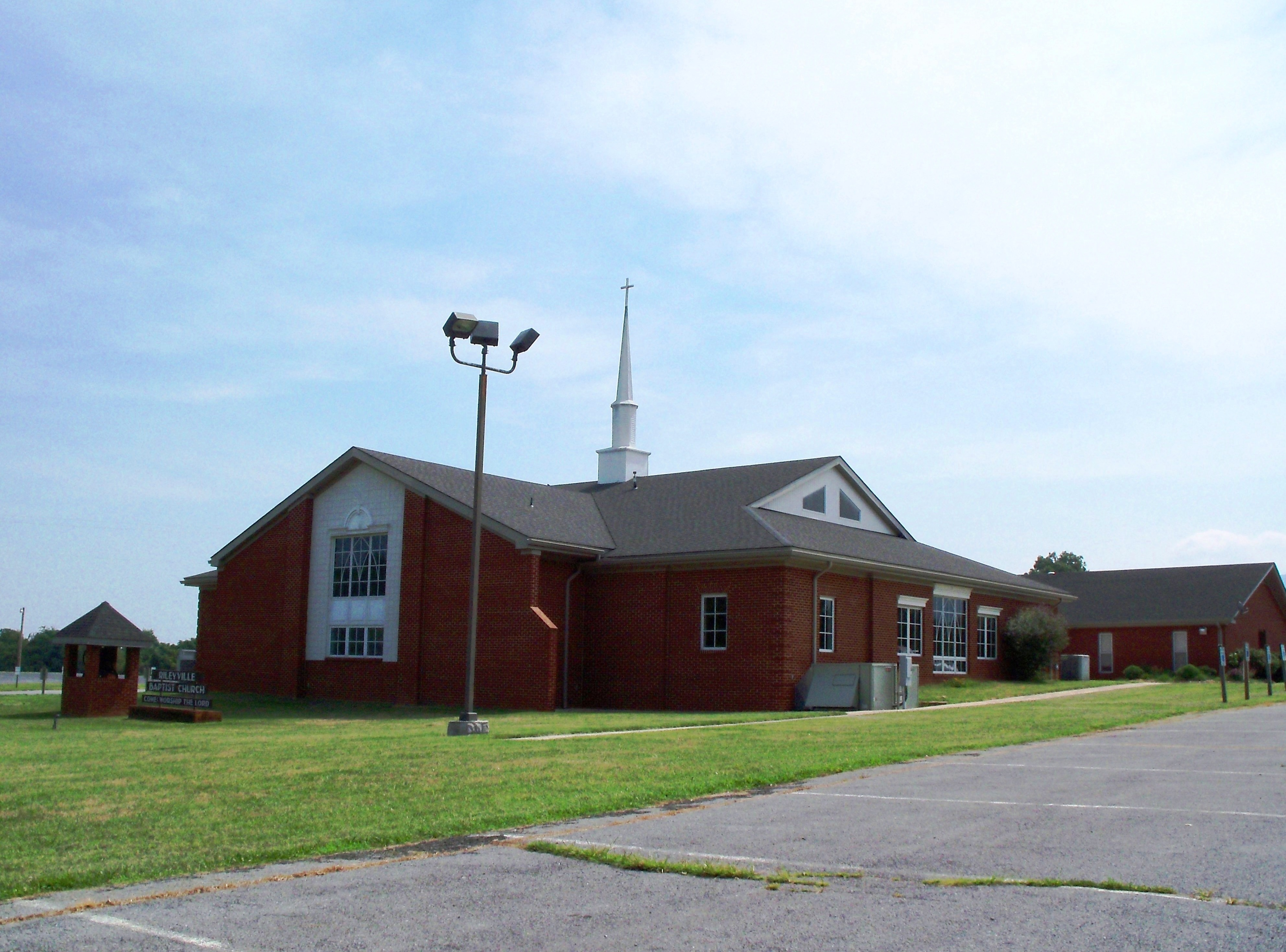
Rileyville Baptist Church in Rileyville

Rileyville is an unincorporated community in Page County, in the U.S. state of Virginia. The notable waterways of the locality are the Shenandoah River and Nelson Run.

Rileyville has a small United States Post Office, with its ZIP Code of 22650.

The village is served by the Page County Public School system, with residents attending Springfield Elementary School and Luray Middle School and Luray High School. The Page County Sheriff's Office provides public safety services, with the Luray Volunteer Fire Department providing first due fire service.
