= Shenandoah, Virginia =

- Town
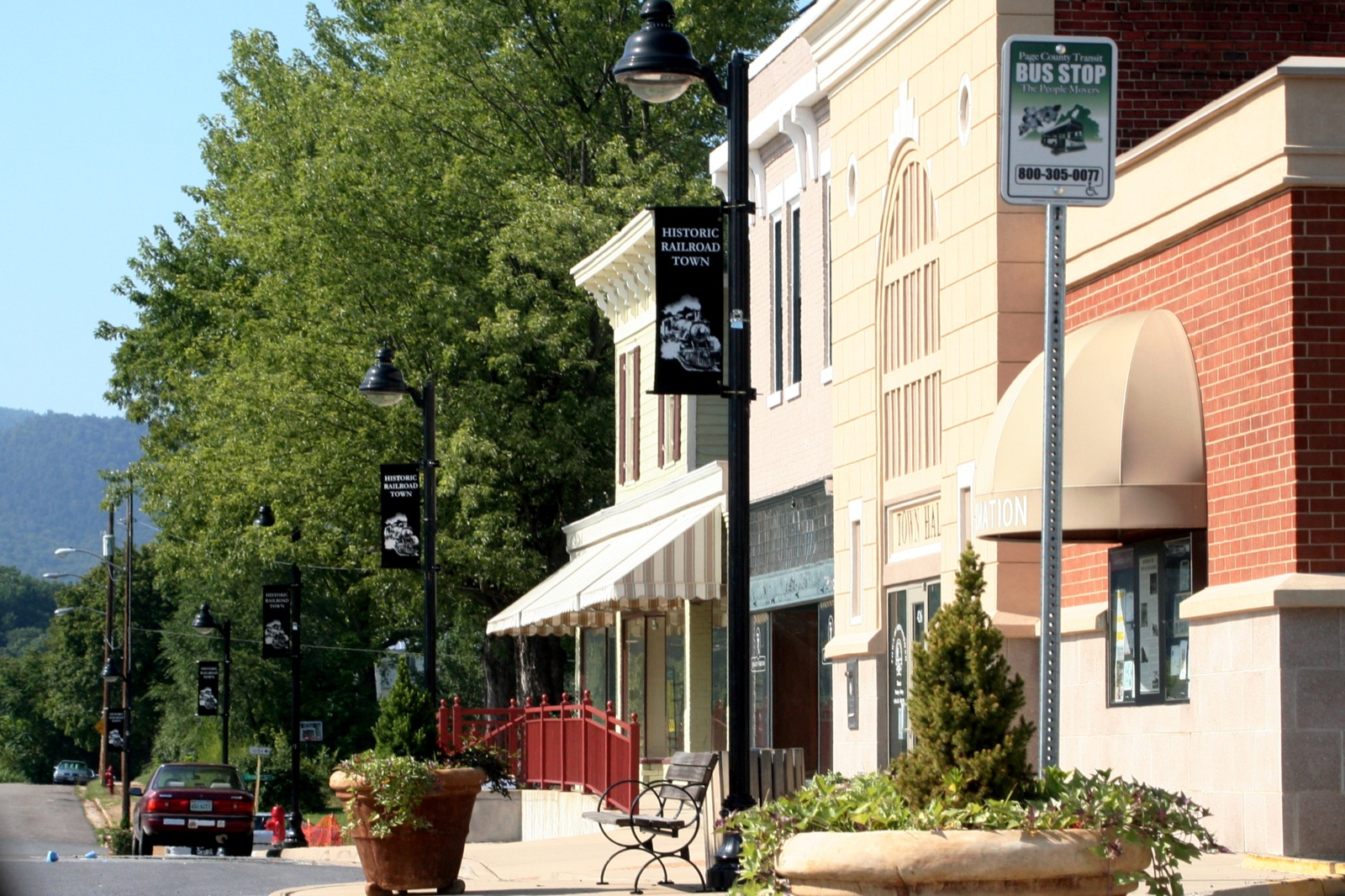
- Downtown Shenandoah

- Location of Shenandoah within the Page county

- Location within the state of Virginia Shenandoah (the United States)
- Coordinates: 38°29′34″N 78°37′35″W
- Country: United States
- State: Virginia
- County: Page

Area
  - Total: 2.26 sq mi (5.86 km^{2})
  - Land: 2.17 sq mi (5.61 km^{2})
  - Water: 0.097 sq mi (0.25 km^{2})
- Elevation: 1,037 ft (316 m)

Population (2020)
  - Total: 2,486
  - Density: 1,148/sq mi (443.1/km^{2})
- Time zone: UTC-5 (Eastern (EST))
  - Summer (DST): UTC-4 (EDT)
- ZIP code: 22849
- Area code: 540
- FIPS code: 51-71776
- GNIS feature ID: 2391410
- Website: www.townofshenandoah.com

Shenandoah /ˌʃɛnənˈdoʊə/ is a town in Page County, Virginia, United States. The population was 2,486 at the 2020 census.

== Geography ==
According to the United States Census Bureau, the town has a total area of 2.3 square miles (5.9 km^{2}), of which 2.2 square miles (5.6 km^{2}) is land and 0.1 square mile (0.2 km^{2}) (4.24%) is water. The town is nestled between the picturesque Blue Ridge Mountains and the Massanutten Ridge in Page County. Shenandoah is located 8 miles (13 km) west of Shenandoah National Park and 25 miles (40 km) northeast of Harrisonburg.

== Demographics ==
As of the census of 2000, there were 1,878 people, 764 households, and 541 families residing in the town. The population density was 1,419.0 people per square mile (549.3/km^{2}). There were 812 housing units at an average density of 613.5 per square mile (237.5/km^{2}). The racial makeup of the town was 96.81% White, 1.28% African American, 0.11% Native American, 0.11% Asian, 0.11% Pacific Islander, 0.91% from other races, and 0.69% from two or more races. Hispanic or Latino of any race were 1.54% of the population.

There were 764 households, out of which 30.0% had children under the age of 18 living with them, 51.8% were married couples living together, 14.0% had a female householder with no husband present, and 29.1% were non-families. 24.5% of all households were made up of individuals, and 12.3% had someone living alone who was 65 years of age or older. The average household size was 2.46 and the average family size was 2.87.

In the town, the population was spread out, with 24.2% under the age of 18, 7.8% from 18 to 24, 29.7% from 25 to 44, 22.7% from 45 to 64, and 15.6% who were 65 years of age or older. The median age was 38 years. For every 100 females there were 88.4 males. For every 100 females aged 18 and over, there were 83.4 males.

The median income for a household in the town was $33,929, and the median income for a family was $37,896. Males had a median income of $26,105 versus $20,833 for females. The per capita income for the town was $16,030. About 9.0% of families and 12.1% of the population were below the poverty line, including 16.0% of those under age 18 and 17.7% of those age 65 or over.

Historical population
Census	Pop.	Note	%±
1880	197		—
1890	751		281.2%
1900	1,220		62.5%
1910	1,431		17.3%
1920	1,895		32.4%
1930	1,980		4.5%
1940	1,829		−7.6%
1950	1,903		4.0%
1960	1,839		−3.4%
1970	1,714		−6.8%
1980	1,861		8.6%
1990	2,213		18.9%
2000	1,878		−15.1%
2010	2,373		26.4%
2020	2,486		4.8%
U.S. Decennial Census

== History ==
The town was founded in 1837 by two brothers, Daniel and Henry Forrer, who settled in the area to take advantage of the natural resources found in and around Shenandoah. The natural resources included extensive iron ore deposits, hardwood, high-grade limestone, and waterpower. The proximity to the South Fork of the Shenandoah River was also a great benefit and was later used by the Forrers to transport iron ore and other commodities produced by the Shenandoah Iron Works to broader markets downstream.

On February 20, 1838, the Forrers established the first post office in Shenandoah under the name Shenandoah Iron Works with Henry Forrer being the postmaster. Development of the town ensued thereafter with houses, businesses, and industries developed astride of the Shenandoah River. The Shenandoah Iron Works, which was owned and operated by Daniel and Henry Forrer, was also located along the riverbanks. Ten houses were built facing the river in the Furnace Hollow section of town by a man named Mr. Pee Dee, hence, the name of this section of town today. Other historical structures were also built including Stephens Cottage, the South Fork House, Mt. Lebanon United Church at Comertown, and the Old Verbena Mill in Verbena, just south of town off Route 340.

The Town of Shenandoah played an instrumental role in the Civil War. Three iron ore furnaces around Shenandoah smelted raw iron into pig iron. Unlike during the pre-war years when pig iron was shipped on flat boats on the Shenandoah River to Harpers Ferry, during the war, the pig iron was shipped by wagon to Gordonsville, and subsequently by rail to Richmond for use at the Tredegar Iron Works. In addition to the pig iron, cannonballs were manufactured at some of the local furnaces and shipped out, along with gunpowder from a local gunpowder plant, for use by the Confederacy.

After the Civil War, two men, William Milnes, Jr. and Thomas Johns came to Shenandoah in 1866 and purchased 32,000 acres (130 km^{2}) including the Forrer's Shenandoah Iron Works. These men continued the iron works; however, they introduced modern tools and machinery that were patented in order to improve production.

One of the major distinctions of the Town of Shenandoah is its flood prone nature due to its close proximity to the Shenandoah River. Time and time again, the town has been ravaged with floods. With all of the major development of the time occurring in or near the flood plain area, it was only a matter of time before a major flood wiped out the entire town.

On September 28 and 29, 1870, the inevitable happened when flood waters decimated the entire developed portion of Shenandoah. Between 30 and 60 buildings were completely destroyed or washed away as the water of the South Fork of the Shenandoah River billowed its way through town.

Despite the wrath of the flood, William Milnes was able to take charge of the town and rebuild with relative ease. At the time of the flood, the entire country was experiencing prosperity due to an industrial boom. Milnes took this opportunity to spearhead the Shenandoah Valley Railroad, which would begin in Roanoke, Virginia and wind through the Shenandoah Valley to Hagerstown, Maryland. Milnes' persistence led to the Shenandoah Valley Railroad being built along with the installation of a telegraph line. The town is now rich in railroad history.

Through the work of William Milnes, Shenandoah became the midpoint between Roanoke, Virginia and Harrisburg, Pennsylvania and enabled town industries to ship out their goods through means other than the river. Milnes took advantage of the railroad's presence and erected the Big Gem Cast Iron Furnace. The Big Gem was completed in 1882 and produced 110 tons of iron ore per day. It became a popular tourist destination as well because of the sparks that could be viewed each night as red hot cinder was poured down the cinder bank. The Big Gem literally lit up the entire town.

On June 27, 1882, the post office name was changed from Shenandoah Iron Works to Milnes in honor of William Milnes. The town also became incorporated on February 12, 1884, by an Act of the General Assembly. The town name was also changed to Milnes.

The railroad tracks that were built paralleled the river flood plain and Front Street, which is now modern day First Street. The area in and around Front Street became the town's commercial hub as business were constructed facing the rail yard. Front Street became a thriving "Main St. Community," as hundreds of people would come to the downtown to shop and watch the trains pass by. In 1957, however, Norfolk and Western Railroad closed its major maintenance and operations facilities along the Front Street corridor. Since this time, only a handful of businesses remain, and buildings have deteriorated. The only thing that remains is the aura of the "good old days." In 1890, the town name was changed from Milnes to Shenandoah City by an Act of the General Assembly. Since this time, the town has parted with the City portion of the name.

The year of 1890 also was the year of another great "Boom" as Shenandoah experienced a period of rapid growth. The Shenandoah Land and Improvement Company bought land around town and surveyed the corporate limits. Streets were staked and a map of the town was produced. Many buildings were erected during this period of growth by the Shenandoah Land and Improvement Company. Most of the structures that were built by the Land and Improvement Company are no longer visible due to fires which are also a distinct feature of the town's history.

=== 20th century ===
Between 1890 and 1907, depression swept through the entire country. This depression affected Shenandoah as businesses closed and went bankrupt. Others, such as the luxurious town hotel, "The Shenandoah," were destroyed by a fire in 1891. Floods in 1896 washed away the river bridge, and yet another fire destroyed the town bank.

In 1907, the Big Gem Furnace discontinued operations and parts of the land were sold off. The Big Gem was dismantled in 1917 and the land passed ownership to the Lukens Steel Company who donated the land to the town on September 27, 1995. The land, 68.6 acres (278,000 m^{2}), became the site of an outdoor recreational park which was named "Big Gem Park" after the Big Gem Furnace.

Since the railroad downgraded its facilities along First St. in 1957, the downtown has remained dormant. Most of the town's growth has occurred along the Route 340 corridor, which runs the entire length of Page County. Currently, the town has plans to revitalize Shenandoah, which like most other small, rural towns in America, suffered from the popularity of strip malls and the development of large shopping centers. The town would like to revive "Old Front Street," develop the Big Gem Furnace tract, and play on its rich railroad history and proximity to such popular tourist destinations as Luray Caverns, Massanutten Resort, and the Shenandoah National Park.

=== 21st century ===
Shenandoah's downtown was hit by a fire on May 23, 2006. Two stores and one residential building were destroyed. The inferno raged for over 18 hours despite seven fire companies' efforts to battle the blaze.

A second large fire struck the downtown area on March 27, 2007. Again, seven fire companies responded to the fire that burned for nearly ten hours. Three structures were destroyed and four were damaged.

The Commonwealth of Virginia gave the town numerous grants for the beautification of its once-destroyed Main Street (First Street) area. The Page County Board of Supervisors agreed to accept a $7.8 million state grant application on September 9, 2021, aimed at bringing wireless broadband to every home in the county. Previously, Shenandoah was the only town in Page County to have wireless broadband.

The Shenandoah Historic District, Shenandoah Land and Improvement Company Office, Strickler–Louderback House, and Welfley-Shuler House are listed on the National Register of Historic Places.

As of 2017, Norfolk Southern owns a large railyard across from First Street. On a typical day, 10 to 15 trains can be seen in the yard. On the north end of the yard, there are remains of the old Norfolk and Western shops. These shops were abandoned in the late due to the switch to diesel locomotives.

== Transportation ==
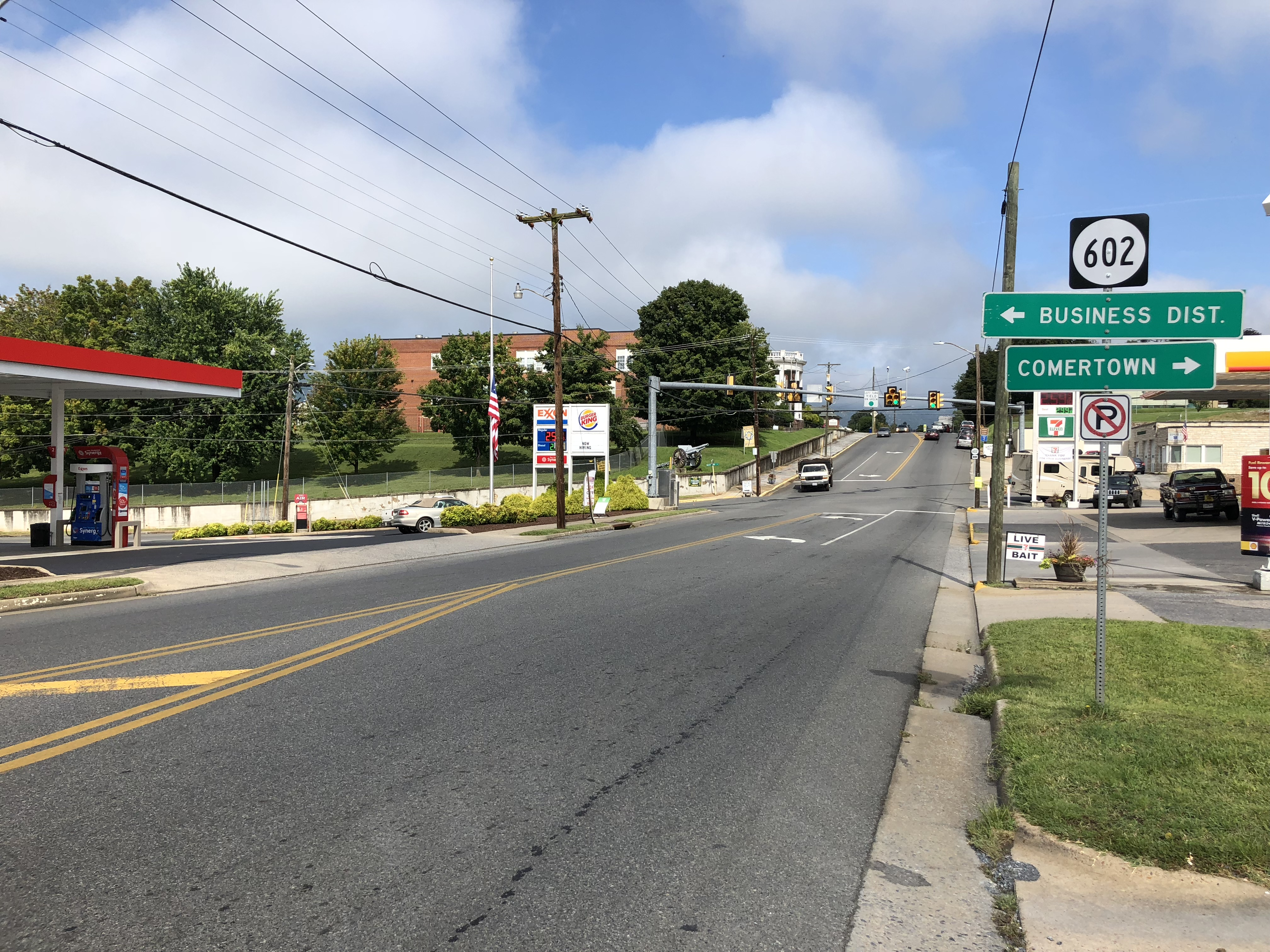
View north along US 340 in Shenandoah

The primary road in and out of Shenandoah is US 340. Additional local roads facilitate travel to the nearby rural areas.

== Notable people ==
- Ed Austin (July 15, 1926 – April 23, 2011) was the mayor of Jacksonville, Florida.
- Wayne Comer (February 3, 1944 – October 4, 2023) was a Major League Baseball player.
- William Milnes Jr. (December 8, 1827 – August 14, 1889) was a nineteenth-century congressman and industrialist from Virginia and Pennsylvania.
- Kenneth R. Plum (born November 3, 1941) is a Democrat in the Virginia House of Delegates.
