= Page County, Virginia =

County in Virginia, United States

- County
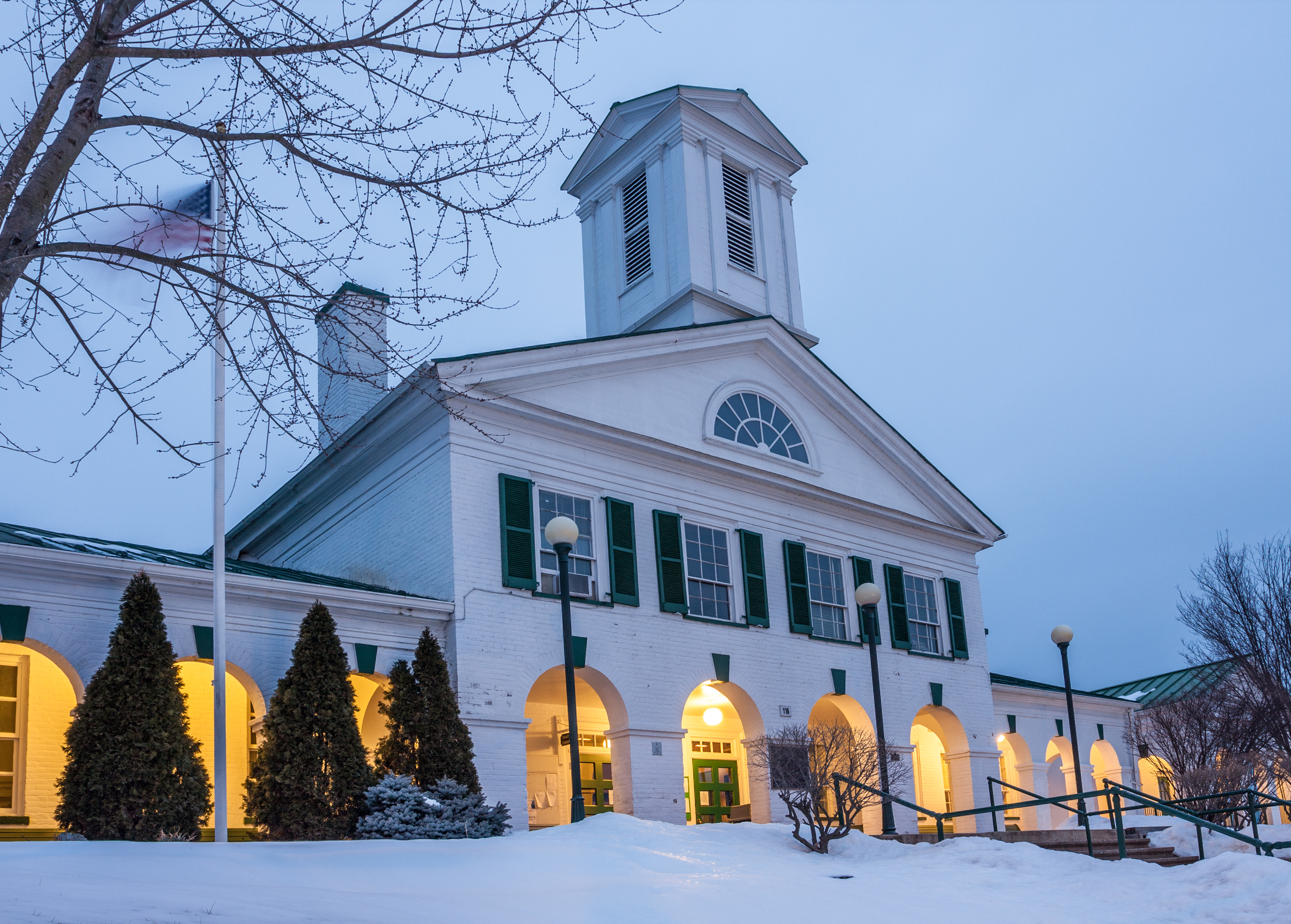
- Page County Courthouse in February 2014

- Flag Seal Logo

- Location within the U.S. state of Virginia
- Coordinates: 38°37′N 78°29′W
- Country: United States
- State: Virginia
- Founded: 1831
- Named for: John Page
- Seat: Luray
- Largest town: Luray

Area
  - Total: 314 sq mi (810 km^{2})
  - Land: 311 sq mi (810 km^{2})
  - Water: 3.2 sq mi (8.3 km^{2}) 1.0%

Population (2020)
  - Total: 23,709
  - Estimate (2025): 23,762 ▲
  - Density: 76.2/sq mi (29.4/km^{2})
- Time zone: UTC−5 (Eastern)
  - Summer (DST): UTC−4 (EDT)
- ZIP Codes: 22650, 22827, 22835, 22849, 22851
- Area code: 540, 826
- Congressional district: 6th
- Website: www.pagecounty.virginia.gov

Page County is located in the Commonwealth of Virginia. As of the 2020 census, the population was 23,709. Its county seat is Luray. Page County was formed in 1831 from Shenandoah and Rockingham counties and was named for John Page, Governor of Virginia from 1802 to 1805.

== Geography ==
According to the U.S. Census Bureau, the county has a total area of 314 square miles (810 km^{2}), of which 311 square miles (810 km^{2}) is land and 3.2 square miles (8.3 km^{2}) (1.0%) is water. The highest point in Page County is Hawksbill Mountain, which is located along the border with Madison County within Shenandoah National Park.

=== Adjacent counties ===
- Shenandoah County – northwest
- Warren County – north
- Rappahannock County – east
- Madison County – southeast
- Greene County – southeast
- Rockingham County – south

=== National protected area ===
- George Washington National Forest (part)
- Shenandoah National Park (part)

=== Major highways ===
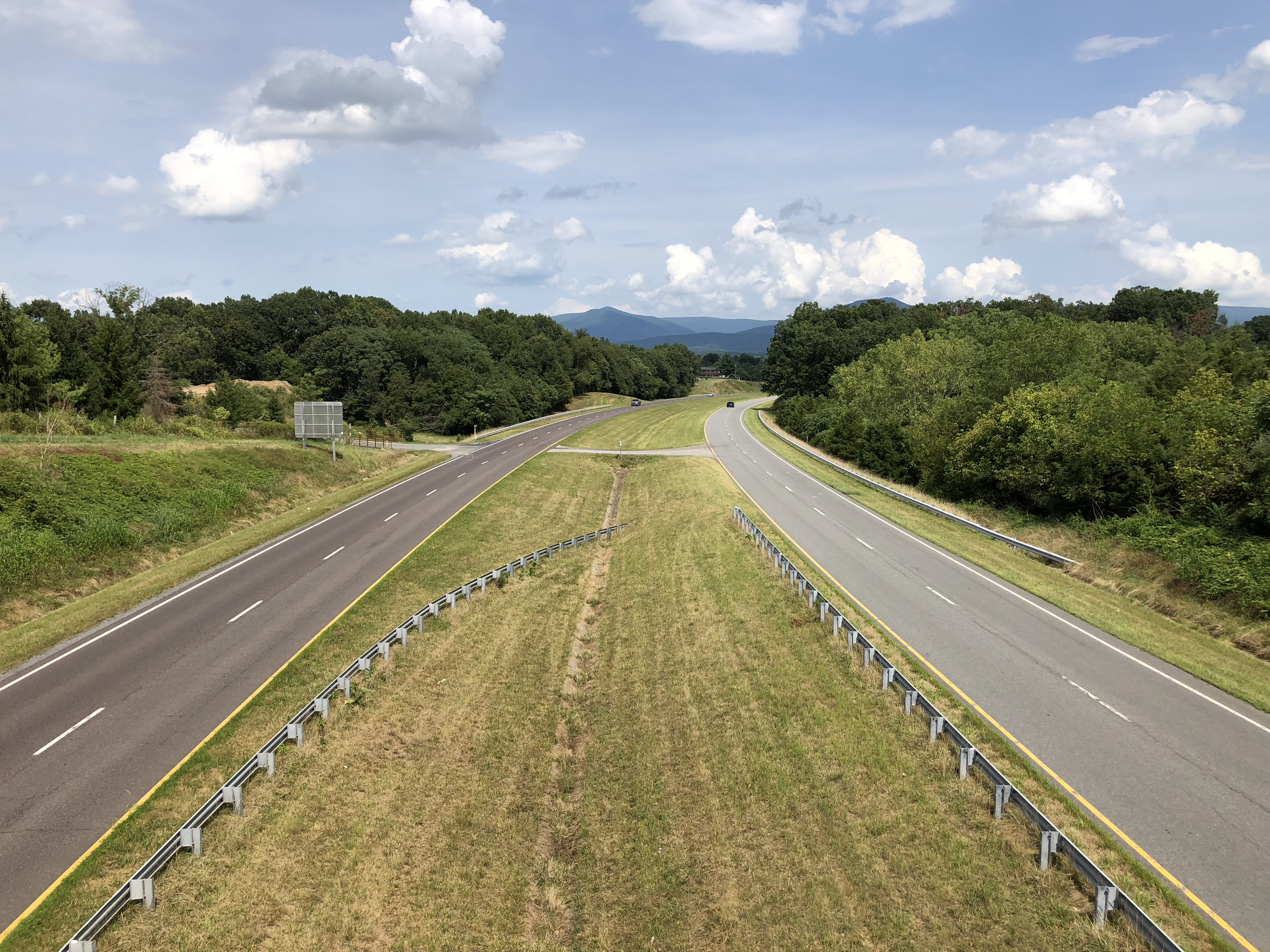
US 211 and US 340 run concurrently for several miles in Page County near Luray

- US 211
- US 340
- Skyline Drive

== Demographics ==
Historical population
Census	Pop.	Note	%±
1840	6,194		—
1850	7,600		22.7%
1860	8,109		6.7%
1870	8,462		4.4%
1880	9,965		17.8%
1890	13,092		31.4%
1900	13,794		5.4%
1910	14,147		2.6%
1920	14,770		4.4%
1930	14,852		0.6%
1940	14,863		0.1%
1950	15,152		1.9%
1960	15,572		2.8%
1970	16,581		6.5%
1980	19,401		17.0%
1990	21,690		11.8%
2000	23,177		6.9%
2010	24,042		3.7%
2020	23,709		−1.4%
2025 (est.)	23,762	▲	0.2%
U.S. Decennial Census; 1790–1960 1900–1990; 1990–2000 2010 2020

=== Racial and ethnic composition ===
Page County, Virginia – Racial and ethnic composition Note: the US Census treats Hispanic/Latino as an ethnic category. This table excludes Latinos from the racial categories and assigns them to a separate category. Hispanics/Latinos may be of any race.
Race / Ethnicity (NH = Non-Hispanic)	Pop 1980	Pop 1990	Pop 2000	Pop 2010	Pop 2020	% 1980	% 1990	% 2000	% 2010	% 2020
White alone (NH)	18,742	21,055	22,183	22,871	21,870	96.60%	97.07%	95.71%	95.13%	92.24%
Black or African American alone (NH)	491	439	501	456	436	2.53%	2.02%	2.16%	1.90%	1.84%
Native American or Alaska Native alone (NH)	10	21	32	37	49	0.05%	0.10%	0.14%	0.15%	0.21%
Asian alone (NH)	42	67	53	71	115	0.22%	0.31%	0.23%	0.30%	0.49%
Native Hawaiian or Pacific Islander alone (NH)	x	x	5	7	8	x	x	0.02%	0.03%	0.03%
Other race alone (NH)	6	2	11	6	40	0.03%	0.01%	0.05%	0.02%	0.17%
Mixed race or Multiracial (NH)	x	x	141	221	694	x	x	0.61%	0.92%	2.93%
Hispanic or Latino (any race)	110	106	251	373	497	0.57%	0.49%	1.08%	1.55%	2.10%
Total	19,401	21,690	23,177	24,042	23,709	100.00%	100.00%	100.00%	100.00%	100.00%

=== 2020 census ===
As of the 2020 census, the county had a population of 23,709. The median age was 46.4 years. 19.9% of residents were under the age of 18 and 22.7% of residents were 65 years of age or older. For every 100 females there were 98.5 males, and for every 100 females age 18 and over there were 97.4 males age 18 and over.

20.0% of residents lived in urban areas, while 80.0% lived in rural areas.

There were 9,866 households in the county, of which 26.1% had children under the age of 18 living with them and 25.3% had a female householder with no spouse or partner present. About 28.5% of all households were made up of individuals and 14.8% had someone living alone who was 65 years of age or older.

There were 11,751 housing units, of which 16.0% were vacant. Among occupied housing units, 71.8% were owner-occupied and 28.2% were renter-occupied. The homeowner vacancy rate was 1.5% and the rental vacancy rate was 6.6%.

=== 2000 Census ===
As of the census of 2000, there were 23,177 people, 9,305 households, and 6,634 families residing in the county. The population density was 74 people per square mile (29 people/km^{2}). There were 10,557 housing units at an average density of 34 units per square mile (13 units/km^{2}). The racial makeup of the county was 96.65% White, 2.61% Black or African American, 0.15% Native American, 0.24% Asian, 0.03% Pacific Islander, 0.48% from other races, and 0.68% from two or more races. 1.08% of the population were Hispanic or Latino of any race.

There were 9,305 households, out of which 29.60% had children under the age of 18 living with them, 55.80% were married couples living together, 10.50% had a female householder with no husband present, and 28.70% were non-families. 24.40% of all households were made up of individuals, and 11.10% had someone living alone who was 65 years of age or older. The average household size was 2.46 and the average family size was 2.91.

In the county, the population was spread out, with 23.00% under the age of 18, 7.70% from 18 to 24, 28.30% from 25 to 44, 25.30% from 45 to 64, and 15.70% who were 65 years of age or older. The median age was 39 years. For every 100 females there were 96.20 males. For every 100 females age 18 and over, there were 94.40 males.

The median income for a household in the county was $33,359, and the median income for a family was $39,005. Males had a median income of $27,199 versus $19,821 for females. The per capita income for the county was $16,321. About 10.10% of families and 12.50% of the population were below the poverty line, including 16.00% of those under age 18 and 14.70% of those age 65 or over.

== Communities ==

=== Towns ===
- Luray
- Shenandoah
- Stanley

=== Unincorporated communities ===
- Alma
- Battle Creek
- Blaineville
- Cavetown
- Comertown
- Compton
- Fleeburg
- Furnace
- Grove Hill
- Honeyville
- Ida
- Ingham
- Leaksville
- Marksville
- Mundellsville (former)
- Newport
- Overall
- Rileyville
- Stony Man

== Education ==
=== K-12 ===
Page County has a total of 8 public schools: 4 elementary schools, 2 middle schools and 2 high schools.

High Schools	Middle Schools	Elementary Schools
Luray	Luray	Luray
Luray	Luray	Springfield
Page County	Page County	Shenandoah
Page County	Page County	Stanley

In addition to the public schools, Page County has a Technical Center with programs in:

- Automotive Technology
- Cosmetology
- Electricity
- Welding
- Health Sciences

=== Higher education ===
Laurel Ridge Community College's Luray-Page County Center is located in Luray, which provides college and workforce development classes. Jenkins Hall features more than 13,000 square feet of educational space, including classrooms, science and health labs, a trades lab, student commons, and administrative offices.

The college in Luray is a satellite site for a physical therapy assistant degree program, plus phlebotomy, medical office assistant, HVAC, and heavy equipment operator classes.

Students can earn an Associate Degree in many different subjects, or can take general education classes to transfer into a four-year university.

== Politics ==
Since 1940, Page County has been a stronghold for the Republican Party in presidential elections.

The Page County Board of Supervisors has six members, one from each voting district and one at-large chairman.

County Board of Supervisors
Name	Party	District
Keith Weakley, Chairman	Rep	At-Large
D. Keith Guzy Jr.	Rep	District 1 - West Luray
Allen Louderback	Rep	District 2 - East Luray
Ryan Cubbage	Rep	District 3 - Marksville
Vacant	TBD	District 4 - Newport
Jeff Vaughan	Rep	District 5 - Shenandoah

United States presidential election results for Page County, Virginia
Year	Republican		Democratic		Third party(ies)	
Year	No.	%	No.	%	No.	%
1912	340	27.94%	703	57.76%	174	14.30%
1916	613	41.50%	842	57.01%	22	1.49%
1920	1,126	56.81%	846	42.68%	10	0.50%
1924	885	43.02%	1,015	49.34%	157	7.63%
1928	1,580	60.65%	1,025	39.35%	0	0.00%
1932	1,261	39.93%	1,851	58.61%	46	1.46%
1936	1,551	45.00%	1,888	54.77%	8	0.23%
1940	1,630	50.36%	1,596	49.30%	11	0.34%
1944	2,574	60.79%	1,653	39.04%	7	0.17%
1948	2,236	55.14%	1,611	39.73%	208	5.13%
1952	2,649	64.59%	1,441	35.14%	11	0.27%
1956	2,372	62.73%	1,358	35.92%	51	1.35%
1960	2,708	62.53%	1,608	37.13%	15	0.35%
1964	2,804	51.74%	2,606	48.09%	9	0.17%
1968	3,667	53.93%	2,125	31.25%	1,008	14.82%
1972	4,326	72.34%	1,585	26.51%	69	1.15%
1976	3,780	51.52%	3,401	46.35%	156	2.13%
1980	4,297	60.20%	2,607	36.52%	234	3.28%
1984	5,021	66.78%	2,437	32.41%	61	0.81%
1988	5,013	66.18%	2,499	32.99%	63	0.83%
1992	4,203	49.68%	3,010	35.58%	1,247	14.74%
1996	3,876	51.83%	2,868	38.35%	735	9.83%
2000	5,089	63.64%	2,726	34.09%	181	2.26%
2004	6,221	64.78%	3,324	34.61%	58	0.60%
2008	6,041	58.15%	4,235	40.76%	113	1.09%
2012	6,344	62.03%	3,724	36.41%	160	1.56%
2016	7,831	72.91%	2,514	23.41%	395	3.68%
2020	9,345	74.68%	3,007	24.03%	162	1.29%
2024	10,123	76.39%	2,976	22.46%	152	1.15%

== Notable people ==
- Arthur William Aleshire (February 15, 1900 – March 11, 1940) was a U.S. representative from Ohio.
- Edward Mallory "Ned" Almond (December 12, 1892 – June 11, 1979) was a controversial United States Army general best known as the commander of the Army's X Corps during the Korean War.
- Floyd Wilson Baker (October 10, 1916 – November 17, 2004) was a third baseman in Major League Baseball who played for the St. Louis Browns (1943–1944), Chicago White Sox (1945–1951), Washington Senators, (1952–1953), Boston Red Sox (1953–1954) and Philadelphia Phillies (1954–1955).
- William Randolph Barbee (January 17, 1818 – June 16, 1868) was an American sculptor recognized for creating idealized, sentimental classical figures.
- Herbert Barbee (October 8, 1848 – March 22, 1936) was an American sculptor.
- Peter Bouck Borst (June 23, 1826 – April 24, 1882) was an active participant in the mid-19th century development of Page County, Virginia, serving as a lawyer, county delegate to Virginia's Secession Convention of 1861, and president of the Shenandoah Valley Railroad.
- Patrick Henry Brittan (September 21, 1815 – March 18, 1868) was quartermaster general of Alabama (1857–59) and 10th Secretary of State for Alabama (1860–65).
- Wayne Comer (February 3, 1944 – October 4, 2023) is a former Major League Baseball player.
- Charles Frederick Crisp (January 29, 1845 – October 23, 1896) was a United States political figure. A Democrat, he was elected as a Congressman from Georgia in 1882, and served until his death in 1896. From 1890 until his death, he was leader of the Democratic Party in the House, as either the House Minority Leader or the Speaker of the House. He was also the father of Charles R. Crisp who also served in Congress.
- William Alexander Harris Sr. (August 24, 1805 – March 28, 1864) was a U.S. representative from Virginia, father of William A. Harris.
- William Alexander Harris (October 29, 1841 – December 20, 1909) was a United States representative and senator from Kansas.
- Benjamin Franklin Huffman (July 18, 1914 – February 22, 2005) was a catcher in Major League Baseball.
- Thomas Jordan (September 30, 1819 – November 27, 1895) was a Confederate general and major operative in the network of Confederate spies during the American Civil War. A West Point graduate and career soldier in the armies of three nations, he fought in numerous wars and rebellions in the United States, Mexico, and Cuba. Jordan was also a newspaper editor and author.
- Donald Edward Keyhoe (June 20, 1897 – November 29, 1988) was an American Marine Corps naval aviator, writer of many aviation articles and stories in a variety of leading publications, and manager of the promotional tours of aviation pioneers, especially of Charles Lindbergh.
- Robert Franklin Leedy (July 28, 1863 – January 12, 1924) was a lawyer, soldier, and Virginia state legislator.
- William Milnes Jr. (December 8, 1827 – August 14, 1889) was a nineteenth-century congressman and industrialist from Virginia and Pennsylvania.
- Kenneth R. Plum (born November 3, 1941) is a member of the Virginia House of Delegates.
- George Quaintance (June 3, 1902 – November 8, 1957) was an artist from Page County, Virginia.
- Henry Ruffner (January 16, 1790 – December 17, 1861) was an educator and Presbyterian minister, who served as president of Washington College (now Washington and Lee University).
- Bethany Veney (c. 1813 – November 16, 1916), also known as Aunt Betty, was a Black American slave. Her autobiography was published 1889.
- William Overall Yager (April 3, 1833 – 1904) was, during the American Civil War, the commanding officer of the 1st Texas Cavalry, and, in postwar years, member of the Virginia House of Delegates and the Senate of Virginia, Superintendent of Schools, and Treasurer for Page County, Virginia.

== See also ==
- National Register of Historic Places listings in Page County, Virginia
- USS Page County (LST-1076)
