= Heidar =

Heidar is a name, chiefly in Arabic, with variant spellings such as Haydar, Haider, and Heydar. It may refer to:

== Given name ==
- Haidar al-Abbadi, Iraqi prime minister
- Haidar Ali (c. 1722 – 1782), ruler of the Indian Kingdom of Mysore
- Heidar Aliev (1923–2003), third President of Azerbaijan for the New Azerbaijan Party from October 1993 to October 2003
- Haidar Abdel-Shafi (1919–2007), Palestinian physician and community leader
- Haidar Abdul-Amir (born 1982), Iraqi football player
- Haidar Abdul-Jabar (born 1976), Iraqi football player
- Haidar Abdul-Razzaq (born 1982), Iraqi football player
- Haïdar el Ali, Senegalese ecologist and government minister
- Haidar Abu Bakr al-Attas (1939–), Prime Minister of Yemen
- Heidar Arfaa (1919–1976), Conseiller d'État to Shah Mohammad Reza Pahlavi of Iran
- Haidar Bagir, Indonesian philosopher, entrepreneur, social activist
- Haidar Khan (died c. 1925), leader of one of the Bakhtiari tribes in Iran
- Haidar Mahmoud (born 1973), Iraqi football player
- Haidar Malik (1620s), administrator, and soldier in Kashmir
- Heidar Moslehi (born 1957), Iranian cleric and politician who served as the minister of intelligence from 2009 to 2013
- Haidar Nasir (born 1981), also known as Haider Jabreen, Iraqi discus thrower
- Haidar Obeid (born 1997), Lebanese Roboticist
- Haidar Qassāb (died 1356), head of the Sarbadars of Sabzewar from 1355/56 until his death
- Haidar Sabah (born 1986), Iraqi football player
- Haidar Salim, Afghan singer
- Haidar Al-Shaïbani (born 1984), Algerian-Canadian football (soccer) player

== Middle name ==
- Khwaja Haidar Ali Aatish (1778–1848), Urdu poet
- Maya Haïdar Boustani, Lebanese archaeologist and museum curator
- Mirza Muhammad Haidar Dughlat (1499 or 1500–1551), Chagatai Turko-Mongol military general, ruler of Kashmir

== Surname ==
- Adnan Haidar (born 1989), Norway-born Lebanese football player
- Ali Haidar (basketball) (born 1990), Canadian basketball player of Lebanese origin
- Ali Haidar (military) (1913–1999), Pakistani Pashtun military personality in British Indian Army
- Ali Haidar (politician) (born 1962), Syrian politician and minister
- Aminatou Heidar (born 1966), Sahrawi human rights activist and an advocate of the independence of Western Sahara
- Celine Haidar (born c. 2005), Lebanese footballer
- Dana Haidar (born 1993), Jordanian taekwondo player
- Ensaf Haidar, Indian Human rights activist
- Gul Haidar, former mujahideen commander and official in the Afghan Ministry of Defense
- Haidar Haidar, Syrian writer and novelist
- Knut Heidar (born 1949), Norwegian political scientist
- Mohamad Haidar (born 1989), Lebanese football player

== See also ==
- Haydar, for other spelling variants of the Arabic name
- Haider (given name), a South Asian and Arabic given name
- Haider (surname), a South Asian, Arabic, and German surname
- Heider (surname), a German surname
- Darreh Heidar, a village in Khomeh Rural District, in the Central District of Aligudarz County, Lorestan Province, Iran
- Ghaleh Ghaed Heidar, a village in Hayat Davud Rural District, in the Central District of Ganaveh County, Bushehr Province, Iran
- Heidar Abad Roodbar, a village in Rudbar Rural District, in the Central District of Rudbar-e Jonubi County, Kerman Province, Iran
- Heidari, an Iranian surname
