= Haydar (disambiguation) =

Haydar, Haidar, and other variant spellings, are Arabic names. It may also refer to:

== Places ==
- Haidar, a village in Casimcea Commune, Tulcea County, Romania
- Haidar Usmonov, town and jamoat in north-west Tajikistan
- Haydar, Akyurt, village in the District of Akyurt, Ankara Province, Turkey

== Other uses ==
- "Haydar Haydar", a traditional Alevi song

== See also ==
- Hyder (disambiguation)
- Heydari (disambiguation)
- Hyder (name)
- Hyderi (name)
- Haider, a name
- Haider (film), 2014 Indian film by Vishal Bhardwaj, adaptation of Shakespeare's Hamlet
  - Haider (soundtrack), soundtrack album by Vishal Bhardwaj for the 2014 film
- Hyderi, a neighbourhood in Karachi, Pakistan
- Haidari, a suburb of Athens, Greece
- Babaheydar, also Romanized as Bābā Ḩeydar or Bāba Haīdar, city in Iran
- Haydarpaşa, neighborhood within the Kadıköy district on the Asian part of Istanbul, Turkey
- Nishan-e-Haider, the highest military decoration given by Pakistan
