= Haider (given name) =

Name list

Haider is a South Asian and Arabic given name.

== Notable people ==
=== First name ===
- Haider Al-Abadi (born 1952), Iraqi politician
- Haider Ackermann (born 1971), French fashion designer
- Haider Ali (disambiguation), multiple people
- Haider Aziz Safwi (1945–2018), Indian politician
- Haider Hussain (field hockey) (born 1979), Pakistani field hockey player
- Hyder Husyn (born 1963), Bangladeshi singer-songwriter
- Haider Jabreen (born 1981), Iraqi discus thrower, also known as Haidar Nasir (born 1981)
- Haider Mahmoud (born 1942), Jordanian-Palestinian poet
- Haider Nawzad (born 1983), Iraqi rower, also known as Haydar Nozad, Haidar Hama Rashid
- Haider Qureshi (born 1953), Pakistani Urdu poet, writer and journalist
- Haider Rahman, Pakistani musician
- Haider Rameez (born 1988), Pakistani cricketer
- Haider Raza (1916–1998), Pakistani Air Force chief of staff
- Haider Shah (died 1472), 15th-century sultan of Kashmir
- Haider Zaman Khan (1934–2018), Pakistani politician and administrator

=== Middle name ===
- Abdulelah Haider Shaye (born c. 1977), Yemeni journalist, also known as Abd al-Ilah Haydar Al-Sha'i
- Ali Haider Gillani, Pakistani politician
- Ali Haider Khan (1896–1963), Bengali noble and politician
- Ali Haider Multani (1690–1785), Sufi Punjabi poet
- Ali Haider Noor Khan Niazi (born 1978), Pakistani politician
- Ali Haider Shah (born 2003), Danish professional footballer
- Ali Haider Tabatabai (1854–1933), Indian poet, translator, and scholar
- Ali Haider Zaidi (born 1952), Pakistani politician
- Badrul Haider Chowdhury (1925–1998), chief justice of Bangladesh
- Dada Amir Haider Khan (1900–1989), Pakistani communist activist and revolutionary
- Ghulam Haider Hamidi (1945–2011), Afghan politician
- Ghulam Haider Wyne (1940–1993), Pakistani politician
- Ijlal Haider Zaidi (1929–2013), Pakistani civil servant and politician
- Inam Haider Malik, Pakistani general
- Khaqan Haider Ghazi (born 1965), Punjabi poet
- Lutful Haider Chowdhury, Bangladeshi essayist, researcher, educationist, and intellectual
- Mufazzal Haider Chaudhury (1926–1971), Bengali essayist, scholar and educator
- Nawab Haider Naqvi (1935–2024), Pakistani economist and scholar
- Rafique Haider Khan Leghari (born 1951), Pakistani politician
- Raja Farooq Haider Khan (born 1955), Kashmiri politician
- Razzaqul Haider Chowdhury, Pakistani politician
- Saqib Haider Karbalai (1993–2017), Pakistani Pashtun militant
- Shamim Haider Patwary (born 1981), Bangladeshi politician, lawyer, and academic
- Shamsul Haider Siddique, Bangladeshi colonel
- Shish Haider Chowdhury, Bangladeshi politician
- Sidi Muhammad Haider Khan (1909–1970), Nawab of Sachin State
- Syed Haider Ali (1933–2013), Bangladeshi politician, businessman, and independence activist
- Zeeshan Haider Jawadi (1938–2000), Indian scholar, religious leader, poet, historian, and philosopher
- Zia Haider Rahman, British novelist and broadcaster

== See also ==
- Haider (disambiguation)
- Haider (surname)
- Hyder (name)
- Heydari (name)
- Heidar
- Haydar
- Heydar
