= Haider =

Haider may refer to the following:

== People ==
- Haider (given name)
- Haider (surname)

== Other uses ==
- Haider (film), 2014 Indian Hindi-language film
  - Haider (soundtrack), soundtrack of the film
- Haider (tank), third-generation Pakistani main battle tank
- Nishan-e-Haider, highest military gallantry award in Pakistan
- Shaheed Haider Ali railway station, railway station in Walhar village, Punjab, Pakistan

== See also ==
- Aidar (disambiguation)
- Aydar (disambiguation)
- Gaidar (disambiguation)
- Haidar
- Hajder
- Heidar
- Heider (disambiguation)
- Haydar
- Heydar
- Hyder (disambiguation)
- Hyderi
- Hyderi (name)
- Heydari (disambiguation)
