= Gaidar =

Gaidar may refer to:

== People ==
- Gaidar (surname), a Russian surname
- A spelling variant of an Arabic name (Arabic حيدر ), another form of (حيدرة), see Haydar.
- A spelling variant of an Azerbaijani given name Heydər, Гейдар taken from Arabic, now more commonly transliterated as Heydar

== Places ==
- Gaidar, Iran, a village in Iran
- Gaidar, Gagauzia, a commune and village in Gagauzia, Moldova
- Gaidar, a former name of Novoalexandrovka village, Rovensky District, Belgorod Oblast, Russia
- Gaidar, a former name of Qaraqol village, Atbasar District, Akmola Region, Kazakhstan

== See also ==
- Gaydar (disambiguation)
