= Haider (surname) =

Name list

Haider is a South Asian, Arabic, and German surname. The German surname is a variant of Heider, and may be a habitation name for someone living on a heath, or a reference to a place-name with similar meanings.

== Arabic-derived ==
- Adil Haider (born 1973), Pakistani-American trauma surgeon
- Afzaal Haider (born 1971), Pakistani-born Hongkonger cricketer
- Ali Haider (cricketer) (born 1988), Pakistani cricketer
- Ali Haider, Pakistani singer and actor
- Daud Haider (1952–2025), Bangladeshi poet
- Farooq Haider Khan (born 1955), 12th Prime Minister of Azad Jammu and Kashmir
- Ghazi-ud-Din Haider (born c. 1769 – 1827), last nawab wazir of Oudh (1814–1818) and first King of Oudh (1818–1827)
- Ghulam Haider, music composer well known in both India and Pakistan
- Iqbal Haider (1945–2012), advocate of the Supreme Court of Pakistan, co-chair of the Human Rights Commission of Pakistan
- Izhar Haider (1944–2009), Urdu poet, social worker, and broadcaster
- Jalila Haider (born 1988), human rights attorney and political activist
- Moinuddin Haider (born 1942), Pakistani general
- Mohsin Abbas Haider, Pakistani singer, actor, writer and TV presenter
- Nasiruddin Haider (born c. 1803 – 1837), second King of Oudh (1827–1837)
- Rashid Haider (1941–2020), Bangladeshi author and novelist
- Sajad Haider (1932–2025), Pakistani fighter pilot
- Sajjad Haider (born 1966), Indian journalist media personality
- Sara Haider, Pakistani singer-songwriter and actress
- Sarah Haider (born 1991), Pakistani-American writer
- Sayed Haider (1925–2020), Bangladeshi physician and Language Movement activist
- Shuja Haider (born 1982), Pakistani singer, songwriter, composer, music director and record producer
- Syed Afzal Haider (1931–2022), Pakistani politician
- Wasim Haider (born 1967), Pakistani cricketer
- Zameer Haider (born 1962), Pakistani international cricket umpire
- Zulqarnain Haider (cricketer) (born 1986), Pakistani cricketer

== German-derived ==
- Andreas Haider-Maurer (born 1987), Austrian tennis player
- Celina Haider (born 2000), German ice-hockey player
- Eduard Haider, Austrian slalom canoeist
- Engelbert Haider (1922–1999), Austrian alpine skier
- Ernst Haider (1890–1988), German painter
- Ilse Haider (born 1965), Austrian artist
- Joe Haider (born 1936), German pianist and jazz educator
- Jörg Haider (1950–2008), Austrian politician
- Karl Michael Haider (1846–1912), German painter
- Markus Haider (born 1974), Austrian singer
- Maximilian Haider (born 1950), Austrian physicist
- Michael Lawrence Haider (1904–1986), American petroleum executive
- Roman Haider (born 1967), Austrian politician
- Sepp Haider (born 1953), Austrian rally driver

== See also ==
- Haider (disambiguation)
- Haider (given name)
- Heider (surname)
- Gaidar (surname)
- Hydari (surname)
- Hyder (name)
- Heydari (name)
- Haydar
- Hajder
