= Heydari =

Heydari (Persian: حیدری) may refer to:

== Places in Iran ==
- Heydari, Bushehr, Bushehr Province
- Heydari, Tangestan, Bushehr Province
- Heydari, Chaharmahal and Bakhtiari
- Heydari, Fars
- Heydari, Hormozgan
- Bursar Heydari, a village in Sistan and Baluchestan province

== Other uses ==
- Heydari (surname), an Iranian surname
- Hydari (name), variant of the above

== See also ==
- Heydar, an Iranian male given name
- Hyder (disambiguation)
- Haydar (disambiguation)
- Hyderi, a neighbourhood in Karachi, Pakistan
