= Gaydar (disambiguation) =

Gaydar is the supposed ability to identify gay people.

Gaydar may also refer to:

- Gaydar (website), a gay dating website
- Gaydar (film), a 2002 comedy short film
- Gaydar Radio, a British radio station
- "Gaydar", the 14th episode of The New Normal
- "Gaydar", an online quiz show hosted by drag performer Anania Williams
- A spelling variant of the names Heydar and Gaidar

== See also ==
- Geydar (disambiguation)
