= Brave =

Brave(s) or The Brave(s) may refer to:

== Common meanings ==
- Brave, an adjective for one who possesses courage
- Braves (Native Americans), a Euro-American stereotype for Native American warriors

== Film and television ==
- Brave (1994 film), a concept film based on the Marillion album
- The Brave (film), 1997, starring Johnny Depp
- Brave, a 2007 Thai film featuring Afdlin Shauki
- Brave (2012 film), an animated film produced by Pixar and released by Disney
- Brave (2014 film), a Nigerian short film
- Brave: Gunjō Senki, a 2021 live-action film adaptation of manga Gunjō Senki
- The Brave (TV series), an American television series
- "Brave", TV series episode of The Walking Dead: World Beyond
- "Brave" (Jurassic World Camp Cretaceous), an episode of Jurassic World Camp Cretaceous
- Brave Animated Series, a 2021 Taiwanese animated series

== Literature ==
- Brave (graphic novel), a 2017 children's book by Svetlana Chmakova
- Brave (McGowan book), a 2018 memoir by Rose McGowan
- The Brave, a 2010 novel by Nicholas Evans
- The Brave, a novel by Gregory Mcdonald and the basis for the 1997 film

== Music ==
=== Labels ===
- Brave Entertainment, a South Korean record label

=== Groups ===
- The Brave (band), an Australian metalcore band

=== Albums ===
- Brave (A-Mei album), 2003
- Brave (Beau Dermott album) or its title song
- Brave (Joyryde album)
- Brave (Jennifer Lopez album) or its title song
- Brave (Jamie O'Neal album) or its title song
- Brave (Kate Ceberano album) or its title song
- Brave (Shawn McDonald album)
- Brave (Marillion album) or its title song
- Brave (Nichole Nordeman album) or its title song
- Brave (Moriah Peters album) or its title song
- Brave (The Shires album) or its title song
- Brave (soundtrack), from the 2012 film

=== Songs ===
- "Brave" (Arashi song)
- "Brave" (Sara Bareilles song)
- "Brave" (Hanna Ferm song)
- "Brave" (Josh Groban song)
- "Brave" (Ella Henderson song)
- "Brave" (Kelis song)
- "Brave" (Idina Menzel song)
- "The Brave" (Yoasobi song)
- "Brave", by Action Item
- "The Brave", by Believer from Gabriel
- "Brave", by Jessie J with Don Diablo
- "Brave", by Katatonia from Brave Murder Day
- "Brave", by Leona Lewis from Echo
- "Brave", by Twice from Between 1&2

== Places ==
- Brave, Pennsylvania, US, an unincorporated community and census-designated place
- Brave Mountain, Labrador, Canada

== Ships ==
- HMS Brave, various Royal Navy ships
- Brave-class patrol boat, comprising two motor torpedo boats of the Royal Navy Coastal Forces division
- French ship Brave, various French Navy ships
- HMS Arab (1798), a post ship originally the French privateer Brave

== Sports teams ==
=== American and Canadian football ===
- Burlington Braves, a junior football league team based in Ontario, Canada
- Syracuse Braves, an American professional football team in 1936 and 1937
- Boston Braves (NFL), the original name in 1932 of the National Football League team that became the Redskins

=== Baseball ===
- Atlanta Braves, an American Major League Baseball team (originally the Boston Braves, then the Milwaukee Braves), or their affiliates:
  - Anderson Braves, a former affiliate
  - Austin Braves, a former affiliate of the Milwaukee and Atlanta Braves
  - Danville Braves, a farm team
  - Dominican Summer League Braves
  - Evansville Braves, minor league team affiliated with the Boston and Milwaukee Braves in the 1940s and 1950s
  - Greenwood Braves, a former affiliate
  - Gulf Coast League Braves
  - Gwinnett Braves, a Triple-A affiliate previously the Richmond Braves (see below)
  - Jacksonville Braves, a former Class A affiliate of the Milwaukee Braves
  - Kingsport Braves, a former affiliate
  - Macon Braves, a Class A affiliate now the Rome Braves (see below)
  - Mississippi Braves, former name of Double-AA affiliate Columbus Clingstones
  - Richmond Braves, a defunct Triple-A affiliate
  - Rome Braves, former name of Class A affiliate Rome Emperors
  - Savannah Braves, a former affiliate
  - Sumter Braves, a former affiliate
  - Utica Braves, a former affiliate of the Boston Braves and other teams
  - Ventura Braves, a former affiliate of the Boston Braves
  - Waycross Braves, a former affiliate of the Milwaukee Braves
  - Wichita Braves, a former Class AAA affiliate of the Milwaukee Braves
- Bourne Braves, a collegiate summer baseball team in Massachusetts
- Kilgore Braves, an East Texas League baseball team in 1936
- Orix BlueWave, formerly the Hankyu Braves and Orix Braves, a defunct Japanese professional baseball team
- Salisbury Braves, a defunct affiliate of the Houston Colt .45s in 1961 and the New York Mets in 1962
- Staunton Braves, a collegiate summer baseball team in Virginia

=== Basketball ===
- Bendigo Braves, in the Australian Basketball Association
- Buffalo Braves, a National Basketball Association team now the Los Angeles Clippers
- Elizabeth Braves, a 1940s American Basketball League team

=== Cricket ===
- Northern Brave, a New Zealand women's cricket team that plays in the New Zealand Women's Super Smash
- Southern Brave, an English cricket team that plays in the Hundred

=== Ice hockey ===
- Boston Braves (AHL), a former American Hockey League team
- Brockville Braves, a Junior "A" hockey team from Ontario, Canada
- Saanich Braves, a Junior "B" hockey team in British Columbia, Canada
- Spokane Braves, a Junior "B" hockey team in Washington state
- St. Louis Braves, a former affiliate of the National Hockey League Chicago Black Hawks
- Tavistock Braves, a Junior "C" hockey team from Ontario
- Valleyfield Braves (2014), a Junior "AAA" hockey team from Quebec, Canada
- Valleyfield Braves (defunct), a former Junior "AAA" hockey team from Quebec, Canada

=== University teams ===
- Braves, the athletics teams of the University of North Carolina at Pembroke
- Bradley Braves, the athletics teams of Bradley University, Illinois
- Ottawa Braves, the athletics teams of Ottawa University, Kansas

=== Other sports teams ===
- Boston Braves (rugby league), an American National Rugby League team
- Braves (Super Fours), a women's cricket team that competed in the Super Fours
- Indianapolis Braves, an American soccer team
- Kitchener-Waterloo Braves, a Junior "A" box lacrosse team from Ontario, Canada

== Video games ==
- Brave (2012 video game), a game based on the 2012 film
- Brave: A Warrior's Tale, a 2009 port of the 2005 platform game for Xbox 360 and Wii
- Brave: Shaman's Challenge, a 2009 puzzle game for Nintendo DS
- Brave: The Search for Spirit Dancer, a 2005 platform game for PlayStation 2
- Temple Run: Brave, a 2012 endless runner for iOS, Android, and Windows Phones

== Other uses ==
- Brave (web browser), a free and open-source web browser based on Chromium
- Brave Search, search engine
- Brave series (勇者シリーズ), a robot toy and anime franchise
- Kansu Braves, an army division of Chinese Muslims from Kansu that fought in the Boxer Rebellion
- Ysabella Brave (born 1979), American YouTube personality and singer

== See also ==
- List of people known as the Brave
