= Geidar =

Geidar is a possible transliteration for:

- Haydar, an Arabic name (Arabic حيدر )
- Heydar, an Azerbaijani given name (Azerbaijani Heydər, Гейдар)
