= Geydar =

Geydar may refer to:

- Qidar, city in Iran
- Geydar Dzhemal (1947–2016), Islamic revolutionary

== See also ==
- Gaidar
- Gaydar
- Heydar
- Haydar
