= Heitler =

Heitler is a surname, and may refer to:

- Mike Heitler, prohibition gangster
- Walter (Heinrich) Heitler, German-born physicist who made contributions to quantum electrodynamics and quantum field theory, to the theory of phase transitions, and - with Fritz London - to chemical bonding in hydrogen-like molecules.

== See also ==
- Heidler
