= Hyder =

Hyder may refer to:

== Places ==
- Hyder, Alaska, U.S.
  - Hyder Seaplane Base
- Hyder, Arizona, U.S.
  - Hyder Valley
- Hyder Creek, is a river in New York, U.S.

== Other uses ==
- Hyder (defunct company), a former Welsh utility company
  - Hyder Consulting, a subsidiary company, an advisory and design consultancy
- Hyder (name)

== See also ==
- Haydar (disambiguation)
- Heydari (disambiguation)
- Haider (surname)
- Hyderi (name)
- Ghulam Hyder Siyal, village in Sindh, Pakistan
- Hyderabad, a city in Telangana, India
