= Kamal Haider =

Kamal Haider may refer to:

- Kamal Haydar, short story writer from southern Yemen
- Kamal Haider (politician), Bangladeshi politician
