= Derow =

Derow may refer to:

- Peter Derow (1944-2006), American academic
- Derow, Iran, a village in Ardabil Province, Iran
- Derow, Bushehr, a village in Bushehr Province, Iran
