= Heydari (surname) =

Heydari (Persian: حیدری) is an Iranian surname and given name. Transliteration variants include Heydary, Heidari, Haydary, Haydari, Heidary. The meaning of Heydari comes from an epithet for "lion" (Haydar) in Arabic. A surname of similar origin, known in the Indian subcontinent, Hyderi/Hydari, is derived from a similar given name Hyder. Notable people with the name include:

== Surname ==
- Ahmad Ali Heydari (born 1963), Iranian philosopher
- Andre Heidari (born 1993), American football placekicker
- Ali Akbar Heidari (born 1941), Iranian wrestler
- Alireza Heidari (born 1976), Iranian wrestler
- Alireza Heidari (footballer) (born 1992), Iranian footballer
- Alison Heydari (fl. 2000), British police officer
- Fatemeh Heidari (born 1996), Iranian Wushu practitioner
- Gholamreza Heydari (born c. 1955), Iranian engineer and academic
- Hadi Heidari (fl. 2009), Iranian cartoonist
- Hamed Heidari (born 1991), Iranian Paralympic athlete
- Hashem Heydari (born 1966), Iranian footballer
- Hossein Heydari (born 1998), Iranian footballer
- Ibrahim Haydari (1936–2024), Iraqi sociologist
- Iman Heydari (born 1983), Iranian footballer
- Kamal al-Haydari (born 1956), Iraqi Philosopher
- Kamran Heidari (born 1979), Iranian documentary filmmaker, photographer, and writer
- Khosro Heydari (born 1983), Iranian footballer
- Kioumars Heydari (born 1964), Iranian soldier
- Majid Heidari (born 1982), Iranian footballer
- Mobina Heidari (fl. 2018), Iranian karateka
- Mohammad Heidari (born 1986), Iranian footballer
- Mohammad Heydari (1937–2016), Iranian musician
- Mohammad Reza Heydari (born 1966), Iranian consul
- Morteza Heidari (born 1968), Iranian TV presenter
- Mostafa Heydari (born 1991), Iranian volleyball player
- Nima Heidari (born 1985), Iranian hockey player
- Omran Haydary, (born 1998), Afghan footballer
- Payam Heydari (fl. 1992), Iranian-American professor
- Reza Heydari (born 1991), Iranian footballer
- Sepehr Heydari (born 1980), Iranian footballer
- Shadieh Heydari (born 1967), Swedish politician

== Given name ==
- Haydari Tabrizi (died 1592/1594), poet in Safavid Iran and the Mughal Empire
- Abdul Rahman Heidari Ilami (1925–1987), Iranian ayatollah
- Mohsen Heidari Alekasir (born 1957), Iranian ayatollah

== See also ==
- Haydari and Ne'mati, historical rival Iranian factions
