= Hai (surname) =

Hai (Chinese: 海; pinyin: Hǎi) is a Chinese surname meaning "ocean." According to a 2013 study, it was the 293rd most common surname, being shared by 197,000 people or 0.015% of the population, with the province with the most people being Ningxia. In some instances, like with the Ming official Hai Rui, the name originated as a Sinicization of the Arabic name "Haydar".

== People ==
- Hai Rui (海瑞; Hai Jui; 1514–1587) Chinese scholar-official and politician during the Ming dynasty
- Hai Xia (born 1972), news anchor for China Central Television
- Hai Qing (Chinese: 海清; born 1978), Chinese film and television actress
- Ocean Hai (Chinese: 海鸣威; born 1982), Chinese musical artist
- Hai Rui (basketball) (海瑞; born 1985), Chinese professional basketball player

== See also ==
- Mar (surname)
