= Mohammad Bahmanbeigi =

Iranian activist 1920–2010

- محمد بهمن‌بیگی
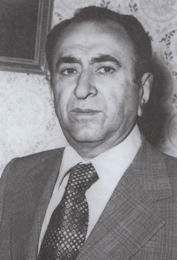
- Born: 16 February 1920; Firuzabad, Fars, Sublime State of Iran
- Died: 1 May 2010 (aged 90); Shiraz, Iran
- Education: Dar ul-Funun; University of Tehran
- Occupations: Teacher; writer; jurist
- Years active: 1947–2010
- Known for: Establishing education for nomadic communities in Iran
- Spouses: Gohar Gorginpour (divorced); Sakineh Kiani
- Children: 7
- Parent: Mahmoud (father)
- Website: http://www.bahmanbeigi.ir/

Mohammad Bahmanbeigi (Persian: محمد بهمن‌بیگی; 16 February 1920 – 1 May 2010), sometimes rendered Mohammad Bahman Beigi, was an activist of education for nomadic communities in Iran.

== Early life ==
Bahmanbeigi was born into the Iranian Qashqai tribe in the southern Fars province. His family headed a small clan, so Bahmanbeigi was educated, attending university in Tehran.

== Working with the American Point Four Program ==
On 28 October 1954, Bahmanbeigi was chief of tribal education of the American Point Four Program in Shiraz, Iran. According to the confidential classified documents of the embassy of the United States in Tehran, Robert L. Funseth, American Vice Consul in Tabriz, reported to Bryant Buckingham American Consul in Isfahan: "While discussing informally and unofficially the general subject of the tribes with Mr. Bahmanbeigi, chief of tribal education program of Point Four in Shiraz, I learned that Khosro Khan had visited General Azizi on Sunday, October 24 (1954). According to Bahmanbeigi, Khosro Khan is presently living at Firuzabad".

In October 1954 Funseth introduced Bahmanbeigi as: director of the Point Four tribal education program. According to his report: "Background on Bahmanbeigi: about 40 years old. Is a member of the Amaleh tribe. His father is in the mountains with his sub-tribe. Bahmanbeigi is a graduate of the University of Tehran Law School. He directs the Point Four tribal education program".

Also, Mr Funseth wrote: "Bahmanbeigi visited the United States in 1952 for six months on a private visit. This trip was mostly financed by Khosro Khan. He speaks good English. He told me that because he opposed Khosro in his abortive act of last year (1953) he has lost favor with him. He implied that he was active in forming an opposition to the Khan’s acts".

According to Clarence Hendershot, a frequent visitor to the schools as the American Education Director in Iran from 1961 through 1965, the tent schools program proved the most successful primary education project that Point Four engaged in Iran; it functioned exactly as a low modernization technical assistance project should. Gagon provided crucial help with gathering important demographic data, procuring supplies and training teachers during the first two years of the program before the Ministry of Education offered its support.

The Americans also shaped the teaching methods to some degree, though many of Bahmanbegi's ideas resulted at least as much from his own trips to the United States. The program itself, however, was almost exclusively Iranian in execution. Iranians taught and maintained the schools with Bahmanbegi firmly in charge. American influence declined rapidly after the Iranian Ministry of Education assumed financial responsibility for the program in 1955, and Bahmanbegi left the Point Four payroll.

== The Point Four and tribal education ==
"The modern Iranian state during the 1930s convinced the Qashqai leadership of the importance of being able to function in an increasingly sophisticated society. Consequently, the idea of educating their children gained popularity among the Qashqai by the 1950s." "In 1950, the first Point Four international agreement has been signed for American technical cooperation in Iran." In the same year, "Brigham Young University-BYU was invited to participate in Point Four Program in Iran. The United States government also sought the aid of the University of Utah and Utah State Agricultural College [now Utah State University] in planning, staffing and operating the program."

"BYU sent four groups of educators to assist in correcting the weaknesses of Iranian school system. The initial group of six educators from BYU including Mr. Glen Gagon, sent in 1951, assisted in upgrading elementary education, establishing tribal schools, and getting the Point Four Program in operation." "Glen Gagon relocated to Shiraz and was involved in founding Point Four nomadic schools for nomadic communities since 1951. The program was later extended to other nomadic regions of Iran."

Vincent Buist (December 1954, Reuters) has prepared a report about the Point for in Iran and published it in Toledo Blade newspaper. He wrote: The first American move to establish tribal education was made by Glen Gagon of Provo, Utah, in 1953. He did a survey of the needs of the nomads. Mr. Gagon found in 1953 that no schools existed for poorer nomads. He went directly to the tribal chiefs. "The chiefs in the main were receptive", he says. "They helped in electing the best qualified men to serve as teachers and sent them to teachers' training courses, and promised to pay their salaries". Mr. Gagon did his early work by jeep and horseback, often spending 10 days at a time in the saddle among tribes moving through the wild Zagros mountain range. He soon learned that secondary schoolboys from the towns would not make good tribal teachers. "Tribal teachers must be known to the families they are going to teach. They must be accepted, from the khan downward, and they must want to stay with the tribes and take a full part in nomadic life. A town boy, however good, would not be accepted", Mr. Gagon said.

Until the early 1950s, tribal folk entrusted the education of their children to mullahs, or tribal elders, who had passed the age of usefulness at hunting or working with cattle. Iranian authorities hoped that education will prove a useful preliminary to inducing the tribes to settle, cultivate the land, prosper and pay taxes as other citizens do.

"Glen Gagon, a Point Four advisor and graduate student of Max Berryessa at BYU, assisted in the tent school program almost from its inception. The Point Four staff assigned Gagon to work in Fars. They began designing a tent school program for all the Qashqai as well as for the neighboring Basseri tribes. The Point Four role was mostly logistical – it helped with supplies and the training of teachers; Bahmanbeigi supervised the schools and conducted the student examinations.Gagon provided crucial help with gathering important demographic data, procuring supplies and training teachers during the first two years of the program before the Ministry of Education offered its support.The Americans also shaped the teaching methods to some degree, though many of Bahmanbegi’s ideas resulted at least as much from his own trips to the United States." "In that time, Mr. Bahmanbeigi was placed on the Point Four payroll."

"The tribal normal school first admitted girls in 1962; eleven years later 270 had graduated and were teaching, a significant accomplishment given the hesitancy with which some Qashqai greeted the idea of sending their girls to school just a decade earlier." The tent school program increased educational opportunities for tribal girls, a goal of both the BYU advisors and the Iranian Ministry of Education.

== Qashqai tribal education and Bahmanbeigi ==
Based on the confidential classified documents of the embassy of the United States in Tehran, "Bahmanbeigi is a member of Amaleh tribe, and he directs the Point Four tribal education program. He visited the United States in 1952 for six months on a private visit". "Bahmanbegi was abundantly qualified to lead the experiment in education. His father had served on the staff of the Qashqai’s leading khan, and Bahmanbegi himself took a law degree from the University of Tehran."

"From the end of World War II to the fall of Iranian nationalist Prime Minister Mohammad Mosaddeq (in office 1951-53), the Qashqai tribal confederation lived its heyday. The loose control of central government over the Qashqai and later a relationship of mutual support between Mosaddeq and the Qashqai enabled them to flourish both socio-politically and territorially. But the days of the Qashqai tribal confederation as an important political unit were short: in 1953, Pahlavi King toppled Mosaddeq’s government in a coup backed by the CIA, abolished the title of ilkhan and sent the main Qashqai leaders into exile. The King pursued his father’s policy of "settlement of nomads" (forced sedentarization) using new tactics, such as the replacement of the traditional Qashqai khans by Iranian Army officers. Later, he completed the process by imposing the Edare-ye Amuzesh-e 'Ašāyer ("the office of tribal education"), a Persian-based schooling system. This system educated tribes children in white tents which were set to make transhumance accompanying the pastoralist tribes. It was led by Mohammad Bahmanbeigi, a native Kashkay, who was a loyal agent of the Pahlavi national ideology and an active promoter of Persian language and literature".

"Mr. Bahmanbeigi visited the U.S. where he took a keen interest in social process. He was particularly interested by the public schools. The following year he returned with a mission. Bahmanbeigi has identified as the local person to cooperate with, and to facilitate American assistance."

"Mr. Bahmanbeigi, in his literary works published under the Islamic Republic, denies this loyalty and states in any occasion that he worked only for the sake of Qashqai people who was suffering from a harsh poverty and socio-cultural inferiority rooting in its historical undeveloped way of life compared with surrounding Iranian society. In his fictional-documentary-autobiographical short narratives, he also depicts the injustice and cruelty Pahlavi dynasty did against Qashqai people. (cf. Bukhārā-ye man, il-e man and his other works published in Persian)."

Bahmanbeigi was the author of the titles Bokharaye man iele man and Agar gharghaj nabood.

Bahmanbeigi and his work are the subject of two films. 2003's White Tents, by Kamran Heidari, competed in the Documentary category at the 2005 Tehran Short Film Competition. In 2008, Iranian director Mohammad-Ali Talebi announced plans to film a second Bahmanbeigi biopic. In 2005, the Iranian Academy of the Arts publicized the holding of a "glorification ceremony" to commemorate Bahmanbeigi.

== Death ==
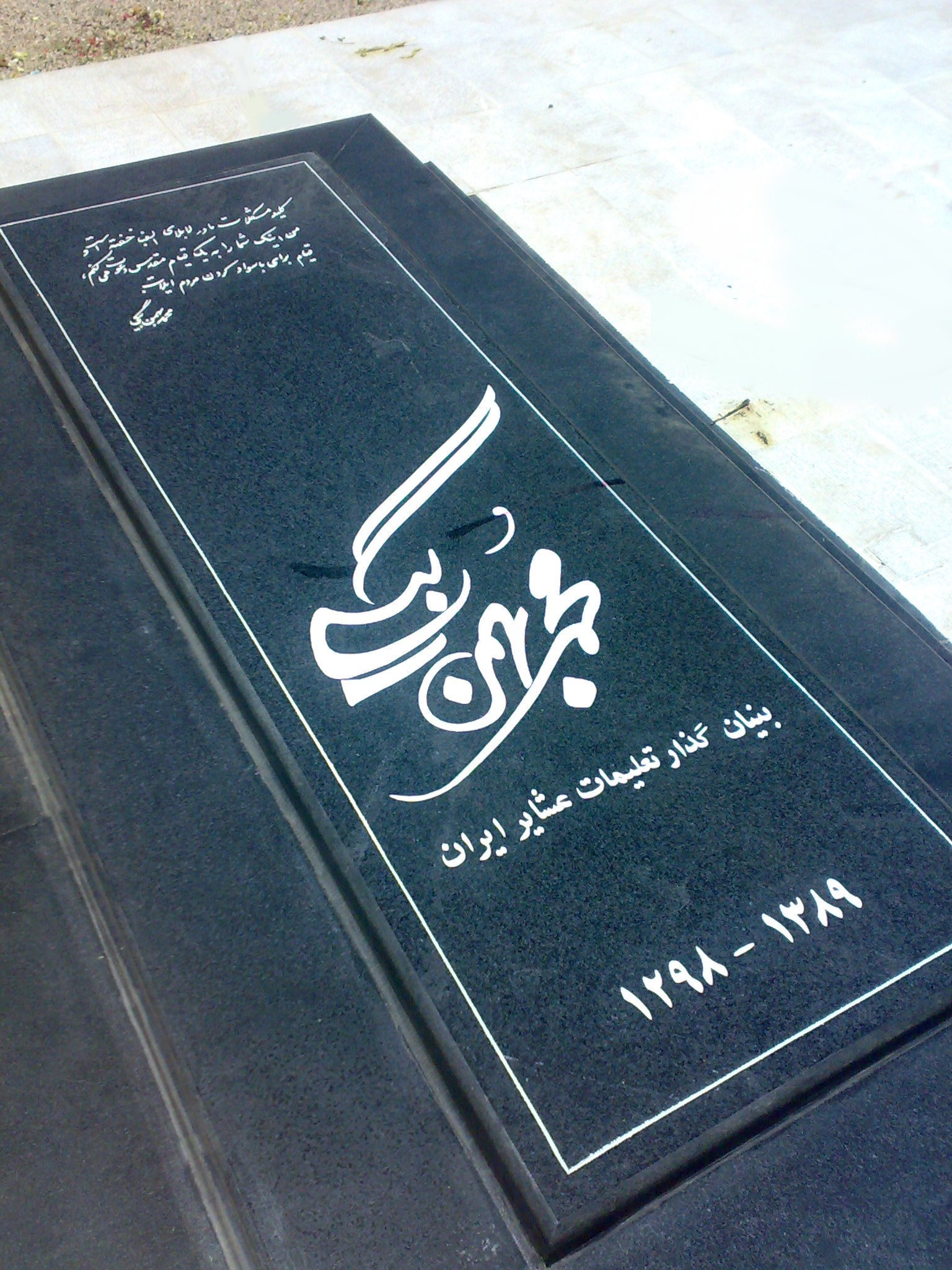
Tomb of Mohammad Bahmanbeigi, 2010

On 1 May 2010, Mohammad Bahmanbeigi died in Shiraz, Iran. He was 90.
