= Aydar =

Aydar may refer to:

== People ==
- Aydar Akhatov, Russian state, political and public figure, journalist, scientist-economist, ecologist, lawyer, artist.
- Aydar Nuriev, Russian racing driver
- Mariana Aydar, Brazilian singer
- Seher Aydar, Norwegian politician
- Zübeyir Aydar, Kurdish politician

== Other uses ==
- Aydar, Belgorod Oblast, locality in Russia
- Aidar Battalion, previously Aydar, a unit of the Ukrainian Ground Forces
- Aydar Lake, Uzbekistan
- River Aydar in East Ukraine and West Russia, usually transcripted as Aidar

== See also ==
- Aidar (disambiguation)
- Haider (disambiguation)
