= Haydar =

- Pronunciation: Arabic: [ˈħeːdɑr, ˈħæjdɑr]
- Gender: Male

Origin
- Language: Arabic
- Meaning: brave, lion
- Region of origin: Quraishi tribes, specifically Banu Hashim. in Mecca, Saudi Arabia.

Other names
- Alternative spelling: Hajdar, Hayder, Heidar, Haider, Heydar
- Variant forms: Hyder, Hyderi

Haydar (Arabic: حيدر), also spelt Hajdar, Hayder, Haidar, Heidar, Haider, Heydar, Hyder, and other variants, is an Arabic male given name, also used as a surname, and means an epithet for "lion".

In Islamic tradition, the name is primarily associated with Ali ibn Abi Talib (first Shia Imam and fourth Rashidun Caliph), because his mother named him that when he was born. It later became a nickname for him due to his bravery.

The variant Hyder (Urdu: حیدر) is an Urdu variant used predominantly by Muslims in South Asia.

== Hajdar ==
- Hajdar Blloshmi (1860–1936), Albanian politician
- Hajdar Muneka (1954–2022), Albanian journalist and diplomat

== Haydar ==
=== Given name ===
- Ali (600–661), the son-in-law and cousin of the Islamic prophet Muhammad, said to have been nicknamed "Haydar".
- Haydar Aşan (1906–1996), Turkish Olympian
- Haydar Çetinkaya (born 1976), Turkish para-Nordic skier
- Haydar Ergülen (born 1956), Turkish poet
- Haydar Ghazi, second Wazir of Sylhet
- Haydar Hassan Haj Al-Sidig (1949–2025), Sudanese footballer
- Haydar Hatemi (born 1945), Iranian artist
- Haydar al-Kuzbari (1920–1996), Syrian military officer
- Haydar al-Sadr (1891–1937), Muslim Iraqi cleric and ayatollah
- Haydar Karataş (born 2007), Turkish footballer
- Haydar Khan e Amo-oghli (1880–1921), revolutionary and military activist in Iran, Republic of Azerbaijan and Central Asia
- Haydar Zorlu (born 1967), Turkish-German actor
- Haydar Astrakhani (died 1541), Khan of Astrakhan from 1538 through 1541.
- Haydar Amuli (1319–1385), or Haydar al-'Obaydi al-Husayni Amoli, a Shi'ite mystic and Sufi philosopher

=== Middle name ===
- Ali Haydar Şen (born 1939), Turkish businessman
- Mohammed Haydar Zammar (born 1961), Syrian Muslim jihadist and al-Qaida recruiter

=== Surname ===
- Darren Haydar (born 1979), Canadian professional ice hockey player
- Kamal Haydar (1933–1980), Yemeni short story writer
- Paula Haydar (born 1965), American academic and translator
- Qutb ad-Dīn Haydar (died 1221), Persian Sufi saint
- Shaykh Haydar (1459–1488), a religious leader of the Safaviyya from 1460 to 1488
- Sultan Haydar (born 1987), Turkish female long-distance runner of Ethiopian origin

== Haidar ==
- Adnan Haidar (born 1989), Lebanese footballer
- Celine Haidar (born 2005), Lebanese footballer
- Haidar Haidar (1936–2023), Syrian writer and novelist.
- Ibrahim Haidar (1867–1974), Lebanese politician
- Mohamad Haidar (born 1989), Lebanese footballer
- Ossama Haidar (born 1980), Lebanese footballer
- Que Haidar (born 1979), Malaysian actor
- Salim Haidar (1911–1980), Lebanese politician
- Haider Abbas Rizvi (born 1968), Pakistani politician

== Hayder ==
- Hayder Ali (1720–1782) Founder of Mysore Sultanate and Father of Tipu Sultan
- Hayder of Crimea, Khan of Crimea

== Other variant spellings ==
For people with these variant spellings, see:

- Heidar
- Haider
- Heydar
- Hyder (name)
- Hyderi (name)
- Heydari (name)
- Aidar (disambiguation) - Brazilian Portuguese variant
- Aydar (disambiguation) - Brazilian Portuguese variant
- Gaidar (surname) - Russian (or Russian-influenced) variant

== See also ==
- Asad, an Arabic given name meaning "lion"
- Hai (surname), a Chinese derivative of Haydar
- Haider (given name), a South Asian and Arabic given name
- Haider (surname), a South Asian, Arabic, and German surname
- Heider (surname), an unrelated German surname
- Lions in Islam
- Qaswarah
