= Batted ball =

In baseball and softball, a pitched ball that is contacted by the batter's bat

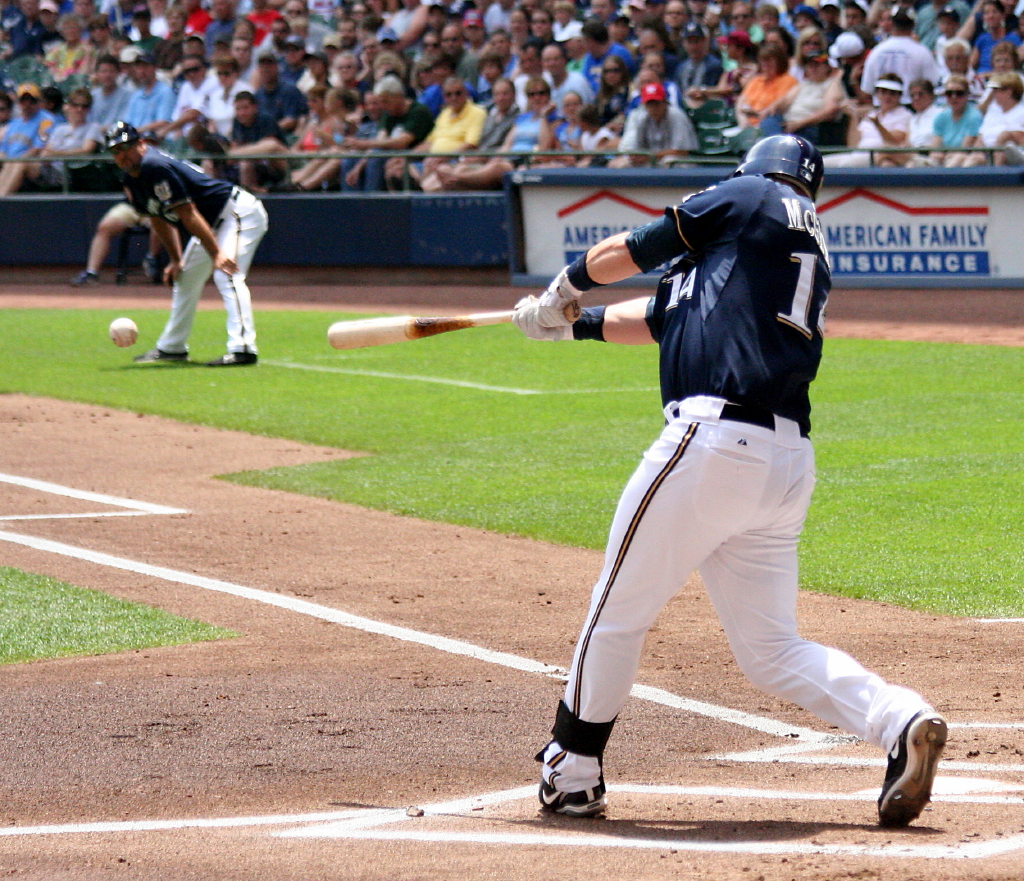
Casey McGehee on the Milwaukee Brewers puts a ball in play

In the sports of baseball and softball, a batted ball is a pitch that has been contacted by the batter's bat. Batted balls are either fair or foul, and can be characterized as a fly ball, pop-up, line drive, or ground ball. In baseball, a foul ball counts as a strike against the batter, unless there are already two strikes on the batter, with special rules applying to foul tips and foul bunts. Fly balls are those hit in an arcing manner, with pop-ups being a subset of fly balls that do not travel far. Line drives are batted balls hit on a straight line trajectory, while ground balls are hit at a low trajectory, contact the ground shortly after being hit, and then either roll or bounce. Batted balls, especially line drives, can present a hazard to players, umpires, and spectators, as people have been seriously injured or killed after being struck by batted balls.

== Fair or foul ==
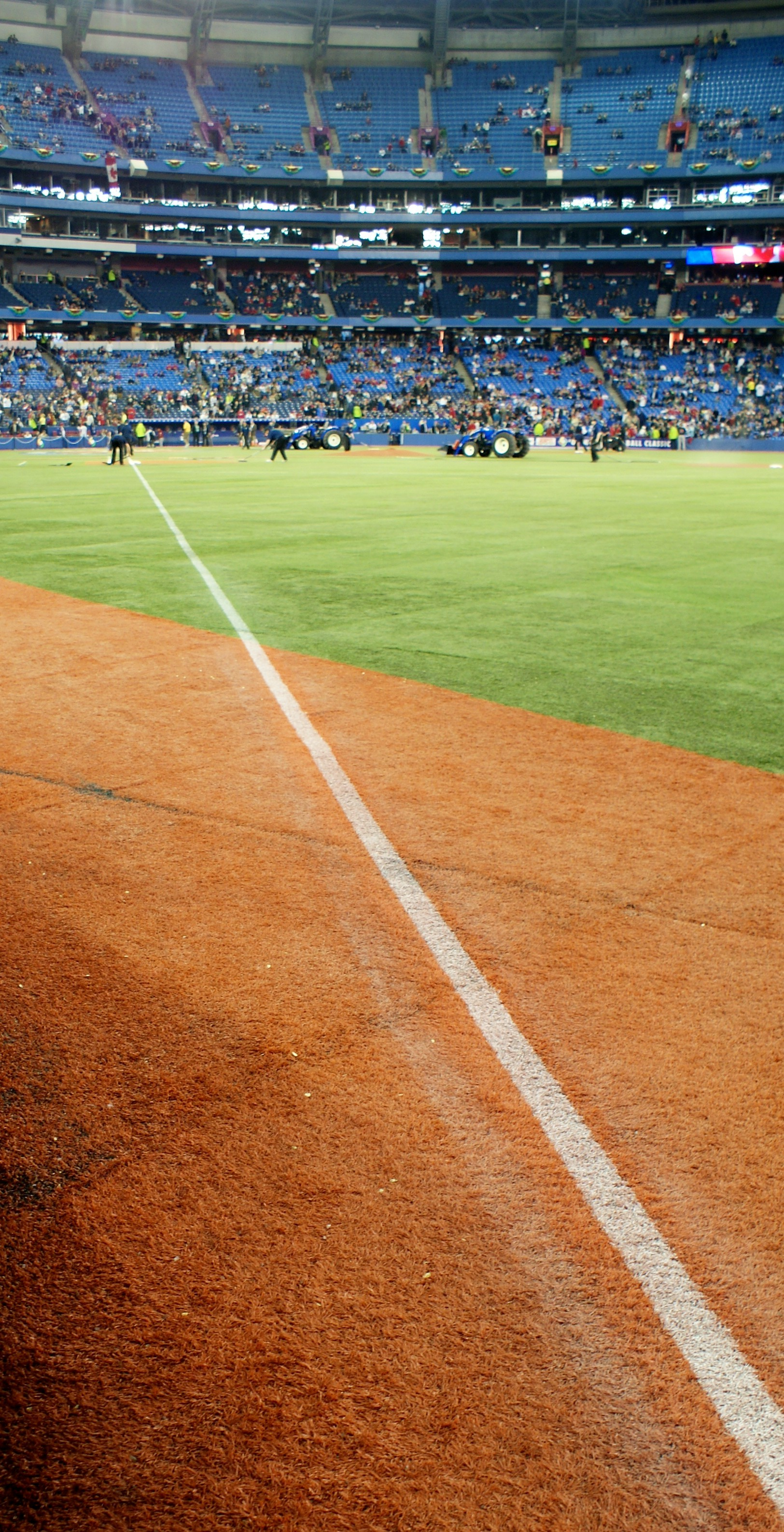
A view along a first base foul line, looking from the outfield wall back towards home plate

On the playing field, two straight lines (each known as a foul line) are drawn from the corner of home plate; one past first base and one past third base. The foul lines extend all the way to the outer limit of the outfield, typically a wall or fence, and perpendicularly up the wall or fence. The entire area between foul lines, including the foul lines themselves, is considered fair territory; anything not in fair territory is considered foul territory.

In general, batted balls are judged by where they land (first contact the ground) or are first touched by a player. That is, a batted ball landing in fair territory or first touched by a player in fair territory is fair, while a batted ball landing in foul territory or first touched by a player in foul territory is foul. However, batted balls that have not yet reached first base or third base are judged on either where they are initially touched by a player or where they come to rest. For example, if a batted ball lands in foul territory between home and first base, then rolls into fair territory, and is touched there (or comes to rest there) it is fair. Likewise, if a batted ball lands in fair territory between home and first base, then rolls into foul territory, and is touched there (or comes to rest there), it is foul.

That a batted ball hit into the ground has to pass first base or third base in fair territory to be considered fair originated in response to "fair-foul" hitting of the 1860s and 1870s. Batters would intentionally hit the ball into the ground in fair territory near home plate, at an angle that would send it into foul territory away from the fielders, allowing the batter to reach first base successfully. Dickey Pearce, a well-known and respected player of the era, is credited with inventing the tactic.

=== Effect ===
Fielders can attempt to make an out by catching any ball hit in the air, fair or foul, as long as it is still in play. Balls that leave the field of play, such as by going into spectator areas or the dugouts, are out of play. For balls on the ground, fielders can attempt to make an out on fair balls only.

A batted ball that clears the outfield fence in fair territory is a home run. Since 1931, whether such a batted ball is fair or foul is judged on its position when it leaves the field (that is, where it is as it passes over the outfield fence or wall). Previously, the ball had to be "fair when last seen" to be ruled a home run. Also since 1931, the ball must clear the fence or wall on the fly to be a home run; previously, the ball could bounce over and still be considered a home run—such a batted ball is now an automatic double.

A foul ball normally counts as a strike unless the batter already has had two strikes assessed against them, in which case the count does not change. Treating foul balls as strikes was adopted by the National League in 1901 and the American League in 1903. There are specific rules for foul tips and foul bunts, which are described below. In slow-pitch softball, a foul ball always counts as a strike, even when the batter already has two strikes.

== Characterization ==
Major League Baseball (MLB) uses four characterizations for all batted balls put into play:

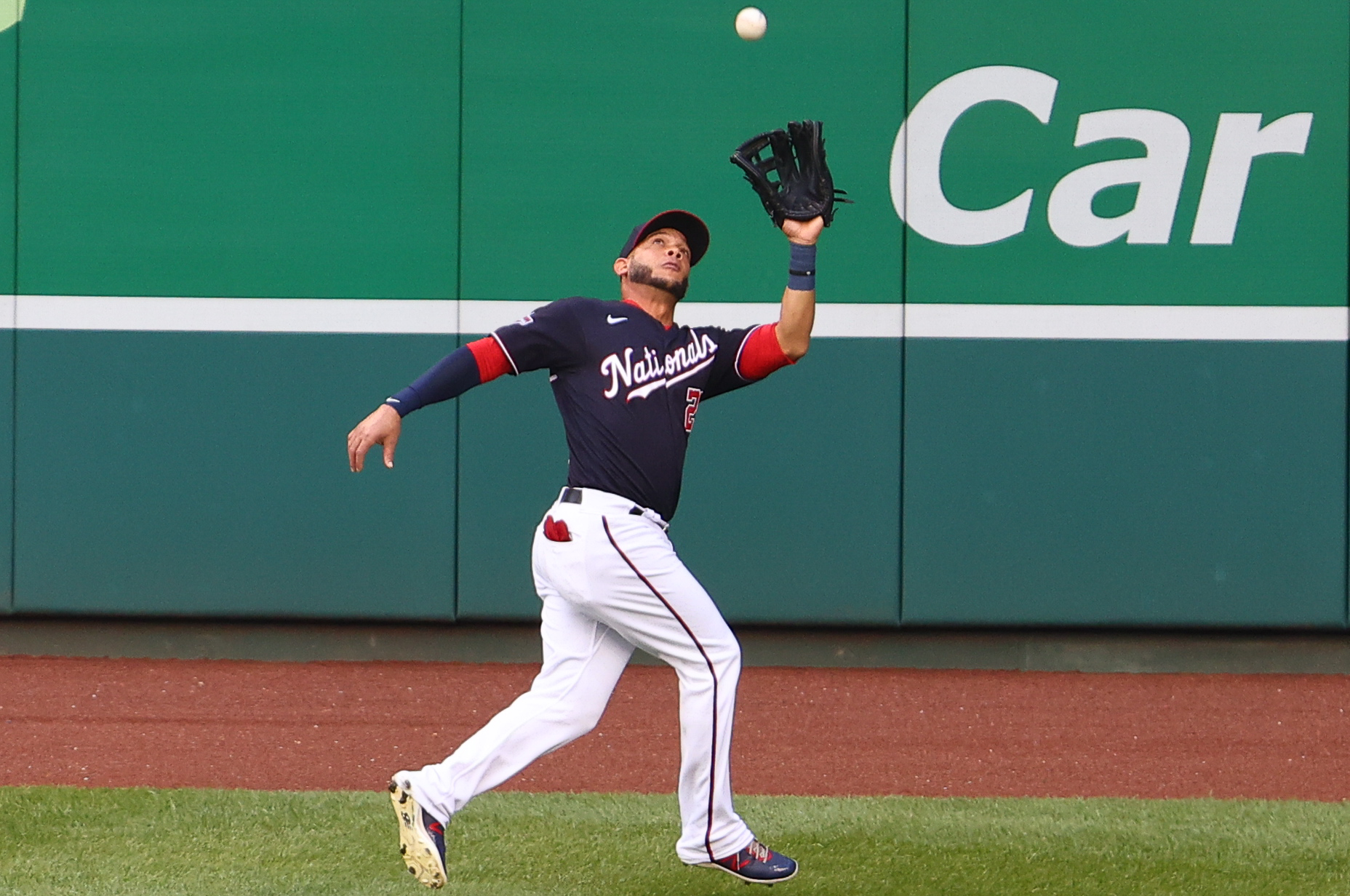
An outfielder about to catch a fly ball

=== Fly ball ===
A fly ball is a batted ball hit in an arcing manner. For statistical purposes, (Note: The term "pop-up", while defined on MLB.com, does not appear in MLB's Official Baseball Rules.) MLB uses the term "fly ball" for such balls that go into the outfield, and a separate term (pop-up, below) for such balls that stay in the infield.

Fielders attempt to catch fly balls on their descent, and an out is recorded if the ball is caught before it hits the ground. Under early baseball rules, a fly ball caught on a bounce also resulted in an out; this was abolished for fair balls in 1864 and for foul balls in 1883.

=== Pop-up ===
A pop-up is a fly ball that does not travel far; rather than going into the outfield, it is hit to the infield. Such a batted ball may, under specific circumstances, be deemed an "infield fly" by an umpire, which has special consideration as outlined below.

=== Line drive ===
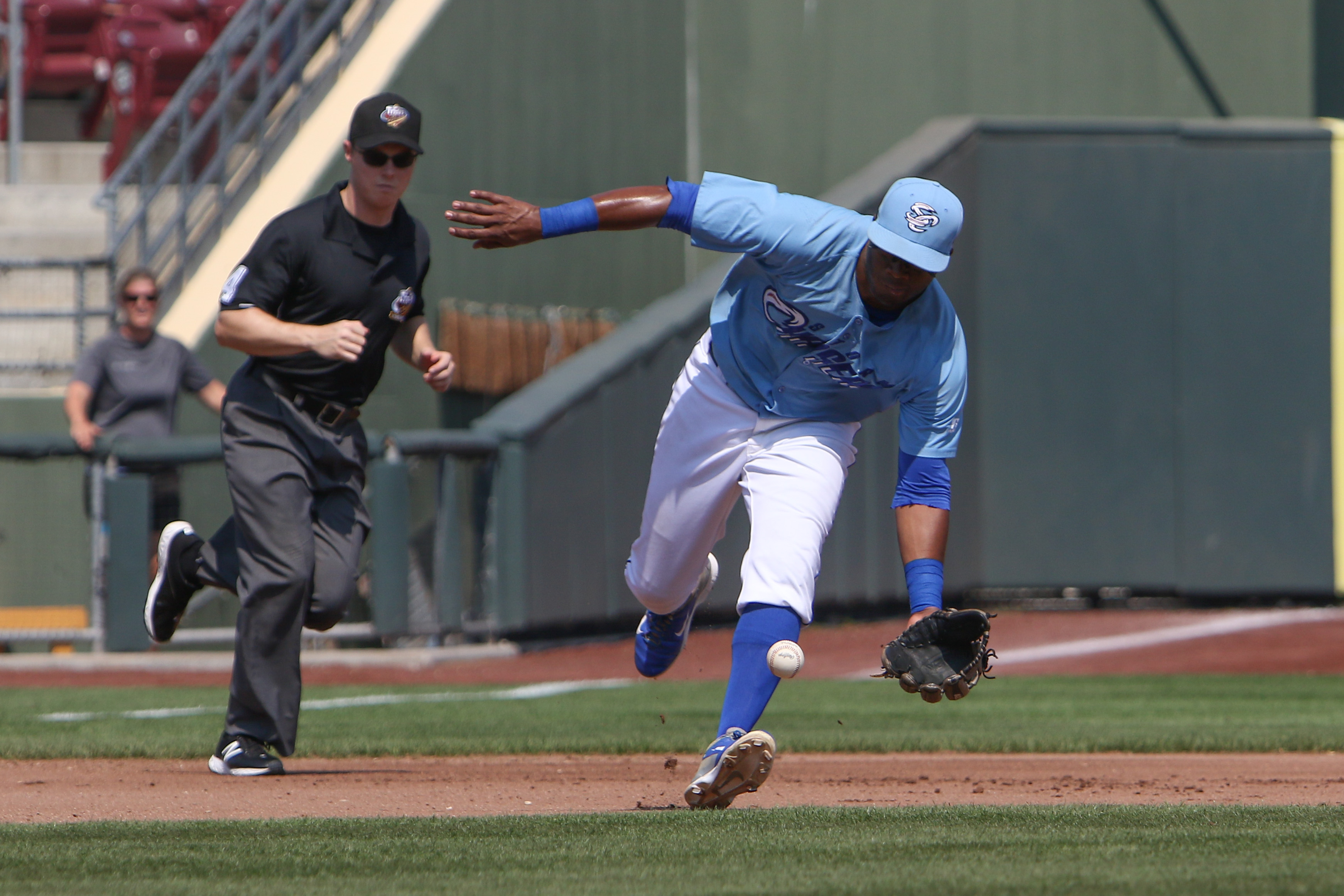
An infielder about to field a ground ball

A line drive (colloquially, a "liner" or "rope") is a batted ball "hit in a nearly straight line usually not far above the ground." Batters are usually most successful when they hit line drives, reaching base over 70% of the time, as compared to about 25% of the time on ground balls or fly balls.

=== Ground ball ===
A ground ball (colloquially, a "grounder") is a batted ball hit at a low enough trajectory that it contacts the ground a short distance after being hit and "rolls or bounces close to the ground." The term is not used for fly balls, pop-ups, or line drives that are uncaught and happen to contact the ground.

== Statistics ==
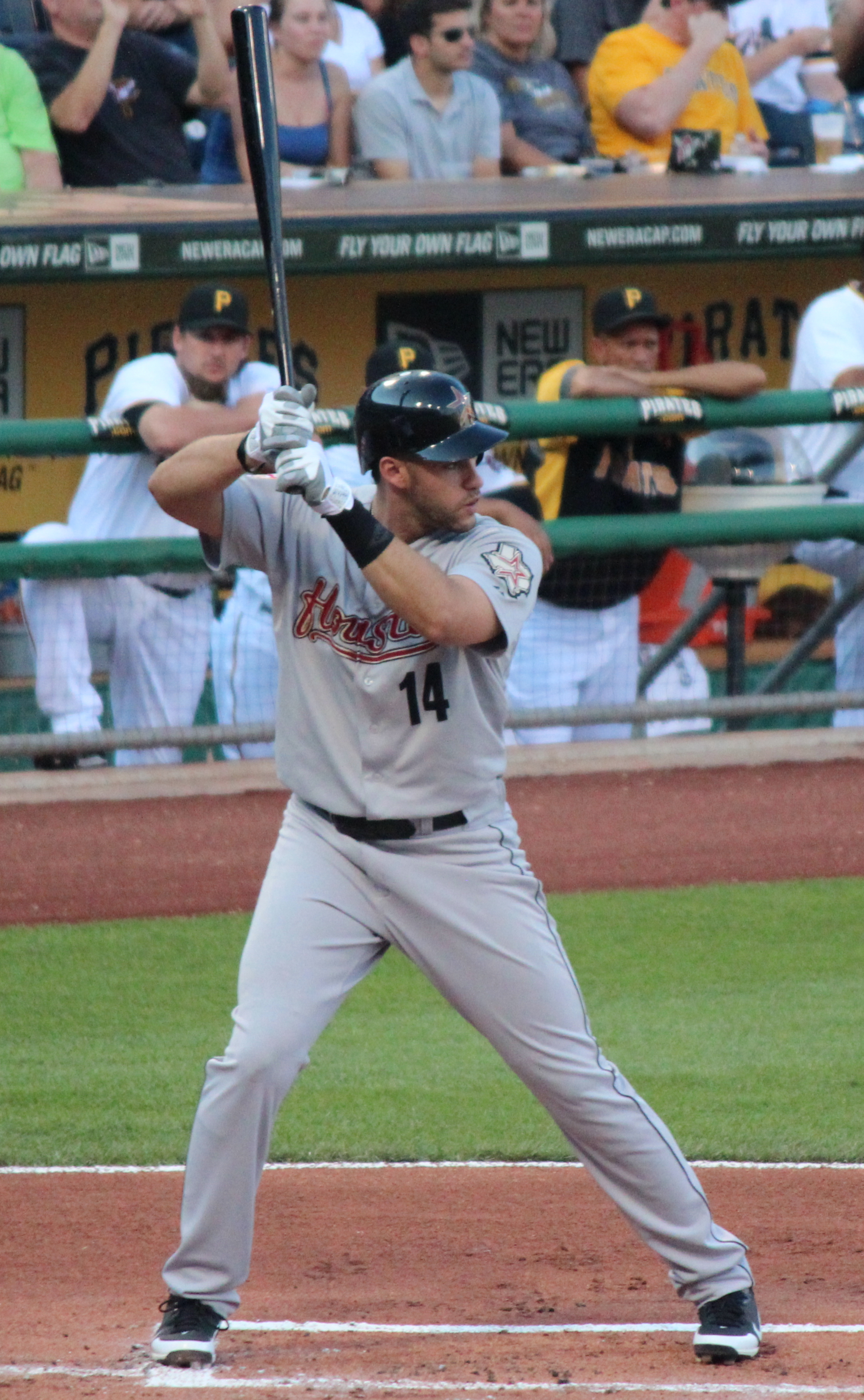
J. D. Martinez batting in 2012

MLB.com provides statistics for hitters, using the above four categories, as part of a "Batted Ball Profile". For example, during the 2022 season, for the balls that designated hitter J. D. Martinez of the Boston Red Sox put into play, 38.2% were ground balls, 30.8% were fly balls, 26.7% were line drives, and 4.3% were pop-ups (the four figures sum to 100%).

FanGraphs also provides batted ball statistics, but uses the four categories slightly differently: all balls put into play are characterized into one of three categories: ground ball, fly ball (regardless of where hit), or line drive. The percentage of fly balls that were hit in the infield is then provided as a separate figure. FanGraphs's statistics for Martinez for the 2022 season indicate 38.2% ground balls, 39.7% fly balls, and 22.1% line drives (Note: Batted ball figures on FanGraphs and MLB.com may vary—categorizing batted balls is ultimately subjective.) (the three figures sum to 100%). Martinez also had a 5.8% "infield fly ball percentage", meaning that 5.8% of the fly balls he hit were infield pop-ups.

In 2010, FanGraphs noted that the "league average" for batted ball rates was 44% ground balls, 35% fly balls, and 21% line drives (the three figures sum to 100%) with 11% of fly balls being infield pop-ups.

== Special cases ==
The following have special rules considerations.

=== Infield fly ===
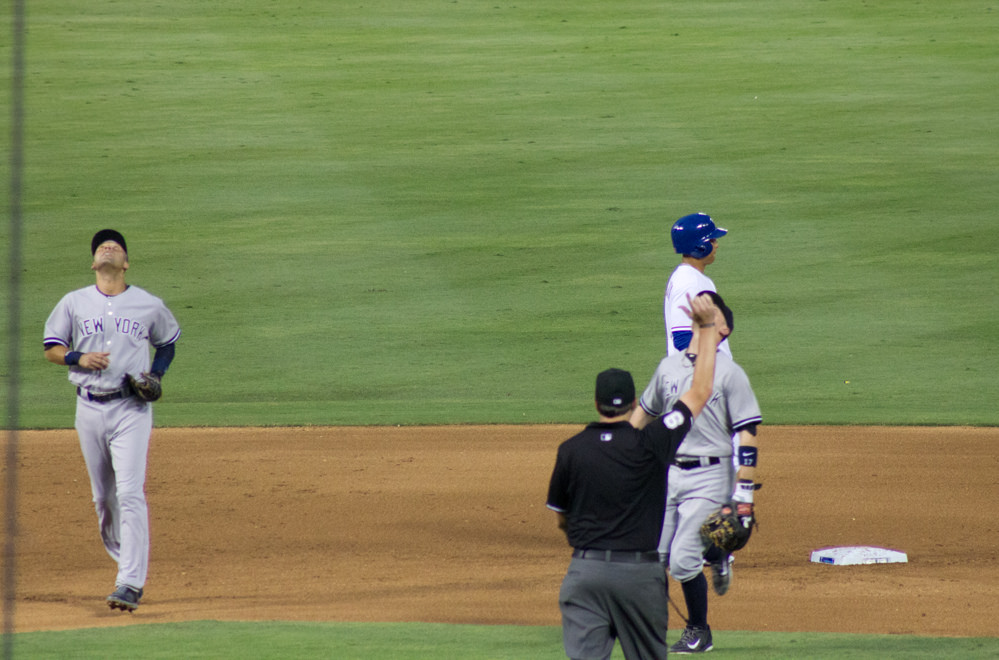
An umpire (in black shirt) indicating an infield fly—a verbal call is also made

A specific rule applies to infielders attempting to catch some fly balls: the infield fly rule, which has specific context. If (and only if) there are less than two outs and there are baserunners on first base and second base (or the bases are loaded), a fly ball "which can be caught by an infielder with ordinary effort" results in the batter being called out, regardless of whether the ball is caught. This rule is in place to prevent infielders from intentionally not catching the ball and being able to record multiple outs via a force play.

An infield fly is verbally declared by an umpire, whose decision "should be made immediately". Umpires commonly also give a visual indication by pointing straight up in the air with their right arm. If a batted ball declared to be an infield fly is left untouched and it comes to rest (or is first touched) in foul territory before passing first base or third base, it is treated the same as any other foul ball (that is, the batter is not automatically out). The infield fly rule was adopted in 1895.

=== Foul tip ===
By rule, a foul tip is "a batted ball that goes sharp and direct from the bat to the catcher's hands and is legally caught." A foul tip is considered to be the same as a regular strike, thus a foul tip (that is caught per the definition) with two strikes already against the batter results in a strikeout. This provision has been part of baseball rules since 1895.

=== Bunt ===
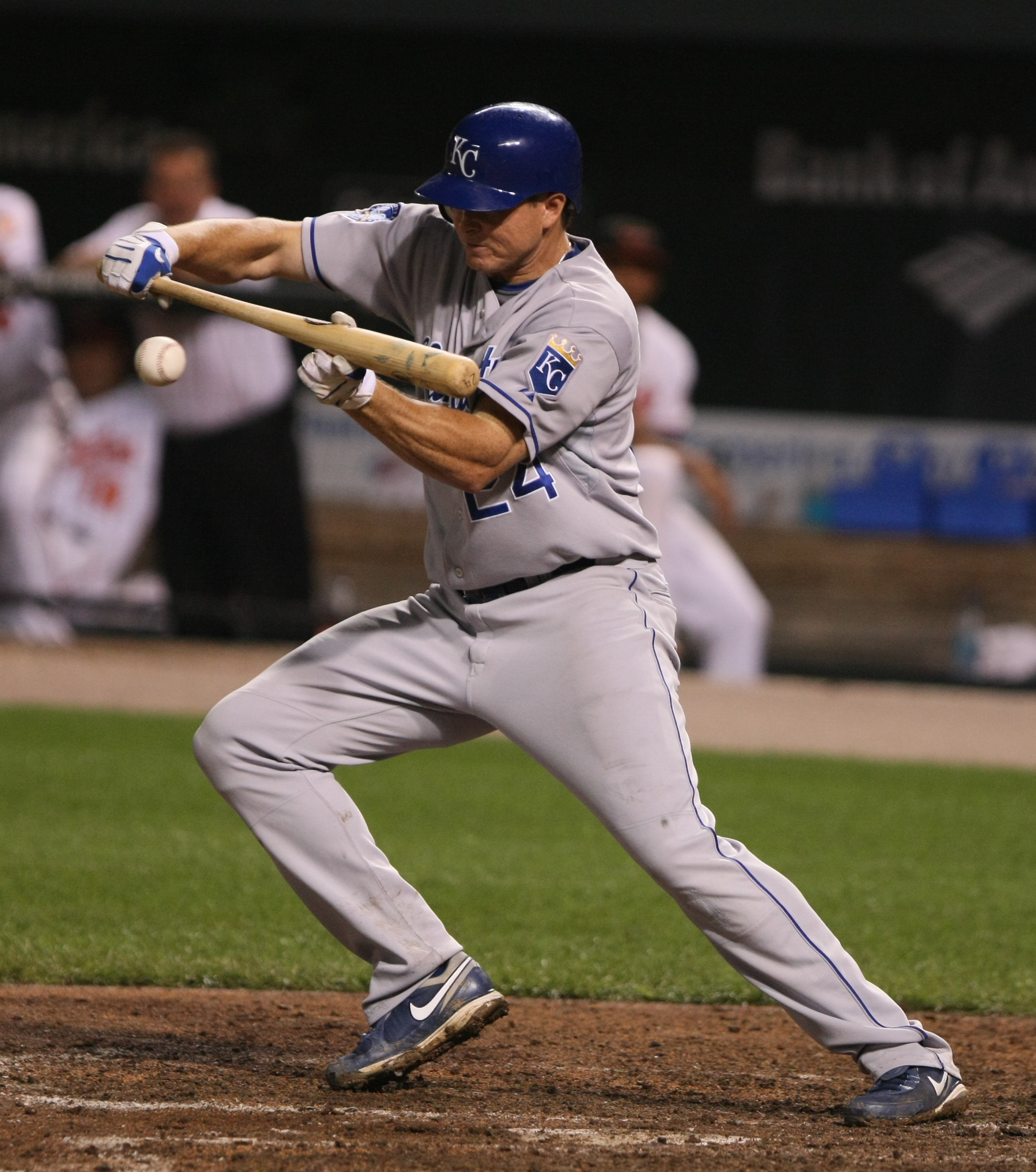
A batter bunting—note the position of his hands on the bat

A bunt is a special type of batted ball. Bunts occur when pitched balls are "intentionally met with the bat" rather than being swung at. A ball that is bunted by a batter may be fair or foul, and while generally it does not travel very far, it may be a ground ball (the desired outcome), pop-up, or (rarely) line drive.

==== Foul bunt ====
Unlike other types of batted balls, for which a third strike is not assessed when a foul ball is hit with two strikes in the count, a third strike is assessed to the batter when a two-strike bunt goes foul, resulting in a strikeout. This rule originated as early as 1894 in response to batters intentionally bunting pitches foul in order to tire the pitcher, also impacting pace of play.

== Safety concerns ==
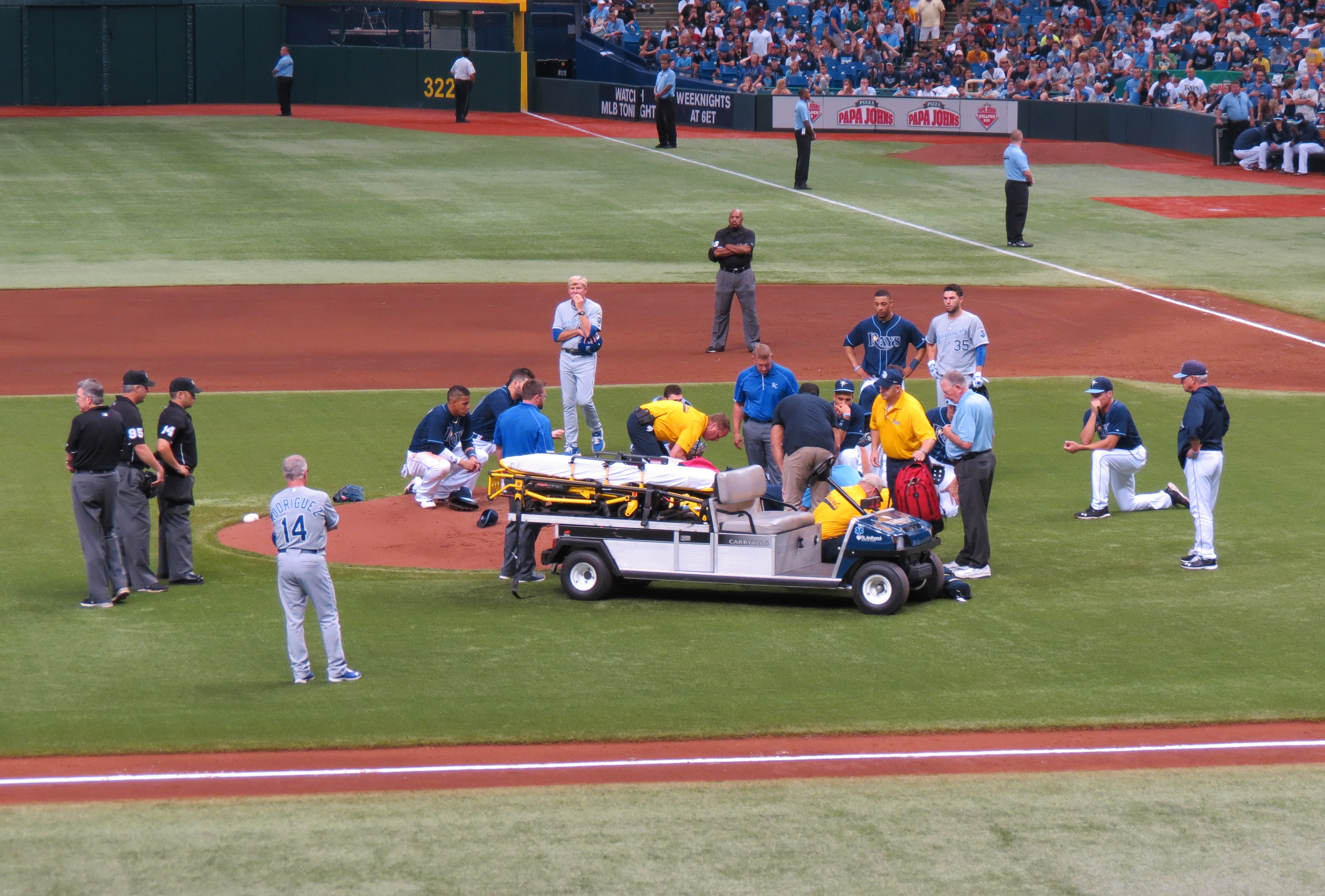
Pitcher Alex Cobb receives medical attention after being hit by a line drive on June 15, 2013.

Batted balls, especially line drives, can be dangerous to players, umpires, and spectators. There are myriad examples; several are provided below. A batted ball hit sharply at the pitcher is known as a "comebacker".

In August 1982, Jim Rice of the Boston Red Sox left the dugout to carry a young boy that had been hit by a foul line drive into the team's clubhouse for medical treatment; the boy later underwent emergency surgery at a local hospital. In July 2007, first base coach Mike Coolbaugh was killed when a foul line drive hit him in the head during a minor-league game. Umpire Dale Scott had to leave a game in August 2012 after being struck by a foul tip while serving as home plate umpire, and also had to leave a game in June 2015 when struck by a line drive while umpiring at second base. In May 2019, a young fan at a Houston Astros game required hospitalization after being hit with a foul line drive. In a June 2021 minor-league game, pitcher Tyler Zombro was hit in the head by a 104 mph (167 km/h) line drive, fracturing his skull and causing him to have a seizure.

== See also ==
- Baltimore chop
- Batting average on balls in play (BABIP)
- Ground ball/fly ball ratio (GB/FB)
