= Luke Scott (baseball) =

American baseball player (born 1978)

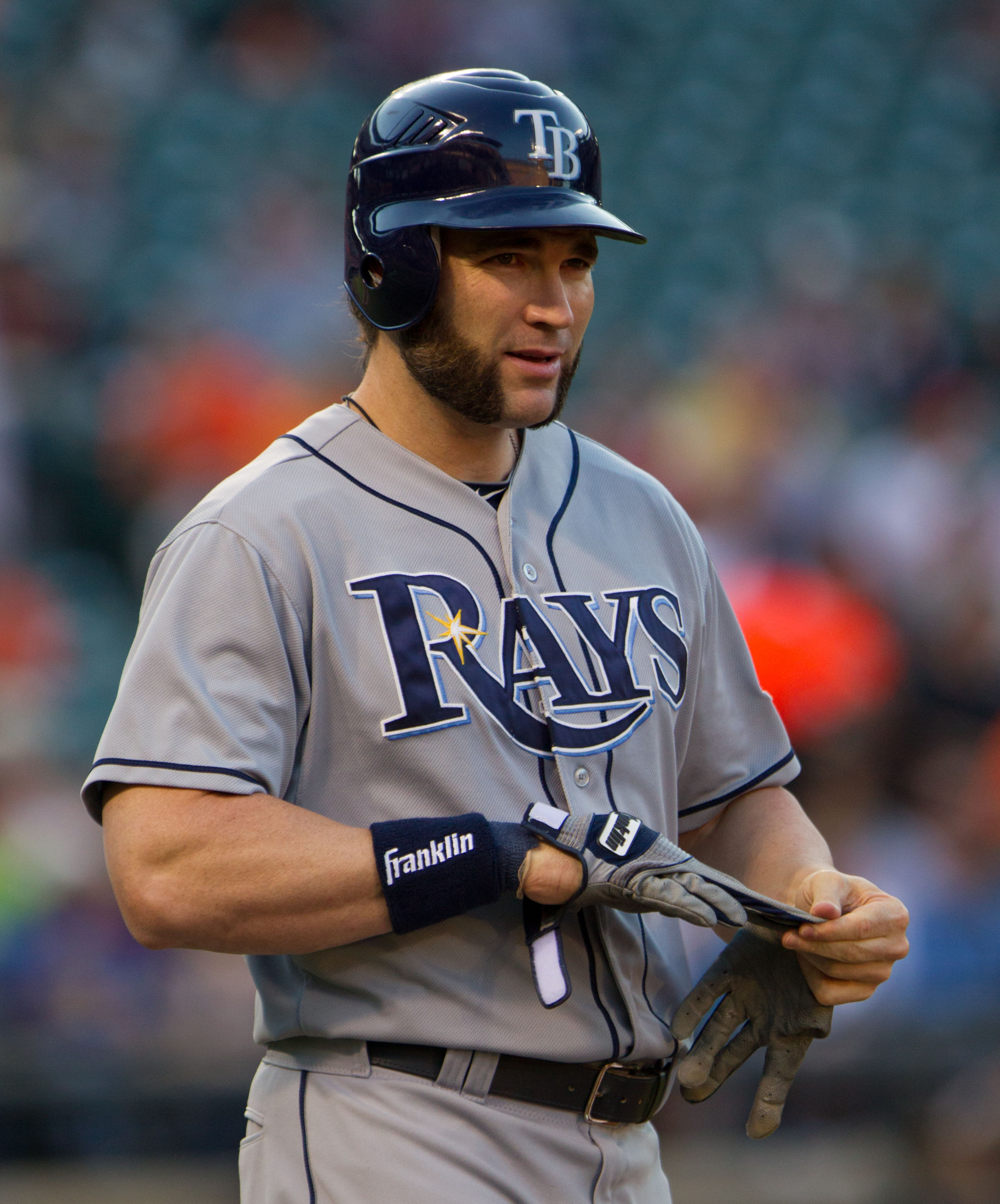
- Scott with the Tampa Bay Rays
- Outfielder / Designated hitter
- Born: June 25, 1978 (age 48); DeLeon Springs, Florida, U.S.
- Batted: Left Threw: Right

Professional debut
- MLB: April 5, 2005, for the Houston Astros
- KBO: March 29, 2014, for the SK Wyverns

Last appearance
- MLB: September 27, 2013, for the Tampa Bay Rays
- KBO: July 4, 2014, for the SK Wyverns

MLB statistics
- Batting average: .258
- Home runs: 135
- Runs batted in: 436

KBO statistics
- Batting average: .267
- Home runs: 6
- Runs batted in: 17
- Stats at Baseball Reference

Teams
- Houston Astros (2005–2007); Baltimore Orioles (2008–2011); Tampa Bay Rays (2012–2013); SK Wyverns (2014)

Luke Brandon Scott (born June 25, 1978) is an American former professional baseball designated hitter and left fielder. He played in Major League Baseball (MLB) for the Houston Astros, Baltimore Orioles, and Tampa Bay Rays, and in the KBO League for the SK Wyverns.

== Early life and college ==
Scott attended DeLand High School in DeLand, Florida, where he batted .460 and .420 in his junior and senior years respectively and was part of their IB program. He graduated there in 1997. Scott attended Oklahoma State University, where he earned All-Big 12 Conference honors on the Oklahoma State Cowboys baseball team. He was drafted by the Tampa Bay Devil Rays in the 45th round (1,327th overall) of the 2000 Major League Baseball draft, but did not sign. In the summer of 2000, Scott played for the Falmouth Commodores of the Cape Cod Baseball League, and also played for the Staunton Braves in the Valley Baseball League. He also played baseball at Indian River Community College.

== Professional baseball career ==
=== Cleveland Indians ===
Scott was drafted by the Cleveland Indians in the ninth round (277th overall) of the 2001 Major League Baseball draft. He spent his first professional season in 2001 at home recovering from Tommy John surgery on his elbow joint. He made his professional debut for the Columbus Red Stixx of the South Atlantic League in 2002. He played for the Indians' organization through 2003, making stops at Kinston and Akron.

=== Houston Astros ===
Scott was traded by the Indians to the Houston Astros for Jeriome Robertson on March 31, 2004. He made his Major League debut on April 5, 2005, against the St. Louis Cardinals, and was hitless in three at-bats in that game. His first hit was a triple to centerfield off Ramón Ortiz of the Cincinnati Reds on April 8, 2005. He appeared in 34 games that season and posted a .188 batting average with 4 RBI.

Scott became the first Astros' rookie to hit for the cycle, accomplishing an "unnatural cycle" (home run, triple, double, and single, in that order) on July 28, 2006. Scott hit his first career home run, off Enrique González, in the same game. After the completion of the 2007 season, Scott headed to Venezuela to play another season in the Winter League, where he earned Winter League all-star honors.

=== Baltimore Orioles ===
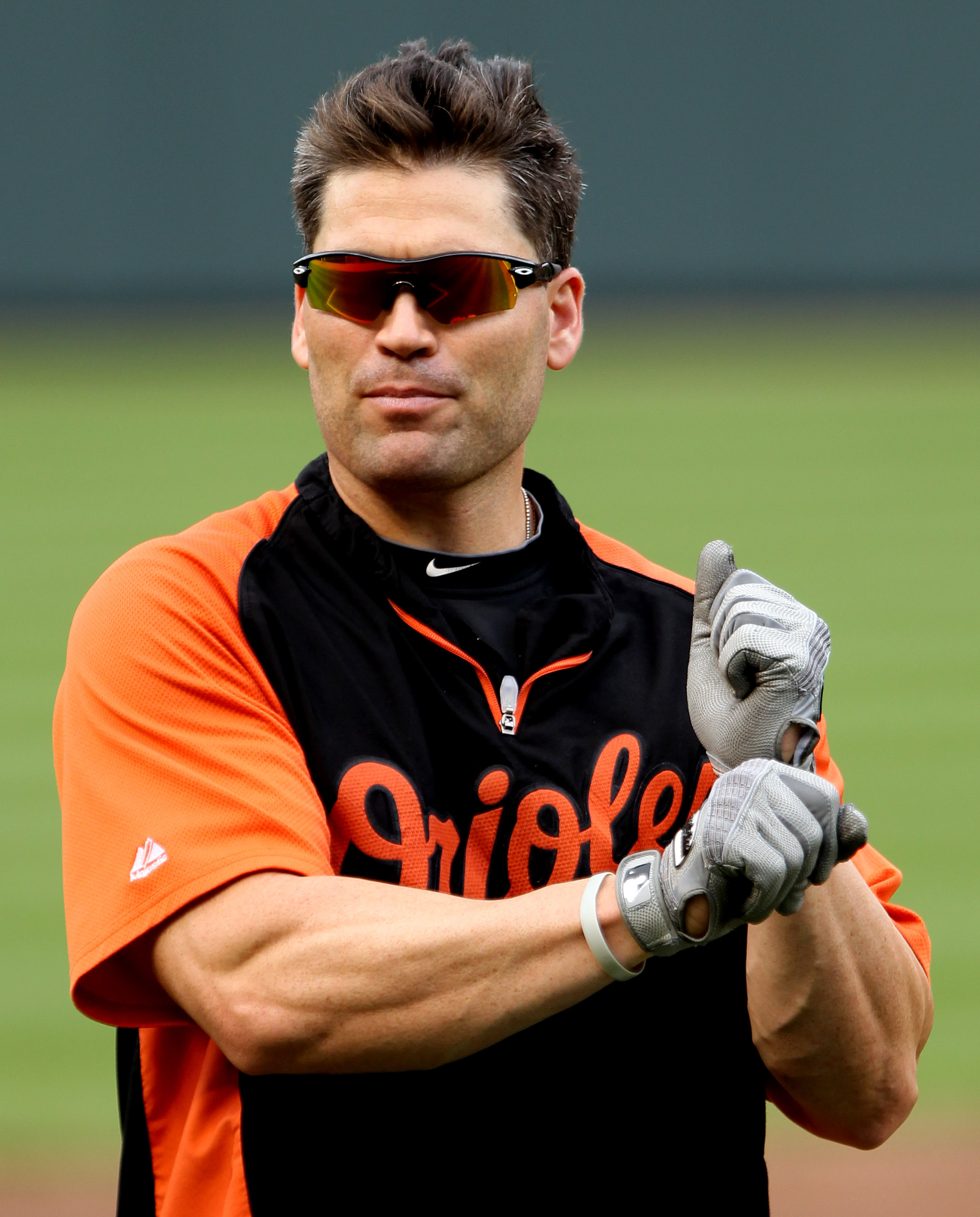
Scott with the Baltimore Orioles in 2011.

Scott was traded to the Orioles with Matt Albers, Troy Patton, Dennis Sarfate and Mike Costanzo for Miguel Tejada on December 12, 2007.

Scott appeared in a career-high 148 games for the Orioles in 2008, batting .257 with 23 home runs and 65 runs batted in. In May, Scott was involved in a benches-clearing situation after New York Yankees pitcher LaTroy Hawkins threw a fastball near his head. Home plate umpire Chuck Meriwether ejected Hawkins and then restrained Scott from confronting the pitcher. Hawkins was suspended for three games.

On July 7, 2009, Scott had a career high seven RBIs against the Seattle Mariners, going 3-for-4 with a single, triple, and home run. After Aubrey Huff was dealt to the Detroit Tigers in August 2009, the Orioles starting using Scott as an occasional first baseman. Scott was named Most Valuable Oriole for the 2010 season.

In 2011, Scott batted .220 with nine home runs and 22 RBI in 64 games, and struck out 54 times in 209 at-bats. The Orioles declined to offer him a contract for 2012, making him a free agent.

=== Tampa Bay Rays ===
On January 12, 2012, Scott signed a one-year deal with a player option for 2013 with the Tampa Bay Rays. His option was declined on October 31, making him a free agent. On February 6, 2013, he was re-signed by the Rays to a one-year, $2.75 million, contract.

Scott was placed on the 15-day DL with a calf strain on March 31, 2013. On April 30, Scott was activated from the disabled list, and Shelley Duncan, who had been getting most of the time at designated hitter in Scott's absence, was designated for assignment to make room on the roster. On August 17, Scott was placed on the disabled list with back spasms. After his return on September 1, he was used mostly off the bench. His best month was July, where in 20 games, he hit .284 with four home runs and 11 RBI. In 91 games in 2013, including a team-leading 61 starts at designated hitter, he hit .241 with nine home runs and 40 RBI.

=== SK Wyverns ===
On December 19, 2013, Scott agreed to a one-year, $300,000 deal with the SK Wyverns of the KBO League. The $300,000 is made up of a $50,000 signing bonus and a $250,000 contract. On July 16, it was reported that Scott had been cut from the team for calling the coach, Lee Man-soo, a "liar" and a "coward".

=== Pericos de Puebla ===
On April 4, 2015, Scott signed with the Pericos de Puebla of the Mexican League. He played in 28 games with them, hitting .292 with seven homers and 27 RBI. He was released on May 13.

=== Toronto Blue Jays ===
Scott signed with the Toronto Blue Jays on a minor league deal on May 15, 2015, and was assigned to the Triple-A Buffalo Bisons. He was released on August 13 after batting .240 in 52 games.

== Personal life ==
Scott enjoys hunting and is a firearms enthusiast. He was among those featured on a segment about athletes and gun possession in the December 10, 2006 installment of Outside the Lines. He is a supporter of greater personal responsibility and smaller government.

In 2010, during the dispute regarding President Obama's birth certificate, Scott said that Obama was not born in the United States. Scott added: "I was born here. If someone accuses me of not being born here, I can go – within 10 minutes – to my filing cabinet and I can pick up my real birth certificate and I can go, 'See? Look! Here it is. Here it is.' The man has dodged everything. He dodges questions, he doesn't answer anything. And why? Because he's hiding something."

== See also ==
- List of Major League Baseball players to hit for the cycle

Achievements
Preceded by José Reyes	Hitting for the cycle July 28, 2006	Succeeded by Carlos Guillén
