= Hired armed cutter Lord Nelson =

Name for three hired armed vessels of the Royal Navy

During the French Revolutionary and Napoleonic Wars the Royal Navy used several vessels that bore the designation His Majesty's hired armed cutter Lord Nelson, all named for Lord Horatio Nelson.

== First Hired armed cutter Lord Nelson ==
This cutter served the Royal Navy from 17 December 1798 to 7 December 1801. She carried twelve 12-pounder carronades and was of 156 46/94 tons (bm).

On 3 March 1799, Lord Nelson, under the command of Lieutenant Robert Percy, together with the Hired armed lugger Brave, captured the two-mast ships Baron Von Hopkin and Sverige Lycka. Then on 22 March Lord Nelson captured Two Brothers. On 13 September 1804, prize money for Baron Von Hopkin and Sverige Lycka was paid.

On 1 July 1800, Lord Nelson was in company with Fisgard, Renown, and Defence in Bourneuf Bay when they sent in their boats to attack a French convoy at Île de Noirmoutier. The British destroyed the French ship Therese (of 20 guns), a lugger (12 guns), two schooners (6 guns each), and a cutter (6 guns), of unknown names. The cutting out party also burned some 15 merchant vessels loaded with corn and supplies for the French fleet at Brest. However, in this enterprise, 92 officers and men out of the entire party of 192 men, fell prisoners to the French when their boats became stranded. Lord Nelson had contributed no men to the attacking force and so had no casualties. (Note: She did share in the head money. An Able Seaman received 3s 11 3/4d, and her commander received £6 8s 7 1/2d, in 1825.)

On 12 October 1800, Montague, Magnificent, and Lord Nelson captured eight small French vessels. Later that month, on 21 October, the same three vessels, joined by Marlborough, captured a small French vessel, marked Letter F. Two days later, Montague, Marlborough and Lord Nelson captured Marquireto. Two days after that, Montague and Lord Nelson captured Maria Rose, and Two Wrecks.

== Second Hired armed cutter Lord Nelson ==
This cutter carried six 4-pounder guns and was of 67 74/9 tons (bm). She served the Royal Navy from 1 June 1803 to 12 December 1804.

On 23 March 1804, while under the command of Lieutenant Henry Hopewell Budd, Lord Nelson recaptured the ship Young William.

Under the command of Lieutenant George N. Tremlett, Lord Nelson captured Experiment, Mayners, master, and Two Sisters on 29 July and 5 August.

On 2 August Scorpion, with Lord Nelson in company, captured the Prussian vessel Ignatius. Ignatius, or Ignatus, Bakker, master, was carrying masts from Riga when Scorpion detained her and sent her into Yarmouth.

Circa 5 September 1804 she was renamed Frederick. The Royal Navy disposed of her in December.

== Third Hired armed cutter Lord Nelson ==
This cutter, built in 1803, carried eight 12-pounder carronades and was of 68 54/94 tons (bm). She served from 10 August 1807 until 15 August 1809.

On 20 May, while under the command of Mr. John Wood, Master, she was in company with Princess Caroline off the Vlie when they captured the Dutch privateer schooner Pietheyn. The vessel, whose name was actually Admiral Pietheyer, was five years old and armed with three 12-pounder guns (two bow chasers and one aft), four 8-pounder guns, and a 24-pounder howitzer. She had a crew of 28 men under the command of Lieutenant D. Van Heareskerche. The boats from Princess Caroline captured her without loss of life.

Lord Nelson was wrecked, with no loss of life, near Vlissigen on 15 August 1809. The hired armed cutter Hurd was wrecked with her. Sir Thomas Bourchier, then an Acting Lieutenant, having just passed his exam for Lieutenant, served briefly as Lord Nelson's commanding officer before removing to HMS Forester.
