= HMS Brave =

The following ships of the Royal Navy have been called HMS Brave:

- English ship Brave was a vessel hired by the Crown in 1588.
- HMS Brave (1747) was a xebec captured in 1747 and sold in 1748.
- Hired armed cutter Brave was hired in 1798 and run down by a transport in 1799.
- HMS Brave (1805) was the French 80-gun Tonnant-class ship of the line Formidable, captured at the Battle of Cape Ortegal in 1805, and broken up in 1816.
- HMS Brave was the ex-French 74-gun Brave, captured on 6 February 1806. She foundered on 12 April due to damage she had sustained during her capture at the Battle of San Domingo.
- HMS Brave (1856) was an Albacore-class gunboat built by John Laird, Sons & Company in 1856. She was laid up at Haslar after completion and broken up at Portsmouth in 1869.
- HMS Brave (J305), was an Algerine-class minesweeper commissioned in 1943 and broken up in 1958.
- HMS Brave was to have been the name of the 1944 Colossus-class aircraft carrier subsequently named HMS Warrior.
- HMS Brave (F94), a Type 22 frigate first commissioned in 1986 and expended as a target in August 2004.

== Battle honours ==
- Armada 1588
- Cadiz 1596
- South France 1944
- Kuwait 1991

== See also ==
- HMS Braave (1796)
- The Brave-class patrol boats:
  - HMS Brave Borderer (P1011)
  - HMS Brave Swordsman (P1012)
