= Tyler Zombro =

American baseball player (born 1994)

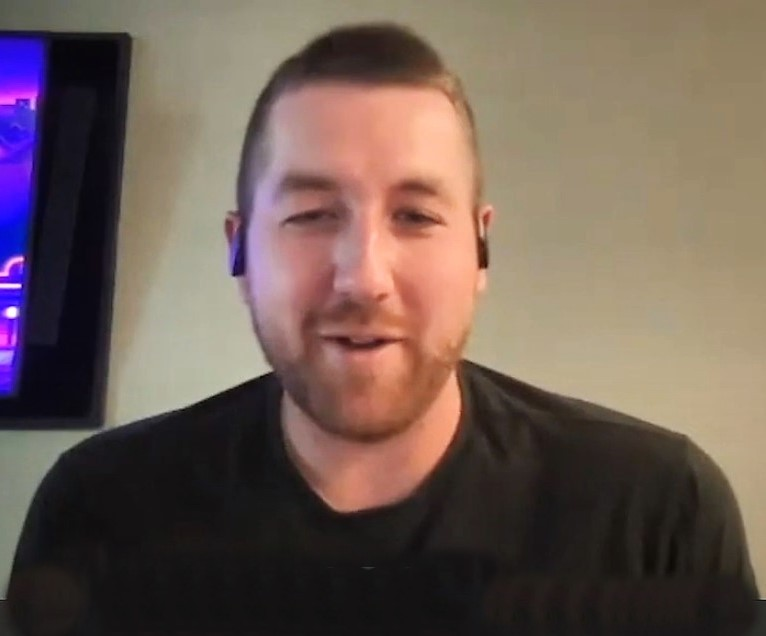
- Zombro interviewed about his injury in 2021
- Pitcher
- Born: September 2, 1994 (age 31); Harrisonburg, Virginia, U.S.
- Bats: Right Throws: Right
- Stats at Baseball Reference

Tyler Zombro (born September 2, 1994) is an American former professional baseball pitcher. He played college baseball for George Mason University before signing with the Tampa Bay Rays as an undrafted free agent in 2017. Zombro survived a seizure and fractured skull sustained when he was hit in the head by a 104-mile-per-hour (167 km/h) line drive during a game in 2021. Zombro retired during the 2024 season.

== Amateur career ==
Zombro attended Robert E. Lee High School in Staunton, Virginia, graduating in 2013. He played for the school's baseball team and had a .505 batting average. He attended George Mason University and played college baseball for the George Mason Patriots as a pitcher. As a freshman, he was named to the Atlantic 10 Conference's all-rookie team. After the season, Zombro played collegiate summer baseball for the Staunton Braves of the Valley Baseball League.

In his sophomore year at George Mason, Zombro had a 7–2 win-loss record and a 4.20 earned run average (ERA). He signed a temporary contract with the Wareham Gatemen of the Cape Cod League in the 2015 summer season, but was released after making two appearances as other contracted players arrived and Wareham needed to stay within the roster limit. Zombro started 14 games in his junior year at George Mason. In his senior year, Zombro had a 6–2 record with a 2.78 ERA in 15 starts and five saves. For his four-year career at George Mason, he had a 3.28 ERA with 226 strikeouts in 318 1/3 innings pitched.

== Professional career ==
=== Tampa Bay Rays ===
Zombro was not selected in the 2017 Major League Baseball draft. Two weeks later, he signed with the Tampa Bay Rays as an undrafted free agent. He made one appearance for the Gulf Coast Rays of the Rookie-level Gulf Coast League and spent the rest of the season with the Princeton Rays of the Rookie-level Appalachian League, making 13 appearances for Princeton. In 2018, Zombro pitched for the Bowling Green Hot Rods of the Single-A Midwest League, and he had an 8–2 record and a 2.84 ERA, paired with 54 strikeouts against eight walks in 76 innings pitched. The Rays had Zombro start the 2019 season with the Montgomery Biscuits of the Double-A Southern League, and was named the league's relief pitcher of the month in June. He had a 2–0 record, a 1.87 ERA, and 11 saves, while striking out 53 and walking seven in 57 2/3 innings for Montgomery, was promoted to the Durham Bulls of the Triple-A International League during the 2019 season. The Rays named Zombro their minor league relief pitcher of the year. The Rays invited Zombro to spring training in 2020 as a non-roster player, but the 2020 season was cancelled due to the COVID-19 pandemic. Zombro received a non-roster invitation to spring training with the Rays in 2021, and he returned to Durham for the 2021 season.

During Durham's game on June 3, 2021, at Durham Bulls Athletic Park, Zombro was pitching against Brett Cumberland of the Norfolk Tides. He threw a 90.6-mile-per-hour (145.8 km/h) sinking fastball, which Cumberland hit. The line drive hit Zombro in the head, above his right ear, at 104 miles per hour (167 km/h). Zombro immediately lost consciousness and fell face-first on the pitcher's mound, as he was having a seizure. Zombro was taken off the field on a stretcher and brought to Duke University Hospital for surgery to repair a skull fracture. Surgeons inserted 16 titanium plates and 36 screws during a 2 1/2-hour operation to repair the temporal bone and reduce intracerebral hemorrhaging and intracranial pressure. The game was suspended and later declared final. Zombro spent four days in the intensive care unit and another two days being monitored before he was discharged from the hospital on June 9. He has no memory of the incident.

After his discharge from the hospital, Zombro underwent physical therapy, speech therapy, and occupational therapy. A CT scan performed in December 2021 showed that the fracture had completely healed, clearing Zombro to return to baseball. Zombro reported to minor league spring training in March 2022. He is wearing protective head gear made from kevlar under his baseball cap, with a small piece that sticks out to cover his zygomatic bone. Zombro threw a batting practice to Rays hitters for the first time since the injury on March 10, pitched an inning in an intrasquad game on March 14, and appeared in a spring training game against the Boston Red Sox on March 22, retiring both batters he faced. The Bulls added him to their active roster on April 21. Zombro appeared in his first game since the injury on April 24, pitching a scoreless inning in relief for Durham against Norfolk. In June, Zombro had surgery to correct thoracic outlet syndrome, ending his 2022 season. Zombro was released by the Rays organization on March 26, 2023.

=== Texas Rangers ===
On May 19, 2023, Zombro signed a minor league contract with the Texas Rangers organization, and was assigned to the Triple-A Round Rock Express. He made two scoreless appearances for the Triple–A Round Rock Express and became a free agent following the season on November 6.

On November 22, 2023, Zombro re-signed with the Rangers on a new minor league contract. He did not appear in a game during the 2024 season, as he was dealing with "consistent nerve issues," and he announced his retirement over social media on August 23, 2024.

== Coaching career ==
On November 18, 2024, the Chicago Cubs hired Zombro to serve as a special assistant within their organization. The Cubs promoted him to vice president of pitching on December 13, 2025.

== Personal life ==
Zombro's wife, Moriah, is a registered nurse. She graduated from Lee High School and James Madison University (JMU), and has worked in travel nursing. Zombro's parents both graduated from Bridgewater College, where his father played baseball and his mother played basketball and volleyball. His grandfather, Melvin "Wimpy" Zombro, played in American Legion Baseball's adult division and continued playing baseball into his 80s.

Zombro got into baseball analytics while he was in college. He started working as a trainer with R&D Baseball Academy in the Washington metropolitan area while he was in college, and converted it into a full-time job while playing professional baseball. Zombro has worked with pitchers from JMU and the University of Virginia, as well as professional players, including Matt Bowman and Sam McWilliams, a teammate with Montgomery. Zombro also works with Tread Athletics, a training facility based in Charlotte, North Carolina.
