= Heidler =

Heidler is a German surname. Notable people with the surname include:

- Betty Heidler (born 1983), German hammer thrower
- Gert Heidler (born 1948), East German footballer and manager

== See also ==
- Heider (surname)
