= Aidar =

Aidar may refer to:

- Aidar (river), in Ukraine and Russia
- Aidar Battalion, a Ukrainian military unit established in 2014
- Aidar, Luhansk Oblast, the pending new name of Novopskov
- Aidar Kazov (born 1995), Kazakh weightlifter
- Carlos Miguel Aidar (born 1946), Brazilian lawyer and sports chairman

== See also ==
- Aydar (disambiguation)
- Haider (disambiguation)
