= Hai Rui (basketball) =

Chinese basketball player (born 1985)

Hai Rui (海瑞; born October 1985), is a professional basketball player from China. Hai formerly played for the Shanghai Sharks as a forward.
