= Aydar, Belgorod Oblast =

Aydar Айдар
- Selo
- Location within Belgorod Oblast Location within Russia
- Coordinates: 50°03′N 38°53′E
- Country: Russia
- Region: Belgorod Oblast
- District: Rovensky District
- Time zone: UTC+3:00

Aydar (Russian: Айдар) is a rural locality (a selo) and the administrative center of Aydarskoye Rural Settlement, Rovensky District, Belgorod Oblast, Russia. The population was 1,183 as of 2010. There are 12 streets.

== Geography ==
Aydar is located 19 km north of Rovenki (the district's administrative centre) by road. Staraya Raygorodka and Fomina are the nearest rural localities.
