= Hyder Ali Leghari =

Pakistani writer and educator

Hyder Ali Leghari also Haider Ali Laghari (Sindhi:حيدر علي لغاري) (11 August 1934 – 25 August 2008) was a writer and educator from Sindh, Pakistan.

== Early life ==
According to the Encyclopedia Sindhiana by Sindhi Language Authority, Hyder Ali was born to Qamber Ali Leghari on 11 August 1934 at a village Tajpur in Matiari Taluka of Matiari District, Sindh.

== Services ==
- Hyder Ali Leghari rendered his services as the best educationist
- He had great knowledge about the poetry of Shah Abdul Latif Bhitai
- He remained the principal of government training school Hyderabad, Sindh
- According to Sindhi newspaper the Affair news, he retired from service in 1994
- Laghari authored two books, Andar Mulch Amulh and Kuchhan Kujaro in the Sindhi language

== Death ==
He died on 25 August 2008.
