= Heydar =

- Gender: Male

Origin
- Meaning: Lion, Brave, Leader
- Region of origin: Iran, Azerbaijan

Other names
- Related names: Gaidar, Haidar

Heydar, meaning Lion, is a common male given name in Greater Iran, particularly in Iran and Azerbaijan. A variant of the Arabic name Haydar (also spelt Heidar, Haider, and other variants), it was a cognomen of Ali, who was known for his courage in battle. Heydar is sometimes transliterated as Gaidar or Geidar, from the Cyrillic spelling Гейдар.

== People ==
- Heydar Aliyev (1923–2003), Azerbaijani politician and president
- Heydar Babayev (born 1957), Azerbaijani politician
- Heydar Ghiai (1922–1985), Iranian architect
- Heydar Huseynov (1908–1950), Azerbaijani philosopher
- Heydar Moslehi (born 1957), Iranian politician
- Heydar Yaghma (1926–1986), Iranian poet

== See also ==
- Heydar Alat, Iran
- Heydar Babaya Salam, a work of poetry
- Heydar Baghi, Iran
- Heydar Didehban, Iran
- Heydar-e Posht-e Shahr, Iran
- Heydar Kar, Iran
- Heydar Kola, Iran
- Heydari (name), an Iranian surname
