= Staunton Braves =

Collegiate summer baseball team in Virginia

Staunton Braves
Founded	1915
Field	Moxie Stadium
Team History	Staunton Braves; Class C Virginia League (1915–1944); Massanutten League (1945–1949); VBL (1950–present)
Division	Southern
Championships	7 (1954) (1957) (1976) (1985) (1995) (1996) (1999)
Runner-Up	8 (1960) (1964) (1969) (1998) (2000) (2004) (2006) (2015)
Owner	Garland Eutsler and Lance Mauck
Manager	George Laase (1st season)

The Staunton Braves are a collegiate summer baseball team in Staunton, Virginia. They play in the southern division of the Valley Baseball League. They have won the pennant in 1993–1995, 1997–2000, 2003, and 2015, ranking as high as the 7th best team in the country during the 2015 regular season. They were league champions in 1995, 1996, and 1999.

The Braves consistently rank towards the top of the league in attendance and play their home games at historic John Moxie Stadium in Gypsy Hill Park. In 2016, Moxie Stadium was listed as the fifth-best Collegiate Wood Bat Park in all of America, in an article on Scout.com.

The Staunton Braves have had over 40 players drafted in the MLB draft.

== Notable players ==
- Aubrey Huff
- Chad Tracy
- Chris Perez
- Jason Michaels
- Luke Scott
- Shawn Camp
- Jon Jay
- Gaby Sánchez
- Will Harris
- Jason Michaels
- Matt Fox
- Tim Sexton
- Mike Maroth
- Joe Koshansky
- Scott Copeland
- Ben Verlander
- Max Povse
- Sam Howard
- Tyler Zombro
