= Hired armed cutter Brave =

History

Great Britain
- Name: Brave
- Commissioned: 29 August 1798
- Fate: Sunk in collision 22 April 1799

General characteristics
- Type: Cutter
- Tons burthen: 13663/94 bm
- Armament: 2 × 4-pounder guns + 10 × 12-pounder carronades

His Majesty's Hired armed cutter Brave served the British Royal Navy from 29 August 1798 until 22 April 1799, when the transport Eclipse ran her down off Beachy Head. Brave is sometimes described as a lugger and sometimes as a cutter.

During her brief service with the Royal Navy Brave′s captain was Lieutenant Gardiner Henry Guion (or John Guion or Guyon or Gunion). On 21 January 1799 Brave captured Jemmy Nosten. Then on 3 March Brave, together with the hired armed cutter Lord Nelson, captured Baron Von Hopkin and Sverige Lycka.

On 22 April (Note: Winfield gives 22 May 1798 as the date of the collision and sinking.) while Brave was escorting a convoy through the English Channel, the transport Eclipse ran her down and sank her. Brave's crew was saved.

On 13 September 1804 prize money for Baron Von Hopkin and Sverige Lycka was paid.
