= Nima Heidari =

Player of the Iranian national hockey team

Personal information
- National team: Iranian national Hockey team
- Born: 21 March 1985 (age 41) Dogonbadan
- Height: 183 cm (6 ft 0 in)
- Weight: 73 kg (161 lb)

Sport
- Country: Iran
- Sport: Field hockey and Indoor hockey
- Club: Gachsaran Oil and Gas Hockey Team; Kohgiluyeh and Boyer Ahmad Road and Transportation Hockey Team; Arak Municipality Hockey Team; Lorestan Municipality Hockey Team; Ilam Azad University Hockey team; modiran khodro naghade hockey team; Marash Baladie Hockey Team
- Team: Iranian national Hockey team

Nima Heidari (Persian: نیما حیدری, born 21 March 1985) is a player of the Iranian national hockey team and the Premier League from Gachsaran.

== Early life ==
Nima Heydari was born on 21 March 1985 in Gachsaran, Iran. He became the Asian champion with the Iranian national hockey team.

== Career ==
He is currently active in the Turkish Hockey Premier League team.

== Honors ==
- Champion and runner-up of 11 Iranian Premier League seasons
- Asian Championship with the national team
