= Reza Heydari =

Iranian footballer

Personal information
- Full name: Reza Heydai
- Date of birth: 25 May 1991 (age 35)
- Place of birth: Iran
- Position: Goalkeeper

Team information
- Current team: Malavan
- Number: 1

Senior career*
Years	Team	Apps	(Gls)
2012–2014	Foolad Yazd	19	(0)
2014–2015	Naft Masjed Soleyman	8	(0)
2015–2016	Fajr Sepasi	14	(0)
2016-2018	Mes Kerman		
2018-2019	khooneh Be Khooneh		
2019-2020	Nirooye Zamini		
2020-2021	Arman Gohar		
2021-	Malavan		
- * Club domestic league appearances and goals

Reza Heydari is a professional goalkeeper who is currently playing for Naft Masjed Soleyman in Persian Gulf Pro League. He was used as the second goalkeeper but recently he was used for the starting goalie. He got a good reputation after a win over Foolad.

== Club career ==
=== Foolad Yazd ===
His debut was a 0–0 with Gahar Zagros as a 19-year-old he got his first professional career Clean Sheet in Azadegan League. He played 19 league games with Foolad Yazd. He left Yazd Foolad in 2014.

=== Naft Masjed Soleyman ===
Starting his career with a 0–2 defeat against Esteghlal taking over Reza Mohammadi. He got the important 3 points for Naft Masjed Soleyman after a great 2–1 victory over Foolad.
