= Ali Haider Noor Khan Niazi =

Pakistani politician

Ali Haider Noor Khan Niazi (Punjabi, Urdu: علی حیدر نور خان نیازی; born 15 December 1978) is a Pakistani politician. He is the member of Punjab Provincial Assembly since the 2008 general elections.

== Education ==
Ali Haider was born in Mianwali on December 15, 1978. He did Master in the Political science from the University of the Punjab, Lahore.

== Political career ==
He had been Naib Nazim of Tehsil council during 2000–01. He was elected in the 2008 general elections on the seat of Provincial Assembly He belongs to the party Muttahida Majlis-e-Amal (MMA). He now belongs to the party Pakistan Muslim League (N). he got re elected again in 2025 bye election from pp87 mianwali with a huge majority securing 67986 votes.
