= Heydari, Tangestan =

Heydari حيدري
- Village
- Location within Iran
- Coordinates: 28°56′07″N 51°16′19″E
- Country: Iran
- Province: Bushehr
- County: Tangestan
- Bakhsh: Central
- Rural District: Ahram

Population (2006)
  - Total: 334
- Time zone: UTC+3:30 (IRST)
  - Summer (DST): UTC+4:30 (IRDT)

Heydari (Persian: حيدري, also Romanized as Ḩeydarī; also known as Heidari Khor Moj) is a village in Ahram Rural District, in the Central District of Tangestan County, Bushehr province, Iran. At the 2006 census, its population was 334, in 84 families.
