= Hajder =

Hajder is a Slavic surname of Arabic origin. Notable people with the surname include:

- Ensar Hajder (born 1991), Bosnian swimmer
- Joško Hajder (1994–2022), Croatian footballer
- Gheorghe Hajder (born 1995), Moldovan government official

== See also ==
- Haider
