= Khaqan Haider Ghazi =

Pakistani poet

Khaqan Haider Ghazi خاقان حیدر غازی
- Born: 28 December 1965 (age 60) Lahore, Punjab, Pakistan
- Occupation: Poet
- Education: MA Punjabi - Arabic and Urdu Literature

Khaqan Haider Ghazi (Urdu: خاقان حیدر غازی) (born December 28, 1965) is a Punjabi poet and working in FM95 Pakistan, Punjab Rung program Nena De Akhay Lagay.

== Background ==
Khaqan Haider Ghazi, Deputy Director Admin of Punjab Institute Of Language Art & Culture, holds a master's degree in Arabic and Urdu Literature and is also a law graduate. Ghazi has published his poetry, mainly in Punjabi. He has also written script of various dramas and Punjabi songs. Ghazi has been associated with FM 103 & FM 95 Punjab Rung and hosting an on-air program "Naina De Aakhay Lage". Now Khaqan is working as Editor "Trinjan", a Punjabi magazine published by PILAC, Lahore. Khaqan wrote one Punjabi movie "Basnati", also wrote lyrics of many Urdu & Punjabi songs. Also wrote and directed a Punjabi Mystic Poetic & Musical Stage play "Kahy Shah Hussain".

== Books ==
- Band Gali Wich Shaam - Punjabi Poetry (1986)
- Same Ka Giyan - Punjabi Poetry (2000)
- Dum Dum Naal Dhamaal - Punjabi Poetry (2006)
- Madhu Naal Salah - Punjabi Poetry (2008)
- Sawan Lae Udeek - Lok Kahani (2010)
- Kahay Hussain - Play (2011)
- Germany Yaatra - Story (2011)
- Mei Chaiter Ni Chakhya - Punjabi Poetry (2013)
- E-Commerce - Educational Book
