= Haydar Haydar =

Traditional mystical Turkish folk song

Haydar Haydar is a well-known traditional mystical Turkish folk song. The lyrics of the song come from "a poem by 17th century Alevi-Bektashi poet Kul Nesîmî that vocalizes an internal struggle with God."

Its writer is unknown but it has been recorded by many musicians like Muhlis Akarsu, Ali Ekber Çiçek, Müslüm Gürses, Arif Sağ and Erdal Erzincan. The song is traditionally performed on a long-necked stringed instrument with bozuk order (duzen) called a saz or bağlama.

The song is associated with the Alevi musical tradition.
