= Darreh Heydar =

Darreh Heydar دره حيدر
- Village
- Location within Iran
- Coordinates: 33°30′04″N 49°41′58″E
- Country: Iran
- Province: Lorestan
- County: Aligudarz
- Bakhsh: Central
- Rural District: Khomeh

Population (2006)
  - Total: 150
- Time zone: UTC+3:30 (IRST)
  - Summer (DST): UTC+4:30 (IRDT)

Darreh Heydar (Persian: دره حيدر, also Romanized as Darreh Ḩeydar, Darreh Heidar, and Darreh-ye Ḩeydar) is a village in Khomeh Rural District, in the Central District of Aligudarz County, Lorestan Province, Iran. At the 2006 census, its population was 150, in 34 families.
