= Heydari, Hormozgan =

Heydari حيدري
- Village
- Location within Iran
- Coordinates: 27°36′55″N 57°05′19″E
- Country: Iran
- Province: Hormozgan
- County: Rudan
- Bakhsh: Central
- Rural District: Rahdar

Population (2006)
  - Total: 13
- Time zone: UTC+3:30 (IRST)
  - Summer (DST): UTC+4:30 (IRDT)

Heydari (Persian: حيدري, also Romanized as Ḩeydarī) is a village in Rahdar Rural District, in the Central District of Rudan County, Hormozgan province, Iran. At the 2006 census, its population was 13, in 4 families.
