= Haidar Salim =

Afghan singer

Haidar Salim حيدر سليم
- Born: Afghanistan
- Genres: Pop; Hindi Song Renditions; Ghazals
- Occupation: Singer
- Years active: 1970–present
- Label: Various

Haidar Salim (Pashto/Dari: حيدر سليم) is an Afghan singer who resides in Dublin, California. He gained popularity in the 1970s and has maintained popularity throughout the decades.

== Popular CD's ==
- Sorood-e Kabul
- Pay- Ashk
- Taqdeer
- Sapidah
- Dukhtar-e Afghan
- Nawa-e Dil
- Majlisi Awal
- Maykadah
- Majlisi Dawoom

== Popular songs performed in concerts ==
- Salma
- Mastee
- Kabul
- Zeba
