= Novoalexandrovka, Rovensky District, Belgorod Oblast =

Novoalexandrovka Новоалександровка
- Selo
- Location within Belgorod Oblast Location within Russia
- Coordinates: 50°09′N 38°53′E
- Country: Russia
- Region: Belgorod Oblast
- District: Rovensky District
- Time zone: UTC+3:00

Novoalexandrovka (Russian: Новоалександровка) is a rural locality (a selo) and the administrative center of Novoalexandrovskoye Rural Settlement, Rovensky District, Belgorod Oblast, Russia. The population was 1,183 as of 2010. There are 6 streets.

== Geography ==
Novoalexandrovka is located 32 km north of Rovenki (the district's administrative centre) by road. Rovny is the nearest rural locality.
