= Holly Hyder =

Australian cricketer (born 1988)

Personal information
- Full name: Holly Bryce Hyder
- Born: 13 March 1988 (age 38)
- Batting: Right-handed
- Bowling: Right-arm fast-medium
- Role: Bowler

Domestic team information
- Years: Team
- 2004/05–2008/09: Western Australia

Career statistics
Competition	WLA	WT20
Matches	11	2
Runs scored	11	–
Batting average	11.00	–
100s/50s	0/0	–
Top score	4*	–
Balls bowled	169	–
Wickets	4	–
Bowling average	54.25	–
5 wickets in innings	0	–
10 wickets in match	0	–
Best bowling	2/41	–
Catches/stumpings	3/–	1/–
- Source: CricketArchive, 7 July 2021

Holly Bryce Hyder (born 13 March 1988) is a former Australian cricketer. A right-arm fast-medium bowler, she represented Western Australia in 11 List A matches in the Women's National Cricket League (WNCL) between the 2004–05 and 2008–09 seasons. She also made two appearances for Western Australia in the Australian Women's Twenty20 Cup.
