= Gaidar, Iran =

Gaidar گائيدر
- Village
- Location within Iran
- Coordinates: 35°05′09″N 47°09′45″E
- Country: Iran
- Province: Kurdistan
- County: Kamyaran
- Bakhsh: Muchesh
- Rural District: Amirabad

Population (2006)
  - Total: 105
- Time zone: UTC+3:30 (IRST)
  - Summer (DST): UTC+4:30 (IRDT)

Gaidar (Persian: گائيدر, also Romanized as Gā’īdar; also known as Gāhīdar, Gāh-i-Yār, and Kāhī Yār) is a village in Amirabad Rural District, Muchesh District, Kamyaran County, Kurdistan Province, Iran. At the 2006 census, its population was 105, in 31 families. The village is populated by Kurds.
