= French ship Brave =

A number of ships of the French Navy have borne the name Brave. Among them:

- Prince (1668), a 48-gun ship of the line, was named Brave during part of her career.
- Brave (1671), a galley
- Reine (1671), a 48-gun ship of the line, was named Brave during part of her career.
- Brave (1672), a 56-gun ship of the line
- Brave (1675), a 50-gun ship of the line
- Triomphant (1675), a 74-gun ship of the line, was named Brave during part of her career.
- Brave (1679), a galley
- Brave (1683), a 60-gun ship of the line
- Brave (1687), a galley
- Brave (1726), an ordinary galley
- Brave (1746), an ordinary galley
- Duc de Bourgogne (1751), an 80-gun ship of the line, was named Brave during part of her career.
- Brave (1762), a gunboat
- Brave (1781), a 74-gun ship of the line
- Brave (1793), a brig, was renamed Arrogante; the Royal Navy captured her in 1798 and she became HMS Arrogante and then HMS Insolent. She was sold in 1818.
- Cassard (1795), a Téméraire-class ship of the line, was named Brave and Dix-août during part of her career.

== Ships with related names ==
- Citoyen (1793), a xebec, was named Brave sans culotte during part of her career.
- Bravoure (1795), a 40-gun Cocarde-class frigate.

== Sources and references ==
- Roche, Jean-Michel (2005). Dictionnaire des bâtiments de la flotte de guerre française de Colbert à nos jours, 1671 - 1870. Group Retozel-Maury Millau. pp. 83–84. ISBN 978-2-9525917-0-6. OCLC 165892922.
