= Joseph Hyder =

Joseph Silver Hyder (died 1932) was secretary to the Land Nationalisation Society in Britain.

Alfred Russel Wallace wrote an introduction to Hyder's work The Case for Land Nationalisation (1914, London: Simpkin, Marshall, Hamilton, Kent and co.), and Hyder was one of the small gathering who attended Wallace's funeral in 1913.

Hyder stood as a Progressive Party candidate at Strand in the 1904 London County Council election.

== Publications ==
- Land Problems
- Public Property in Land
- State Land Purchase without Loan or Tax
- The Curse of Landlordism
- The Case for Land Nationalisation
