= Golikov =

Golikov (Russian: Голиков) is a Russian masculine surname, its feminine counterpart is Golikova. It may refer to

- Aleksandr Golikov (born 1952), Russian-Soviet ice hockey player
- Aleksandr Golikov (hydrobiologist) (1931–2010), Russian malacologist
- Angelina Golikova (born 1991), Russian speed skater
- Arkady Gaidar, pen name of Soviet writer Arkady Golikov (1904–1941)
- Filipp Golikov (1900–1980), Russian-Soviet military commander
- Mikhail Golikov (born 1969), Russian football player
- Tatyana Golikova (born 1966), Russian economist
- Vladimir Golikov (born 1954), Russian-Soviet ice hockey player
