= Markus Haider =

Austrian singer

- Also known as: Michael Mende
- Born: 1974 July 23; Vienna
- Origin: Zwölfaxing, Austria
- Genres: Traditional pop; easy listening
- Occupation: Singer
- Instrument: Vocals
- Website: www.gangguys.net

Markus Haider is an Austrian singer part of The Gang Guys, who dub themselves "the Austrian Rat Pack", a tribute band to the original Rat Pack. He is known for his performance of Dean Martin's Sway that is commonly but mistakenly thought to be performed by Frank Sinatra.

Haider's cover of Sway was a part of a tribute show to the Rat Pack performed at Entropolos Theatre, it is believed that the date of the performance is somewhere around 2009. The black-and-white hue of the video was later added to the video by Niki Lappas - the band's editor - giving the performance a more dated look, resulting in confusion as to the date of the performance and the identity of the performer is, with many uploaders mistakenly classifying it as a Frank Sinatra performance, despite there being no known Sinatra performance of the song. The cacophonous audience featured in the video was spliced from a Beatles performance on February 9, 1964.

== Career ==
In 2011, Haider tried a Schlager project and released a CD titled "Auftritt"; he used the artist name "Michael Mende" in this project. Even though the CD was not ready to be produced by that date, the singer's producer Johnny Matrix submitted a track called "Bella scusami" to the Alpen Grand Prix in Italy, in which he won 2nd place. The track was available on Belgian National Radio for eight weeks. Schlager-Charts with highest ranking on #19.

== As an actor ==
Markus Haider also appears as an actor in several movies. Nicolas Neuhold“ is a close friend of Haider's, and, together, they made a project called „Cannes - through the eyes of the hunter“, which was Neuhold's final assignment. This short film was nominated for the Students Television Awards 2000 by the Royal Television Society.
