= Haydari Tabrizi =

Haydari Tabrizi (Persian: حیدری تبریزی; died 1592/1594) was a poet in Safavid Iran and the Mughal Empire. Over 9,000 verses of odes, sonnets, fragments, and quatrains are included in Haydari's Persian kulliyyat (collection of poetry), which is kept at the Iranian Majlis library.

== Sources ==
- Shamsoddini, Payam (2023). "Ḥaydarī Tabrīzī". In Madelung, Wilferd; Daftary, Farhad (eds.). Encyclopaedia Islamica Online. Brill Online. ISSN 1875-9831.
