= Hadi Heidari =

Iranian cartoonist

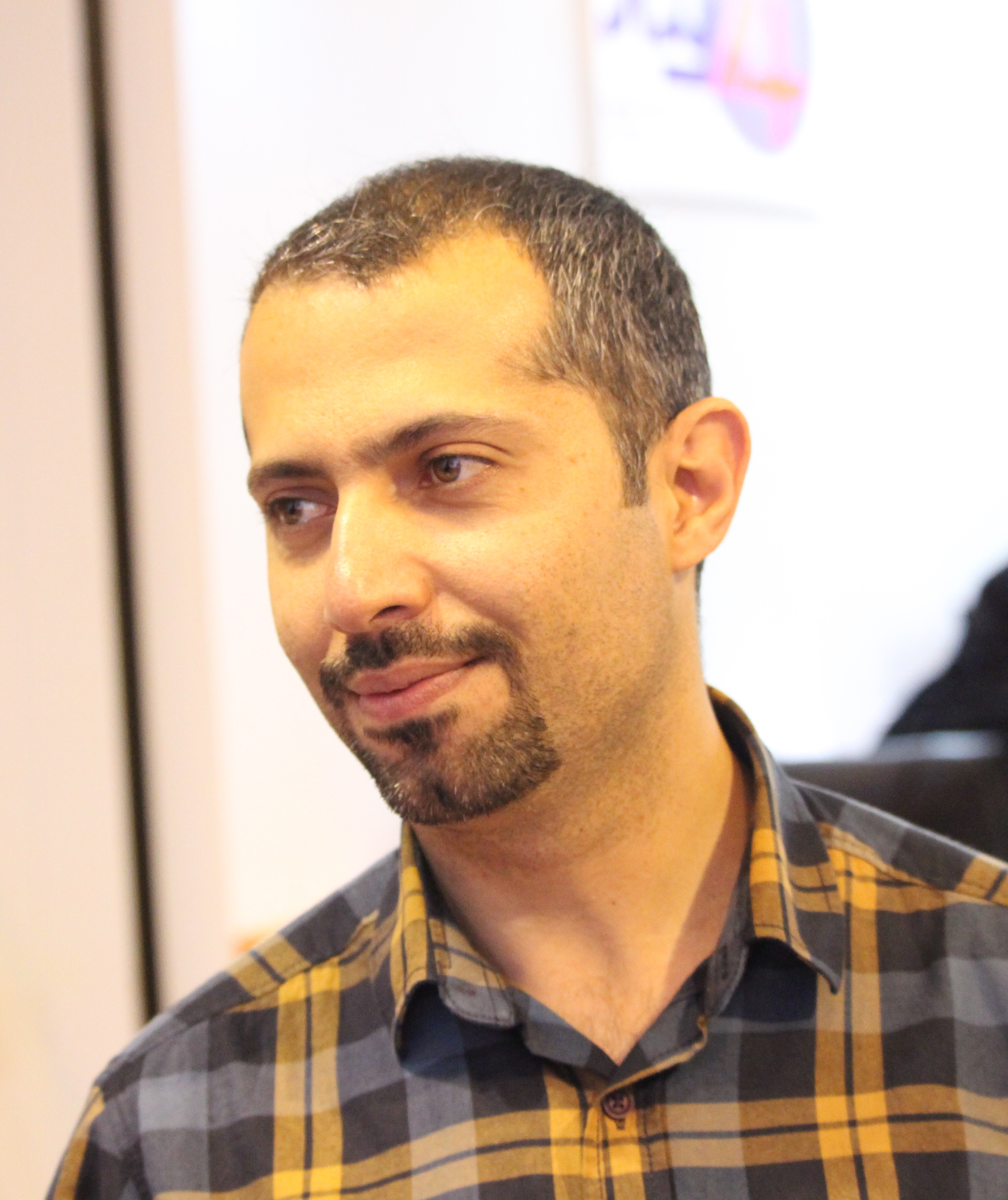
- Hadi Heydari

Hadi Heidari is a press cartoonist in Tehran, Iran, whose work has appeared in reformist newspapers including Shargh, Norooz and Neshat. He is 39, and has a degree in painting from Tehran's Arts and Architecture University. Heidari was imprisoned in 2015 for a cartoon that offended members of the government.

== Arrests and imprisonments ==
The Blindfolded Men by Hadi Heidari

In 2009 Heidari was jailed for several weeks during a crackdown following the disputed re-election of President Mahmud Ahmadinejad In addition to imprisonment in 2009, he had been arrested in 2010 and 2012.

One commentator suggests that in the Muslim world, political cartoons offer a reliable way to get a point across to people who can't read. The US-based Committee to Protect Journalists rates Iran as the fourth most-censored country in the world, and a number of journalists remain in prison.

Heidari was imprisoned in 2015 while working at The Shahrvand, a daily newspaper owned by Iran's Red Crescent Society, the equivalent of the Red Cross. He was sent to Tehran’s Evin Prison to complete a suspended one-year jail sentence imposed in 2013 for his "Blindfold" cartoon, which had been published in the Shargh; leading to a three-month shutdown of that publication.

The Revolutionary Guards had filed a suit against Heidari for his cartoon, which showed a lineup of people, each tying a black blindfold on the next person in line. The cartoon had no caption, leading to several different interpretations. Several politicians alleged that the cartoon had been intentionally released during the week of Holy Defence (a term referring to the eight-year Iran-Iraq war of the 1980s). According to the politicians, the blindfolds "reflected the black headband worn by Iranian soldiers – and suggested that the soldiers went to war blindly", and that the cartoon offended veterans of that war.

== Cartoon responding to Paris terror attacks ==
Heidari's cartoon responding to the 2015 terrorist attacks in Paris

Shortly before his 2015 arrest, Heidari had gained international attention with another cartoon, which depicted the Eiffel Tower in tearful solidarity with the people of France over the attacks on Paris by Islamic State in 2015. Heidari was imprisoned shortly after his Paris cartoon was published.

== 2015 release ==
On 26 April 2016, Heidari announced his release, thanking his supporters and posting an image on Instagram of a dove being freed from its cage.
