= Hyder (name) =

Hyder is a name, used as both a given name and surname. It may be an Urdu variant spelling of the Arabic name Haydar.

People with this name include:

== Given name ==
- Hyder Akbar (born 1984), American writer and entrepreneur in Afghanistan
- Hyder Ali (1721–1782), sultan and de facto ruler of the Kingdom of Mysore in southern India
- Hyder Ali (Indian cricketer) (1943–2022)
- Hyder Ali Leghari, (1934–2008), Pakistani writer and teacher
- Hyder Bilgrami, Indian film director
- Hyder Husyn (born 1963), Bangladeshi singer-songwriter
- Hyder Bux Jatoi (1901–1970), revolutionary peasant leader in Sindh, Pakistan
- Hyder Edward Rollins (1889–1958), American scholar
- Hyder Shah (fl.1870), secret agent, member of the British Indian Army

== Middle name ==
- Ghulam Hyder Samejo, Pakistani politician, member of the National Assembly of Pakistan from 2002 to 2013
- Ghullam Hyder Mehjoor Solangi (born 1941), Sindhi historian
- Shezada Hyder Ali, grandson of Hyder Ali

== Surname ==
- Adnan Hyder, Pakistan-born American academic
- Bushra Hyder, Pakistani schoolteacher and peace activist
- Charles Hyder, (1930–2004), American astrophysicist
- Gaylon Hyder (born1974), former American football player
- Jamie Gray Hyder (born 1985), American actress
- John Hyder (1912–2003), American college basketball coach
- Joseph Hyder (died 1932), secretary to the Land Nationalisation Society, UK
- Holly Hyder (born 1988), former Australian cricketer
- Ken Hyder (born 1946), Scottish jazz fusion drummer
- Kerry Hyder (born 1991), American football player
- Liz Hyder, English author
- Lodhi Karim Hyder (1890–1953), Indian economist and politician
- Martin Hyder (born 1961), English actor and writer
- Pulikkottil Hyder (1879–?), Indian poet
- Qurratulain Hyder (1927–2007), novelist

== See also ==
- Hyder (disambiguation)
