= Kamal Haydar =

Yemeni writer (1933–1980)

Kamal Haydar (1933–1980) was a short story writer from southern Yemen. He was noted for his stories that dealt with social issues in Yemen. He published a collection of his short stories, Signpost (1978), only two years before his death. One of his stories, "A Man of No Consequence", was translated into English by Olive Kenny and Thomas Ezzy and appeared in a 1988 anthology of modern Arabian literature.
