= Kamran Heidari =

Iranian documentary film director (born 1979)

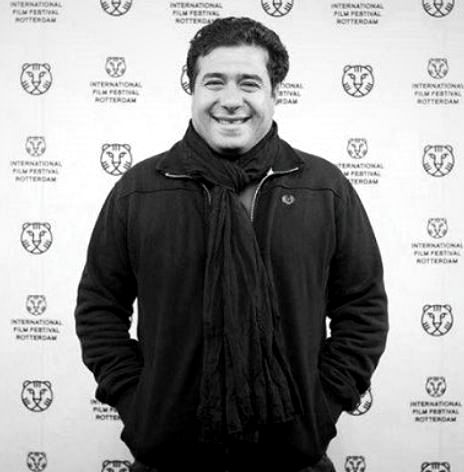
- Born: August 23, 1979 (age 47); Gachsaran
- Occupations: filmmaker, director, screenwriter, cinematographer, photographer
- Years active: 2004–present
- Website: kamranheidari.com

Kamran Heidari (born August 23, 1979) is an Iranian documentary filmmaker, photographer, and writer. He is most known for his Docufictions about the music of the south of Iran. RogerEbert.com considers him as one of the most accomplished documentary filmmakers currently working.

== Life ==
He was born in the south of Iran in Gachsaran, the oil city. His ancestors are from a nomadic tribe called the Qashqai who raise livestock in the plains of southern Iran.

His father was an employee of the oil company of the city, and when he was just a little boy, he saw many movies in the cinema of the oil company, which made him interested in cinema.

== Career ==
He made his first short documentary film in the old context of Shiraz (one-man filmmaking style) which is about the life of a mythical character (Dash Akol), after that he was made his the first long documentary film "I am negahdar jamali and I make western" this film was interested by "Abbas Kiarostami" and It was introduced by him to the international festivals of Pusan and Rotterdam. After that his other films have been shown on Arte TV in France and international documentary film festivals IDFA, Leipzig and other festivals. He is very interested in the anthropology of music and has made several documentary films about the music of southern Iran, also in recent years he has been most active researcher and anthropology of music (documentary film) in the south of Iran.

== Filmography ==
- 2004: Dash Akol (Documentary, 18 mins)
- 2006: Mohammad Bahman Beigi (Documentary, 40 mins)
- 2006: The Big Red (Short film, 14 mins)
- 2007: Comfortably Numb (Feature, 85 mins)
- 2008: At the End of a Perfect Day (Documentary, 50 mins)
- 2010: The Dead Sea (Documentary, 30 mins)
- 2011: Mola Sadra (Documentary, 30 mins)
- 2012: My name is Negahdar Jamali and I make Westerns (Documentary, 65 mins)
- 2014: Dingomaro – Iran's Black South (Documentary, 75 mins)
- 2017: Ali Agha (Documentary, 80 mins)
- 2019: None of your business (Documentary, 64 mins)
