= Aidar (river) =

River in Russia and Ukraine

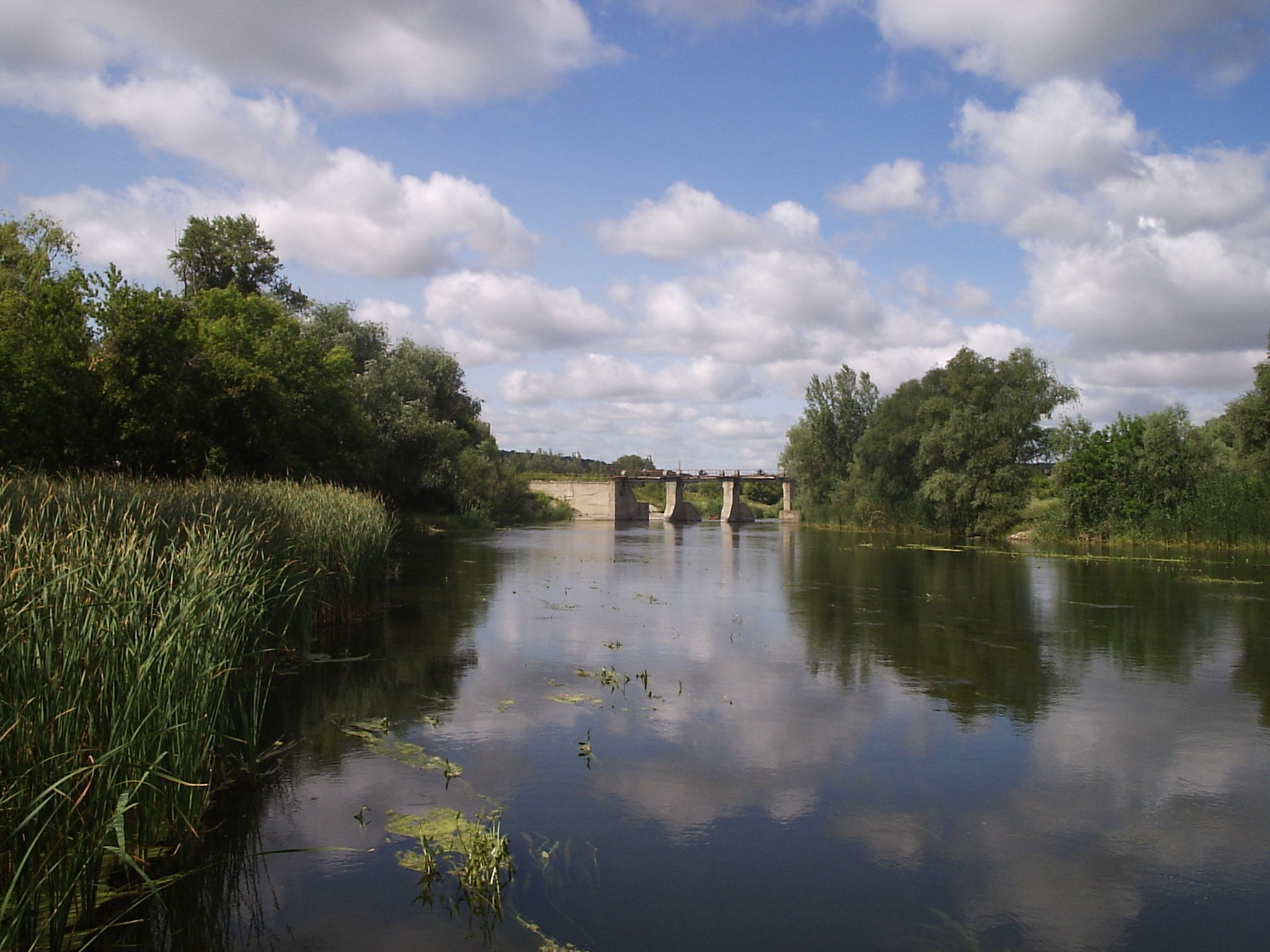
- Native name: Айдар (Ukrainian)

Location
- Country: Russia, Ukraine

Physical characteristics
- Mouth: Donets
  - coordinates: 48°42′27″N 39°11′48″E
- Length: 264 km (164 mi)
- Basin size: 7,420 km^{2} (2,860 sq mi)

Basin features
- Progression: Donets→ Don→ Sea of Azov

The Aidar (Russian and Ukrainian: Айдар) is a river in Luhansk Oblast, Ukraine and Belgorod Oblast, Russia. A left tributary of the Seversky Donets, it is 264 km (164 mi) long (with 256 km (159 mi) located within Ukraine) and has a basin area of 7,420 square kilometres (2,860 sq mi). The slopes of the valley are partitioned with ravines and gorges. In the spring, snow melt accounts for approximately 70% of the flow. The average flow module is 1.7 litres / sec / km². The river freezes in December.

The Aidar Battalion in the Ukrainian Armed Forces is named after this river.
