= Qaleh-ye Heydar, Bushehr =

Qaleh-ye Heydar قلعه حيدر
- Village
- Location within Iran
- Coordinates: 29°38′13″N 50°27′26″E
- Country: Iran
- Province: Bushehr
- County: Ganaveh
- Bakhsh: Central
- Rural District: Hayat Davud

Population (2006)
  - Total: 287
- Time zone: UTC+3:30 (IRST)
  - Summer (DST): UTC+4:30 (IRDT)

Qaleh-ye Heydar (Persian: قلعه حيدر, also Romanized as Qal‘eh-ye Ḩeydar; also known as Derow, Ghal‘eh Gha‘ed Heidar, Qā’ed Ḩeydarī, Qal‘eh-e-Ḩājī Heydar, Qal‘eh Qāid Haidar, Qal‘eh-ye Ḩājjī Ḩeydar, and Qal‘eh-ye Qāyed Ḩeydar) is a village in Hayat Davud Rural District, in the Central District of Ganaveh County, Bushehr Province, Iran. At the 2006 census, its population was 287, in 70 families.
