= Gaidar (surname) =

Gaidar (Russian: Гайда́р) is a Russian surname. It was originally a pen name of Russian writer Arkady Gaidar (1904–1941) and was taken as their last name by his descendants. His son, Timur Gaidar, published two versions of the pseudonym's origin:

1. Arkady took the name Gaidar from a Khakas-language word meaning going first, the leader.
2. The name represents an abbreviation of French "Golikov Arkadi d'Arzamas", which means "Golikov, Arkadi from Arzamas".

The surname may also refer to:

- Maria Gaidar (born 1982), Russian activist, daughter of Yegor
- Timur Gaidar (1926–1999), Soviet admiral, son of Arkady
- Yegor Gaidar (1956–2009), acting Prime Minister of Russia, son of Timur

== See also ==
- Heydar, an Iranian given name, sometimes transliterated as Gaidar
- Golikov, Arkady Gaidar's original surname
