= Heider (surname) =

Heider is a German surname. It may be a habitation name for someone living on a heath, or a reference to a place-name with similar ultimate meaning. It is a variation of Haider. Notable people with the surname include:

- Fritz Heider (1896–1988), Austrian psychologist
- Karl G. Heider (born 1935), American anthropologist
- Karl Heider (zoologist) (1856–1935), Austrian zoologist and embryologist
- Lee Heider (born 1947), American politician
- Marc Heider (born 1986), American-born German footballer
- Matthias Heider (born 1966), German politician
- Moriz Heider (1816–1866), Austrian dentist
- Paul Heider (1868–1936), Grand Master of the Teutonic Order
- Robert R. Heider (1928–2015), American politician
- Wally Heider (1923–1989), American audio engineer

== See also ==
- Haider (surname)
