= Hydari (surname) =

Hydari (Urdu: حیدری) or Hyderi is a surname among Muslims of the Middle East and South Asia. It is derived from 'Hyder' (Arabic: حَـيـدر, an epithet of 'Lion'), which was a title of Ali. Notable people with the surname include:

- Aditi Rao Hydari (born 1986), Indian actress
- Akbar Hydari (1869–1941), Indian politician
- Ali Sher Hyderi (c. 1963–2009), Pakistani politician
- Amina Hydari (1878–1939), Indian social worker
- Muhammad Saleh Akbar Hydari (1894–1948), Indian civil servant and politician
- Shamsher-ul-Hyderi (1931–2012), Sindhi poet from Pakistan

== See also ==
- Lions in Islam
- Haidari, a suburb of Athens, Greece
- Haydari, salty yoghurt dish served as an appetiser
- Hyder (name)
- Heydari (name)
- Haider (surname)
- Hyderi, a neighbourhood in Karachi, Pakistan
