= National Register of Historic Places listings in Shenandoah County, Virginia =

Location of Shenandoah County in Virginia

This is a list of the National Register of Historic Places listings in Shenandoah County, Virginia.

This is intended to be a complete list of the properties and districts on the National Register of Historic Places in Shenandoah County, Virginia, United States. The locations of National Register properties and districts for which the latitude and longitude coordinates are included below, may be seen in an online map.

There are 41 properties and districts listed on the National Register in the county, including 1 National Historic Landmark.

This National Park Service list is complete through NPS recent listings posted August 28, 2026.

== Current listings ==
	Name on the Register	Image	Date listed	Location	City or town	Description
1	Bauserman Farm	Bauserman Farm	December 27, 2010 (#10001064)	10107 S. Middle Rd. 38°46′44″N 78°39′04″W	Mount Jackson	
2	Abraham Beydler House	Abraham Beydler House	February 7, 2002 (#01001568)	2748 Zion Church Rd. 38°54′37″N 78°25′42″W	Maurertown	
3	Jacob Bowman House	Jacob Bowman House	February 21, 2017 (#100000679)	2470 Polk Rd. 38°48′49″N 78°36′34″W	Edinburg	
4	Bowman–Zirkle Farm	Bowman–Zirkle Farm	August 21, 2009 (#09000642)	12097 S. Middle Rd. 38°47′56″N 78°37′33″W	Edinburg	
5	Burner-Gearing Farm	Burner-Gearing Farm	June 1, 2021 (#100006573)	2497 Moose Rd. 38°52′53″N 78°27′27″W	Woodstock vicinity	
6	Campbell Farm	Campbell Farm	August 15, 1990 (#90001416)	Stoney Creek Rd., near Lantz Mills; 38°50′34″N 78°35′34″W	Edinburg	
7	Cedar Creek Battlefield and Belle Grove	Cedar Creek Battlefield and Belle Grove	August 11, 1969 (#69000243)	On Interstate 81 between Middletown and Strasburg; 38°59′15″N 78°19′24″W	Middletown	Site of the Battle of Cedar Creek; designated a National Historic Landmark District in 1969. Extends into Frederick County.
8	Clem–Kagey Farm	Clem–Kagey Farm	August 20, 2009 (#09000643)	291 Belgravia Rd. 38°47′44″N 78°37′22″W	Edinburg	
9	Edinburg Historic District	Edinburg Historic District	July 22, 1998 (#98000845)	Roughly along Stony Creek Boulevard and Shenandoah and Railroad Aves. 38°49′20″N 78°33′52″W	Edinburg	
10	Edinburg Mill	Edinburg Mill	September 7, 1979 (#79003084)	U.S. Route 11; 38°49′16″N 78°34′06″W	Edinburg	
11	Forestville Historic District	Forestville Historic District	November 30, 2011 (#11000874)	Junction of State Route 42 with Middle and Quicksburg Rds. 38°42′55″N 78°43′23″W	Forestville	
12	Fort Bowman	Fort Bowman	November 25, 1969 (#69000279)	Fort Bowman Rd. 39°00′10″N 78°19′31″W	Middletown	
13	Funkhouser Farm	Funkhouser Farm	June 4, 2018 (#100002533)	27812 Old Valley Pike; 38°57′24″N 78°25′18″W	Toms Brook	
14	Dr. Christian Hockman House	Dr. Christian Hockman House	February 23, 1984 (#84003593)	U.S. Route 11; 38°49′45″N 78°33′04″W	Edinburg	
15	Hupp House	Hupp House	February 21, 1997 (#97000155)	551 N. Massanutten St. 38°59′43″N 78°21′20″W	Strasburg	
16	Lantz Hall	Lantz Hall	December 30, 1992 (#92001711)	614 S. Main St. (U.S. Route 11); 38°52′33″N 78°30′39″W	Woodstock	
17	Lantz Mill	Lantz Mill	November 1, 2007 (#07001145)	95 Swover Creek Rd. 38°50′26″N 78°35′43″W	Edinburg	
18	John Miley Maphis House	John Miley Maphis House	November 22, 2011 (#11000840)	56 Bell's Ln. 38°50′21″N 78°35′52″W	Edinburg	
19	Meems Bottom Covered Bridge	Meems Bottom Covered Bridge	June 10, 1975 (#75002037)	South of Mt. Jackson on Wissler Rd. over the North Fork of the Shenandoah River; 38°43′15″N 78°39′19″W	Mount Jackson	
20	J.W.R. Moore House	J.W.R. Moore House	November 16, 2005 (#05001275)	5588 Main St. 38°45′11″N 78°38′01″W	Mount Jackson	
21	Mount Jackson Colored Cemetery	Mount Jackson Colored Cemetery	March 9, 2026 (#100012794)	225 Nelson Street; 38°45′21″N 78°38′07″W	Mount Jackson	
22	Mount Jackson Historic District	Mount Jackson Historic District	June 17, 1993 (#93000541)	Main, King, Gospel, Broad, Bridge, Race, Clifford, Tisinger, and Wunder Sts., and Orkney Dr. 38°44′44″N 78°38′35″W	Mount Jackson	
23	Mount Pleasant	Mount Pleasant	August 18, 2011 (#11000553)	292 Hite Ln. 39°00′02″N 78°20′04″W	Strasburg	
24	Daniel Munch House	Daniel Munch House	March 13, 2002 (#02000181)	2588 Seven Fountains Rd. 38°51′15″N 78°24′01″W	Fort Valley	
25	New Market Battlefield Park	New Market Battlefield Park	September 15, 1970 (#70000824)	North of the junction of U.S. Routes 11 and 211; 38°39′58″N 78°40′06″W	New Market	
26	New Market Historic District	New Market Historic District	September 22, 1972 (#72001416)	Junction of U.S. Routes 11 and 211; 38°38′49″N 78°40′20″W	New Market	
27	Orkney Springs Hotel	Orkney Springs Hotel	April 22, 1976 (#76002119)	State Route 263 west of its junction with Orkney Springs Rd. 38°47′41″N 78°48′56″W	Orkney Springs	
28	Shenandoah County Courthouse	Shenandoah County Courthouse	June 19, 1973 (#73002060)	W. Court and S. Main Sts. 38°52′56″N 78°30′20″W	Woodstock	
29	Shenandoah County Farm	Shenandoah County Farm	October 29, 1993 (#93001122)	Northern side of Zion Church Rd., 4,000 feet (1,200 m) east of the junction with U.S. Route 11; 38°55′54″N 78°27′01″W	Maurertown	
30	Shenvalee Golf Resort	Shenvalee Golf Resort	August 18, 2023 (#100009244)	9660 Fairway Dr. 38°38′25″N 78°40′28″W	New Market	
31	Snapp House	Snapp House	May 7, 1979 (#79003085)	Southwest of Fishers Hill on Copp Rd. 38°58′22″N 78°25′29″W	Fishers Hill	
32	Stoner-Keller House and Mill	Stoner-Keller House and Mill	February 5, 2013 (#12001269)	2900 Battlefield Rd. 38°59′10″N 78°23′58″W	Strasburg	
33	Strasburg Historic District	Strasburg Historic District	August 16, 1984 (#84003595)	Roughly bounded by railroad tracks and 3rd, High, and Massanutten Sts. 38°59′20″N 78°21′54″W	Strasburg	
34	Strasburg Stone and Earthenware Manufacturing Company	Strasburg Stone and Earthenware Manufacturing Company	June 19, 1979 (#79003086)	E. King St. 38°59′14″N 78°21′21″W	Strasburg	
35	Toms Brook School	Toms Brook School	August 18, 2011 (#11000554)	3232 S. Main St. 38°56′37″N 78°26′36″W	Toms Brook	
36	Triplett High and Graded School		April 2, 2025 (#100011606)	6044 Main Street; 38°44′35″N 78°38′32″W	Mount Jackson	
37	Benjamin Wierman House	Benjamin Wierman House	February 21, 2008 (#08000077)	4049 Flat Rock Rd. 38°42′57″N 78°45′27″W	Quicksburg	
38	Wilkins Farm	Wilkins Farm	February 10, 2014 (#13001175)	989 Swover Creek Rd. 38°50′23″N 78°36′34″W	Edinburg	
39	Wine House	Wine House	January 16, 2026 (#100012562)	2051 Quicksburg Road; 38°42′13″N 78°41′36″W	Quicksburg	
40	Woodstock Historic District	Woodstock Historic District	October 25, 1995 (#95001089)	Roughly bounded by N. Main, E. North, and Water Sts., Cemetery Rd., and the Norfolk Southern railroad tracks 38°52′55″N 78°30′19″W	Woodstock	
41	Zirkle Mill	Zirkle Mill	February 10, 1983 (#83003316)	West of Quicksburg on State Route 42; 38°42′50″N 78°43′20″W	Quicksburg	

== See also ==
- List of National Historic Landmarks in Virginia
- National Register of Historic Places listings in Virginia
