= Woodstock Historic District =

Historic district in Virginia, United States

- U.S. National Register of Historic Places
- U.S. Historic district
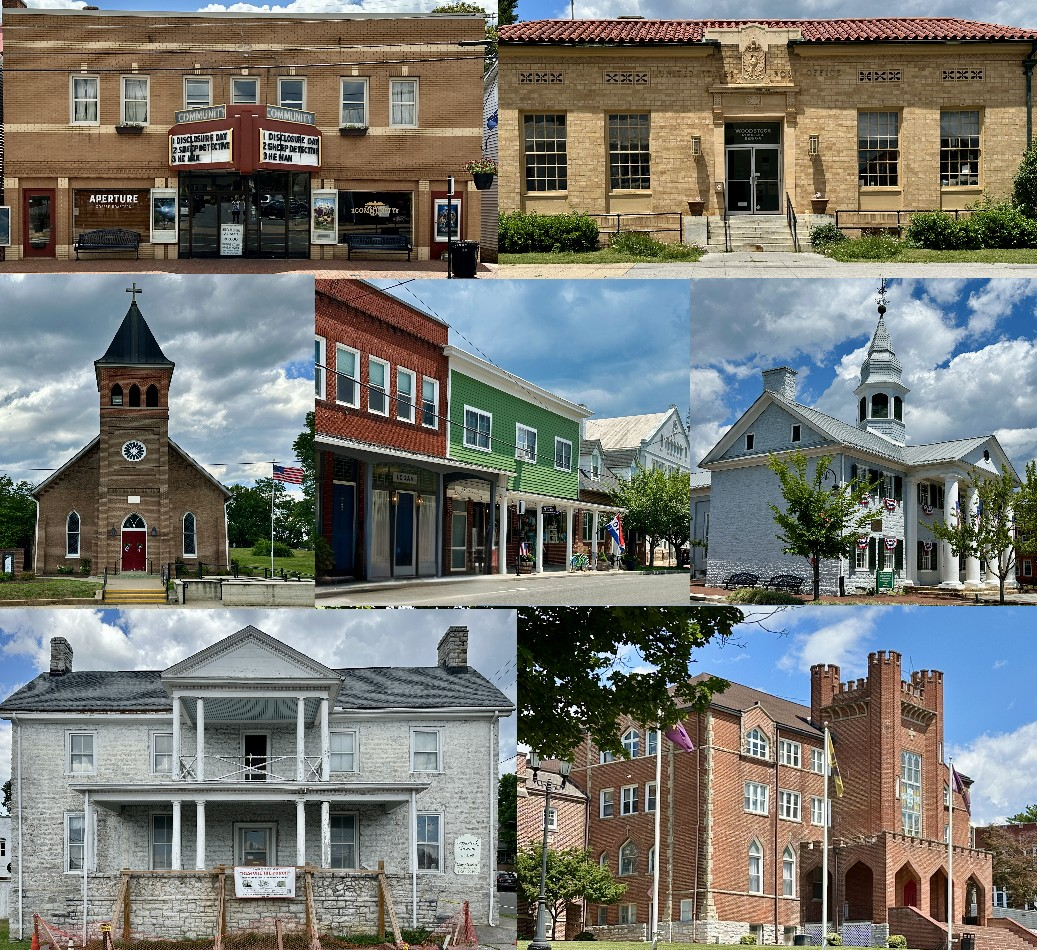
- (from left to right) Woodstock Community Theatre (c. 1930), Woodstock Post Office (c. 1931), Emanuel Lutheran Church (c. 1884), Buildings on West Court Street, Old Shenandoah County Courthouse (c. 1790), Woodstock Museum of Shenandoah County Virginia (c. late-18th century), Lantz Hall, (c. 1909)

- Location within Virginia Location within the United States
- Location: Roughly bounded by N. Main, E. North and Water Sts., Cemetery Rd. and the Southern RR tracks, Woodstock, Virginia
- Coordinates: 38°52′55″N 78°30′19″W
- Area: 180 acres (73 ha)
- Built: 1761
- Architectural style: Italianate, Greek Revival, Federal
- NRHP reference No.: 95001089
- Added to NRHP: October 25, 1995

The Woodstock Historic District encompasses most of the historic center of Woodstock, Virginia. Founded in 1761, it is the oldest community in Shenandoah County, which is reflected in its architecture. The historic district is organized around three major north–south axes: Main Street (Virginia State Route 11), Water Street, and the right-of-way of the Norfolk and Southern Railway. It includes some of the best examples of residential architecture in the town from its founding into the early 20th century, as well as many civic, religious, commercial and industrial buildings from that period, and has been relatively little altered since the 1940s.

The district was listed on the National Register of Historic Places in 1995.

== See also ==
- National Register of Historic Places listings in Shenandoah County, Virginia
