= Edward R. Hanford =

Soldier

- Born: c. 1845; Allegany County, New York, US
- Died: 1890 (aged 44–45); California, US
- Burial place: Mokelumne Hill Protestant Cemetery, Mokelumne Hill, California
- Military career
- Allegiance: United States
- Branch: United States Army
- Service years: 1862–1865
- Rank: Private
- Unit: (United States) 2nd U.S. Cavalry Regiment
- Conflicts: American Civil War • Battle of Tom's Brook
- Awards: Medal of Honor

Edward Raymond Hanford (c. 1845–1890) was a private in the 2nd U.S. Cavalry, Company H, during the American Civil War. Born in Allegany County, New York, in 1845, Hanford captured the battle flag of the 32nd Battalion Virginia Cavalry of the Confederate States of America at the Battle of Tom's Brook, Woodstock, Virginia, on 9 October 1864. The Union charge, led by generals Wesley Merritt and George Armstrong Custer, successfully forced the Confederates to retreat 10 miles (16 km) southward of Woodstock. Hanford received the Medal of Honor on 14 October 1864 for capturing the Confederate battle flag during the charge and for demonstrating "extraordinary heroism". Hanford died in California in 1890 and was buried in the Mokelumne Hill Protestant Cemetery of Mokelumne Hill, Calaveras County.

== See also ==
- List of American Civil War Medal of Honor recipients
- Battle of Tom's Brook
