= Wilkins Farm =

Historic house in Virginia, United States

- U.S. National Register of Historic Places
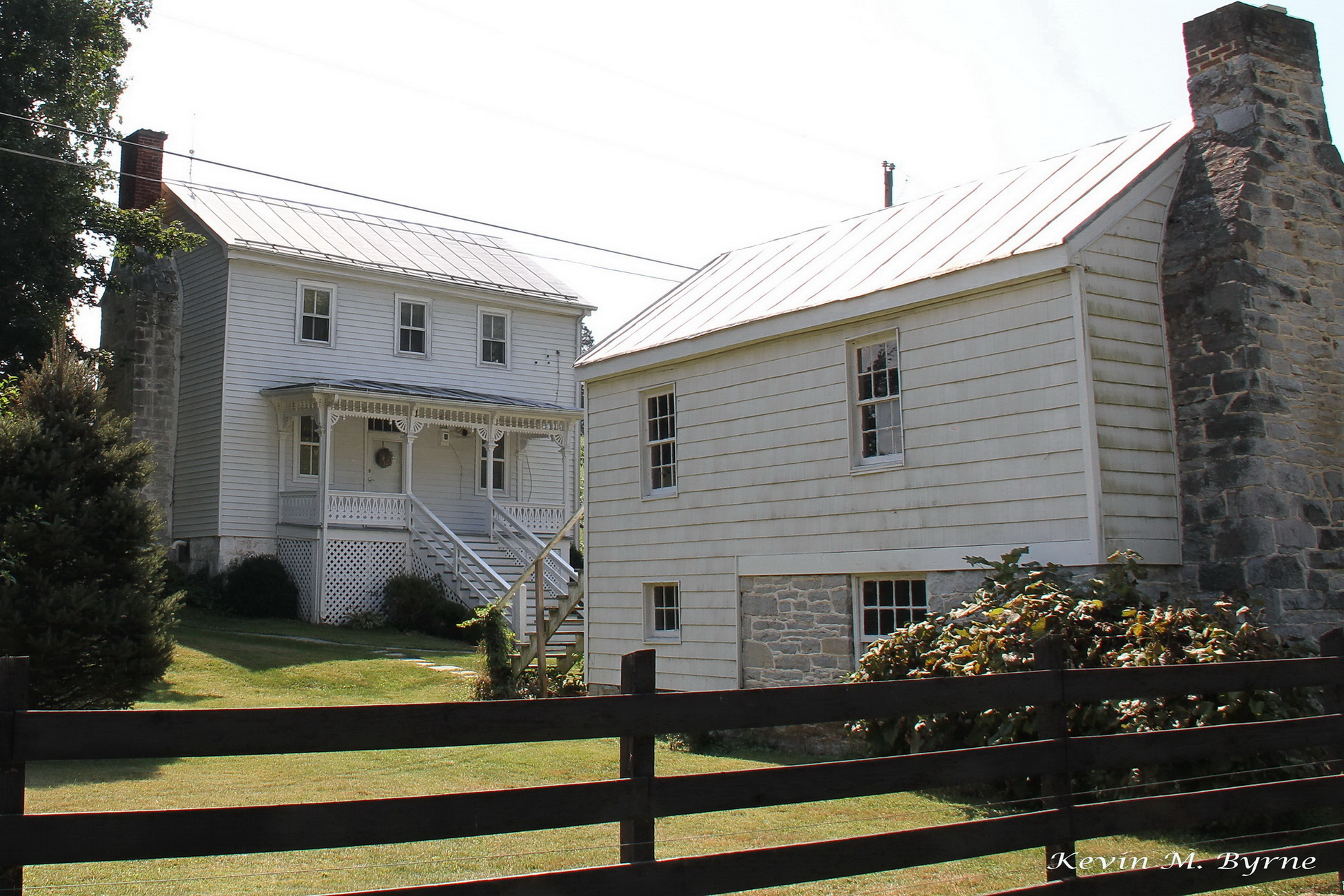

- Location within Virginia Location within the United States
- Location: 989 Swover Creek Road, near Edinburg, Virginia
- Coordinates: 38°50′23″N 78°36′34″W
- Area: 3.5 acres (1.4 ha)
- Built: 1776
- Built by: Augustine Cofman
- Architectural style: Federal
- NRHP reference No.: 13001175
- Added to NRHP: February 10, 2014

The Wilkins Farm is a historic farmstead at 989 Swover Creek Road in rural Shenandoah County, Virginia, near Edinburg. The home was recognized under three criterion. Criterion A under Exploration/Settlement as a late 18th-century German farmstead, Criterion B in the area of Art as the boyhood home of fraktur artist Emanuel Wilkins, and Criterion C for Architecture of German builders who used native materials of limestone, hardwoods and Yellow pine. The primary dwelling on the farm was a frontier log structure, c.1776 that was evolved to a two-story midland folk, log home c. 1789. The older portion, a simple log cabin, was built by Augustine Cofman in order to satisfy the requirements of a land grant he had received the prior year, which required placement of a dwelling on the 188.5-acre (76.3 ha) grant. A The larger, two- story log structure was built with the cabin as a side ell. The farm was in the Wilkins family from 1824 until 2003.

The farmstead was listed on the National Register of Historic Places in 2014.

== See also ==
- National Register of Historic Places listings in Shenandoah County, Virginia
