= Shenandoah County Farm =

- U.S. National Register of Historic Places
- Virginia Landmarks Register
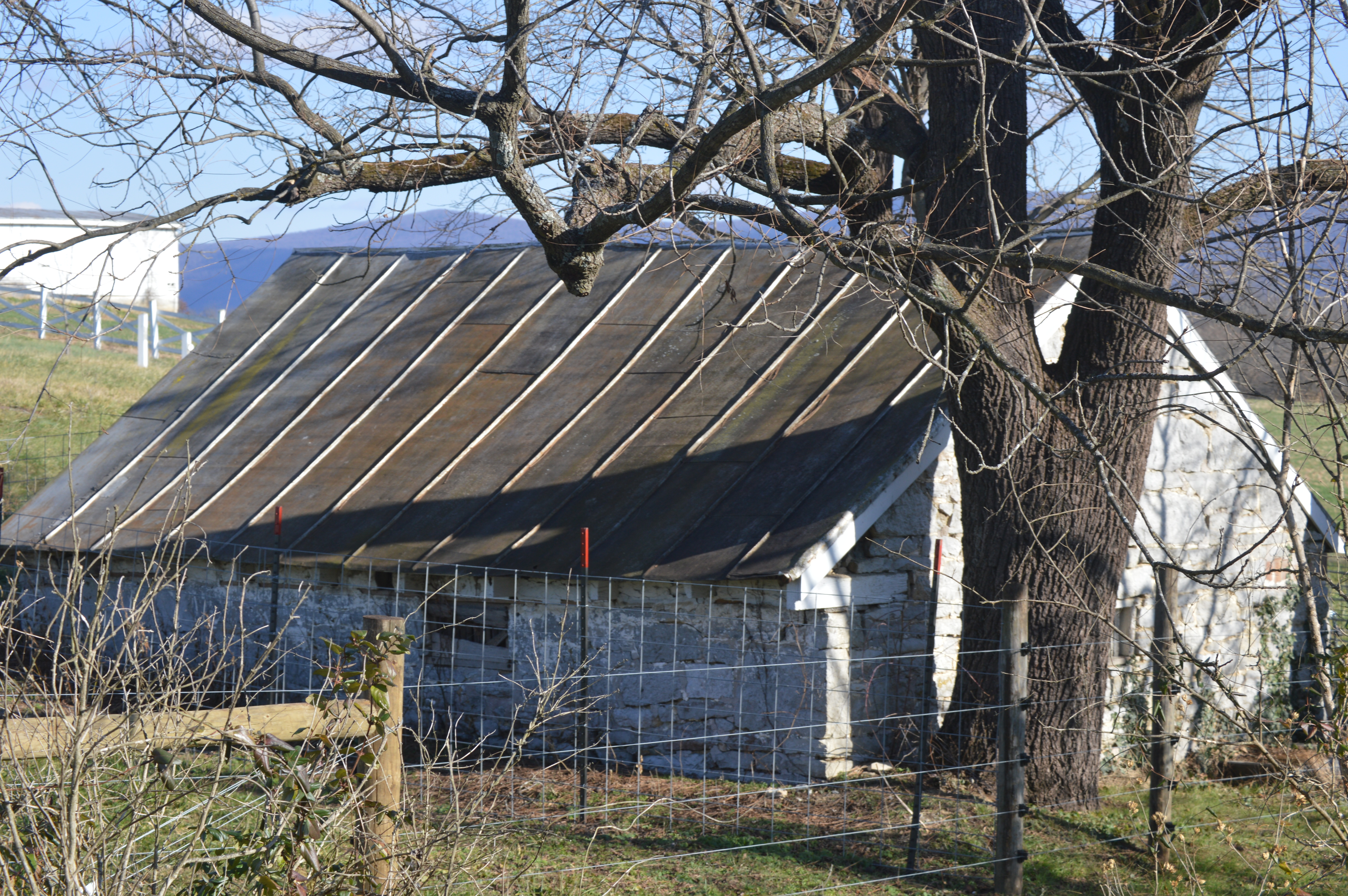
- One of the outbuildings

- Location within Virginia Location within the United States
- Location: North side VA 654, 4,000 feet (1,200 m) east of the junction with US 11, near Maurertown, Virginia
- Coordinates: 38°55′58″N 78°26′52″W
- Area: 166.4 acres (67.3 ha)
- Built: 1829, c. 1850
- Architectural style: Federal
- NRHP reference No.: 93001122
- VLR No.: 085-0086

Significant dates
- Added to NRHP: October 29, 1993
- Designated VLR: August 18, 1993

Shenandoah County Farm, also known as the Shenandoah County Almshouse and Beckford Parish Glebe Farm, is a historic almshouse and poor farm located near Maurertown, Shenandoah County, Virginia. The almshouse was built in 1829, and is a large, brick Federal style institutional building. It consists of a two-story, five-bay central section flanked by one-story, eight-bay, flanking wings. A nearly identical building is at the Frederick County Poor Farm. A two-story, rear kitchen wing was added about 1850. Also on the property are the contributing stone spring house, a large modern frame barn (1952), a frame meat house (1894), a cemetery, and a portion of an American Civil War encampment site, occupied by Union troops prior to the Battle of Tom's Brook.

It was listed on the National Register of Historic Places in 1993.

It was destroyed by fire in the early morning of April 13, 2014.
