= Mount Pleasant (Strasburg, Virginia) =

Historic house in Virginia, United States

- U.S. National Register of Historic Places
- Virginia Landmarks Register
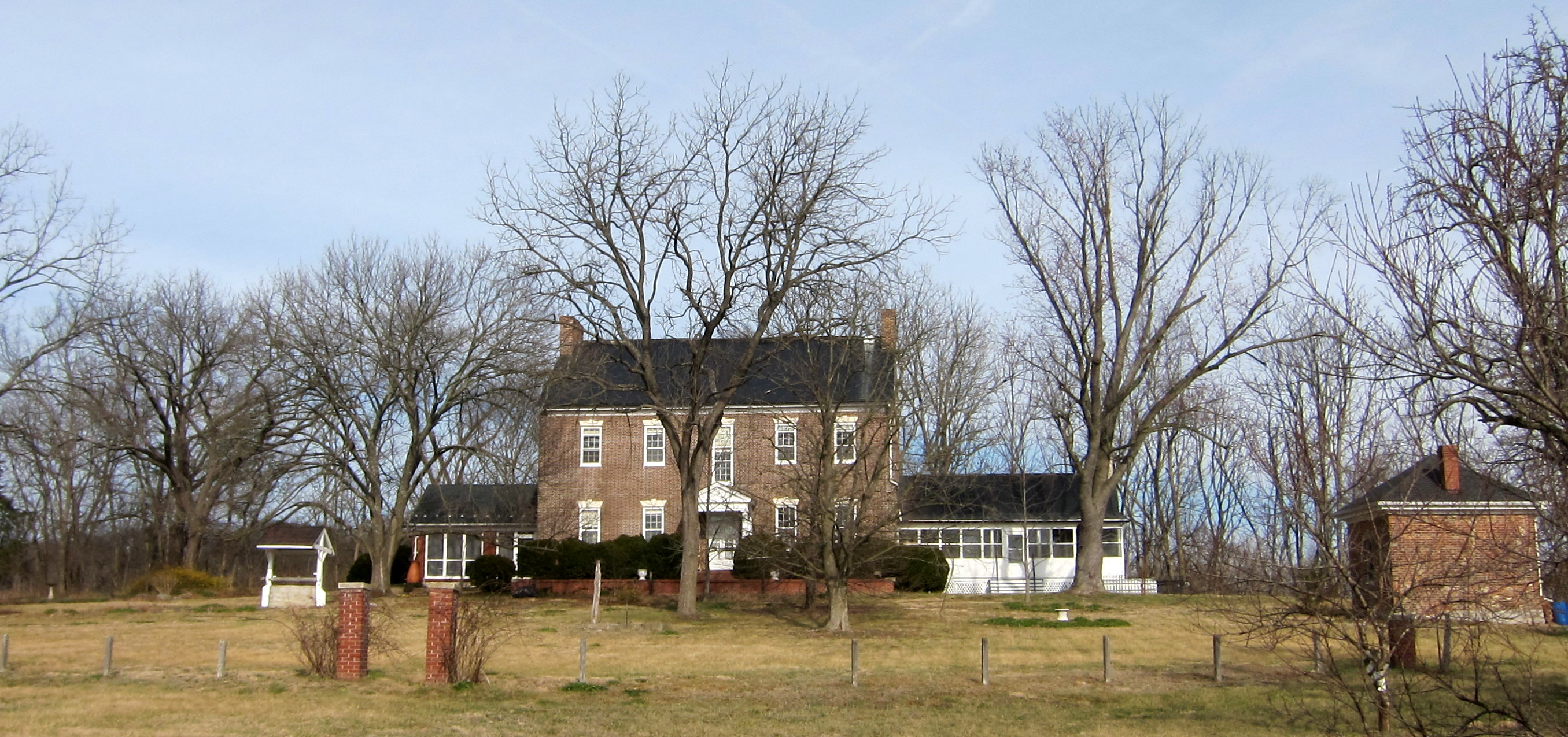
- Mount Pleasant in 2017

- Location within Virginia Location within the United States
- Location: 292 Hite Ln., near Strasburg, Virginia
- Coordinates: 39°00′02″N 78°20′04″W
- Area: 106.82 acres (43.23 ha)
- Built: c. 1790, 1812
- Architectural style: Federal
- NRHP reference No.: 11000553
- VLR No.: 085-0072

Significant dates
- Added to NRHP: August 18, 2011
- Designated VLR: June 16, 2011

Mount Pleasant is a historic home located near Strasburg, Shenandoah County, Virginia. It was built in 1812, and is a 2 1/2-story, five-bay, brick Federal style dwelling. The four-bay, one-story southeastern wing, constructed of dressed-rubble limestone, was probably built about 1790. It was renovated in the 1930s and in 1979. Also on the property are the contributing brick, pyramidal-roofed smokehouse (c. 1812); a large, frame, bank barn (c. 1890–1900); a frame wagon shed/corn crib (c. 1920); a frame tenant house and garage (c. 1920); an old well, no longer in use, with a circular stone wall and gable-roofed frame superstructure (c. 1920); a substantial, brick, gable-roofed, one-story garage (c. 1930); and the original road configuration from about 1790.

It was listed on the National Register of Historic Places in 2011.

== See also ==
- National Register of Historic Places listings in Shenandoah County, Virginia
