= Hupp House =

Historic house in Virginia, United States

- U.S. National Register of Historic Places
- Virginia Landmarks Register
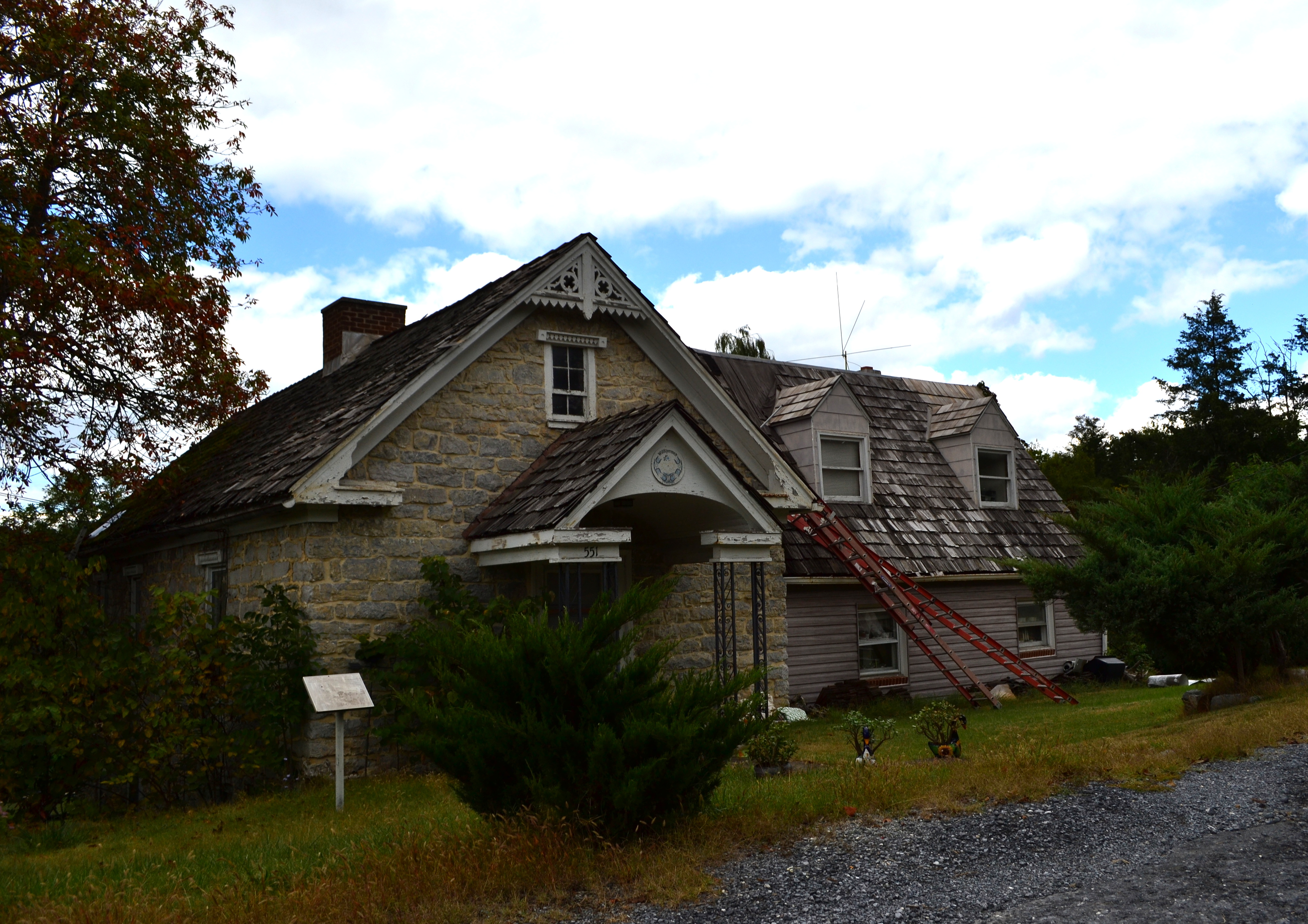
- Hupp House, September 2013

- Location within Virginia Location within the United States
- Location: 551 N. Massanutten St., near Strasburg, Virginia
- Coordinates: 38°59′42″N 78°21′22″W
- Area: 1.6 acres (0.65 ha)
- Built: c. 1755
- Architectural style: Colonial
- NRHP reference No.: 97000155
- VLR No.: 085-0007

Significant dates
- Added to NRHP: February 21, 1997
- Designated VLR: December 4, 1996

Hupp House, also known as the Frontier Fort and Hupp Homestead, is a historic home located in Strasburg, Shenandoah County, Virginia. It was built about 1755, and is a 4-story, rubble limestone Colonial-era dwelling. It is on a banked site and measures 20 feet wide by 40 feet deep. A concrete block east wing was added in 1956. The house has a steep gable roof and features a traditional Germanic central chimney and the interior framing appears original, with heavy traditional Germanic beams and roof structure. It is one of the oldest extant dwellings erected by Germanic settlers in Shenandoah County.

It was listed on the National Register of Historic Places in 1997.

== See also ==
- National Register of Historic Places in Shenandoah County, Virginia
