= Round Hill, Frederick County, Virginia =

Unincorporated community in Virginia, United States

Round Hill, Loudoun County, Virginia
- Unincorporated community
- Location within Virginia Location within the United States
- Coordinates: 39°11′37″N 78°14′32″W
- Country: United States
- State: Virginia
- County: Frederick
- Time zone: UTC−5 (Eastern (EST))
  - Summer (DST): UTC−4 (EDT)
- GNIS feature ID: 1477703

Round Hill is an unincorporated community in Frederick County, Virginia, United States. Round Hill is located west of Winchester on the Northwestern Turnpike (U.S. Route 50). It is often referred to as Round Hill after Round Hill (1381 ft) but this may cause confusion as there is already an incorporated town with the same name in nearby Loudoun County. Round Hill has also been known as Chambersville throughout its history. It lies on Round Hill Road (SR 803), off U.S. Route 50 at Poorhouse Road (SR 654).

The Frederick County Poor Farm was listed on the National Register of Historic Places in 1993.
