= Woodstock Museum of Shenandoah County Virginia =

Coordinates: 38.882487°N 78.507052°W

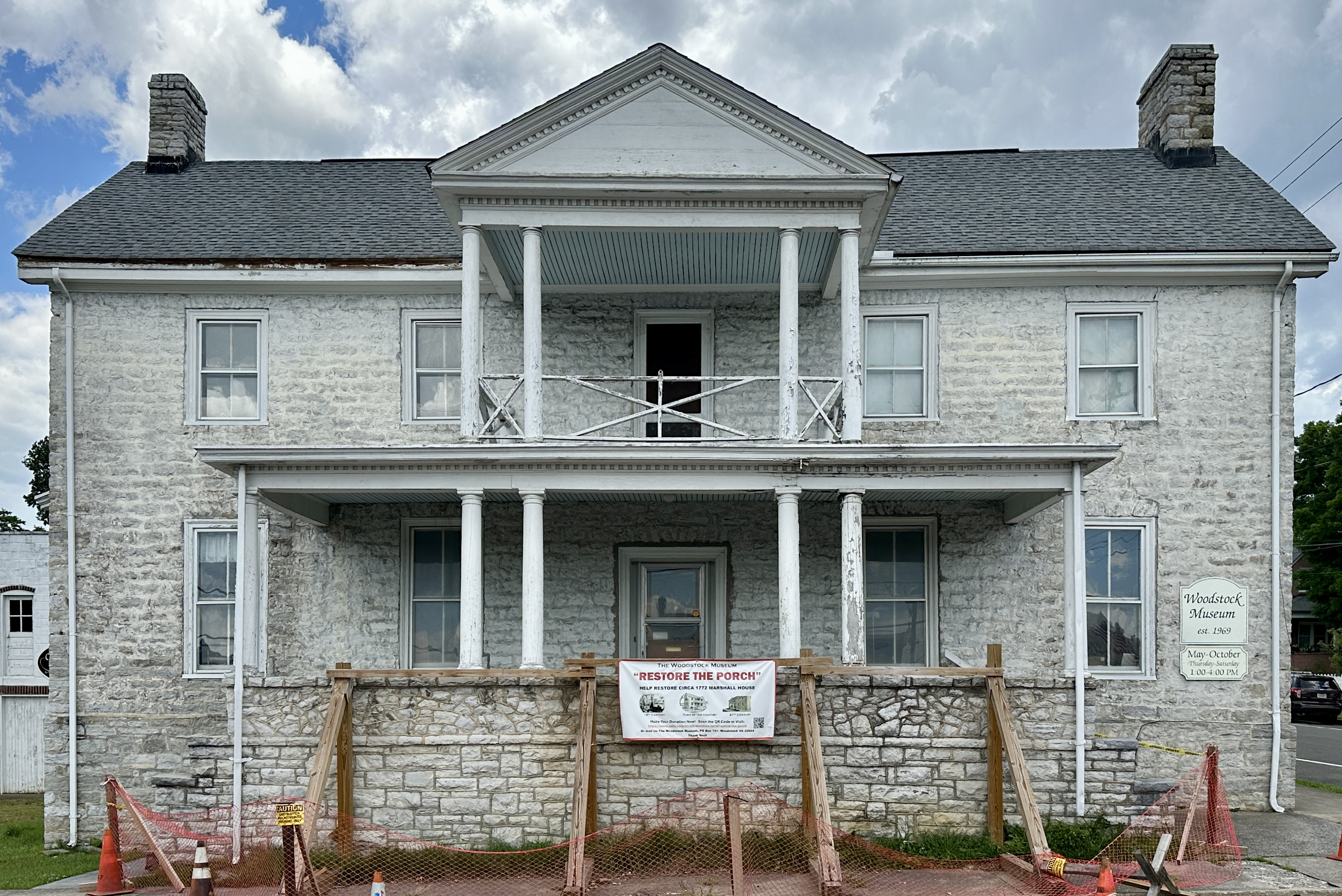
The musesum in 2026

The Woodstock Museum of Shenandoah County, Virginia, Inc., was formed in 1969 by a volunteer board of directors, and is an all-volunteer organization dedicated to "Preserving the Past for the Future." The Museum's artifacts are housed in two mid-late 18th century homes located in the heart of downtown Woodstock, Virginia, in the historic Shenandoah Valley. The Museum is open seasonally, May through October, Thursdays - Saturdays, from 1 pm until 4 pm.

== Marshall House ==
The primary museum building, known locally as the Marshall House, is a dressed limestone structure located at 140 South Muhlenberg Street. The building was said to have been the temporary home of Clerk of the Circuit Court Thomas Marshall, father of Supreme Court Justice John Marshall, as he made his rounds of the Northern Shenandoah Valley's Circuit Courtrooms.

Artifacts displayed in the Marshall House are representative of life in the town of Woodstock and the surrounding area. The house holds relics of the United States Civil War, local pottery, textiles such as quilts, coverlets and clothing, commemorative and advertising items from the town's past, frakturs and other paper items, fraternal organization regalia, the Morrison Photography Studio's camera and photographs taken during the turn of the 20th century by Woodstock photographer Hugh Morrison, Jr., the Ruth Rhodes Collection of regional walnut furniture, and much more. An "Annex" (the home's circa 1930's garage) holds tools, farm implements, and a complete moonshine still recovered long ago from the hills and hollows near the town.

== Wickham House ==
The second museum building is called the Wickham House, in honor of the man who donated the 18th century log home to the museum. The logs were long ago covered by clapboards, although during renovation a porthole was left in the plaster of the interior wall of the original kitchen with a view of the logs and chinking.

This house is set up as a museum with furniture and other artifacts displayed in room settings. It is also the home of the Baughman Family Collection of Artifacts. This collection was initially based upon the 1807 estate inventory of Henry Baughman (or Heinrich Bachmann), who was born in Shenandoah County and later in life moved south to Botetourt County. The Baughman Family has placed this extensive collection of 18th and early 19th century artifacts on long-term loan with the museum. The articles in the collection are displayed in the kitchen and a bedchamber of the house.
