= Frederick County Poor Farm =

Historic farm in Virginia, US

- U.S. National Register of Historic Places
- Virginia Landmarks Register
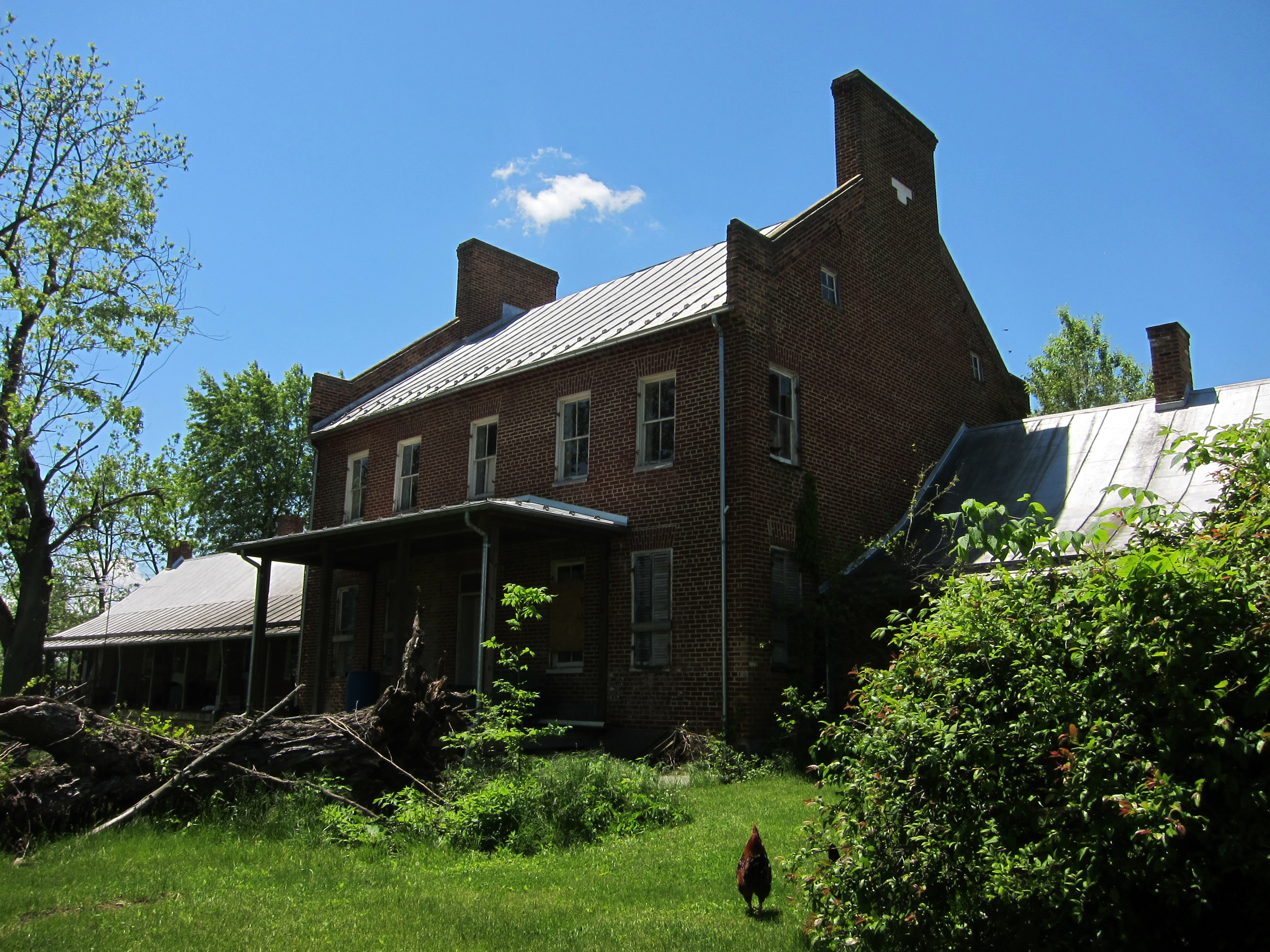
- Frederick County Poor Farm in 2016

- Location within Virginia Location within the United States
- Location: VA 654 E side, S of jct. with VA 679, Round Hill, Virginia
- Coordinates: 39°12′44″N 78°13′24″W
- Area: 24 acres (9.7 ha)
- Built: 1820
- Architectural style: Federal
- NRHP reference No.: 93000823
- VLR No.: 034-0099

Significant dates
- Added to NRHP: August 12, 1993
- Designated VLR: June 16, 1993

Frederick County Poor Farm, also known as the Frederick County Poorhouse, is a historic poor farm complex located in Round Hill, Frederick County, Virginia. The main building, erected in 1820, is a Federal-style building that consists of a two-story brick main block and original lateral one-story brick wings with gable roofs. A nearly identical building is at the Shenandoah County Farm. Also on the property are a contributing brick spring house, secondary dwelling, blacksmith shop, storage building, poultry house, and board-and-batten outbuilding. The Frederick County Poor Farm remained open until 1947.

It was listed on the National Register of Historic Places in 1993.

== See also ==
- National Register of Historic Places listings in Frederick County, Virginia
