= Woodstock, Virginia =

Town in Virginia, United States

- Town
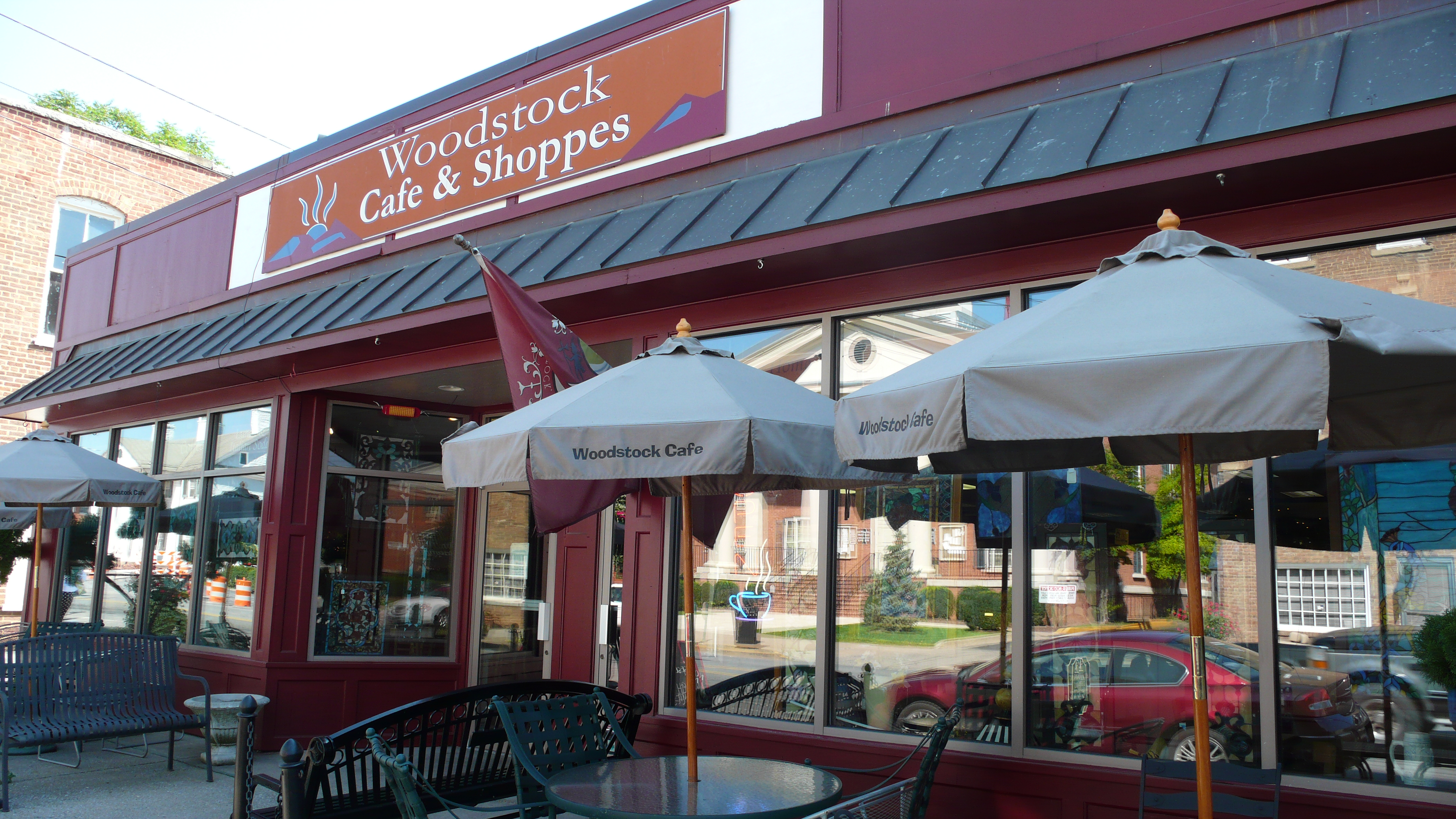
- The Woodstock Cafe and Shoppes in Woodstock's historic district

- Seal

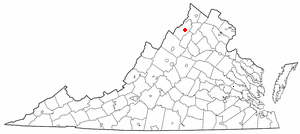
- Location of Woodstock in Virginia
- Coordinates: 38°52′37″N 78°30′41″W
- Country: United States
- State: Virginia
- County: Shenandoah

Government
  - Type: Town Council/Mayor

Area
  - Total: 3.82 sq mi (9.89 km^{2})
  - Land: 3.81 sq mi (9.87 km^{2})
  - Water: 0.0077 sq mi (0.02 km^{2})
- Elevation: 784 ft (239 m)

Population (2020)
  - Total: 5,807
  - Estimate (2019): 5,258
  - Density: 1,379.2/sq mi (532.52/km^{2})
- Time zone: UTC−5 (Eastern (EST))
  - Summer (DST): UTC−4 (EDT)
- ZIP Code: 22664
- Area code: 540
- FIPS code: 51-87712
- GNIS feature ID: 1500352
- Website: Official website

Woodstock is a town in and the county seat of Shenandoah County, Virginia, United States. As of the 2020 census, Woodstock had a population of 5,807. Woodstock comprises 3.2 square miles of incorporated area of the town and is located along the "Seven Bends" of the North Fork of the Shenandoah River. While some tourism references list Woodstock as the fourth oldest town in Virginia, the area was sparsely settled and perhaps platted in 1752 or shortly thereafter, but the town was actually established by charter in 1761. While there are a number of Virginia towns closer to the eastern seaboard that claim earlier founding dates, Woodstock was one of the first towns west of the Blue Ridge Mountains.

Massanutten Military Academy is located in Woodstock, as is the former location of the Sigma Sigma Sigma sorority's national headquarters. Woodstock is also home to the River Bandits of the Valley Baseball League, Shenandoah County Public Schools central campus, and the Shenandoah County Fairgrounds.

== History ==
The Town of Woodstock was established by charter in March 1761 as a part of what was then Frederick County. It was originally formed from a land grant from Lord Fairfax, and founded as Muellerstadt (Miller Town) in 1752 by founder Jacob Muller (or "Mueller"). The town's charter was sponsored by George Washington in Virginia's House of Burgesses. Woodstock has been the County Seat of Shenandoah County since Shenandoah County's formation in 1772.

=== Colonial era ===
The Shenandoah Valley region surrounding Woodstock was settled by Pennsylvania Germans who migrated south down the natural route of the Shenandoah Valley in the mid-18th century. The majority of these German settlers tended small farms that grew crops other than tobacco, were not slaveholders, and had Protestant faiths different from the established Anglican Church in Virginia, which differed from the English society that was prevalent on the eastern side of the Blue Ridge Mountains.

The Senedo people lived in the Shenandoah Valley around Woodstock, but they disappeared as a tribe prior to European settlement, possibly from attack by the Catawba people to the south. By the time the German settlers arrived, few Native Americans lived in the Shenandoah Valley. Several later tribes hunted in the valley, among them the Shawnee, Occoneechee, Monocans and Piscataways and the powerful Iroquois Confederation, so while not inhabiting the area Indians were likely not an uncommon sight. The seven bends have locations associated with Indian mounds dating back to the Late Woodland Period (AD 900–1650) in the area of the river between Woodstock and Strasburg, Virginia. After 250 years of plowing by settlers, the mounds have largely disappeared from sight, though traces of them have been detected with aerial photography.

Relations between Indians and settlers were friendly. In the 1750s, settlers began to sense trouble when Indians moved further west, over the Allegheny Mountains, where they were under influence of the French. During the French and Indian War, the French encouraged Indian raiding parties against so-called "English settlers" though most settlers in the Woodstock area were likely peaceable Germans. In the 1760s, there was constant danger of Indian raids, with some atrocities and brutality. The last Indian raid in the area occurred in 1766, three years after the formal end of the French and Indian War, about two miles south of Woodstock.

Route 11, which runs through Woodstock, was originally an Indian trail that served as a route between the Catawba in the south and the Lengape in the north, which were warring rivals. This came to be known as the Indian Road and was the main route for settlement and travel through the Shenandoah Valley. With many improvements, Route 11 has largely followed this route, which was later called the Great Wagon Road and then the Valley Pike. Jacob Muller apparently used this old trail in laying out the plans for the main street of what would become Woodstock. Muellerstadt was the early name for Woodstock.

=== Establishment ===
George Washington was a member of the Virginia House of Burgesses representing Frederick County, Virginia from 1758 to 1765 which included the Woodstock area until 1772. The new village of Woodstock was established by law in 1761. Washington sponsored the act, and named the town Woodstock at that time. George Washington also named Shenandoah Valley, the Shenandoah River, and Shenandoah County. He named these places after the Christian Oneida chief John Skenandoa who helped Americans survive during the American Revolution including at Valley Forge.

The Town of Woodstock's website notes that it was established by charter in March of 1761 as a part of what was then Frederick County. The town was originally formed by a land grant from Lord Fairfax, and named after its founder, Jacob Miller as Muellerstadt (Miller Town) in 1752. It was renamed Woodstock when the town's charter was sponsored by George Washington in Virginia's House of Burgesses. The Town of Woodstock has been the County Seat of Shenandoah County since the County's formation in 1772.

The act of the General Assembly gave full credit to Jacob Muller for initiating the idea. Muller came from Germany in 1749, and had initially settled in Pennsylvania. By 1752, he obtained 400 acres from Lord Fairfax for the area that eventually was included in the town limits of Woodstock. Muller settled in Narrow Passage near Woodstock, and in the next few years his holdings grew to something between 1200 and 2000 acres, and he proceeded to lay out a plan for the town, Mullerstadt. A few white settlers had preceded Muller, as the 1761 act establishing the town noted "several persons are now living there." It is realistic to assume this meant a scattering of log buildings. However, Muller's town plan was that referred to in the 1761 General Assembly act that established Woodstock.

There is no clear reason why the town's name was changed to Woodstock, though theories include it being renamed by Washington or perhaps for a wood stockade used by the community as shelter from Indian raids.

Jacob Muller's town continued for many years to be known as Millerstown, or to German language residents as Muellerstadt. During the years following the establishment of the town, Muller held a big land sale in which 40 parcels he plotted were purchased. Muller died in 1766, just four years after his land sales. Andrew Brewbaker, his son-in-law, became proprietor of his grant, supported by a board of trustees appointed by the General Assembly to govern the new town. This form of government continued until 1795, when the town was authorized to hold elections. In 1761, the town's appointed trustees left no records, so early history of Woodstock as a town cannot be determined with accuracy. There was also no local newspaper until 1817.

=== Revolutionary Era ===
In 1772, Woodstock became the county seat of Dunmore County, which was renamed Shenandoah County in 1777 during the American Revolutionary War, shedding the name of the controversial last royal governor of Virginia. Being named the county seat had significant impact for the development of the town. As a county seat, Woodstock necessitated the building of a courthouse and jail. By 1774, the county had erected a permanent courthouse. That original courthouse was replaced in 1795 with a limestone building designed by Thomas Jefferson, using native limestone. It was enlarged in 1871 and 1886. The Shenandoah County Courthouse, located on Main Street, is the oldest courthouse still in use west of the Blue Ridge Mountains.

==== Peter Muhlenberg ====
John Peter Gabriel Muhlenberg, a native of Pennsylvania who was formerly a soldier in the British Army and German dragoons, accepted a call to become pastor to a Woodstock congregation in 1771. After theological training, he served both Lutherans and Episcopalians for four years in a wide-ranging pastorate in the Shenandoah Valley. During this time, he was drawn to in politics, serving in the House of Burgesses in 1774 and as a delegate to the First Virginia Convention. Muhlenberg became famous for his impassioned speeches in support of the American Revolutionary cause, helping to raise a regiment in the Shenandoah Valley among its German and Scots-Irish frontier population. He led the 8th Virginia Regiment, as its Colonel in the Continental Army.

At the conclusion of his fiery farewell sermon in Woodstock on January 21, 1776, Muhlenberg famously threw off his clerical robes to reveal an officer's uniform beneath and proclaimed, according to later reports, "in the language of Holy Writ there is a time for all things, a time to preach and a time to pray, but those times have passed away. There is a time to fight, and that time has now come." Muhlenberg went on to be promoted to a general in the Continental Army and led units in many battles, from the Battle of Brandywine to the Battle of Yorktown. Upon the end of the war in 1783, he did not return to live in Woodstock, but instead returned to his native Pennsylvania as a war hero, served in elected capacities and then was elected to the First Continental Congress (1788-1789) and several successive Congresses. Elected to the United States Senate in 1801, he resigned to return to a revenue post in Philadelphia, where he died on October 1, 1807. His statue in the U.S. Capitol's National Statuary Hall Collection was submitted by Pennsylvania in 1889, and Muhlenberg remains revered in Woodstock for his fiery sermon and the unit he raised and inspired to fight for the nation's independence.

The frontier-recruited 8th Virginia Regiment was drawn from Augusta, Berkeley, Culpeper, Dunmore (Shenandoah), Fincastle, and Frederick Counties in the Shenandoah Valley. It was also drawn from the districts of Hampshire County and West Augusta, which are in present-day West Virginia, and elsewhere along the Virginia frontier, which stretched from Kentucky to Fort Pitt (now Pittsburgh, PA). Two of the ten companies were raised from the Dunmore County area of Woodstock. It was led by Muhlenberg, Colonel of the regiment and Abraham Bowman, Lt. Colonel, both from Woodstock. The 8th Virginia was called "The German Regiment" though it also contained substantial numbers of Scots-Irish. Frequently separated and detached to other units, the men of this tough, frontier-bred regiment served with distinction in many theaters of the war: White Plains, Trenton, Princeton, Short Hills, Cooch's Bridge, Brandywine, Saratoga, Germantown and Charleston. They suffered the hardships at Valley Forge, and were afterwards mustered out of service, with those who reenlisted merging into other Virginia units.

=== Railroads ===
The commercial importance of Woodstock was enhanced by the coming of the railroad, and the railroad had significant impact upon the Woodstock's development. The first railroad south of Strasburg was the Manassas Gap Railroad. On March 2, 1859, the line was extended to Mount Jackson. The Civil War interrupted the work however, and the line remained a long spur from Strasburg, with Mount Jackson as the terminus. In 1865 the Baltimore & Ohio Railroad (B&O) acquired and reconstructed the line after extensive damage during the Civil War, merging it with the Orange & Alexandria to form the Orange, Alexandria and Manassas Railroad. They then extended the line to Harrisonburg in 1868. In 1872, the B&O formed a separate subsidiary railroad on the line known as the Strasburg & Harrisonburg RR (S&H RR). In 1873 the B&O RR leased and operated the S&H RR between Strasburg and Harrisonburg. But the B&O encountered financial difficulties and sold the S&H railroad subsidiary to the Southern Railway in 1896.

In 1888, the B&O built a passenger station in Woodstock, made with native limestone, noted as one of the more elaborate passenger depots in the region. Woodstock became a freight rail entrepot with outward bound shipments of grain, cattle and fruit and inward bound freight of manufactured goods, rail service that continued into the 1960s. Passenger service ended in 1948 and freight rail service began to decline in the 1950s, reflecting a nationwide shift to cars and trucks with the advent of the national highway system. While individual industries were still served, sometime before 1969 regular freight depot service ended and the Woodstock freight depot was demolished in the 1970s. The Southern Railway merged with the Norfolk & Western in 1982 to become the Norfolk Southern Railroad, which owns the line through Woodstock to this day. However, industrial need for the line ended, and the rail between Strasburg between Edinburg (through Woodstock) is out of service, though the track remains.

In 1954, the B&O sold the passenger station, and it was torn down in 1954 by a local businessman despite protests of many locals, and its loss damaged Woodstock's historical character and heritage as a once-active railroad town.

=== Civil War Era ===
Confederate military units raised in Woodstock included Company F (the Muhlenberg Rifles) of the 10th Virginia Infantry (of whom 71% had German surnames) as well as Company C of the 33rd Virginia Infantry, part of the Stonewall Brigade led by Thomas "Stonewall" Jackson. While the area had an active Confederate population, it also was home to many reluctant secessionists, Unionists and families religiously opposed to slavery and war (Mennonites, German Dunkards.) In addition, traditional enmity between the slavery-based plantation society in eastern Virginia and the small farm populations over the rugged Blue Ridge and Allegheny mountains, where slavery was not as predominant an economic institution, meant that allegiances in the Shenandoah Valley and western Virginia were often divided. Many of German descent in the Shenandoah Valley were generally or religiously opposed to slavery, even as others with German ethnicity served in the Confederate Army.

The Civil War left no serious visible scars on the town, although there was partisan activity and retaliation. A few buildings were destroyed, notably the railroad depot and some warehouses along with a locomotive and some rolling stock. No major battles were fought in the immediate vicinity of the town, although skirmishes and large troop movements were not uncommon. Recorded skirmishes in Woodstock were May 18 and 21, 1862; June 2, 1862; February 26, 1863; November 16, 1863; September 23, 1864; and March 14, 1865. Various homes were used from time to time as staff headquarters by both sides, and as the occasional military hospital. General Thomas "Stonewall" Jackson made Woodstock his headquarters during part of his Valley Campaign in spring 1862, using the small brick law office near the courthouse. Union General Phil Sheridan sent a famous telegraph message from Woodstock during his own Valley campaign in 1864, during which his army destroyed anything of military value to the Confederates, stating “I have destroyed over 2,000 barns filled with wheat, burned over 70 mills filled with grain and flour. I have made the Shenandoah Valley of Virginia so bare that a crow flying over it would have to carry its knapsack.”

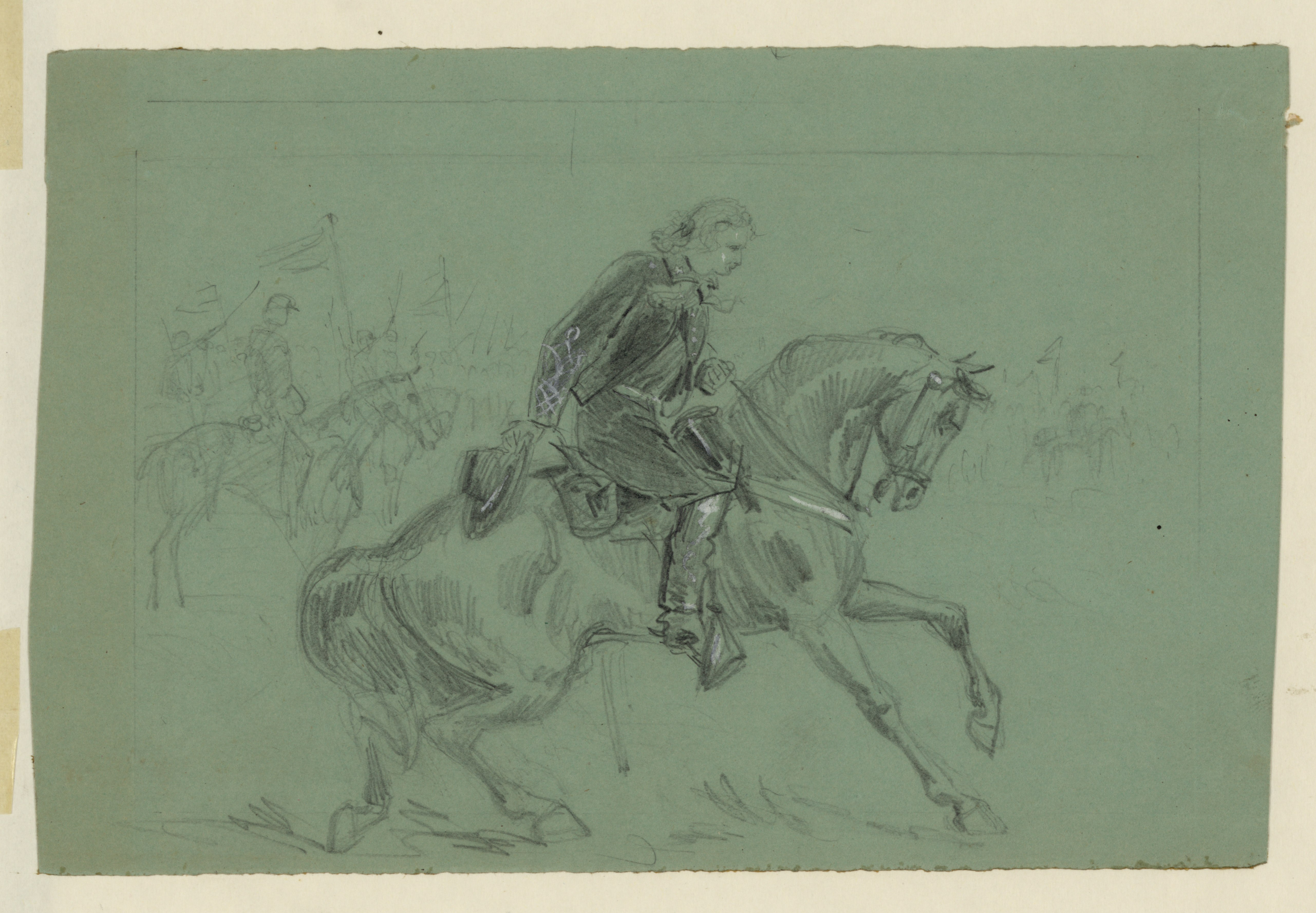
Prior to the Battle of Tom's Brook and the Woodstock Races, Gen. George Armstrong Custer rode in front of his cavalry and made a famous gesture of salute to Confederate enemy and West Point classmate, Maj Gen. Thomas L. Rosser, sketched by Alfred Wall

.

One small but significant cavalry battle occurred 4.5 miles north of Woodstock, at Tom's Brook on October 9, 1864. The Battle of Tom's Brook followed a Union victory at the Battle of Fisher's Hill. After Fisher's Hill, Sheridan's Union cavalry pursued Jubal Early's Confederates south to Staunton, after which the Federals withdrew, devastating anything of military benefit in their path, a campaign known in the Shenandoah as "The Burning." Rebel cavalry harassed the withdrawal, until Union troopers under Wesley Merritt and George Armstrong Custer turned and routed the divided Confederate divisions of Rosser and Lomax at Tom's Brook, 5 miles south of Strasburg and 4.5 miles north of Woodstock. The Confederate cavalry's disorderly retreat from battle became known as the "Woodstock Races", because the routed Rebel troopers fled back in disarray through Woodstock all the way to Mt. Jackson. A total of 6,300 Federal troopers and 3,500 Confederates engaged in the battle, with Union casualties at 57 and Confederate losses at 350. With the victory, the Union cavalry attained superiority in the Valley. The Battle of Tom's Brook preceded by ten days the dramatic, large-scale and climactic battle at Cedar Creek (just north of Strasburg) between Early and Sheridan, which ended in a decisive Union victory that smashed any real threat of Confederate power in the Shenandoah or invasion of Washington DC via the Valley. The Battle of Tom's Brook, and the "Woodstock Races," occurred in significant part along the Valley Pike, now Route 11.

About 20 miles south of the town, the Battle of New Market also had Woodstock context. In conjunction with spring 1864 offensives, Union Lt. Gen. Ulysses S. Grant ordered Maj. Gen. Franz Sigel to move down the Valley Pike from West Virginia to Lynchburg, to destroy its railroads and canal while denying the rich Shenandoah Valley to the Confederacy. Receiving intelligence on these movements, Confederate Maj. Gen. John C. Breckinridge scraped together all available troops, including cadets from Virginia Military Institute (VMI) in Lexington. Sigel's advance was slowed by Confederate cavalry and undermined by his own command jealousies and inept decisions, but on May 11 his cavalry captured a lightly defended Woodstock. The Confederates were forced out of Woodstock so fast that several telegrams between Breckinridge and his cavalry commander John D. Imboden fell into Union hands. These Woodstock dispatches revealed strength and location of Confederate forces as well as a rough time table for a cavalry rendezvous with the main Confederate force - potentially a game-changing intelligence coup. But rather than acting decisively, Sigel continued his cautious advance, allowing Confederates time to concentrate. Breckenridge decided to attack Sigel's army, which had advanced from Woodstock. The Battle of New Market occurred on morning of May 15. Threatened by cavalry on his flank and rear, Sigel withdrew and retreated through Woodstock all the way to Strasburg. Sigel's army outnumbered Breckinridge's by 6,275 to 4,087. Union losses were 841 while Confederate casualties were 531. The Valley remained in Confederate control until Sheridan's arrival.

=== Historic Structures ===
Lantz Hall, a structure at Massanutten Military Academy, and the Shenandoah County Courthouse are listed on the National Register of Historic Places. The Woodstock Historic District comprising the historic center of the town of Woodstock, was listed on the National Register of Historic Places in 1995. It includes examples of early architecture in the town from its earliest years into the 1940s, having been little altered since then.

== Demographics ==
Historical population
Census	Pop.	Note	%±
1860	998		—
1870	859		−13.9%
1880	1,000		16.4%
1890	1,068		6.8%
1900	1,069		0.1%
1910	1,314		22.9%
1920	1,580		20.2%
1930	1,552		−1.8%
1940	1,546		−0.4%
1950	1,816		17.5%
1960	2,083		14.7%
1970	2,338		12.2%
1980	2,627		12.4%
1990	3,182		21.1%
2000	3,952		24.2%
2010	5,097		29.0%
2020	5,807		13.9%
U.S. Decennial Census

As of the census of 2000, there were 3,952 people, 1,685 households, and 1,029 families residing in the town. The population density was 1,216.9 people per square mile (469.5/km^{2}). There were 1,840 housing units at an average density of 566.6 per square mile (218.6/km^{2}). The racial makeup of the town was 91.62% White, 2.73% African American, 0.08% Native American, 0.18% Asian, 0.03% Pacific Islander, 4.28% from other races, and 1.09% from two or more races. Hispanic or Latino of any race were 6.43% of the population.

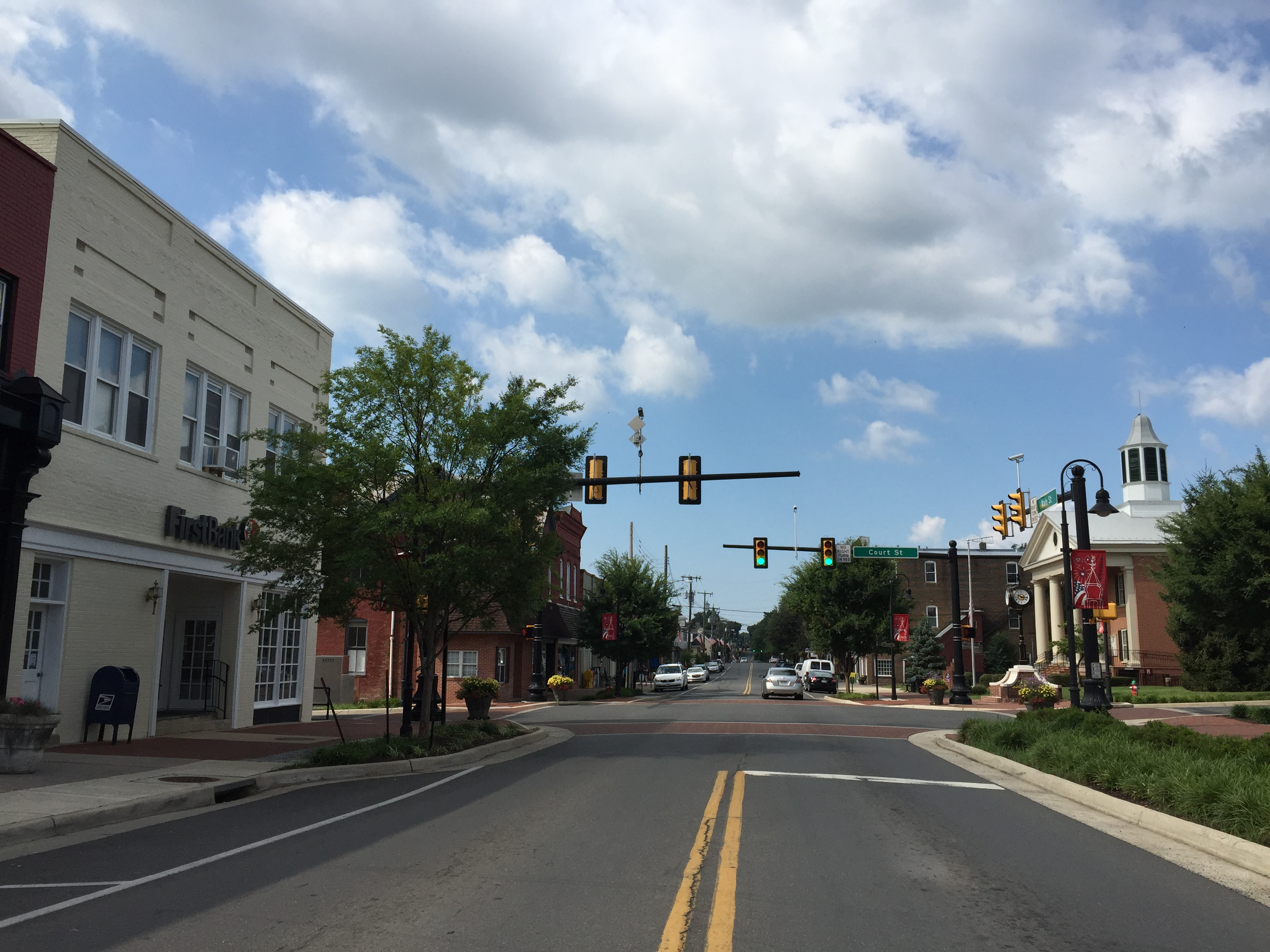
Main Street in Woodstock

There were 1,685 households, out of which 25.7% had children under the age of 18 living with them, 46.6% were married couples living together, 11.6% had a female householder with no husband present, and 38.9% were non-families. 33.6% of all households were made up of individuals, and 18.3% had someone living alone who was 65 years of age or older. The average household size was 2.17 and the average family size was 2.76.

In the town, the population was spread out, with 20.6% under the age of 18, 7.0% from 18 to 24, 24.5% from 25 to 44, 21.0% from 45 to 64, and 26.9% who were 65 years of age or older. The median age was 43 years. For every 100 females, there were 81.5 males. For every 100 females age 18 and over, there were 74.4 males.

The median income for a household in the town was $35,288, and the median income for a family was $38,778. Males had a median income of $25,616 versus $22,115 for females. The per capita income for the town was $18,373. About 10.4% of families and 12.6% of the population were below the poverty line, including 26.3% of those under age 18 and 4.2% of those age 65 or over.

== Geography ==
Woodstock is located at 38°52′37″N 78°30′41″W (38.877075, −78.511521).

According to the United States Census Bureau, the town has a total area of 3.2 square miles (8.4 km^{2}), all land.

The town is located 11.4 miles (18.3 km) southwest of Strasburg, 18 miles (29 km) southwest of Middletown, and 31.5 miles southwest of Winchester.

Woodstock is located along the "Seven Bends" of the North Fork of the Shenandoah River, which are seven significant meanders that are unusually sharp and tightly packed. In 48 miles (77 kilometers) of flow, the river travels only 16 miles (26 kilometers) as the crow flies. These large looping turns in the river were in earlier times a significant feature for which the town was known.

== Climate ==
The climate in this area is characterized by hot, humid summers and generally cold though not severe winters. July highs averaging 85.1 °F or 29.5 °C. Winters are chilly, with January lows averaging 20.1 °F or −6.6 °C. Snowfall averages 23 inches or 0.58 metres per year, while rainfall per year averages 37 inches or 940 millimetres.

According to the Köppen Climate Classification system, Woodstock, due to lying between the 27 °F (−3 °C) isotherm and the 32 °F (0 °C) isotherm, is in the transition zone between a humid continental climate, abbreviated Dfa on climate maps, and a humid subtropical climate, abbreviated Cfa on climate maps. The hardiness zone is 6b.

Climate data for Woodstock, Virginia (1991–2020 normals, extremes 1886–present)
Month	Jan	Feb	Mar	Apr	May	Jun	Jul	Aug	Sep	Oct	Nov	Dec	Year
Record high °F (°C)	80 (27)	85 (29)	93 (34)	97 (36)	98 (37)	103 (39)	109 (43)	107 (42)	106 (41)	98 (37)	86 (30)	80 (27)	109 (43)
Mean daily maximum °F (°C)	42.3 (5.7)	45.7 (7.6)	53.7 (12.1)	64.8 (18.2)	73.4 (23.0)	81.6 (27.6)	86.1 (30.1)	84.6 (29.2)	78.5 (25.8)	67.7 (19.8)	56.1 (13.4)	46.2 (7.9)	65.1 (18.4)
Daily mean °F (°C)	31.8 (−0.1)	34.2 (1.2)	41.6 (5.3)	51.9 (11.1)	61.2 (16.2)	70.0 (21.1)	74.4 (23.6)	72.9 (22.7)	66.0 (18.9)	54.8 (12.7)	43.7 (6.5)	35.7 (2.1)	53.2 (11.8)
Mean daily minimum °F (°C)	21.3 (−5.9)	22.7 (−5.2)	29.5 (−1.4)	39.0 (3.9)	49.1 (9.5)	58.3 (14.6)	62.6 (17.0)	61.1 (16.2)	53.6 (12.0)	41.8 (5.4)	31.4 (−0.3)	25.3 (−3.7)	41.3 (5.2)
Record low °F (°C)	−22 (−30)	−23 (−31)	−5 (−21)	11 (−12)	26 (−3)	35 (2)	39 (4)	33 (1)	28 (−2)	18 (−8)	0 (−18)	−13 (−25)	−23 (−31)
Average precipitation inches (mm)	2.90 (74)	2.33 (59)	3.23 (82)	2.82 (72)	4.36 (111)	4.22 (107)	3.94 (100)	3.44 (87)	4.44 (113)	2.60 (66)	2.49 (63)	2.78 (71)	39.55 (1,005)
Average snowfall inches (cm)	7.4 (19)	6.9 (18)	3.6 (9.1)	0.0 (0.0)	0.0 (0.0)	0.0 (0.0)	0.0 (0.0)	0.0 (0.0)	0.0 (0.0)	0.0 (0.0)	0.7 (1.8)	5.1 (13)	23.7 (60)
Average precipitation days (≥ 0.01 in)	8.2	6.8	8.3	9.3	12.1	10.8	10.2	9.7	8.6	7.4	6.4	7.6	105.4
Average snowy days (≥ 0.1 in)	2.5	2.3	1.1	0.0	0.0	0.0	0.0	0.0	0.0	0.0	0.3	1.6	7.8
Source: NOAA

== Recreation ==
Seven Bends State Park is located just outside of town limits with 1,066 acre area in total. The master plan for Seven Bends State Park was adopted on November 26, 2008 by the Department of Conservation and Recreation (DCR). The park is in the geographically unique "Seven Bends" area of the North Fork of the Shenandoah River and provides access to the River's North Fork. The park's eastern border is shared with the George Washington- Jefferson National Forest, and the park's western boundary is the North Fork of the Shenandoah River, which includes a four-mile-long shoreline.

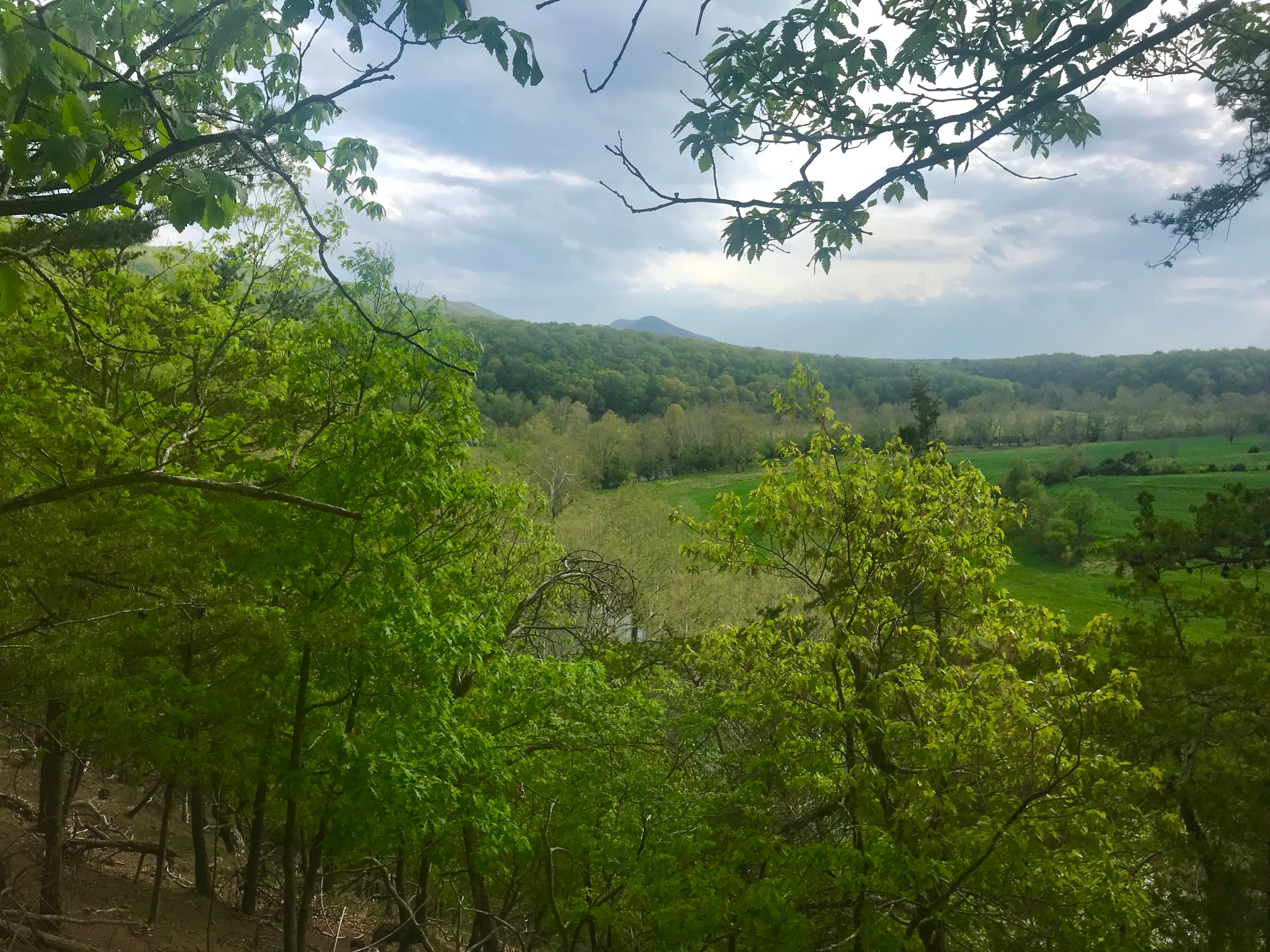
Seven Bends State Park, just outside of Woodstock, is one of the newest additions to the Virginia State Parks system and was formally opened in 2019.

The Woodstock Tower, built in 1935 by the Civilian Conservation Corps, is located on a 2000 ft mountain that overlooks the town. The tower is a popular sightseeing attraction, providing panoramic views of the valleys on either side and of the seven bends of the North Fork of the Shenandoah River. In March 2019, a portion of the road leading to the tower crumbled due to erosion. The road received $350,000 worth of repairs by Virginia Department of Transportation. The road re-opened again in November 2019.

In the August to September time frame each year, Woodstock's Shenandoah County Fairgrounds plays host to the Shenandoah County Fair, which includes concerts, horse harness races, crafts, and farm exhibitions. The Shenandoah County Fair has been held on these premises since 1917. In addition, the Fairgrounds host a horse harness racing season in September and October called Shenandoah Downs.

=== Viticultural attractions ===
The Shenandoah Valley's relatively dry climate, warm days and cool nights are conducive to producing good wine. The climate allows grapes to attain higher acidity, which is generally positive for wine. Limestone soil, which is common to the Valley, has been long associated with great wine growing regions in Europe. The region is a designated American Viticultural Area (AVA), Virginia's first AVA, identified in 1982. The Shenandoah Valley is a relatively dry "rain shadow," as storms soak the mountains on either side of the Blue Ridge and Alleghenies. The growing season in the Valley is distinctly warmer and drier than in neighboring Virginia regions, which don't have the natural rain barrier from the nearby mountains, and where, east of the Blue Ridge, vineyard soils are primarily clay and loam. The annual rainfall in the Valley is one half that of the Virginia average. These conditions are thus more favorable for Cabernet Franc, Chambourcin, Cabernet Sauvignon, Lemberger, Petit Manseng, Petit Verdot, Pinot Noir, and Riesling. The area around Woodstock has several wineries. Muse Vineyards is located in Woodstock within the "Seven Bends" area of the North Fork of the Shenandoah River. Other nearby wineries include Cave Ridge Vineyard, about 14 miles southwest of Woodstock in the rural hills of Shenandoah County, and Shenandoah Vineyards, about 4.5 miles from Woodstock in Edinburg, VA (Shenandoah Vineyards is reportedly the second oldest active winery in Virginia and was founded in 1976). In addition to wineries, Woodstock has a brewpub, the Woodstock Brewhouse, founded in 2015, housed in a restored industrial-age facility that was formerly a Woodstock denim factory.

== Economy ==
The largest employers in Woodstock, as of 2016, were Shenandoah County School Board, Shenandoah County, Valley Health Care System, Walmart, Food Lion, and Lowe's.

== Transportation ==
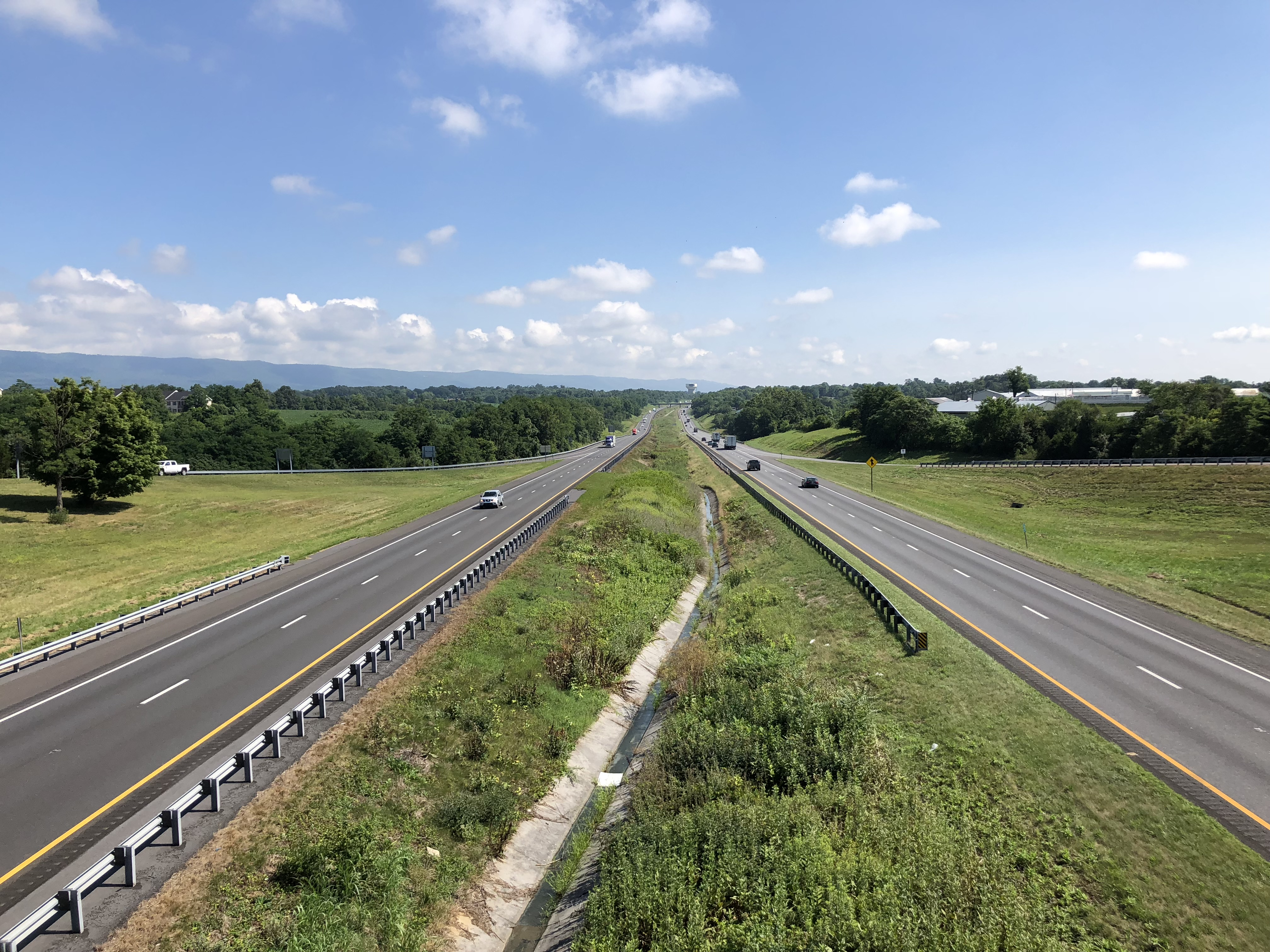
View north along Interstate 81 from SR 42 in Woodstock

Interstate 81 is the main highway providing access to Woodstock. I-81 extends south to Tennessee and north to West Virginia, Maryland, Pennsylvania and New York. Virginia State Route 42 extends southwest from Woodstock into rural southwestern Shenandoah County. SR 42 also connects I-81 to U.S. Route 11, which serves as a local service road for I-81 and is known as Main Street within Woodstock. Route 11 follows the historical route through the Shenandoah Valley, and was once known as the Indian Road and later the Great Wagon Road and the Valley Pike. Route 11 is now the principal local through road connecting towns in the Valley and is dotted with historical markers and scenic points.

The Norfolk Southern railroad has a rail line that runs through town for which service has been discontinued, but Norfolk Southern has been unclear as to whether they will fully abandon the line. It is part of a roughly 17 mile stretch of discontinued railroad line from Edinburg, VA to Strasburg, VA. Norfolk Southern announced in 2016 it was planning on no longer servicing the line. The rail bed is now increasingly overgrown with weeds and has not been maintained and putting it back into service would be costly and especially unlikely since there is no prospect of industry that needs rail service in volume that would be profitable for Norfolk Southern. There is discussion and ideas surrounding making 2.5 miles of the discontinued line in Woodstock into a rail trail, but the program's funding has not been determined, and neither have the intentions of Norfolk Southern regarding the rail line. As part of its fiscal 2018 budget, the Woodstock Town Council approved $40,000 in capital improvement funds to hire a designer to develop blueprints of the trail system, but no designer has been hired yet, as the program is still in the "exploratory phase."

Shenandoah Valley Commuter Bus Service offers weekday commuter bus service from Northern Shenandoah Valley including Shenandoah County and Warren County to Northern Virginia and Washington, D.C. including Arlington County and Fairfax County. Origination points in Shenandoah County include Woodstock. Origination points in Warren County include Front Royal and Linden.

== Notable people ==
- Robert Allen, United States Congressman from Virginia.
- Charles B. Gatewood, United States Army officer
- Mia Khalifa, Media personality
- John Magruder, Brigadier general in the U.S. Army, Deputy Director for Intelligence for the OSS
- Jim Moran, publicist
- Sandie Pendleton, lieutenant colonel in the C.S. Army, adjutant to Stonewall Jackson and other Confederate generals, died in Woodstock.
- Alfred C. Richmond, Commandant of the United States Coast Guard
- Jason F. Wright, author
- Benjamin C. Freakley, Lieutenant General, U.S. Army.
