= Quicksburg, Virginia =

- Unincorporated community Census designated place
- Quicksburg in 2025
- Interactive map of Quicksburg, Virginia
- Coordinates: 38°41′35″N 78°40′44″W
- Country: United States
- State: Virginia
- County: Shenandoah
- Time zone: UTC−5 (Eastern (EST))
  - Summer (DST): UTC−4 (EDT)
- FIPS code: 51-04928

Quicksburg is an unincorporated community and census designated place (CDP) in Shenandoah County, in the U.S. state of Virginia.

The Benjamin Wierman House and Zirkle Mill are listed on the National Register of Historic Places.

In 2024, the Shenandoah County school board voted to restore Confederate names to Quicksburg district's Ashby-Lee Elementary and Stonewall Jackson High schools after having removed them in 2020. This appears to be the first district in the country to restore Confederate names once removed from schools.

== Demographics ==
Historical population
Census	Pop.	Note	%±
U.S. Decennial Census

The United States Census Bureau first defined Quicksburg as a census designated place in 2023.
