= Forestville, Virginia =

Forestville
- CDP
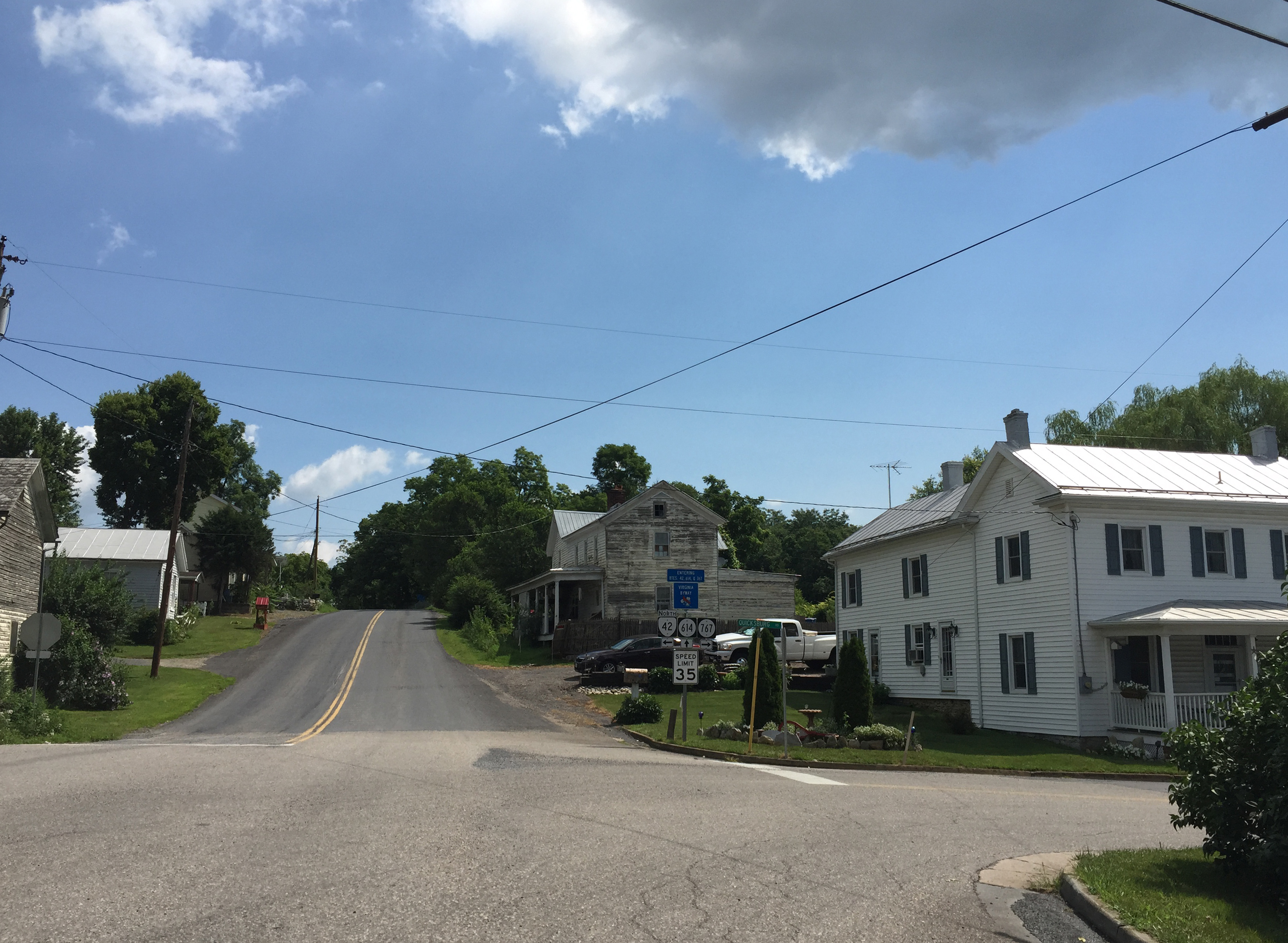
- Forestville
- Interactive map of Forestville
- Coordinates: 38°42′54″N 78°43′19″W
- Country: United States
- State: Virginia
- County: Shenandoah County

Forestville is a CDP in Shenandoah County, in the U.S. state of Virginia.

The Forestville Historic District was listed on the National Register of Historic Places in 2011.
