= Abraham Beydler House =

Historic house in Virginia, United States

- U.S. National Register of Historic Places
- Virginia Landmarks Register
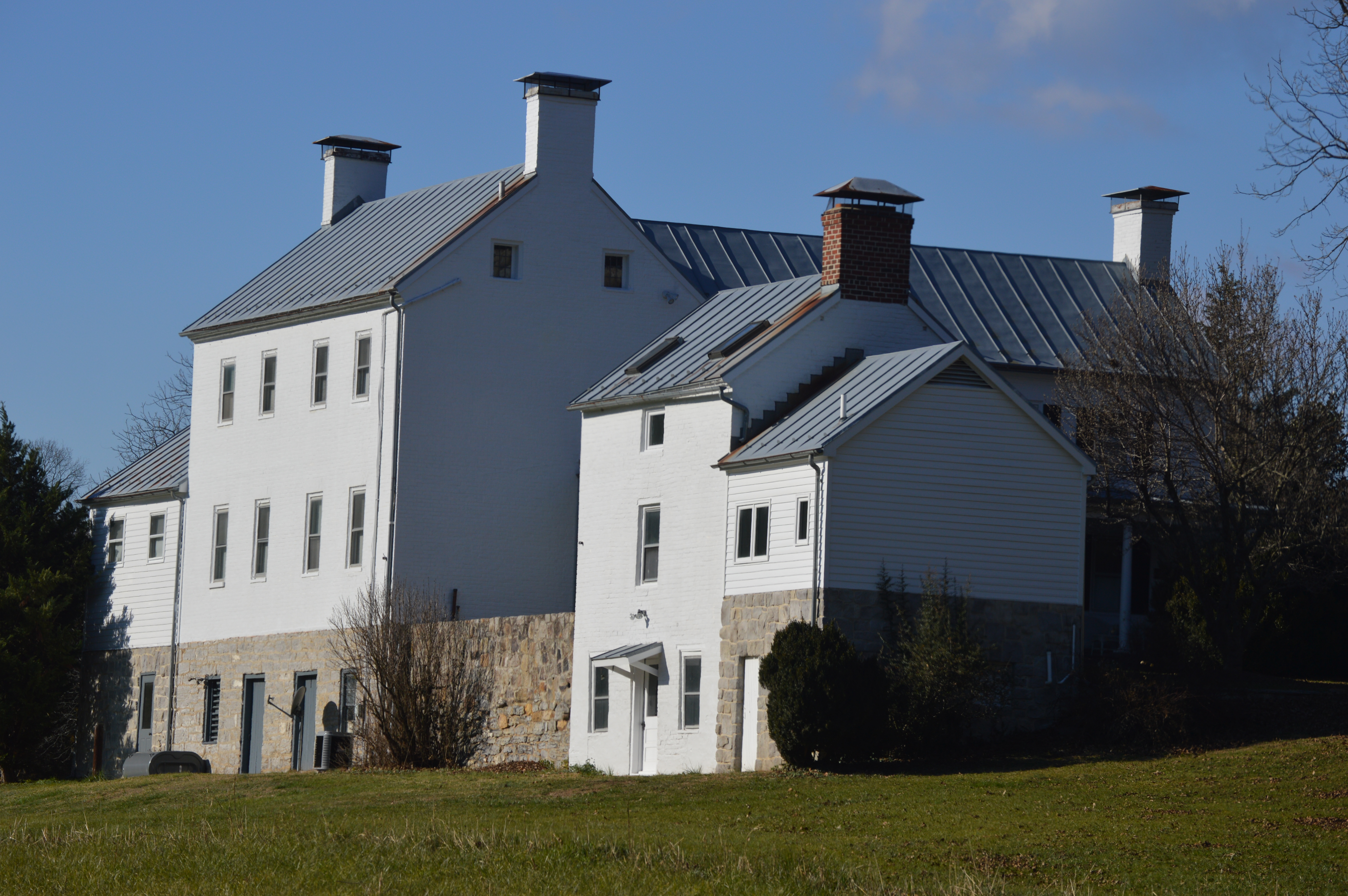
- Rear of the house

- Location within Virginia Location within the United States
- Location: 2748 Zion Church Rd., near Maurertown, Virginia
- Coordinates: 38°54′36″N 78°25′42″W
- Area: 9.3 acres (3.8 ha)
- Built: c. 1800
- Architectural style: Federal
- NRHP reference No.: 01001568
- VLR No.: 085-0096

Significant dates
- Added to NRHP: February 7, 2002
- Designated VLR: June 13, 2001

Abraham Beydler House, also known as Valhalla Farm, is a historic home located near Maurertown, Shenandoah County, Virginia. It was built about 1800, and is a two-story, six room, brick dwelling in the Federal style. It has a full basement and a two-story ell added perpendicularly to the house around 1850. Also on the property are the contributing smokehouse and the remains of a spring house. The house is representative of German immigrant adoption of the Federal style of architecture, popular among residents of the Shenandoah Valley.

It was listed on the National Register of Historic Places in 2002.
