= Benjamin Wierman House =

Historic house in Virginia, United States

- U.S. National Register of Historic Places
- Virginia Landmarks Register
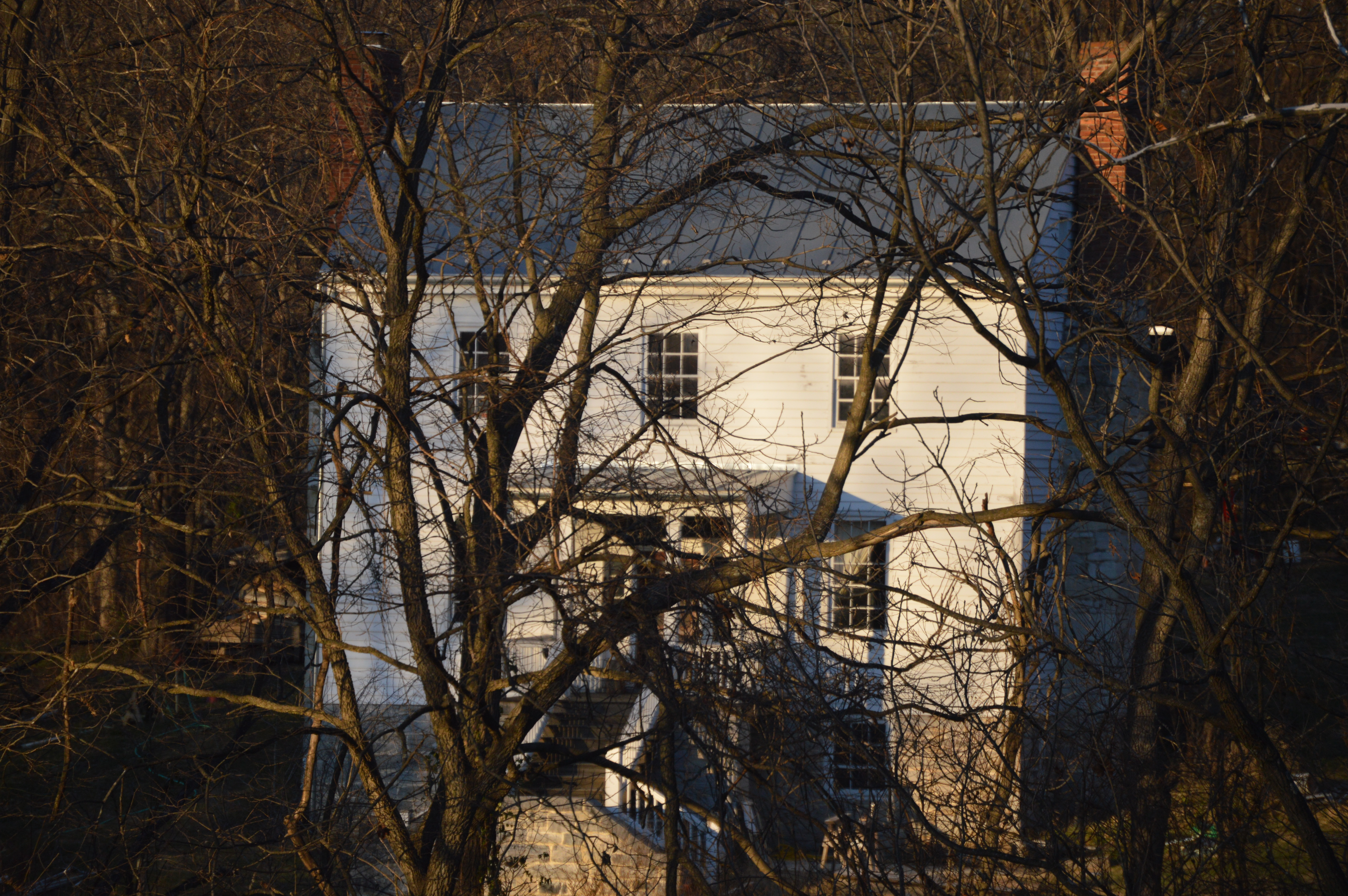
- Roadside view

- Location within Virginia Location within the United States
- Location: 4049 Flat Rock Rd., near Quicksburg, Virginia
- Coordinates: 38°42′57″N 78°45′27″W
- Area: 13 acres (5.3 ha)
- Built: 1859
- Architectural style: Greek Revival
- NRHP reference No.: 08000077
- VLR No.: 085-0037-0003

Significant dates
- Added to NRHP: February 21, 2008
- Designated VLR: September 14, 2005

Benjamin Wierman House, also known as the Gorman Lloyd House and Snapp House, is a historic home located near Quicksburg, Shenandoah County, Virginia. It was built in 1859, and is a two-story, frame I-house dwelling in the Greek Revival style. It sits on an English basement. The house features a long set of new wooden steps that lead up to a small front portico and massive cut limestone chimneys. Also on the property are the contributing one-story frame spring house with a loft, a small meat house, a frame chicken house, and a horse barn site.

It was listed on the National Register of Historic Places in 2008.
