= Forestville Historic District =

Historic district in Virginia, United States

- U.S. National Register of Historic Places
- U.S. Historic district
- Virginia Landmarks Register
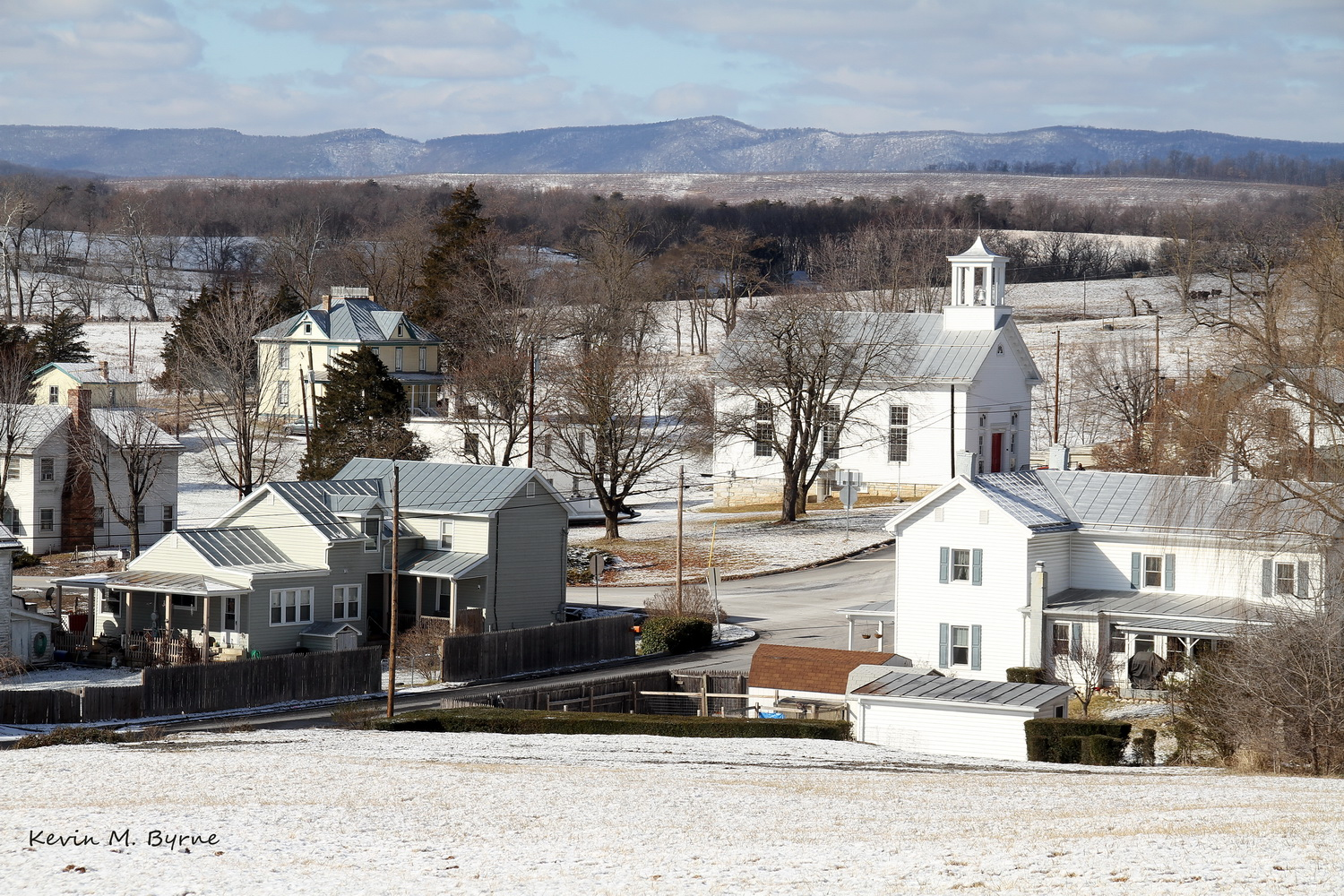

- Location within Virginia Location within the United States
- Location: Junction of VA 42, VA 614 & VA 767, Forestville, Virginia
- Coordinates: 38°42′50″N 78°43′26″W
- Area: 190 acres (77 ha)
- Built: c. 1736-1945
- Architect: Multiple
- Architectural style: Late 19th And 20th Century Movements, Greek Revival, Italianate, Queen Anne
- NRHP reference No.: 11000874
- VLR No.: 085-0405

Significant dates
- Added to NRHP: November 30, 2011
- Designated VLR: September 22, 2011

The Forestville Historic District is a national historic district located at Forestville, Shenandoah County, Virginia. The district encompasses 84 contributing buildings, 4 contributing sites, and 1 contributing structure in the 19th century mill village of Forestville. The vernacular buildings represent a variety of popular architectural styles including Greek Revival, Queen Anne, and Italianate. The buildings date from the late-18th to mid-20th centuries and primarily include log and wood-frame single dwellings, with domestic and agricultural dependencies, that dominate the district are substantiated by a gristmill, two commercial buildings. Also in the district are a church, a cemetery, a post office, two doctors' offices, and a school.

It was listed on the National Register of Historic Places in 2011.
