= Toms Brook School =

Historic school building in Virginia, US

- U.S. National Register of Historic Places
- Virginia Landmarks Register
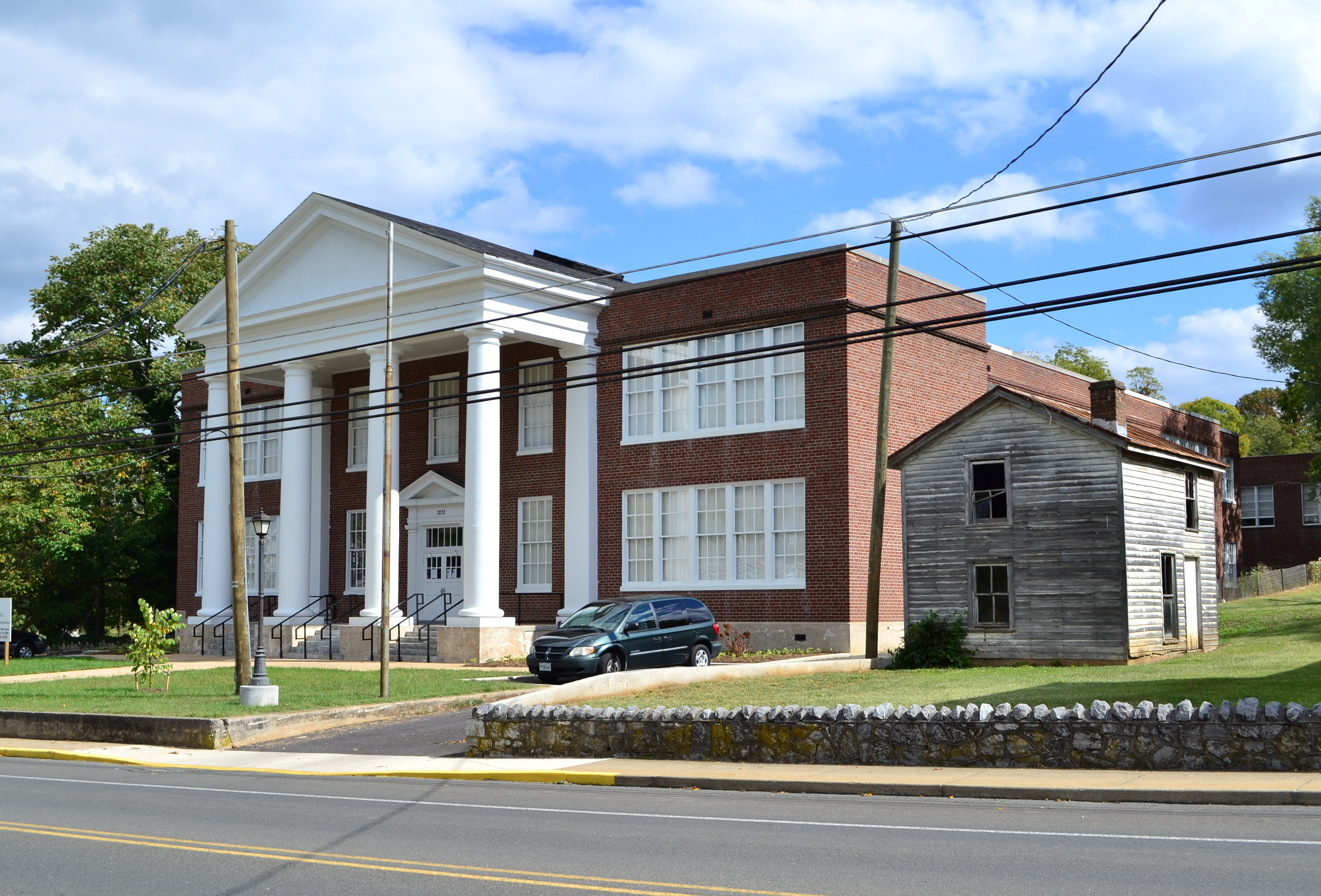
- Toms Brook School, September 2013

- Location within Virginia Location within the United States
- Location: 3232 S. Main St., Toms Brook, Virginia
- Coordinates: 38°56′38″N 78°26′38″W
- Area: 1.156 acres (0.468 ha)
- Built: c. 1935–1936, 1952
- Architect: Mims, James Raymond
- Architectural style: Colonial Revival
- NRHP reference No.: 11000554
- VLR No.: 313-5001

Significant dates
- Added to NRHP: August 18, 2011
- Designated VLR: June 16, 2011

Toms Brook School is a historic school building located at Toms Brook, Shenandoah County, Virginia. It was built in 1935–1936, and it is a two-story, T-shaped, red brick Colonial Revival-style school building. It features a monumental portico with tall columns that support the pediment.

The Virginia State Board of Education provided a $25,000 loan for its construction. The community also applied for $31,050 of Works Progress Administration funds for its construction, but the application was not approved. A cafeteria addition for the school was completed in 1952.

Toms Brook School "was one of many built in the county during a major modernization program. Grades 1-12 were originally housed in the school. Students attended primary school in their own communities. They then traveled to town to attend High School, Grades 8-12, if they could afford the tuition."

"In 1959 the county built three new consolidated High Schools. At that time all elementary schools in the area [surrounding Toms Brook] were consolidated into the Toms Brook School."

In the 1980s, grades 5-7 moved to Woodstock and Strasburg. In 1991, new additions were completed at the county’s elementary schools, and Toms Brook School was closed.

Toms Brook School was listed on the National Register of Historic Places in 2011.

It was sold to several private developers but was eventually acquired by People Inc. who converted the property into low-income housing.
