= Jacob Bowman House =

Historic house in Virginia, United States

- U.S. National Register of Historic Places
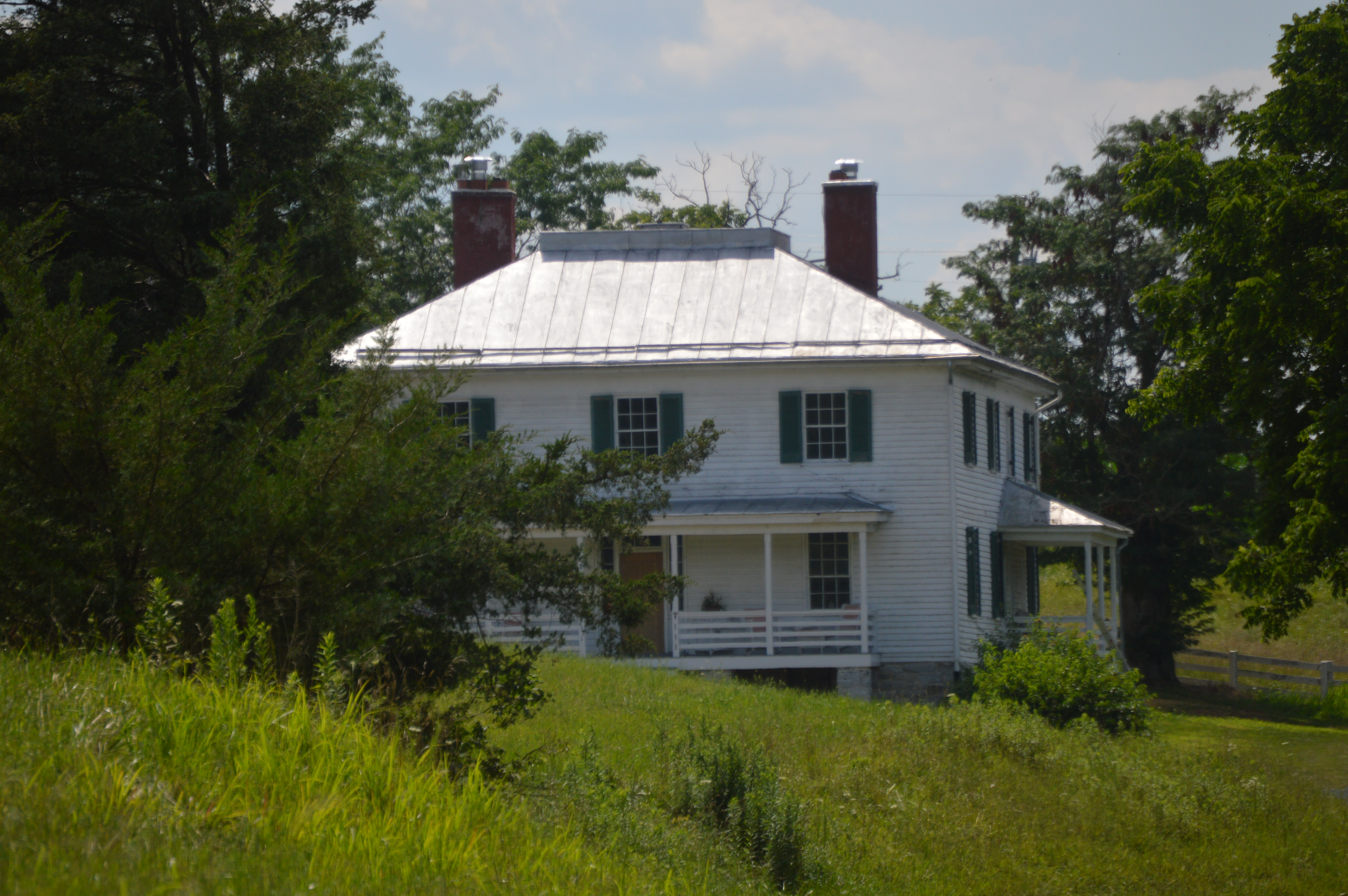

- Location within Virginia Location within the United States
- Location: 2470 Polk Rd., near Edinburg, Virginia
- Coordinates: 38°48′49″N 78°36′34″W
- Area: 6 acres (2.4 ha)
- Built: c. 1840
- Architectural style: Greek Revival
- NRHP reference No.: 100000679
- Added to NRHP: February 21, 2017

The Jacob Bowman House is a historic house at 2470 Polk Road in rural south-central Shenandoah County, Virginia, southwest of Edinburg. It is a two-story wood-frame structure, with a truncated hip roof and weatherboard siding. It was built about 1840, and is a good early example of vernacular Greek Revival architecture in the county. The property also includes a 19th-century bank barn and other outbuildings, as well as the remains of an early springhouse.

The house was listed on the National Register of Historic Places in 2017.
