= Maurertown, Virginia =

Census-designated place in Virginia, U.S.

Coordinates: 38°55′47″N 78°27′49″W

Maurertown (/'mɒritaʊn/ or /'mɒrɪtaʊn/ MOR-ee-town or MOR-i-town) is a census-designated place (CDP) in Shenandoah County, Virginia, United States. As of the 2020 census, Maurertown had a population of 973.

The Abraham Beydler House and Shenandoah County Farm are listed on the National Register of Historic Places.

== Demographics ==
Historical population
| Census | Pop. | Note | %± |
|---|---|---|---|
| 2010 | 770 | | — |
| 2020 | 973 | | 26.4% |
U.S. Decennial Census; 2010 2020

Maurertown was first listed as a census designated place in the 2010 U.S. census.
