= Shenandoah County Courthouse =

- U.S. National Register of Historic Places
- Virginia Landmarks Register
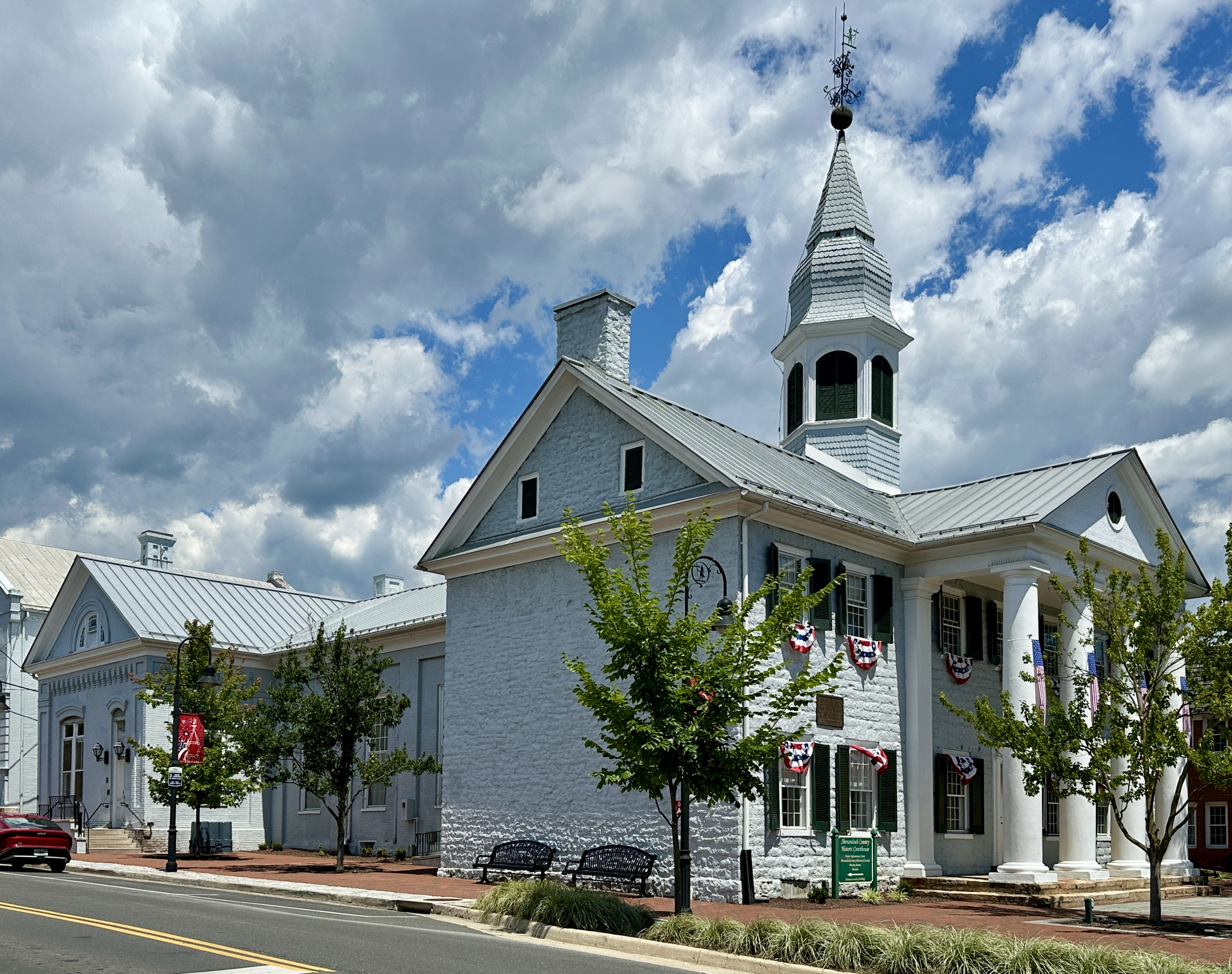
- Shenandoah County Courthouse in 2026

- Location within Virginia Location within the United States
- Interactive map showing the location of Shenandoah County Courthouse
- Location: W. Court and S. Main Sts., Woodstock, Virginia
- Coordinates: 38°52′55″N 78°30′20″W
- Area: 9 acres (3.6 ha)
- Built: c. 1790, c. 1840, 1880, 1929
- Architectural style: Greek Revival
- NRHP reference No.: 73002060
- VLR No.: 330-0002

Significant dates
- Added to NRHP: June 19, 1973
- Designated VLR: June 19, 1973

Shenandoah County Courthouse is a historic courthouse building located at Woodstock, Shenandoah County, Virginia. It was built about 1790, as a single-pile, two-story, seven-bay, structure with a facade of rough-hewn coursed limestone ashlar. A projecting tetrastyle Tuscan portico was added in 1929 to the central three bays. Atop the gable roof is a handsome hexagonal cupola with ogee-shaped roof above the belfry and surmounted by a short spire topped by a ball finial. A one-story Greek Revival style rear wing was added about 1840; a one-story clerk's office was added in 1880.

It was listed on the National Register of Historic Places in 1973.

The Shenandoah County Historical Society and County Tourism office operate the Visitor Center and Courthouse Museum in the historic courthouse.
