= Battle of Tom's Brook =

1864 battle of the American Civil War

Coordinates: 38.9429°N 78.4458°W

- Part of the American Civil War
Date	October 9, 1864
Location	Shenandoah County, Virginia
Result	Union victory

Belligerents
United States (Union)	(Confederate States of America) CSA (Confederacy)

Commanders and leaders
Alfred Torbert	Thomas L. Rosser

Strength
6,300	3,500

Casualties and losses
57	350

The Battle of Tom's Brook was fought on October 9, 1864, near Tom's Brook in Shenandoah County, Virginia, during Philip Sheridan's Shenandoah Valley Campaign of the American Civil War. It resulted in a significant Union victory, one that was mockingly dubbed the Woodstock Races for the speed of the Confederate withdrawal.

After his victory at Fisher's Hill, Maj. Gen. Philip Sheridan pursued Jubal A. Early's Confederate army up the Shenandoah Valley to near Staunton. On October 6, Sheridan began withdrawing, as his cavalry burned everything that could be deemed of military significance, including barns and mills. Reinforced by Maj. Gen. Joseph B. Kershaw's division, Early followed. Maj. Gen. Thomas L. Rosser arrived from Petersburg to take command of Maj. Gen. Fitzhugh Lee's Confederate cavalry division and harassed the retreating Federals. On October 9, Brig. Gen. Alfred Torbert's Union troopers turned on their pursuers, routing the divisions of Rosser, whose cavalrymen were repulsed by Custer in a flanking maneuver along the base of Spiker's Hill off of Back Road, and Lunsford L. Lomax, who was positioned in the vicinity of the Valley Pike, at Tom's Brook. With this victory, the Union cavalry attained overwhelming superiority in the Valley.

That's General Custer, the Yanks are so proud of,
and I intend to give him the best whipping today that he ever got,

— Confederate Major General Tom Rosser on the eve of the battle.

Jubal Early later commented sourly about Rosser's Laurel Brigade, "The laurel is a running vine".

== Battlefield preservation ==
The American Battlefield Trust and its partners have acquired and preserved 516 acres (2.09 km^{2}) of the Tom's Brook battlefield.

== See also ==
- Edward R. Hanford – Union private, capturer of the 32nd Battalion Virginia Cavalry battle flag
