= Toms Brook, Virginia =

- Town
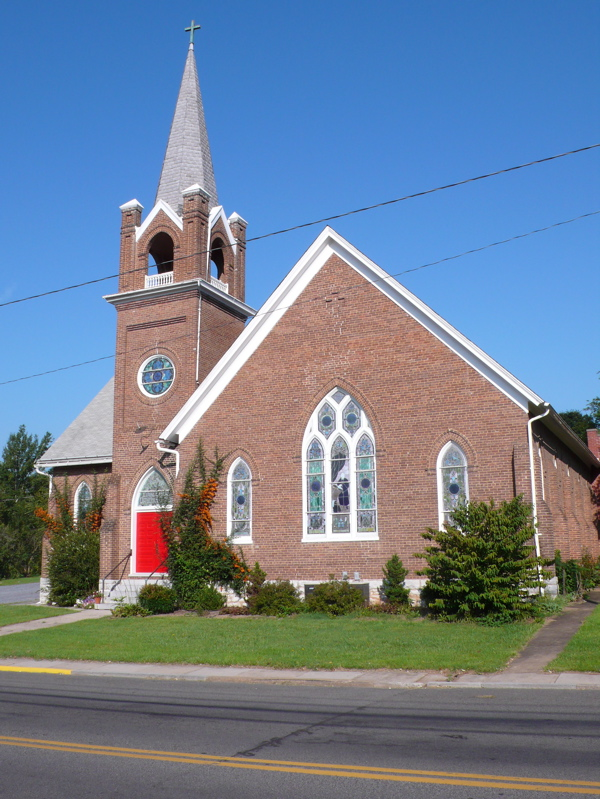
- St. Peter's Lutheran Church (1904)

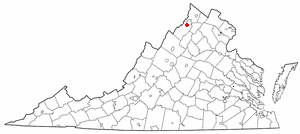
- Location of Toms Brook, Virginia
- Coordinates: 38°56′50″N 78°26′23″W
- Country: United States
- State: Virginia
- County: Shenandoah

Area
  - Total: 0.13 sq mi (0.33 km^{2})
  - Land: 0.13 sq mi (0.33 km^{2})
  - Water: 0 sq mi (0.00 km^{2})
- Elevation: 702 ft (214 m)

Population (2020)
  - Total: 276
  - Estimate (2019): 272
  - Density: 2,157.3/sq mi (832.95/km^{2})
- Time zone: UTC−5 (Eastern (EST))
  - Summer (DST): UTC−4 (EDT)
- ZIP code: 22660
- Area code: 540
- FIPS code: 51-79024
- GNIS feature ID: 1500231
- Website: https://www.tomsbrookva.net/

Toms Brook is a town in Shenandoah County, Virginia, United States. As of the 2020 census, Toms Brook had a population of 276.

== History ==
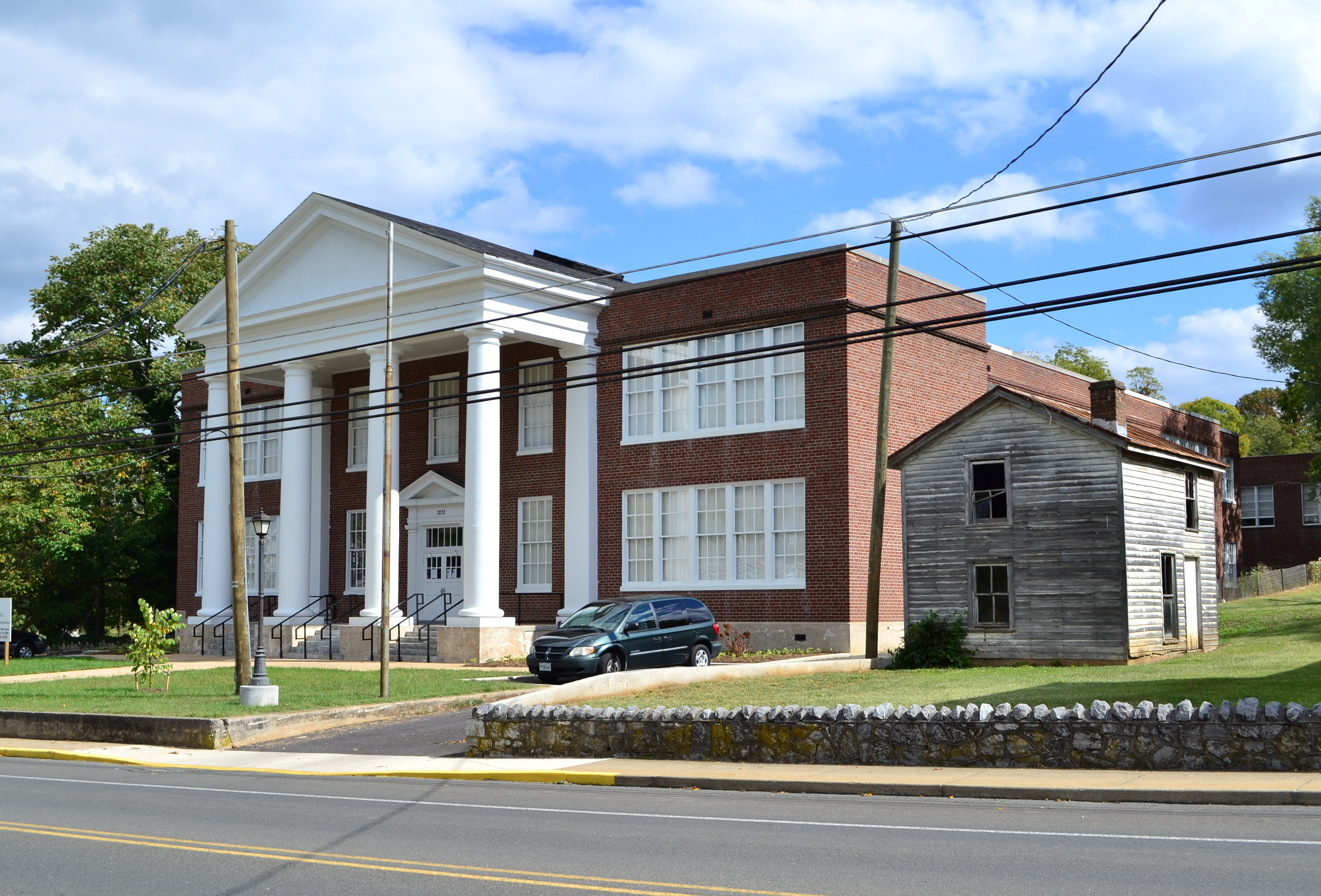
Toms Brook School

During the American Civil War, the Battle of Tom's Brook was fought nearby, a Union victory that became dubbed "the Woodstock Races."

The Toms Brook School was listed on the National Register of Historic Places in 2011.

== Geography ==
Toms Brook is located at 38°56′50″N 78°26′23″W (38.947214, −78.439657).

According to the United States Census Bureau, the town has a total area of 0.2 square mile (0.4 km^{2}), all land.

=== Climate ===
The climate in this area is characterized by hot, humid summers and generally mild to cool winters. According to the Köppen Climate Classification system, Toms Brook has a humid subtropical climate, abbreviated "Cfa" on climate maps.

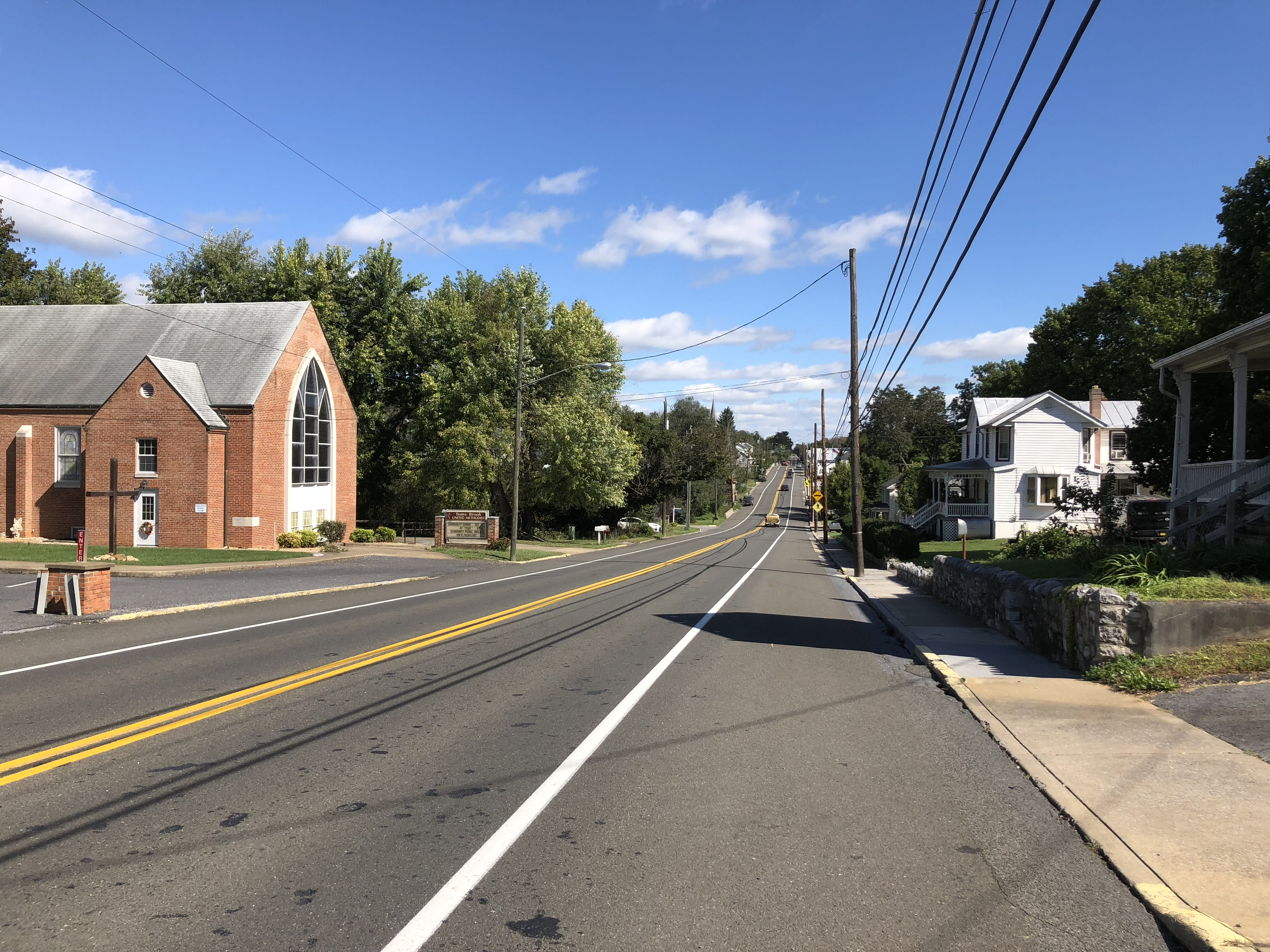
US 11 in Toms Brook

== Transportation ==
U.S. Route 11 is the only significant highway directly serving Toms Brook. US 11 serves as a local service road for nearby Interstate 81. The closest interchange on I-81 is Exit 291, which connects to Toms Brook via US 11 and Mount Olive Road (SR 651).

== Demographics ==
Historical population
Census	Pop.	Note	%±
1860	598		—
1930	240		—
1940	219		−8.7%
1950	256		16.9%
1960	244		−4.7%
1970	258		5.7%
1980	226		−12.4%
1990	227		0.4%
2000	255		12.3%
2010	258		1.2%
2020	276		7.0%
U.S. Decennial Census

At the 2000 census there were 255 people, 100 households, and 70 families living in the town. The population density was 1,652.4 people per square mile (656.4/km^{2}). There were 103 housing units at an average density of 667.4 per square mile (265.1/km^{2}). The racial makeup of the town was 94.90% White, 1.18% African American, 0.78% Native American, 0.39% from other races, and 2.75% from two or more races. Hispanic or Latino of any race were 0.78%.

Of the 100 households 30.0% had children under the age of 18 living with them, 53.0% were married couples living together, 12.0% had a female householder with no husband present, and 30.0% were non-families. 24.0% of households were one person and 10.0% were one person aged 65 or older. The average household size was 2.55 and the average family size was 3.07.

The age distribution was 22.4% under the age of 18, 9.4% from 18 to 24, 32.5% from 25 to 44, 26.3% from 45 to 64, and 9.4% 65 or older. The median age was 37 years. For every 100 females, there were 90.3 males. For every 100 females aged 18 and over, there were 90.4 males.

The median household income was $38,214 and the median family income was $44,688. Males had a median income of $27,750 versus $20,972 for females. The per capita income for the town was $16,712. About 2.5% of families and 5.9% of the population were below the poverty line, including 3.4% of those under the age of eighteen and none of those sixty-five or over.
