= Steve Sabins =

American college baseball head coach at West Virginia University

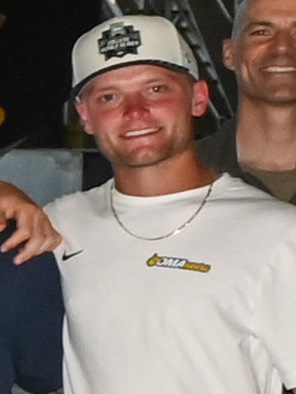
- Sabins with West Virginia in 2026

Current position
- Title: Head coach
- Team: West Virginia
- Conference: Big 12
- Record: 91–33 (.734)
- Annual salary: $550,000

Biographical details
- Born: May 11, 1987 (age 39); Austin, Texas, U.S.
- Education: Embry–Riddle Aeronautical University

Playing career
- 2007: Angelina College
- 2008: Daytona State
- 2009: Oklahoma State
- 2010–2011: Embry–Riddle
- Position: Third baseman

Coaching career (HC unless noted)
- 2012–2013: Oklahoma State (GA)
- 2014–2015: Oklahoma State (asst.)
- 2016–2024: West Virginia (asst.)
- 2025–present: West Virginia

Administrative career (AD unless noted)
- 2013: Charles Town Cannons (GM)

Head coaching record
- Overall: 91–33 (.734)
- Tournaments: NCAA: 10–4 (.714); Big 12: 3–2 (.600)

Accomplishments and honors

Championships
- As head coach: Big 12 regular season (2025); 2x NCAA Regional (2025, 2026); CWS Appearance (2026); As assistant: 2x Big 12 (2014, 2023); 2x NCAA Regional (2014, 2024)

Awards
- 2x ABCA East Region Coach of the Year (2025, 2026); NCBWA Coach of the Year (2026)

Steve Sabins (born May 11, 1987) is an American college baseball coach. He is the current head baseball coach of the West Virginia Mountaineers.

== Coaching career ==
Sabins began his coaching career at Oklahoma State University, where he served as a graduate assistant during the 2012 and 2013 seasons. During his time with the Cowboys, he managed the video analysis program and scouted both game and practice footage. He provided feedback to hitters, infielders, and pitchers, while also preparing scouting reports. Additionally, Sabins helped coordinate Dugout Club events and implemented an academic accountability system to improve individual and team academic performance.

In 2013, Sabins became the general manager of the Charles Town Cannons in their inaugural season in the Valley Baseball League. Under his leadership, the Cannons reached the postseason, becoming the only expansion team in league history to qualify for the playoffs in their first year. Sabins was instrumental in assembling the roster, recruiting collegiate players, hiring the coaching staff, and working with marketing personnel and city officials in Charles Town, West Virginia.

Prior to that, Sabins served as the head coach of the Winchester Royals in the Valley Baseball League in 2012. That season, the Royals set league records for home runs and RBIs. In 2011, he was head coach of the Leesburg Thunder in the Futures Wood Bat League, leading the team to both a regular season title and a World Series championship.

=== West Virginia ===
Steve Sabins joined the West Virginia Mountaineers coaching staff in 2016 after spending four seasons at Oklahoma State, where he contributed to multiple aspects of the program from 2012 to 2015.

Sabins was officially introduced as the 20th head coach in WVU baseball history on June 21, 2024, following the retirement of head coach Randy Mazey. Sabins had been a member of the Mountaineers’ coaching staff for nine seasons prior to his promotion, serving in roles including assistant coach, recruiting coordinator, and associate head coach.

In his first season at the helm in 2025, Sabins guided the Mountaineers to a 44–16 overall record, capturing the program's first outright Big 12 regular season championship and advancing to the NCAA Super Regionals. West Virginia began the season with a 13–0 start and remained ranked in the national top 25 throughout the year, finishing in the top 15 of several final polls.

The Mountaineers posted a 19–9 record in Big 12 play, securing the outright conference title one year after sharing the championship in 2023.

The team advanced to the NCAA Tournament, where they were placed in the Clemson Regional. West Virginia won all three games in the regional, including a dramatic 13–12 victory over Kentucky, to advance to the NCAA Super Regionals for the second consecutive year, where they faced the No. 6 LSU Tigers, losing in two games to the eventual national champions.

Sabins was named the ABCA East Region Coach of the Year, becoming the sixth WVU head coach to receive the honor. Several players received postseason accolades, including four All-Big 12 selections: Griffin Kirn (First Team), Logan Sauve (First Team), Jack Kartsonas (Second Team), and Kyle West (Second Team). Sam White was also named to the ABCA All-East Region First Team.

== Head coaching record ==
Below is a table of Sabin's yearly records as an NCAA baseball coach.

Record table
Season	Team	Overall	Conference	Standing	Postseason
West Virginia Mountaineers (Big 12 Conference) (2025–present)
2025	West Virginia	44–16	19–9	1st	NCAA Super Regional
2026	West Virginia	47–17	21–9	2nd	College World Series
West Virginia:		91–33 (.734)	40–18 (.690)		
Total:		91–33 (.734)			
National champion Postseason invitational champion Conference regular season champion Conference regular season and conference tournament champion Division regular season champion Division regular season and conference tournament champion Conference tournament champion
