= Luke Berryhill =

American baseball player (born 1998)

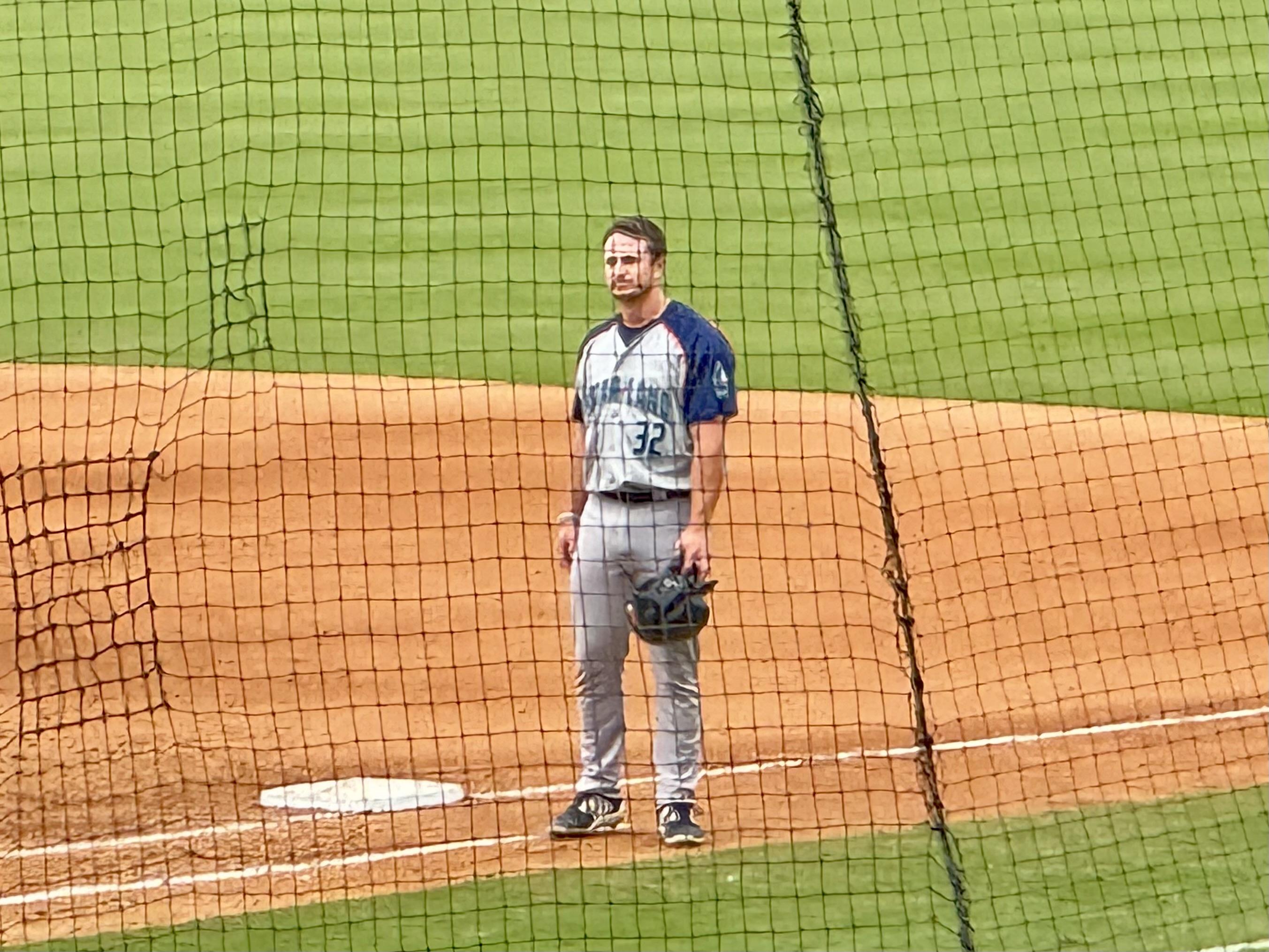

Piratas de Campeche
- Catcher
- Born: May 28, 1998 (age 28); Atlanta, Georgia, U.S.
- Bats: Right Throws: Right

Lucas Dean Berryhill (born May 28, 1998) is an American professional baseball catcher for the Piratas de Campeche of the Mexican League.

== Amateur career ==
Berryhill began his college career at Georgia Southern. After his freshman year he transferred to Walters State Community College. In his only season with the Senators, Berryhill batted .376 with 11 doubles, 13 home runs, and 45 RBI. In 2018, he played collegiate summer baseball with the Purcellville Cannons of the Valley Baseball League, and then 2019, he played for the Brewster Whitecaps of the Cape Cod Baseball League. Berryhill transferred to South Carolina for his remaining eligibility. As a junior he hit .271 with 12 home runs and 49 RBI.

== Professional career ==
=== Cincinnati Reds ===
Berryhill was drafted in the 13th round, with the 384th overall selection, by the Cincinnati Reds in the 2019 Major League Baseball draft. After signing with the team he was assigned to the Greeneville Reds of the Low–A Appalachian League, where he batted .240 in eight games played. Berryhill did not play in a game in 2020 due to the cancellation of the minor league season because of the COVID-19 pandemic.

=== Houston Astros ===
Berryhill was traded to the Houston Astros in exchange for pitcher Cionel Pérez on January 23, 2021. Berryhill began the 2021 season with the Low-A Fayetteville Woodpeckers. He was later promoted to the Asheville Tourists of High-A East and then promoted a second time to the Double-A Corpus Christi Hooks. In 73 total games, Berryhill hit .295/.413/.562 with 15 home runs and 54 RBI.

Berryhill spent the 2022 campaign with Corpus Christi, also appearing in three games for the rookie–level Florida Complex League Astros. In 96 games for the Hooks, he slashed .256/.380/.409 with 12 home runs and 60 RBI. Berryhill spent the 2023 season with the Triple–A Sugar Land Space Cowboys, hitting .228/.371/.384 with eight home runs and 28 RBI across 77 appearances.

He returned to Sugar Land in 2024, batting .234/.332/.370 with six home runs and 30 RBI across 57 games. Berryhill was released by the Astros organization on July 24, 2024.

=== Lake Country DockHounds ===
On August 29, 2024, Berryhill signed with the Lake Country DockHounds of the American Association of Professional Baseball. In 5 games for the team, he went 1-for-13 (.077) with 1 RBI and 3 walks.

=== Piratas de Campeche ===
On March 7, 2025, Berryhill signed with the Piratas de Campeche of the Mexican League.

== Personal life ==
Aside from playing professional baseball, Berryhill is also a country music singer. He dropped his debut single "Dance on It" in 2023. A song detailing his life in the minor leagues, titled "Road to the Show", was announced in February 2024.
