= Guido Knudson =

American baseball player (born 1989)

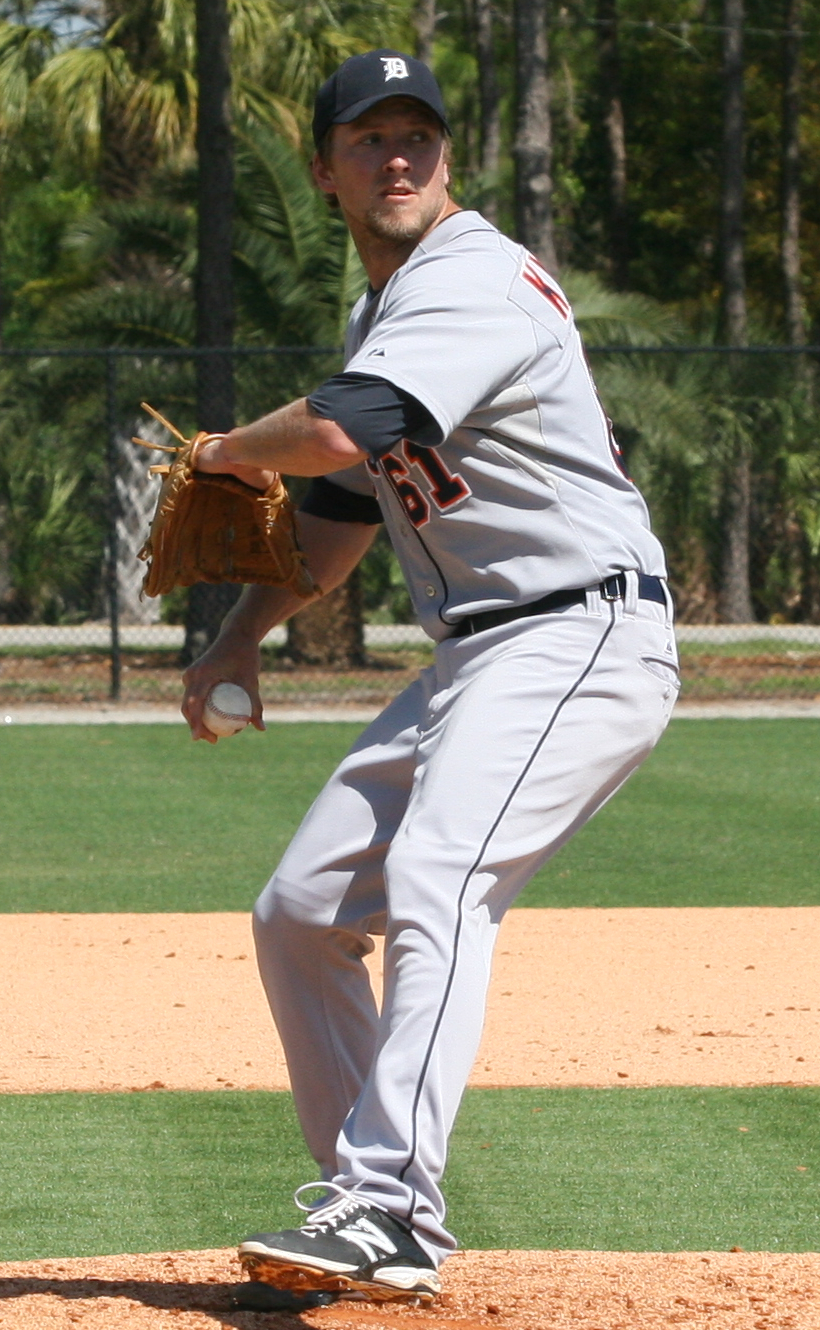
- Knudson with the Detroit Tigers in 2014 spring training
- Pitcher
- Born: August 5, 1989 (age 36); Bonita, California, U.S.
- Batted: Right Threw: Right

MLB debut
- August 22, 2015, for the Detroit Tigers

Last appearance
- September 2, 2015, for the Detroit Tigers

MLB statistics
- Win–loss record: 0–0
- Earned run average: 18.00
- Strikeouts: 6
- Stats at Baseball Reference

Teams
- Detroit Tigers (2015)

Guido Joel Knudson (/ˈɡiːdoʊ kəˈnuːdsən/; born August 5, 1989) is an American former professional baseball pitcher. He played in Major League Baseball (MLB) for the Detroit Tigers.

== Early life ==
Prior to playing professionally, Knudson attended Bonita Vista High School and then the University of California, San Diego. During his tenure at the university, he pitched for the North Adams SteepleCats of the New England Collegiate Baseball League and he also played for the Woodstock River Bandits of the Valley Baseball League, earning an All-Star selection in 2009. He earned All-West and All-CCAA honors in 2011.

== Career ==
=== Detroit Tigers ===
The Detroit Tigers selected Knudson in the 28th round of the 2011 Major League Baseball draft and he pitched for the GCL Tigers and Connecticut Tigers that year, posting a 3.42 ERA in 18 games. In 2012, he had a 3.86 ERA in 16 games between the Lakeland Flying Tigers and West Michigan Whitecaps and in 2013, he had a 1.79 ERA in 42 games for the Whitecaps. Between Lakeland and the Erie SeaWolves in 2014, he had a 3.99 ERA with seven saves in 40 appearances. One observer noted he has a "slider that is about MLB average" and that he "may cut out an MLB career for himself."

On August 20, 2015, the Tigers purchased the contract of Knudson from the Toledo Mud Hens after placing starters Aníbal Sánchez and Daniel Norris on the disabled list. Prior to being called up by the Tigers, Knudson had a 1–2 record and a 2.52 ERA in 30 appearances with the Mud Hens, allowing 27 hits over 39 1/3 innings, with 21 walks and 40 strikeouts. Knudson made his major league debut on August 22, in a game against the Texas Rangers. In his debut, he pitched one inning, allowing one hit, a home run to Rougned Odor, with two strikeouts and no walks. Knudson became the first pitcher since at least 1914 to give up a home run in each of his first four Major League relief appearances.

=== Pittsburgh Pirates ===
On November 9, 2015, Knudson was claimed off waivers by the Pittsburgh Pirates. He was released in January 2016, but was re-signed the same month. He was released again on June 17.

=== Seattle Mariners ===
On July 3, 2016, Knudson signed a minor league deal with the Seattle Mariners. He elected free agency on October 6, 2016.

Knudson retired from professional baseball in April 2017.
