= Kyle Snyder (baseball) =

American baseball player and coach (born 1977)

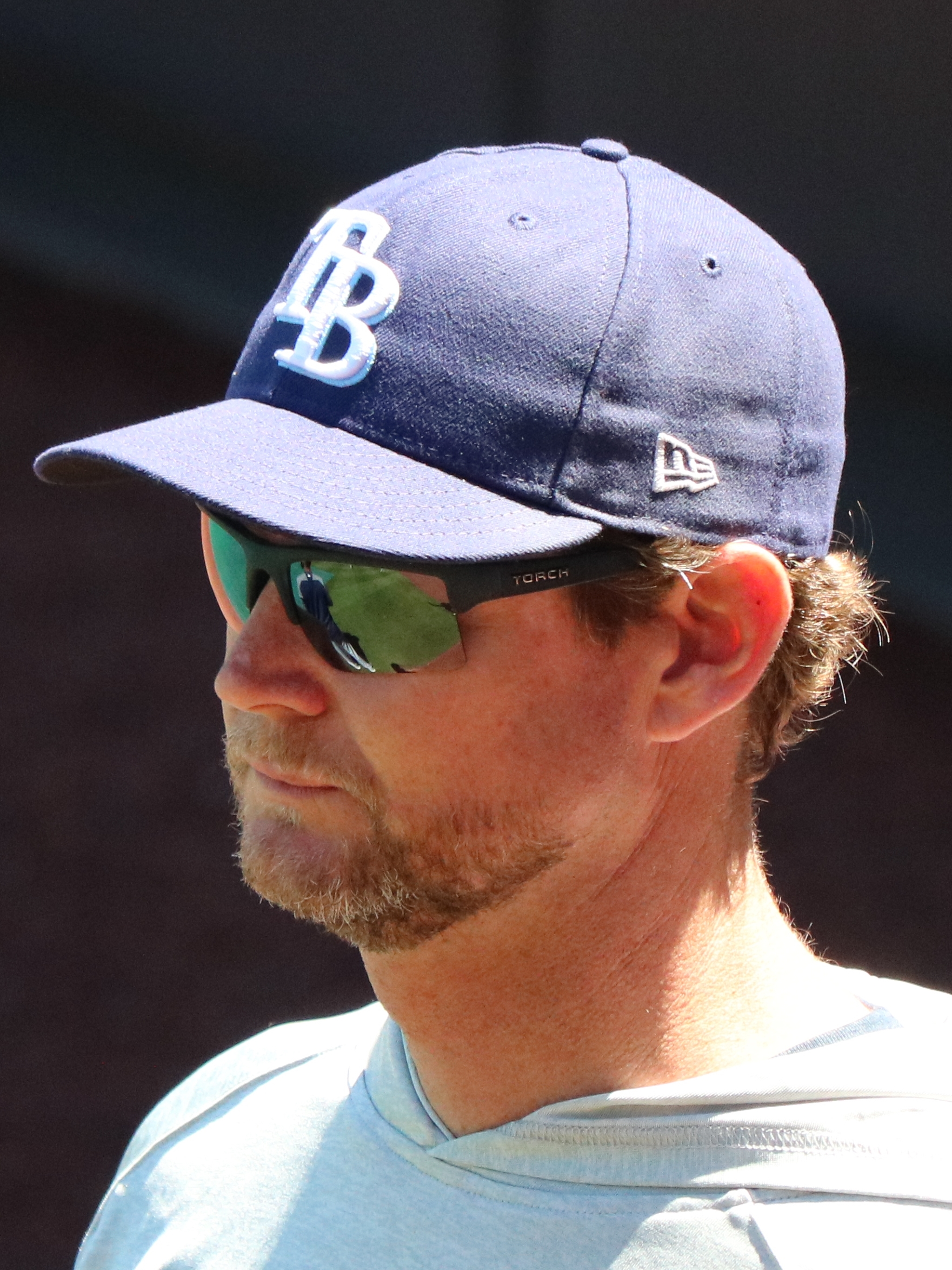
- Snyder with the Rays in 2018

Tampa Bay Rays – No. 23
- Pitcher / Pitching coach
- Born: September 9, 1977 (age 48); Houston, Texas, U.S.
- Batted: Switch Threw: Right

MLB debut
- May 1, 2003, for the Kansas City Royals

Last MLB appearance
- April 5, 2008, for the Boston Red Sox

MLB statistics
- Win–loss record: 8–17
- Earned run average: 5.57
- Strikeouts: 157
- Stats at Baseball Reference

Teams
- As player: Kansas City Royals (2003, 2005–2006); Boston Red Sox (2006–2008); As coach: Tampa Bay Rays (2018–present)

Kyle Ehren Snyder (born September 9, 1977) is an American former professional baseball relief pitcher and current pitching coach for the Tampa Bay Rays of Major League Baseball (MLB). He played for the Kansas City Royals and the Boston Red Sox. During his playing days, Snyder stood 6 feet 7 inches (2.01 m) tall, weighing 225 pounds (102 kg).

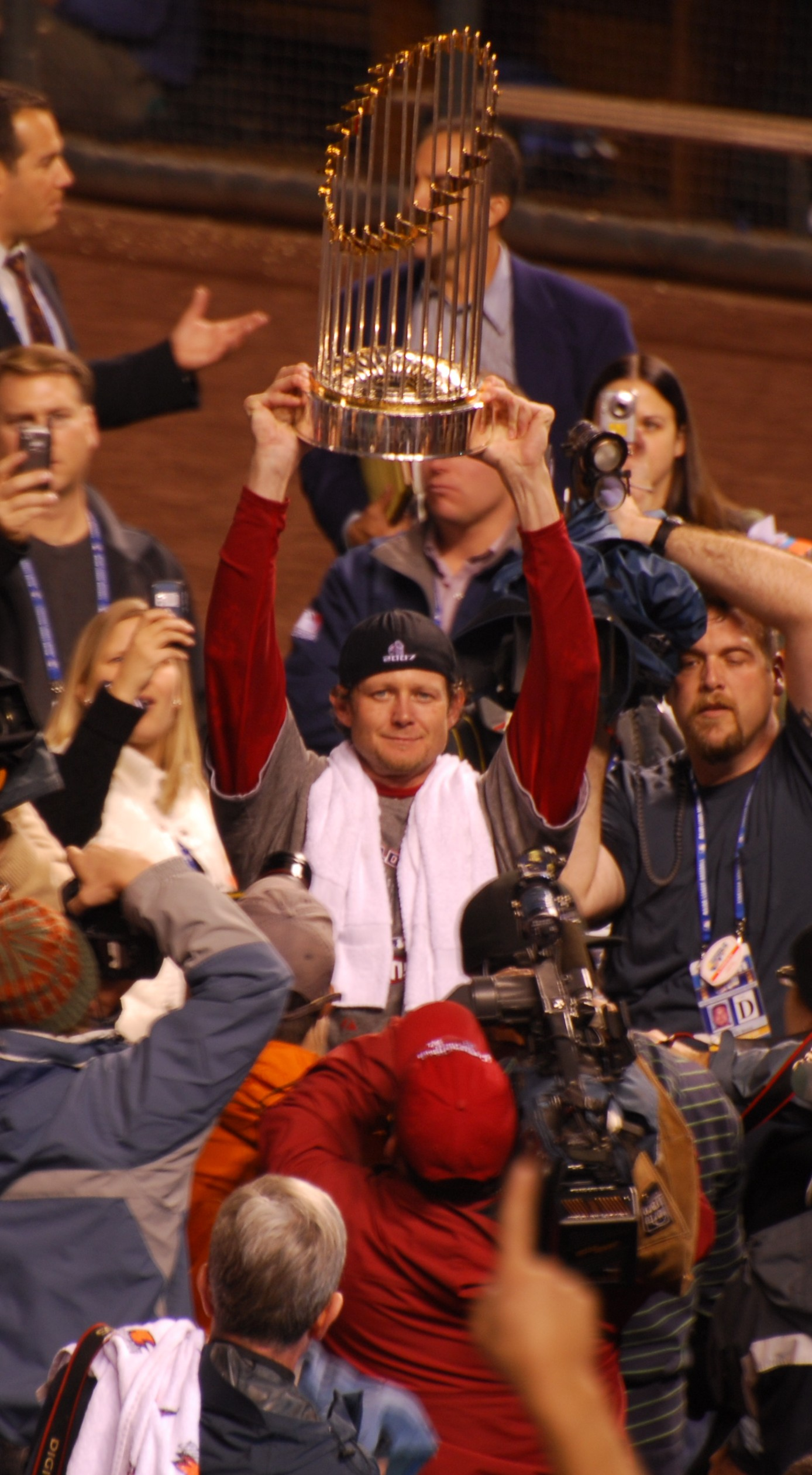
Snyder with the 2007 World Series trophy as a member of the Boston Red Sox

== Background ==
Snyder was born in Houston, Texas. He graduated from Riverview High School in Sarasota, Florida in 1996. While in high school, Snyder lettered in baseball, basketball, swimming, and golf. He was drafted by the Tampa Bay Devil Rays in the 1996 amateur draft; however, Snyder chose to attend North Carolina instead, where he played college baseball for the Tar Heels.

Snyder played three years for North Carolina, and in 1998 played collegiate summer baseball for the Chatham Athletics of the Cape Cod Baseball League where he was named the top prospect. In summer 1997, Snyder played in the Valley Baseball League, for the Winchester Royals.

== Professional career ==
In 1999, Snyder was a first round MLB draft pick (7th overall) of the Kansas City Royals. He played for the Spokane Indians in 1999 and was named top prospect in the Northwest League by Baseball America.

Snyder’s career with the Royals was hampered by several injuries. He only pitched two games in 2000 and missed the entire 2001 minor league season recovering from Tommy John surgery. Between 2003 and 2005, Snyder was on the disabled list four times including two stays on the 60-day disabled list, missing the entire 2004 season after having surgery to repair a torn labrum in his right shoulder. Despite his history with injuries, Snyder was named the seventh-best prospect in the organization by Baseball America in 2003.

Snyder started the 2006 season with the Royals' Triple-A affiliate, the Omaha Royals, and was promoted to the major leagues on June 8, 2006, to face the Texas Rangers. After giving up nine runs (five earned) and ten hits in a two inning start, he was designated for assignment.

In June 2006, Snyder was claimed off waivers by the Boston Red Sox. He split the remainder of the season between Boston and the Pawtucket Red Sox.

Snyder is perhaps best known in Boston for his 4 1/3 inning relief effort for the Red Sox in a July 31, 2006 game against the Cleveland Indians. Entering the game with Boston trailing 8-6 in the fifth inning, Snyder held the Indians scoreless before David Ortiz hit a walk-off three-run homer in the bottom of the ninth inning, giving the Red Sox a stunning 9-8 victory. Snyder allowed only one hit while walking none and striking out six.

Snyder's first full season in the big leagues was in 2007, when he appeared in 46 games, one more than his previous three professional years combined. In January 2008, Snyder signed a one-year contract with the Red Sox avoiding the arbitration process.

In April 2008, Snyder was designated for assignment to make room for Josh Beckett, who was returning from the 15-day disabled list. Later in the month, Snyder accepted an assignment to remain in the Red Sox organization with Triple-A Pawtucket. He was granted free agency after the 2008 season and signed a minor league contract with the New York Mets in January 2009. After playing sparingly through the 2011 season, for multiple minor league teams, Snyder retired as an active player.

== Coaching ==
In 2012, the Tampa Bay Rays hired Snyder as pitching coach for the Low-A Hudson Valley Renegades.

Starting the 2013 season, Snyder was the pitching coach for the Single-A Bowling Green Hot Rods. The Rays promoted him to the Durham Bulls for the 2015 season. The Rays promoted him to be the MLB pitching coach for the 2018 season, replacing longtime pitching coach Jim Hickey.

Sporting positions
Preceded by Jim Hickey	Tampa Bay Rays pitching coach 2018	Succeeded by Incumbent
