= Cionel Pérez =

Cuban baseball player (born 1996)

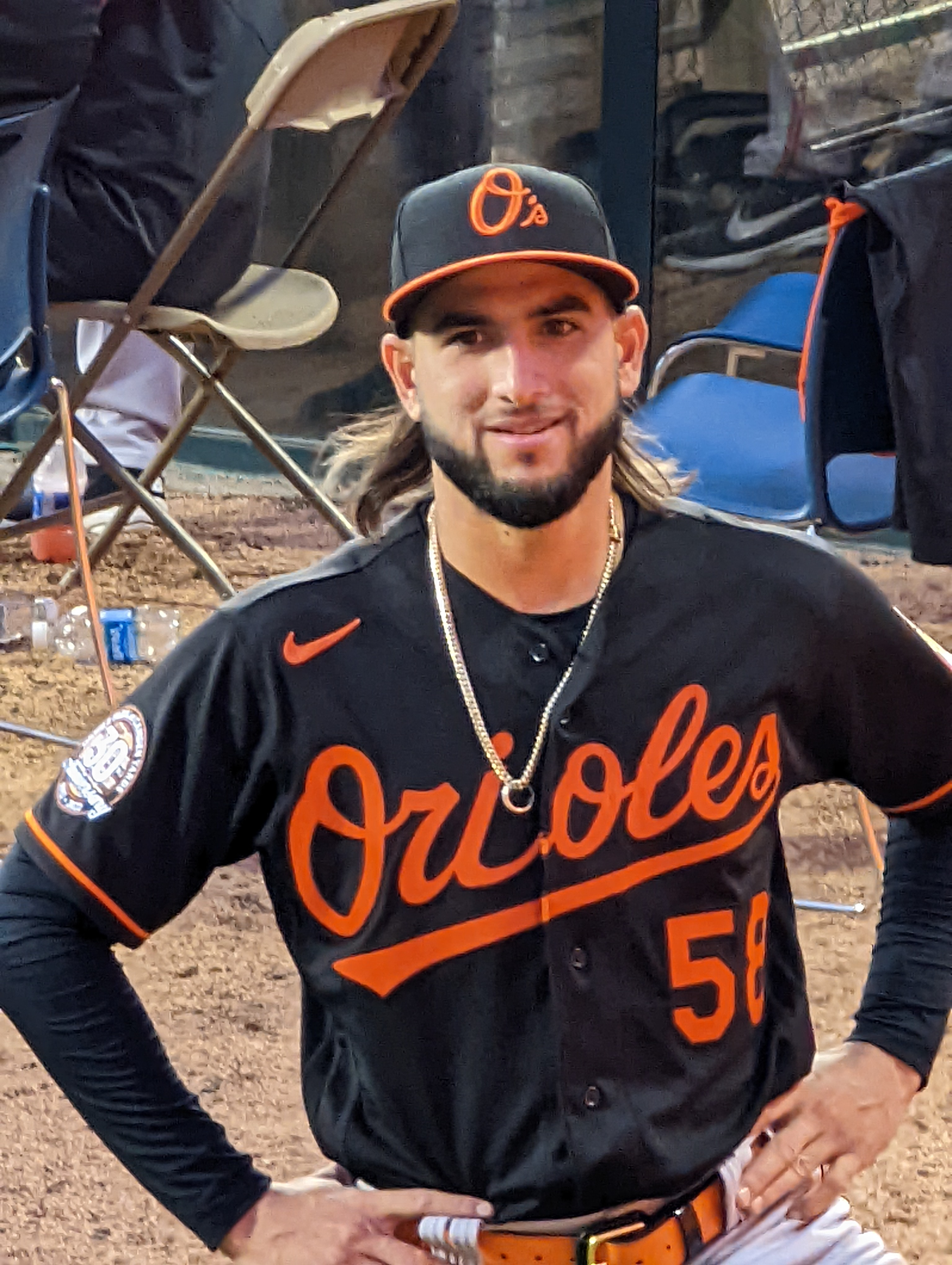
- Pérez with the Baltimore Orioles in 2022

New York Mets – No. 52
- Pitcher
- Born: April 21, 1996 (age 30); Havana, Cuba
- Bats: Right Throws: Left

MLB debut
- July 11, 2018, for the Houston Astros

MLB statistics (through 2026 season)
- Win–loss record: 19–9
- Earned run average: 4.30
- Strikeouts: 262
- Stats at Baseball Reference

Teams
- Houston Astros (2018–2020); Cincinnati Reds (2021); Baltimore Orioles (2022–2025); Washington Nationals (2026); New York Mets (2026–present)

Cionel Félix Pérez Viera (born April 21, 1996) is a Cuban professional baseball pitcher for the New York Mets of Major League Baseball (MLB). He has previously played in MLB for the Houston Astros, Cincinnati Reds, Baltimore Orioles, and Washington Nationals. He signed with the Astros as an international free agent in 2016, and made his MLB debut with them in 2018.

== Career ==
=== Houston Astros ===
Pérez played two seasons for Matanzas of the Cuban National Series. In September 2016, he signed a $5.15 million contract with the Houston Astros as an international free agent. The contract was voided in October due an issue in his physical. On December 9, Pérez agreed to a new deal with the Astros worth $2 million.

Pérez made his professional debut with the Single-A Quad Cities River Bandits in 2017. He was promoted later that season to the High-A Buies Creek Astros and Double-A Corpus Christi Hooks. In 21 total games (16 starts) between the three clubs, he posted a 6–4 record and 4.13 ERA with a 1.29 WHIP. The Astros added Pérez to their 40-man roster after the season, in order to protect him from the Rule 5 draft. Pérez made his major league debut on July 11, 2018. In 2019, he played for the rookie-level Gulf Coast League Astros, High-A Fayetteville Woodpeckers, and Triple-A Round Rock Express, going 3–1 with a 4.94 ERA and 58 strikeouts over 54 2/3 innings. Pérez appeared in 5 games for the Astros in 2019, going 1–1 with a 10.00 ERA and 7 strikeouts over 9 innings. In 2020 for Houston, Pérez made 7 appearances, registering a 2.84 ERA with 8 strikeouts in 6 1/3 innings of work.

=== Cincinnati Reds ===
On January 23, 2021, the Astros traded Pérez to the Cincinnati Reds in exchange for Luke Berryhill. Pérez made 25 appearances for Cincinnati in 2021, compiling a 1–2 record and 6.38 ERA with 25 strikeouts across 24 innings pitched.

=== Baltimore Orioles ===
On November 24, 2021, Pérez was claimed off waivers by the Baltimore Orioles. On June 12, 2022, Pérez recorded his first career save in a 10–7 win over the Kansas City Royals. Pérez made 66 appearances for Baltimore in 2022, pitching to a stellar 7–1 record and 1.40 ERA with 55 strikeouts in 57 2/3 innings pitched.

Perez appeared in 65 contests for the Orioles during the 2023 campaign, compiling a 4–2 record and 3.54 ERA with 44 strikeouts and 3 saves across 53 1/3 innings of work. He took a step back in 2024, working to a 4.53 ERA with 46 strikeouts and 2 saves across 62 relief appearances.

Pérez made 19 appearances for Baltimore in 2025, but struggled to an 8.31 ERA with 21 strikeouts across 21 2/3 innings pitched. Pérez was designated for assignment by the Orioles following the promotion of Yaramil Hiraldo on May 24. He cleared waivers and was sent outright to the Triple-A Norfolk Tides on May 31. In 21 appearances for Norfolk, he struggled to a 1–2 record and 6.85 ERA with 23 strikeouts across 22 1/3 innings pitched. Pérez elected free agency on September 29.

=== Washington Nationals ===
On February 14, 2026, Pérez signed a minor league contract with the Washington Nationals. On March 23, the Nationals selected Pérez's contract after he made the team's Opening Day roster. He made 16 appearances for Washington, compiling a 2–3 record and 6.19 ERA with nine strikeouts over 16 innings of work. On May 2, Pérez was removed from the 40-man roster and sent outright to the Triple-A Rochester Red Wings. However, he rejected the assignment and elected free agency two days later.

=== New York Mets ===
On May 6, 2026, Pérez signed a minor league contract with the New York Mets. He made six appearances for the Triple-A Syracuse Mets, recording a 2.57 ERA with 10 strikeouts over seven innings of work. On May 30, the Mets selected Pérez's contract, adding him to their active roster.

== Personal life ==
Perez is married and has two children.
