= Stoner–Keller House and Mill =

Historic house in Virginia, United States

- U.S. National Register of Historic Places
- Virginia Landmarks Register
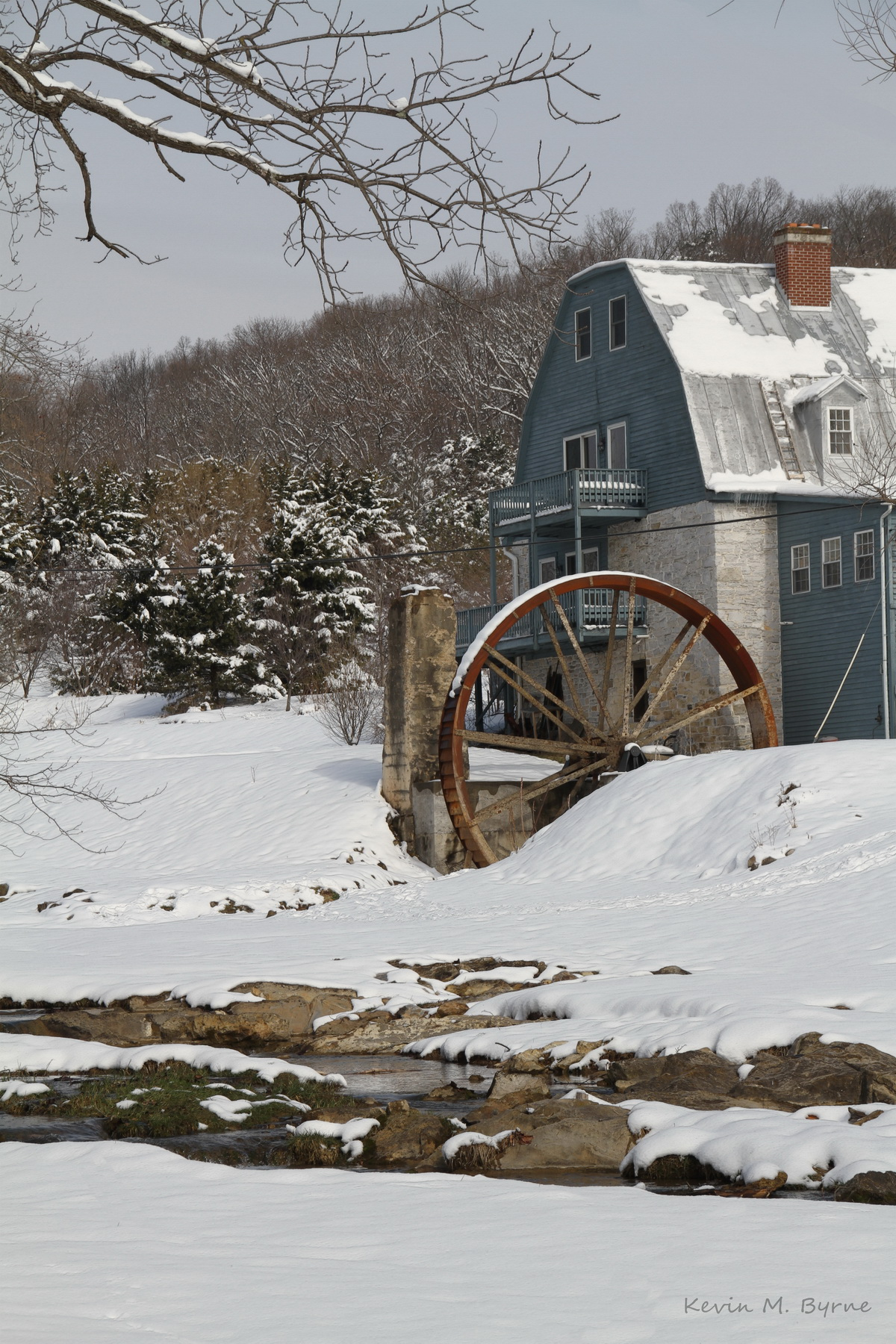

- Location within Virginia Location within the United States
- Location: 2900 Battlefield Rd., near Strasburg, Virginia
- Coordinates: 38°59′06″N 78°23′57″W
- Area: 2.5 acres (1.0 ha)
- Built: c. 1772, 1844
- Built by: Stoner, Abraham
- Architectural style: Greek Revival, Victorian
- NRHP reference No.: 12001269
- VLR No.: 085-0084

Significant dates
- Added to NRHP: February 5, 2013
- Designated VLR: December 13, 2012

The Stoner–Keller House and Mill, also known as the Abraham Stoner House, John H. Keller House, and Stoner Mill, is a historic home and grist mill located near Strasburg, Shenandoah County, Virginia. The main house was built in 1844, and is a two-story, five-bay, gable-roofed, L-shaped, vernacular Greek Revival style brick "I-house." It has a frame, one-story, three-bay, hip-roofed front porch with late-Victorian scroll-sawn wood decoration. The Stoner–Keller Mill was built about 1772 and enlarged about 1855. It is a gambrel-roofed, four-story, limestone building with a Fitz steel wheel added about 1895. Also on the property are the contributing tailrace trace (1772), frame tenant house and bank barn (c. 1880), and a dam ruin (c. 1920).

It was listed on the National Register of Historic Places in 2013.
