= Strasburg Stone and Earthenware Manufacturing Company =

Historic building in Virginia, United States

- U.S. National Register of Historic Places
- Virginia Landmarks Register
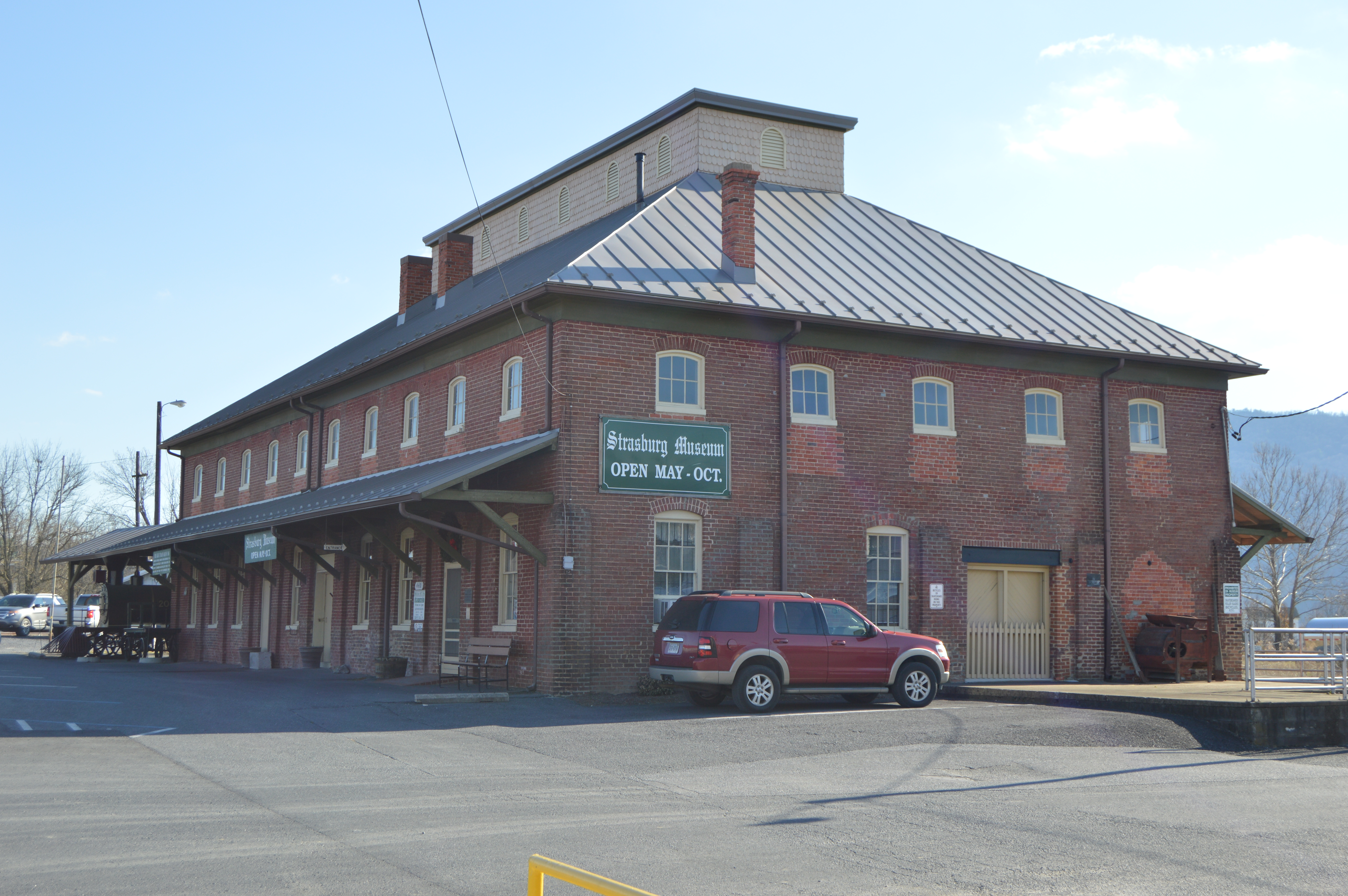
- Front and western side

- Location within Virginia Location within the United States
- Location: E. King St., Strasburg, Virginia
- Coordinates: 38°59′14″N 78°21′23″W
- Area: 1.9 acres (0.77 ha)
- Built: 1891
- NRHP reference No.: 79003086
- VLR No.: 306-0009

Significant dates
- Added to NRHP: June 19, 1979
- Designated VLR: April 17, 1979

Strasburg Stone and Earthenware Manufacturing Company, also known as the Strasburg Museum, Steam Pottery, and Southern Railroad Station, is a historic factory building located at Strasburg, Shenandoah County, Virginia. It was built in 1891, and is a two-story, 10-bay brick building originally constructed for the Strasburg Stone and Earthenware Manufacturing Company to make earthenware. It was converted to railroad use in 1913, at which time a one-story pent roof was added. The building is covered with a slate-clad hipped roof surmounted by a hipped monitor. The building served as a station and depot for the Southern Railroad.

The Strasburg Museum opened in the building in 1970. Displays include railroad artifacts and a model railroad, Strasburg pottery, Native American artifacts, period rooms, and items from the American Civil War.

It was listed on the National Register of Historic Places in 1979.

== See also ==
- National Register of Historic Places in Shenandoah County, Virginia
