= Mike Lowell =

Puerto Rican baseball player (born 1974)

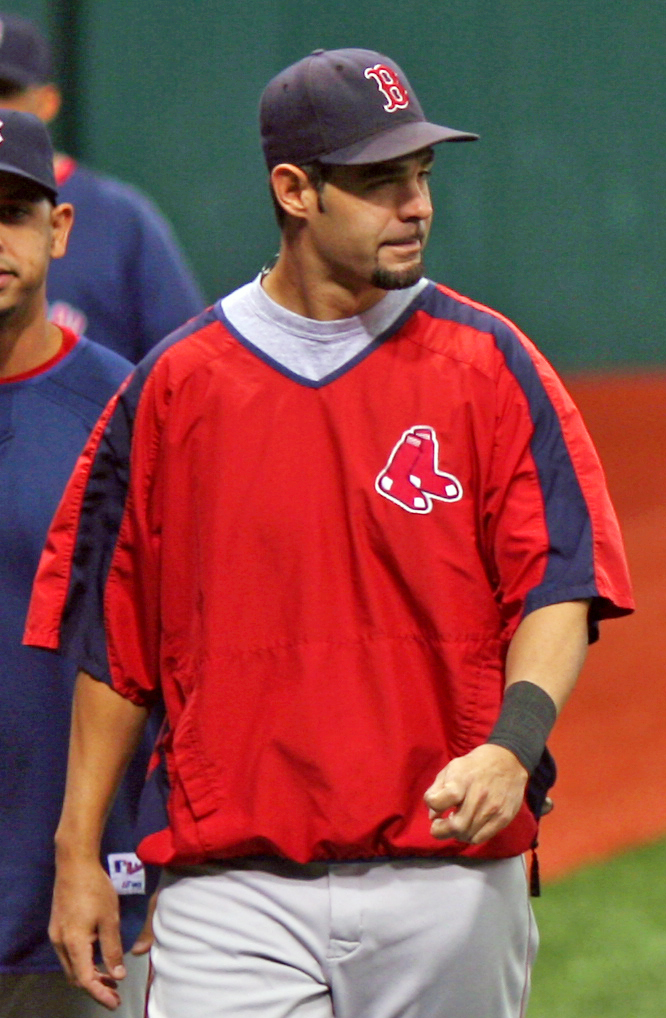
- Lowell with the Boston Red Sox in 2007
- Third baseman
- Born: February 24, 1974 (age 52); San Juan, Puerto Rico
- Batted: Right Threw: Right

MLB debut
- September 13, 1998, for the New York Yankees

Last MLB appearance
- October 2, 2010, for the Boston Red Sox

MLB statistics
- Batting average: .279
- Home runs: 223
- Runs batted in: 952
- Stats at Baseball Reference

Teams
- New York Yankees (1998); Florida Marlins (1999–2005); Boston Red Sox (2006–2010)

Career highlights and awards
- 4× All-Star (2002–2004, 2007); 2× World Series champion (2003, 2007); World Series MVP (2007); Gold Glove Award (2005); Silver Slugger Award (2003); Boston Red Sox Hall of Fame

Michael Averett Lowell (born February 24, 1974) is a Puerto Rican former professional baseball third baseman. During a 13-year Major League Baseball (MLB) career, Lowell played for the New York Yankees (1998), Florida Marlins (1999–2005), and the Boston Red Sox (2006–2010). With the Red Sox, he was named MVP of the 2007 World Series. He also starred on the Marlins team that won the 2003 World Series, was a four-time MLB All-Star and won a Silver Slugger Award in 2003 and Gold Glove Award in 2005.

== Early life and amateur career ==
Lowell was born in Puerto Rico on February 24, 1974. His parents were born in Cuba, and are of Irish and Spanish ancestry. His family relocated to Miami, Florida, when Lowell was four years old. He has always identified himself as both Cuban and Puerto Rican. He attended elementary school at Epiphany Catholic School in South Miami, Florida. As a high school sophomore at Christopher Columbus High School, he was selected to the varsity baseball team but did not get playing time, so he transferred to Coral Gables Senior High School for his junior year.

In 1992, Lowell graduated from Coral Gables Senior High School in Coral Gables, Florida, where he had a 4.0 GPA and was a star player on the baseball team. There, he met future wife, a member of the school's nationally recognized Gablettes dance team, of which she became coach years later.

=== Florida International University ===
Lowell received an athletic scholarship to attend Florida International University (FIU) to play college baseball for the FIU Panthers. In 1993, he played in the Valley Baseball League, a collegiate summer baseball league in the Shenandoah Valley region of Virginia for the Waynesboro Generals. In the summer of 1994, he played for the Chatham A's in the Cape Cod Baseball League (CCBL). Lowell was a league all-star for Chatham and was inducted into the CCBL Hall of Fame in 2011. Lowell graduated from FIU in 1997 with a bachelor's degree in finance.

A three-time All-Conference player with the Panthers, his uniform number 15 was retired. Lowell was drafted by the New York Yankees in the 1995 Major League Baseball draft and eventually made his MLB debut with the New York Yankees during the 1998 season. He was also converted to play as a third baseman, having been at shortstop and second base in college.

== Professional career ==
=== New York Yankees ===
Lowell was drafted by the New York Yankees in the 20th round of the 1995 Major League Baseball draft. He made his major league debut as a September call-up for the Yankees in 1998, singling in his first at-bat and playing eight games in the season.

Although Lowell debuted late in the season and did not play in the 1998 postseason, he still received his first career World Series ring as the Yankees won the World Series against the San Diego Padres.

=== Florida Marlins ===
Lowell was traded to the Florida Marlins on February 1, 1999, for Mark Johnson and Ed Yarnall. While waiting for spring training, Lowell discovered that he had testicular cancer and underwent surgery on February 21, returning to the lineup on May 29. He finished his season with a .253 batting average, 12 home runs, and 47 RBI.

Lowell had successful years in Florida and established himself as one of the elite third baseman in the league. In 2001, he finished with 18 home runs and 100 RBI.

Lowell was having an excellent season in 2003, but in late August he suffered a broken hand when he was hit by a pitch by the Montreal Expos' Héctor Almonte, forcing him to miss 32 games. He finished the season with 32 home runs and 105 RBI. Rookie Miguel Cabrera moved from left field to third base after Lowell's injury. Lowell returned for the postseason and had five hits in the Marlins' World Series win over the Yankees.

In 2004, he hit a career-high (at the time) .293 with 27 home runs and 85 RBI. Despite a disappointing 2005 season in which he hit .236 with only eight home runs and a .298 on-base percentage, Lowell earned his only Gold Glove Award. He also finished third in doubles in the league, totaling 47 doubles.

The Marlins traded him to Boston in a deal that was officially completed on November 21, 2005, in which the Red Sox received Lowell, Josh Beckett and Guillermo Mota in exchange for Hanley Ramírez, Aníbal Sánchez, Jesús Delgado and Harvey García.

=== Boston Red Sox ===
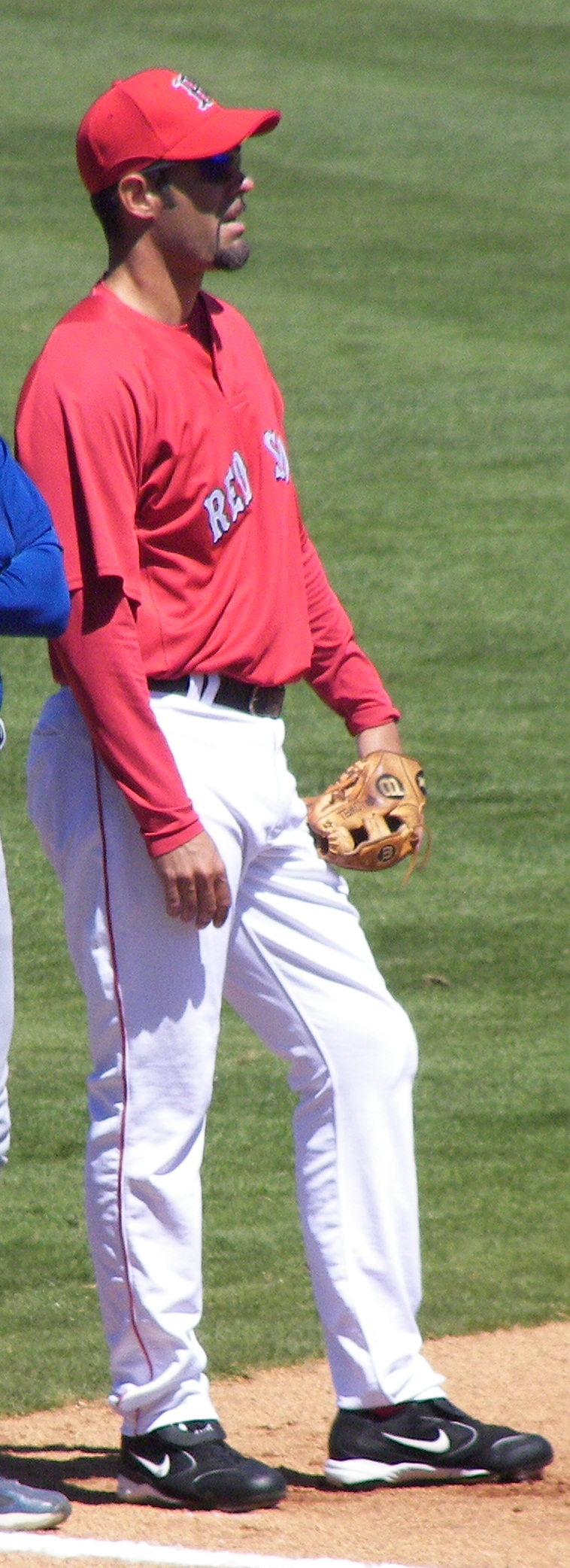
Lowell with the Boston Red Sox in spring 2007

Even though the Boston Red Sox took on Lowell and his contract largely because the Marlins would not trade pitcher Josh Beckett without relieving themselves of Lowell's salary, Lowell fared better than expected as a member of the 2006 Red Sox, for a time leading the American League (AL) in doubles and providing solid defense at third base. Lowell finished with 20 home runs and 80 RBI, and he was tied with Eric Chavez for the best fielding percentage at his position.

The 2007 season turned out to be one of Lowell's best: he set career bests in hits, RBI, batting average, OPS, and played a key role in helping the Red Sox win their second World Series in four years. One of the early highlights of the season came on April 22, when Lowell was one of the four Red Sox players to hit consecutive home runs against the Yankees. During the first half, Lowell hit .300 and led the team with 14 home runs (tied with David Ortiz) and 63 RBI. This performance helped earn him a spot on the AL All-Star Team as a reserve player voted in on the player's ballot.

As the Red Sox held onto its lead in the AL East division, Lowell continued to carry the team by hitting .350 during the second half. His season total of 120 RBI was not only a personal best but a franchise record for a Red Sox third baseman, beating Butch Hobson's total of 112 in 1977. Lowell also finished with a .324 batting average, 21 home runs and 191 hits, another career high.

During the 2007 World Series, Lowell hit .400 with one home run, 4 RBI, six runs scored and a stolen base in the four-game sweep against the Colorado Rockies. Lowell got his second World Series ring and was named the World Series MVP. He also became the second Puerto Rican player to be named the MVP of a World Series, following Roberto Clemente. Lowell and fellow ex-Marlin Beckett became the first duo to each get a World Series MVP by winning a World Series with one team in the AL and the other in the National League.

Following the season, Lowell placed fifth in the AL Most Valuable Player voting. Although he filed for free agency, Lowell returned to the Red Sox after signing a three-year contract worth $37.5 million.

Lowell had trouble with a torn hip labrum that required surgery between the 2008 and 2009 seasons. As a result, he spent several stints on the disabled list. The injury caused him to miss most of the 2008 playoffs, including the AL Championship Series, when the Red Sox lost to the Tampa Bay Rays. It also kept him from representing Puerto Rico in the 2009 World Baseball Classic. He did return to the Red Sox in 2009, though he saw reduced playing time at third base in order to keep him healthy. After the Red Sox acquired Victor Martinez in a midseason trade with the Cleveland Indians, Lowell's playing time was reduced, casting his future with the team into doubt. After the season, it was speculated that the Red Sox would attempt to trade Lowell.

Following the 2009 season, the Red Sox and Texas Rangers agreed to a deal that would send Lowell to Texas for catcher Max Ramírez. However, the deal was called off by the Rangers when they discovered that Lowell required surgery on his right thumb. Lowell underwent a successful surgery on December 30. He remained with the Red Sox and joined the team for spring training following rehabilitation on his surgically repaired thumb. On April 10, 2010, Lowell announced that he would most likely retire after the 2010 season. In the 2010 season, he played as a backup infielder at first and third base and as a pinch hitter. On May 3, Lowell had his eighth career three-double game, setting an all-time record for the most by a player in a career. On August 3, after coming back from nearly two months on the disabled list, Lowell stepped into the batter's box to a standing ovation at Fenway Park and hit a two-run home run on the first pitch.

On October 2, the Red Sox honored Lowell with an on-field ceremony as he would go on to retire after the season.

== Post-playing career ==
Lowell works as an analyst on the MLB Network, appearing on MLB Tonight.

Lowell appeared on the ballot for the Baseball Hall of Fame 2016 election and received no votes.

== Accolades ==
- 2× World Series champion (2003, 2007)
- 2007 World Series MVP
- 4× All-Star (2002–2004, 2007)
- Tony Conigliaro Award winner (1999)
- NL Gold Glove Third Baseman (2005)
- TYIB Defensive Player of the Year (2006)
- Jackie Jensen Award (2006)
- Holds the Red Sox franchise single-season record for most RBIs by a third baseman (2007)

== Personal life ==
Lowell and his wife have two children. In 2006, Lowell's sister married Carlos Curbelo, a United States Congressman from 2015 to 2019. Lowell's father pitched for the Puerto Rico national team, winning against Cuba in 1972. The Lowell family currently resides in Pinecrest, Florida.

Lowell's autobiography, Deep Drive: A Long Journey to Finding the Champion Within, was published on May 6, 2008. On February 19, 1999, Lowell was diagnosed with testicular cancer, causing him to miss nearly two months of the 1999 season while he underwent treatment for the disease. He later recovered.

== See also ==
- List of Puerto Ricans
- Irish immigration to Puerto Rico
- List of Major League Baseball career home run leaders

Awards
Preceded by Ian Kinsler; Zack Greinke	AL Player of the Week; April 20–26, 2009	Succeeded by Evan Longoria
