= Front Royal Cardinals =

Collegiate summer baseball team in Front Royal, Virginia, U.S.

Front Royal Cardinals
Founded	1984
Field	Bing Crosby Stadium
Team History	Front Royal Cardinals (1984–present)
Colors	Red, White, and Gray
Team Mascot	Wildcard
Division	Northern
Championships	(1986)
Runner-Up	(1997, 2010)
Head coach	Brian Wirth

The Front Royal Cardinals are a collegiate summer baseball team in Front Royal, Virginia, USA, playing in the northern division of the Valley Baseball League. They play their home games at Bing Crosby Stadium, which is located within the Warren County-run Gertrude E. Miller Recreational Park.
