= Waynesboro Generals =

Information
- League: Valley Baseball League (Southern Division)
- Location: Waynesboro, Virginia
- Ballpark: Affordable Home Mortgage Park at Kate Collins Field
- Founded: 1950
- League championships: 6: (1984) (1988) (1998) (2007) (2013) (2014)
- Colors: Red and Blue
- Mascot: General
- Ownership: Waynesboro Amateur Athletics (a 501(c)3 non-profit)
- Management: Tyler Hoffman(General Manager)
- Coach: Zach Cole
- Website: www.waynesborogenerals.net

The Waynesboro Generals are a collegiate summer baseball team in Waynesboro, Virginia. They play in the southern division of the Valley Baseball League. The Generals have won six Valley League playoff championships: in 1984, 1988, 1998, 2007, 2013, and 2014, making them one of the most winning organizations of the league during that time. The Generals were founded in 1923 and have been playing continuously since then with the exception of a ten-year period between 1955 and 1964.

In 2007, the Generals' victory came two games to zero over the Luray Wranglers. In 2013, the Generals won the South Division and then prevailed in the final series two games to one over the Strasburg Express. In 2014, the Generals again won the South and came back from a 6-0 deficit to defeat the Charles Town Cannons of the North Division, 7-6, with a walkoff single in the bottom of the ninth inning of the championship game.

== Notable players ==
- Mike Lowell (1993)
- Brandon Inge (1996)
- Erik Kratz (2000)
