= Wyatt Langford =

American baseball player (born 2001)

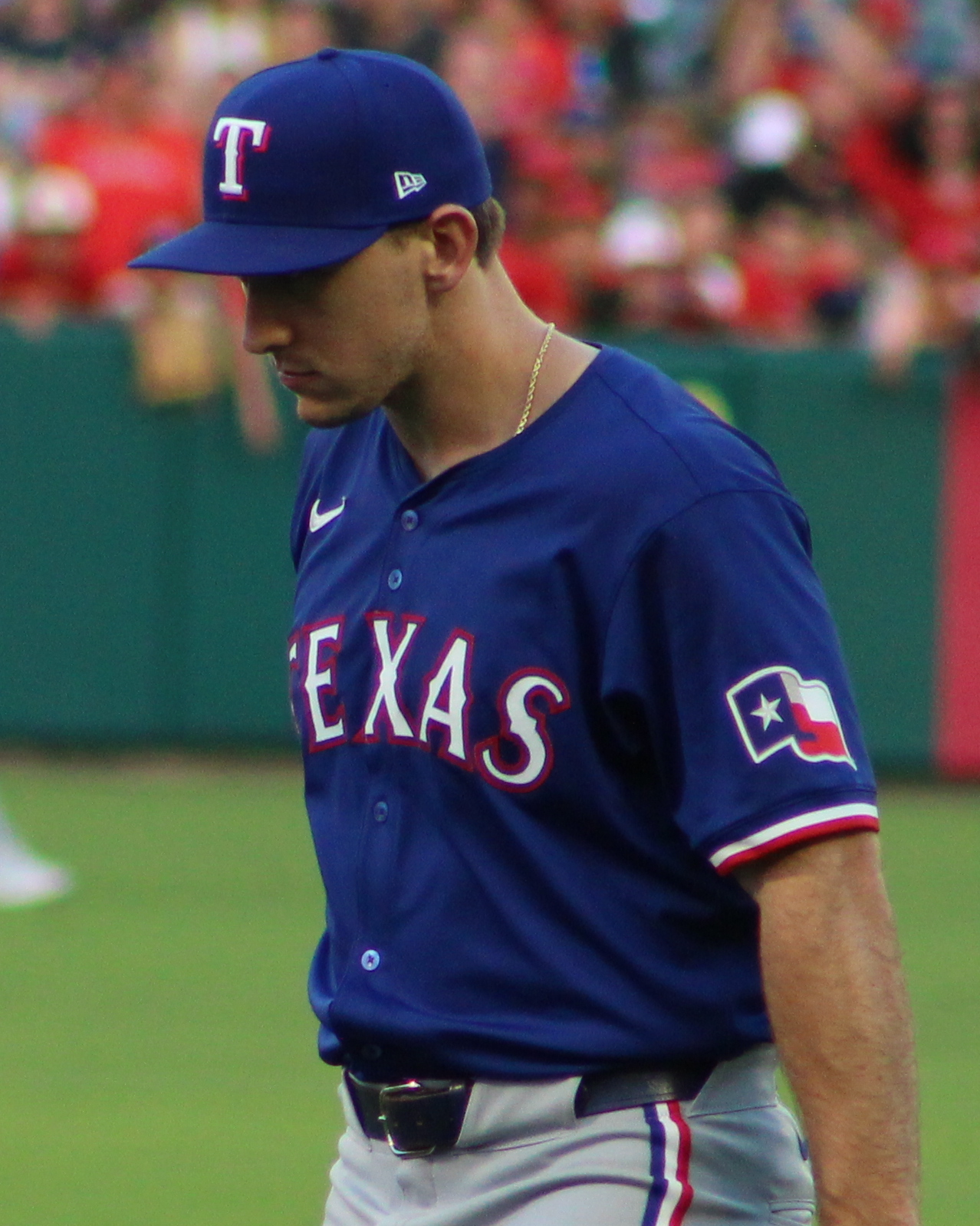
- Langford with the Texas Rangers in 2024

Texas Rangers – No. 36
- Outfielder
- Born: November 15, 2001 (age 24); Gainesville, Florida, U.S.
- Bats: Right Throws: Right

MLB debut
- March 28, 2024, for the Texas Rangers

MLB statistics (through 2026 season)
- Batting average: .244
- Home runs: 55
- Runs batted in: 180
- Stats at Baseball Reference

Teams
- Texas Rangers (2024–present)
Medals
Men's baseball
Representing the United States
Haarlem Baseball Week
Bronze medal – third place	2022	Team

Wyatt Michael Langford (born November 15, 2001) is an American professional baseball outfielder for the Texas Rangers of Major League Baseball (MLB). Langford played college baseball for the Florida Gators. He was selected fourth overall by the Rangers in the 2023 MLB draft, and made his MLB debut in 2024.

== Amateur career ==
Langford attended Trenton High School in Trenton, Florida. He played baseball and football at Trenton. In 2019, he won the 2019 Perfect Game National Home Run Derby. Langford committed to the University of Florida to play college baseball.

As a freshman at Florida in 2021, Langford played in four games and had one hit over four at-bats. That summer he played for the Charlottesville Tom Sox in the Valley Baseball League, posting a .346/.459/.527/.987 slash line with three home runs and 20 runs batted in (RBI). In 2022, he started all 66 games and hit 26 home runs, which tied Matt LaPorta for most home runs in a season by a Gators player. He finished the season, slashing .356/.447/.719 with 63 RBI. After the season, he played for the United States collegiate national team during the summer. He also played in nine games for the Peninsula Pilots of the Coastal Plain League.

Langford entered the 2023 season as one of the top prospects for the 2023 Major League Baseball draft and the potential first overall pick. Langford slashed .373/.498/.784/1.282 with 21 home runs, 57 RBI, and 9 stolen bases for the Gators in 2023. Langford was a 2023 Golden Spikes Award Semifinalist. He was a 2023 unanimous First Team All-American. Langford helped lead Florida to the 2023 Men's College World Series finals and was named to the 2023 College World Series All-Tournament Team.

== Professional career ==
=== Draft and minor leagues (2023) ===
The Texas Rangers chose Langford in the first round, with the fourth overall selection, in the 2023 MLB draft. On July 18, Langford signed with Texas for a $8 million signing bonus. Langford made his professional debut with the ACL Rangers of the Rookie-level Arizona Complex League, hitting .385 with one home run and four RBI over three games. He was promoted to the Hickory Crawdads of the High-A South Atlantic League on August 2. Over 24 games for Hickory, he hit .333/.453/.644/1.097 with five home runs, 15 RBI, and seven stolen bases. Langford was then promoted to the Frisco RoughRiders of the Double-A Texas League for the final 12 games of their season, hitting .405/.519/.762/1.280 with four home runs, 10 RBI, and one stolen base. Langford's rapid ascent through the minor leagues contained one final stop in 2023, with a promotion on September 19 to the Round Rock Express of the Triple-A Pacific Coast League for the final six games of their season.

=== Texas Rangers (2024–present) ===
Langford made the Rangers Opening Day roster in 2024. On April 28, he hit his first home run, an inside-the-park home run off Andrew Abbott of the Cincinnati Reds. Playing three games at Round Rock in May, he batted .200/.273/.200. On June 22, against the Kansas City Royals, Langford hit his first career grand slam off reliever Ángel Zerpa in the eighth inning. On June 30, he hit for the cycle against the Baltimore Orioles, the 11th player to accomplish the feat in franchise history. (Note: Two cycles were hit by the same Ranger, Adrian Beltre, and one cycle was hit by Jim King in 1964, when the franchise played as the Washington Senators.) On September 3, Langford hit a walk-off grand slam against the New York Yankees, the eighth in Rangers history. Additionally, he became the first player since Jackie Robinson, and the first rookie ever, to hit an inside-the-park home run, a walk-off grand slam, and hit for the cycle in the same season. Langford finished the 2024 season batting .253/.325/.415 with 16 home runs, 74 RBIs, and 19 stolen bases while finishing seventh in American League Rookie of the Year voting.

In 2025, Langford batted .241/.344/.431 with 22 home runs, 62 RBIs, and 22 stolen bases. He was named a finalist for the American League Gold Glove Award for left fielders, but lost to Steven Kwan of the Cleveland Guardians.

In 2026, Langford batted .238/.333/.421 with 17 home runs, 44 RBIs, and 15 stolen bases. He led all full-time left fielders with a 2.12 range factor.

== Awards ==
In July 2024, he was named American League Rookie of the Month for June 2024.

In October 2024, he was named American League Player of the Month and Rookie of the Month for September 2024.

== Personal life ==
On December 16, 2023, Langford married Hallie Bryant, who plays softball at the University of North Florida.

== Notes ==
Achievements
Preceded by Jose Altuve	Hitting for the cycle June 30, 2024	Succeeded by Yordan Alvarez
Awards
Preceded by Aaron Judge	American League Player of the Month; September 2024	Succeeded by Aaron Judge
Preceded by Luis Gil	American League Rookie of the Month; June 2024	Succeeded by Colt Keith
Preceded by Spencer Arrighetti	American League Rookie of the Month; September 2024	Succeeded by Kristian Campbell
