= Aldie Senators =

Haymarket Senators
Founded
December 2005
Field
Battlefield High School
Team History
Haymarket Senators
(2006-2012)
(moved) Aldie Senators
(2013–2015)
Division
Northern
Championships
1 (2009)
Owner
2005 - 2007: Mark Keagle

2007 - 2012: Bernie Schaffler, Scott Newell, Robin Schaffler, Jayme Newell

The Haymarket Senators were a collegiate summer baseball team based out of Haymarket, Virginia.They competed in the Northern Division of the Valley Baseball League and played their home games at Battlefield High School. The team dropped out of the league after the 2015 season.

The team's uniform colors are navy blue and red. The Haymarket Senators originally joined the Valley Baseball League in the winter of 2005 when Mark Keagle purchased the Haymarket Battlecats and promptly renamed the team. Due to a lack of support by the local community the Senators were sold at the conclusion of 2007 season. The Haymarket Senators moved to the neighboring community of Aldie after the completion of the 2012 season.

On August 12, 2009, the Senators won their first Valley League Baseball Championship, beating the Covington Lumberjacks 6-1.

On July 7, 2009, Scott Krieger, a player from George Mason University who played for the Senators in 2008, was selected by the Milwaukee Brewers in the 19th round of the MLB draft.
