= Strasburg, Virginia =

- Town
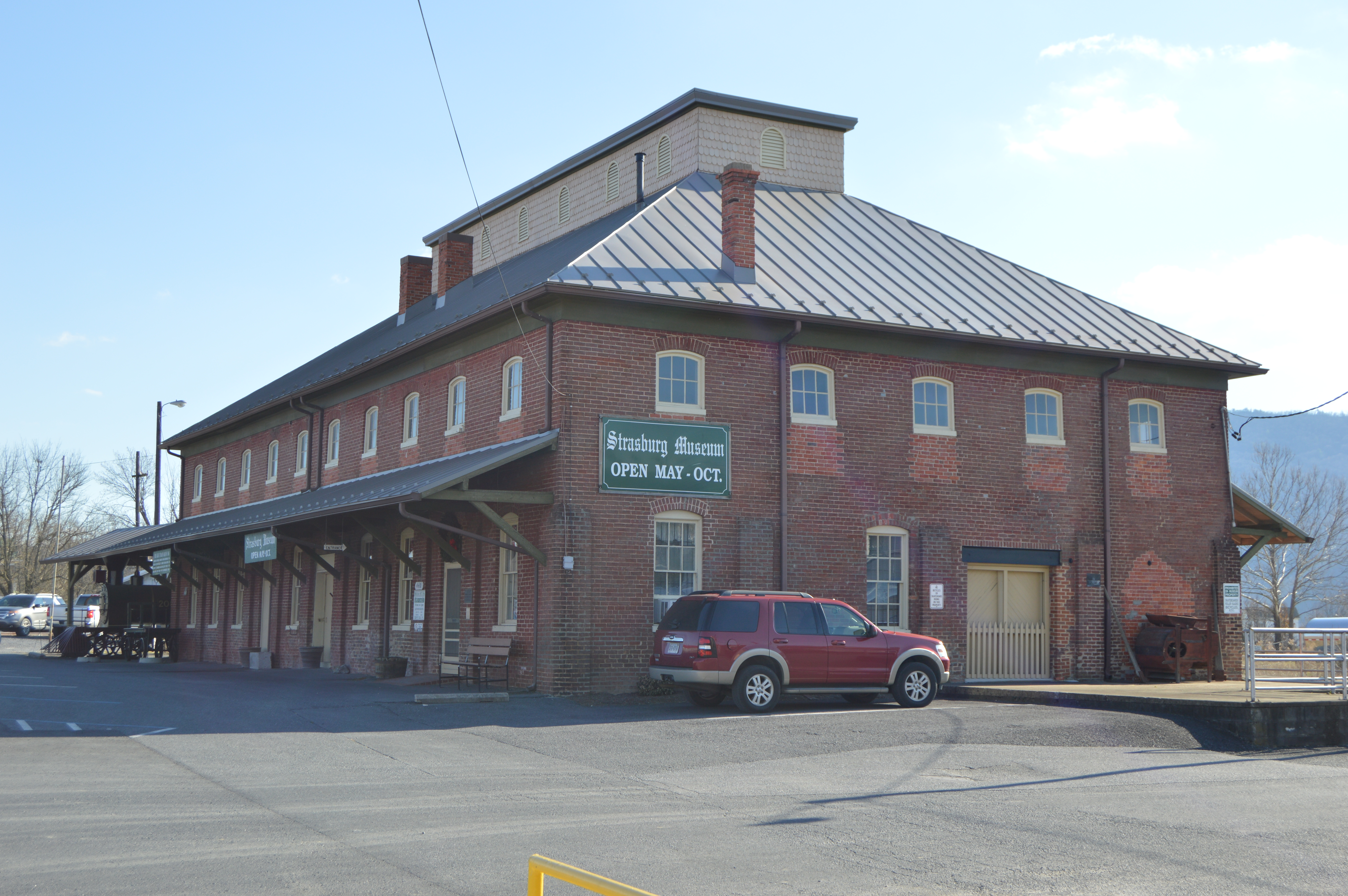
- Front and western side of the former Strasburg Stone and Earthenware Manufacturing Company (now Strasburg Museum)

- Flag Seal
- Nickname: Pot Town
- Location within Virginia
- Coordinates: 38°59′26″N 78°21′31″W
- Country: United States
- State: Virginia
- County: Shenandoah
- Founded: 1761
- Incorporated: 1871
- Founder: Peter Stover

Government
  - Type: Mayor-Council
  - Mayor: Brandy Hawkins Boies
  - Town Manager: Mellanie Shipe
  - Council: Members' List: • AD Carter IV; • Ashleigh Kimmons (Vice Mayor); • Andrew Lowder; • Emily McCoryn; • Christie Monahan; • Jonathan Price; • Brad Stover; • David Woodson

Area
  - Total: 4.11 sq mi (10.65 km^{2})
  - Land: 4.07 sq mi (10.54 km^{2})
  - Water: 0.039 sq mi (0.10 km^{2})
- Elevation: 578 ft (176 m)

Population (2020)
  - Total: 7,083
  - Density: 1,740/sq mi (671.8/km^{2})
- Time zone: UTC−05:00
  - Summer (DST): UTC−04:00
- ZIP Code: 22657
- Area code: 540
- FIPS code: 51-76000
- GNIS feature ID: 1487663
- Website: www.strasburgva.com

Strasburg /ˈstrɑːzbɜːrɡ/ is a town in Shenandoah County, Virginia, United States, which was founded in 1761 by Peter Stover. It is the largest town by population in the county and is known for its grassroots art culture, pottery, antiques, and American Civil War history. The population was 7,083 at the 2020 census.

== History ==
=== Early settlers ===
German-speaking Pennsylvanians were among the first non-native settlers to arrive in the northern Shenandoah Valley and Strasburg area. The luscious greenery and fertile land were prime targets for immigrant farmers. On August 21, 1734, speculator Henry Willis was granted 2,030 acres (8.2 km^{2}) total of this land by William Gooch, Virginia's Lieutenant Governor and Commander in Chief. Gooch wished to settle the Valley to create a buffer between Native American tribes and the rest of the Virginia colony. During the summer of 1735, Willis sold his entire property to Jacob Funk. Jacob, in return, partitioned his new purchase, reselling a part of it to his brother John.

In contrast to the English culture found east of the Blue Ridge Mountains, Strasburg was settled with family farms and towns rather than plantations (and slaves). Instead, the German language and Germanic architecture were more common than in areas east of the Blue Ridge. The thriving agricultural community that developed in the fertile bottomland along the banks of the Shenandoah River boasted scenic views of Massanutten Mountain (to the east) and the Allegheny Mountains (to the west). Later nicknamed “Pot Town,” Strasburg also became a center for the production of both utilitarian and fancy earthenware and stoneware pottery. During the 19th and 20th centuries, many residents worked for the railroad industry and at limestone quarries; after WWII, other industries came to Strasburg, including paper and automotive parts manufacturing. Today, Strasburg boasts a growing service economy, museums, eateries, numerous antique stores, and other shops.

=== Founder ===
Peter Stover (Petrus Stauffer) is considered the founder of the Town of Strasburg. Stover was born in 1715 to a German-Swiss father, Christian Stauffer I., in Mannheim, Baden-Württemberg, Germany. Stauffer took his family to America in 1718 to gain religious freedom and settled in Montgomery County, Pennsylvania, where he would live out his entire life.

His son Peter migrated south to Virginia by 1730 and to the Shenandoah Valley as early as 1739. On May 2, 1749, Stover purchased 483 acres (1.95 km^{2}) of land from Jacob Funk, his future father-in-law. The purchase was divided into smaller plots for sale to other settlers and a village was informally established.

Stover applied for a town charter in November 1761, giving the town the official name of Strasburg. The name was taken from Strasbourg, the capital of Alsace, France. Some called the area Staufferstadt, the German name for Stoverstown. Ten trustees were named; William Miller, Matthew Harrison, Jacob Bowman, Valentine Smith, Charles Buck, Peter Stover, Isaac Hite, Leonard Baltice, John Funk, and Philip Huffman (Hoffman).

Peter eventually married Frainey Funk before he died on August 13, 1799 at the age of 84. He was survived by eight children. Being a philanthropist for most of his life, Stover's will left land and $10,000 to the community to establish schools. A monument resides in Strasburg's Riverview Cemetery honoring Peter Stover, but the whereabouts of his grave is unknown.

=== Recent growth ===
Strasburg has experienced significant (but sustainable) growth in recent years, mainly along its northern corridor, due to Washington, D.C. being located approximately 80 miles away.

== Geography ==
Strasburg is located at 38°59′26″N 78°21′31″W (38.990550, −78.358615) in the northern end of the Shenandoah Valley. The area is surrounded by the natural boundaries of Massanutten and the Allegheny Mountains as well as the Shenandoah River. Cedar Creek and Belle Grove National Historical Park is located in and around Strasburg.

According to the United States Census Bureau, the town has a total area of 4.1 square miles (10.6 km^{2}), of which 4.1 square miles (10.5 km^{2}) is land and 0.04 square mile (0.1 km^{2}) (0.97%) is water. The elevation of the area is 578 ft (176 m).

=== Climate ===
Strasburg has a humid subtropical climate(Cfa), with cool winters and hot, humid summers. The average low in January, the coldest month, is 20F. The average high in July, the hottest month, is 85F. Average annual snowfall is 26 inches, while average annual precipitation totals 39.6 inches.

== Culture ==
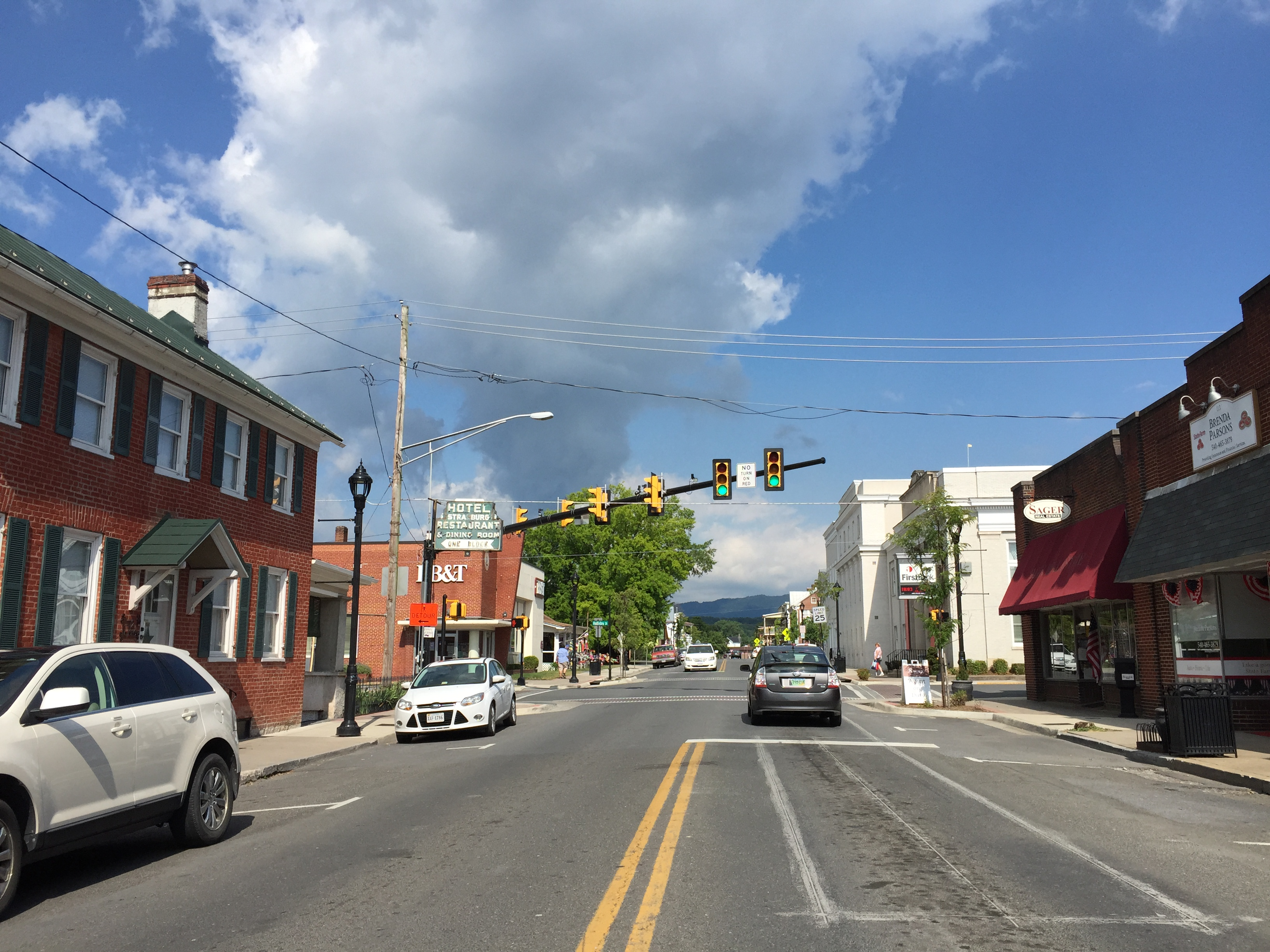
Central Strasburg

=== Museums ===
The most heralded museum in Strasburg is the Strasburg Museum. The building was once home to the Strasburg Stone and Earthenware Manufacturing Company and later was converted to a Southern Railway depot. It operated in this manner until the early 1960s. In 1970, it opened as a museum.

The now closed Stonewall Jackson Museum at Hupp's Hill was redeveloped by the Cedar Creek Battlefield Foundation and reopened on May 7, 2011, as the Hupp’s Hill Cedar Creek Museum at Hupp's Hill Historic Park. A nearby cave called Crystal Caverns at Hupp's Hill was open for tourism from 1922 to 2010.

The newest museum is the Shenandoah Museum of Contemporary Art (ShenMOCA) across from the Strasburg Museum.

=== Public art ===
Strasburg is home to the nonprofit organization, Staufferstadt Arts, which facilities the installation of contemporary murals within downtown. Thus far eight murals have been placed by well known street artists Gilf!, Alice Mizrachi, NDA, and Over Under. ShenMOCA (Shenandoah Museum of Contemporary Art) now resides in Strasburg, as well.

The historic post office in Strasburg contains a New Deal WPA mural titled Apple Orchard. Muralist Sarah Jane Blakeslee completed the work in 1938, having won a commission by the United States Treasury Section of Fine Arts.

=== Sports teams ===
In June 2011, Strasburg welcomed a Valley Baseball League team, the Strasburg Express. Strasburg High School's sports team mascot is called the "Rams". The school has teams in Football, Boys Golf, Girls Volleyball, Boys and Girls Cross Country in the fall, Boys & Girls Basketball, Boys & Girls Swim team, Wrestling in the winter, and Boys & Girls Track and Field, Boys & Girls Soccer, Boys baseball and Girls Softball in the spring. Cheerleading is a sport that continues all through the school year. The Boys Cross Country has won state championships in 1982, 1986, and 1992, and the Girls Cross Country has won state championships in 1990, 1992 and 1993. The Wrestling team has won state championships in 1980, 1987, 1997, 2000, 2022, and 2023. The Girls Volleyball team has won a state championship in 2007. The Girls Track & Field team has won state championships in 1992 & 1993. The boys baseball team won a state championship in 2007. The Cheerleading team has won state championships in 2001, 2008 & 2010.

=== Tourism ===
The Cedar Creek Battlefield and Belle Grove, Hupp House, Strasburg Historic District, Strasburg Museum, Mount Pleasant, and Stoner-Keller House and Mill are listed on the National Register of Historic Places.

Strasburg has focused on both community engagement as well as economic development and tourism in recent years. The Town of Strasburg hosts over 30 events a year, including a 12-week music series in the summer months. Some of the most popular events are the Grilled Cheese + Tomato Soup Festival, selling out at 1,000 tickets. The Fish Fry Float for Father's Day is a free event with river kayaking and environmental education. Vintage in the Valley Festival occurring on the first weekend in April boasts over 200 artisans, a vintage fashion show and car show, and local musicians. Other events include: Strasburg Film Festival, Seasonal Film Series, Cupid's Market, Shamrock Social, Pints for Paws, Sip & Snack Mural Tour, and the Harvest Festival, among others. The Strasburg Chamber of Commerce holds two additional festivals each year: Mayfest and Oktoberfest.

== Demographics ==
Historical population
Census	Pop.	Note	%±
1860	624		—
1870	580		−7.1%
1880	647		11.6%
1890	646		−0.2%
1900	690		6.8%
1910	762		10.4%
1920	650		−14.7%
1930	1,901		192.5%
1940	1,968		3.5%
1950	2,022		2.7%
1960	2,428		20.1%
1970	2,431		0.1%
1980	2,311		−4.9%
1990	3,762		62.8%
2000	4,017		6.8%
2010	6,398		59.3%
2020	7,083		10.7%
U.S. Decennial Census

As of the census of 2000, there were 4,017 people, 1,773 households, and 1,086 families residing in the town. The population density was 1,275.5 people per square mile (492.4/km^{2}). There were 1,877 housing units at an average density of 596.0 per square mile (230.1/km^{2}). The racial makeup of the town was 93.63% White, 4.48% African American, 0.05% Native American, 0.40% Asian, 0.05% Pacific Islander, 0.45% from other races, and 0.95% from two or more races. Hispanic or Latino of any race were 1.42% of the population.

There were 1,773 households, out of which 30.4% had children under the age of 18 living with them, 43.9% were married couples living together, 12.9% had a female householder with no husband present, and 38.7% were non-families. 33.1% of all households were made up of individuals, and 14.3% had someone living alone who was 65 years of age or older. The average household size was 2.27 and the average family size was 2.87.

In the town, the population was spread out, with 24.7% under the age of 18, 7.0% from 18 to 24, 32.0% from 25 to 44, 21.0% from 45 to 64, and 15.3% who were 65 years of age or older. The median age was 37 years. For every 100 females, there were 87.4 males. For every 100 females aged 18 and over, there were 85.8 males.

The median income for a household in the town was $32,724, and the median income for a family was $40,978. Males had a median income of $29,750 versus $21,755 for females. The per capita income for the town was $17,697. About 5.3% of families and 9.7% of the population were below the poverty line, including 11.7% of those under age 18 and 13.6% of those age 65 or over.

== Education ==
Students living in the northern third of Shenandoah County attend one of three public schools located near Strasburg. Kindergarten through fifth grade students attend Sandy Hook Elementary School, while sixth through eighth graders attend Signal Knob Middle School. Located within the town limits, Strasburg High School serves ninth through twelfth graders.

The schools are administered by the Shenandoah County Public Schools system, which is located in Woodstock, and the Virginia Department of Education, which is located in Richmond.

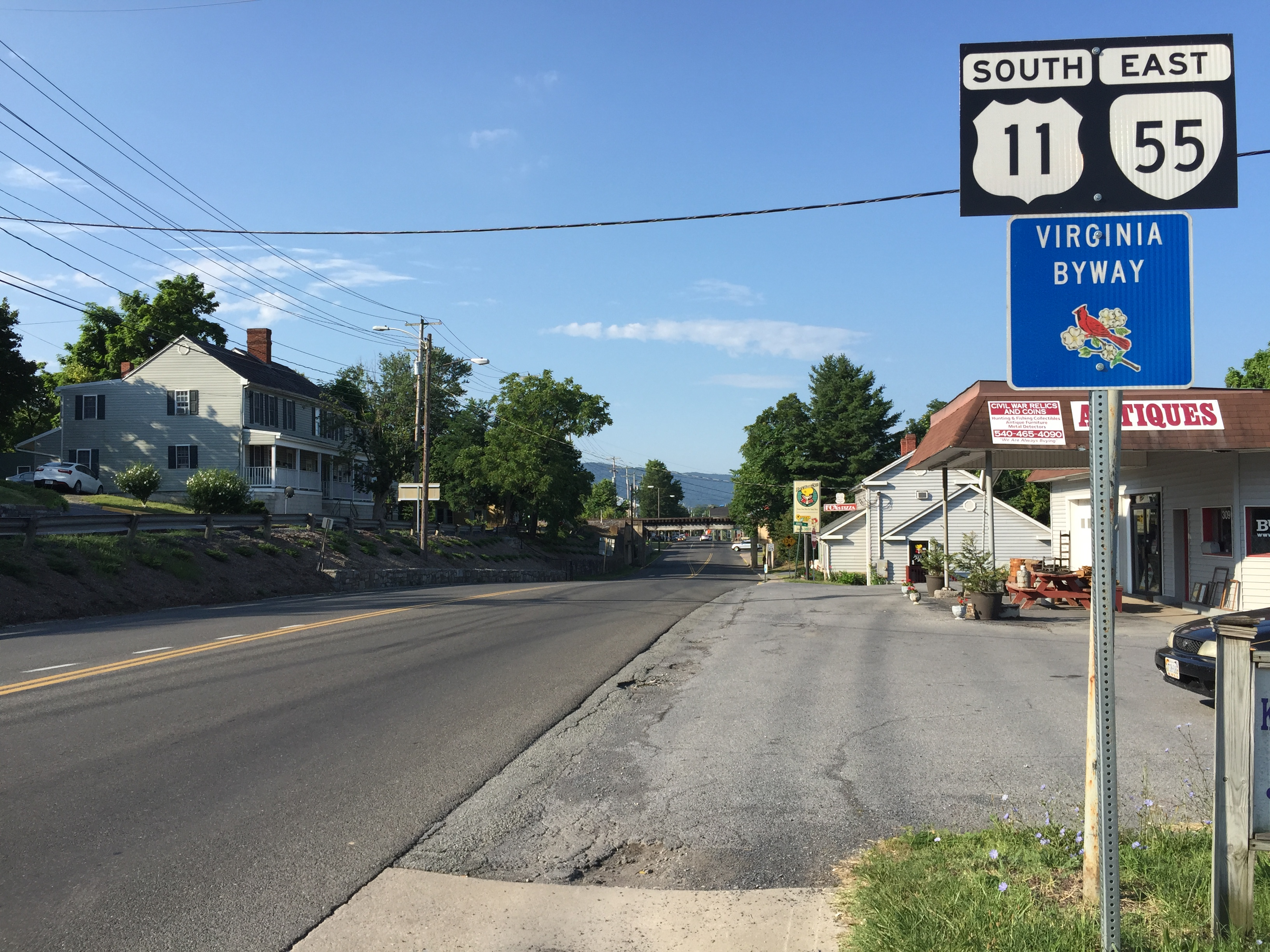
View south along US 11 and east along SR 55 in Strasburg

== Transportation ==
Strasburg is directly served by two primary highways, U.S. Route 11 and Virginia State Route 55. US 11 extends north and south, serving primarily as a local service road for nearby Interstate 81. SR 55 extends east and west, also serving primarily as a local service road for nearby Interstate 66 from Strasburg on east. West of Strasburg, SR 55 is concurrent with U.S. Route 48, which extends into eastern West Virginia. Both US 11 and SR 55 have interchanges with I-81 on the northeastern and northwestern edges of the town, respectively. I-81 extends northwards to the eastern panhandle of West Virginia, western Maryland, Pennsylvania, and New York state, and southwards to Tennessee. It also interchanges with the start of I-66 just northeast of Strasburg, which extends eastward to Washington, D.C.

The western extension of Norfolk Southern Railway's B-Line runs through Strasburg, though that section of the line was declared inactive after its last customer, the R.R. Donnelley plant in the town, closed in 2020. The CSX line running through the town, which it meets at Strasburg Junction, receives only sporadic local traffic.

== Notable people ==
- Danni Leigh, musician
- Jay Neal, Virginia Tech Football player
- Joe Bauserman, Ohio State QB
