= Winchester Royals =

Winchester Royals
Founded	1979
Field	Bridgeforth Field
Team History	Winchester Royals (1979–present)
Colors	green and yellow
Division	Northern
Championships	14 (1979) (1980) (1981) (1982) (1983) (1987) (1990) (1992) (1993) (1997) (2001) (2003) (2004) (2026)
Runner-Up	1 (1999)
President	Joe Harman
Head coach	Brian Burke

The Winchester Royals are a collegiate summer baseball team in Winchester, Virginia. They play in the Northern division of the Valley Baseball League. Founded in 1979, the Royals are the most successful team in the history of the Valley League, with thirteen Championships won — in 1979, 1980, 1982, 1983, 1987, 1990, 1992, 1993, 1997, 2001, 2003, 2004 and 2026. This is one more than the Harrisonburg Turks, and seven more than the Waynesboro Generals, which are the second and third most winning teams in the history of the Valley League.

The Royals play their home games at Bridgeforth Field, a 1,500-seat stadium located within the city-run Jim Barnett Park.

== Notable players ==
Notable former players who went on to play in the major leagues include Jimmy Key, Reggie Sanders, Kevin Kouzmanoff, Tyler Thornburg, and Kyle Snyder. Dayton Moore served as the Winchester manager in 1992 and 1993 and went on to become the general manager of the Kansas City Royals.
