= Charlottesville Tom Sox =

Baseball team in Virginia, United States

Information
- League: Valley Baseball League (South)
- Location: Charlottesville
- Ballpark: Charlottesville High School
- Founded: 2014
- League championships: 4 (2017, 2019, 2022, 2024)
- Last season: 2024: 26-13
- Colors: Blue, Green, Gray
- Mascot: Prarieweather Lewis ("Lewie")
- Management: Charlottesville Community Baseball, Inc.
- President: Chesley Mullins
- Coach: Randy Tomlin (head coach); Scott Stricklin (assistant coach); Kenny Towns (assistant coach); Adam Dofflemyer (assistant coach)

The Charlottesville Tom Sox are a collegiate summer baseball team in Charlottesville, Virginia. They play in the southern division of the Valley Baseball League.

The Tom Sox are the 2017, 2019 and 2022 Valley Baseball League Champions. They finished runner-up in 2018 & 2023.

The team plays its home games at Charlottesville High School.

== Mission ==
The Tom Sox were founded in 2014 and began play in the summer of 2015, marking the first time since 1974 Charlottesville had a team in the Valley Baseball League. The given mission of the team is to "create an unparalleled summer collegiate baseball experience through the development of our players and volunteers and engagement in and with our community, and by holding ourselves to standards of excellence and professionalism on and off the field."

== Head coaches ==
- Mike Goldberg (2015)
- Travis Thomas (2016)
- Corey Hunt (2017–19)
- Kory Koehler (2020–21)
- Ramon Garza (2022)
- Lyndon Coleman (2023)
- Randy Tomlin (2024)

== Notable players ==
- Christian Lowry and Jack Roberts of the Tom Sox's 2015 team, as well as Justin Novak from their 2016 team, won the College World Series with the University of Virginia in 2015.
- Billy Cooke of the Tom Sox's 2015 team won the College World Series with Coastal Carolina in 2016. Cooke was also the first Tom Sox player to be drafted in the MLB Draft, being drafted by the Seattle Mariners in the 8th round of the 2017 MLB June Amateur Draft.
- Cole Maye and Keenan Bell of the Tom Sox's 2017 team and Kirby McMullen of the Tom Sox's 2018 & 2019 teams won the College World Series with the University of Florida in 2017.
- Wooster's Michael Wielansky, the 2017 Valley Baseball League MVP, was drafted by the Houston Astros in the 18th round of the 2018 MLB Draft. Also drafted from the Tom Sox in 2018 were Coastal Carolina standout Seth Lancaster (2015) and Richmond closer Layne Looney (2017).
- Old Dominion's Vinnie Pasquantino, who played in Charlottesville in 2017, became the Tom Sox's first MLB player in June 2022.
- Florida outfielder Wyatt Langford played in Charlottesville in 2021 and became the team's first first-round draft pick in 2023.
