= Woodstock River Bandits =

Information
- League: Valley Baseball League (Northern Division)
- Ballpark: Central High School Baseball Complex
- Founded: 2004
- Former league(s): Southern Division (2004–2008); Northern Division (2009–present)
- Ownership: Woodstock Community Baseball League
- Coach: Mike Bocock

The Woodstock River Bandits are a collegiate summer baseball team in Woodstock, Virginia. They play in the Northern division of the Valley Baseball League.

In the 2007 Valley League Baseball playoffs, the River Bandits received the number 8 seed, but were eliminated by the Waynesboro Generals in the first round. In 2012, the River Bandits made it to the second round of the playoffs, but lost to Winchester. In 2013, the River Bandits lost in the first round of the playoffs against Aldie. In 2014, the River Bandits missed the playoffs, finishing 10th out of 11 teams in the VBL. The Bandits made the playoffs in 2015 as the #4 seed. They were eliminated in the first round of the playoffs by the Front Royal Cardinals. In 2016, the Bandits finished at a franchise worst 11–31, which was the worst record in the league since Rockbridge in 2009. In 2018, Woodstock went a league history worst 5–37, finishing last in the VBL. Woodstock hired Mike Bocock to lead the team in 2019. Bocock was already an inductee in the VBL Hall of Fame. In 2019, Woodstock finished the regular season with a 25–17 record, finishing 2nd in the VBL Northern division behind the Strasburg Express. The River Bandits reached the playoffs, but were knocked off in the Northern division finals by Strasburg.
