= Purcellville Cannons =

Collegiate summer baseball team in Purcellville, Virginia

Information
- League: Valley Baseball League (2010: No division 2009: Central Division; 2001–2008: Northern Division)
- Location: Purcellville, VA
- Ballpark: Fireman's Field
- League championships: 7 (1965, 1966, 1967, 1968, 2006, 2008, 2010
- Former name: Luray Colonials (1958–1969†); Luray Wranglers (2001–2012); Charles Town Cannons (2013–2015)
- Ownership: Don & Brett Fuller (President)
- General manager: Ridge Fuller
- Manager: Brett Fuller (Head Coach)
- Website: purcellvillecannons.org

The Purcellville Cannons are a collegiate summer baseball team in Purcellville, Virginia. They play in the north division of the Valley Baseball League. The team plays its home games at Fireman's Field, located adjacent to Bush Tabernacle.

== History ==
The Wranglers were the second team to represent Luray in the Valley League. The Luray Colonials competed in the Valley League from 1958 to 1969. The Colonials won the Valley Baseball League championship for four years straight, from 1965 to 1968.

- In 2000, baseball returned to the town of Luray and that following June, the team took the field for the first time as the Wranglers. In the 2001 season, the Wranglers had a record of 13–27.
- In 2002, the Wranglers finished with a record of 15–25.
- In 2003, the Wranglers finished with a record of 15–25.
- In 2004, the Wranglers finished with their first record above .500 and finished in second place in the Northern Division. The Wranglers final record was 23–21.
- In 2005, the Wranglers were the Northern Division regular season champions/pennant winners, with an impressive record of 30 wins and 14 losses. They were the most successful in the team's short history, however they fell in the playoffs.
- In 2006, the Wranglers completed the regular season with 31 wins and 21 losses and were the 2006 Northern Division Champions and the 2006 Valley Baseball League Champions, with a final record of 38 wins and 23 losses.
- In 2007, the Wranglers received the #3 seed, advanced to the championship round, and became league runner up. Their regular season record was 26 wins and 18 losses.
- In 2008, the Wranglers completed the regular season with a record of 30 wins and 14 losses. The Wranglers won the 2008 Jim Lineweaver Cup, after defeating Covington in the Championship. Their final record was 37 wins and 15 losses, the best record in Wranglers history.
- In 2010, The Luray Wranglers won the Valley League Baseball Championship with a 33–18 record.
- At the end of the 2012 season the Wranglers moved to Charles Town, West Virginia and became the Cannons.
- In September 2015, the Cannons moved from Charles Town to their current home in Purcellville, Virginia.

=== Additional notes ===
†=The Colonials left the Valley League in 1971 and became part of the Rockingham County Baseball League, before disbanding in 1973.

== Retired numbers ==
Cannons Retired Numbers
No.	Year	Name	Position(s)	Seasons	Highlights
29	2023	Ryne Guida	DH, 1B	2022, 2023	Valley League MVP ('22 & '23); 1st 2-time MVP since Daniel Murphy ('04 & '05)
69	2026	Will Ricketts	LHP	2023-2026	

== Season results ==
Cannons Season Results
Years	Wins	Losses	Postseason	VBL All-Stars
2013	23	21	Lost Rd 1 Series (Strasburg)	Matt Durst (C, S. Mississippi); Waldyvan Estrada (OF, Alabama St.); Adam Parks (RHP, Liberty); Chris Payne (RHP, George Mason)
2014	23	19	Won Rd 1 Series (Staunton); Won Rd 2 Series (Strasburg); VBL Runners-Up (Waynesboro)	Jake Anthony (RHP, Georgia College); Matthew Gandy (C, Chapman); Stephen Kerr (INF, FAU); Austin Stephens (LHP, Grand Rapids CC)
2015	16	26	Did Not Qualify	Steven Ridings (RHP, Messiah); Bradley Jones (INF, College of Charleston); Justin Flores (RHP, S. Alabama); Christian Khawam (OF, FIU)
2016	19	25	Lost Rd 1 Series (Strasburg)	Ray Hernandez (OF, Alabama St.); Diandre Amion (OF, Alabama St.)
2017	27	18	Lost Rd 1 Series (Winchester)	Sheldon Reed (OF, Clemson); Thomas Sutera (RHP, Siena); Dalton Whitaker (RHP, Winthrop); Trevin Esquerra (INF, Loyola-Marymount)
2018	25	19	Lost Rd 1 Series (Winchester)	Dalton Oates (LHP, Shippensburg); Anthony Zimmerman (RHP, Fordham); Christian Garabedian (INF, St. Thomas); Kenny Oyama (OF, Loyola-Marymount)
2019	15	27	Did Not Qualify	Jose Aquino (INF, San Jacinto); Travis Keys (LHP, Aquinas)
2020	No Team in 2020 – COVID-19 Pandemic			
2021	11	29	Did Not Qualify	Joe Vogatsky (RHP, James Madison); Matt Posten (RHP, Florence-Darlington)
2022	21	24	Won Rd 1 Series (Strasburg); Lost Rd 2 Series (Woodstock)	Tyler Muscar (LHP, James Madison); Joe Vogatsky (RHP, James Madison); Andrew Washington (RHP, Seminole St.); Bear Madliak (C, Georgia); Justin Acal (INF, Frederick CC); Ryne Guida (INF, FIU)
2023	20	24	Did Not Qualify	Mikey Briton (UTL, Arkansas-Ft. Smith); Cullen "Bear" Horowicz (INF, Samford); Jose Torres (C, Louisiana Lafayette); Mac Ayres (RHP, Purdue-Ft. Wayne); Mauricio Rodriguez (RHP, Rice); Ryne Guida (DH, FIU)
2024	27	16	Rd 1 Bye; Won Rd 2 Series (Strasburg); VBL Runners-Up (Charlottesville)	Zachary Duenas (P, Western Kentucky); David Eckaus (P, FIU); Nick Gravel (P, Keystone); Shintaro Inoue (INF, Kansas St.); Mitsuki Kohno (Christian Brothers); Bear Madliak (C, Kansas St.)
2025	22	18	Won Rd 1 Game (New Market); Won Rd 2 Game (Woodstock); Lost Rd 3 Game (Strasburg)	Mitsuki Kohno (INF, Johnson U.); Thomas Marsala (INF, Northwestern St. / Game MVP); Anthony Fernandez (OF, St. Bonaventure); Ethan Acevedo (OF, VCU); Connor Hensley (P, Campbell); Nick Staszak (P, Mercer); Corey Costello (P, Radford)
2026	20	19	Lost Rd 1 Series (Strasburg)	Vincenzo Cusat (INF, Frederick CC); Shintaro Inoue (INF, Kansas St.); Merrick Beamish (RHP, N. Central Texas)
Totals	269	285		

== Players who have gone on to a professional career ==
Minor Leaguers
Name	Position	College/HS	Drafted/Signed	Highest Level
Emmanuel Marrero	SS	Alabama St.	Rd 7 (2014)	AA
Adam Parks	RHP	Liberty	Rd 33 (2014)	AA
Mike Estevez	RHP	Alabama St.	UDFA (2015)	A-
Stephen Kerr	2B	Florida Atlantic	UDFA (2017)	AA
Chaz Pal	OF	S. Carolina-Aiken	Rd 38 (2016)	RK
Greg Brodzinski	C	Barry	Rd 18 (2015)	AA
Jack Charleston	RHP	Faulkner	Rd 30 (2015)	AA
Bradley Jones	1B	College of Charleston	Rd 18 (2016)	A+
Erik Garcia	1B	Missouri Baptist	UDFA (2015)	A+
Steven Ridings	RHP	Messiah	Rd 29 (2016)	AAA
Dillon Drabble	RHP	Seminole St.	Rd 17 (2016)	A
Riley Echols	RHP	Freed Hardeman	Rd 24 (2017)	A+
Tyler Ratliff	3B	Marshall	Rd 17 (2017)	A+
DeAires Moses	OF	Volunteer St.	Rd 19 (2016)	A
Malik Jones	RHP	Missouri Baptist	Rd 23 (2017)	A-
Ray Hernandez	3B	Alabama St.	Rd 29 (2018)	RK
Hunter Peck	LHP	Georgia Gwinnett	UDFA (2020)	AA
Trevin Esquerra	OF	Loyola-Marymount	UDFA (2020)	A+
Sheldon Reed	RHP	Clemson	UDFA (2020)	AAA
Tom Sutera	RHP	Siena	UDFA (2018)	A+
Luke Berryhill	C	South Carolina	Rd 13 (2019)	AAA
Kyle Hayes	C	James Madison	UDFA (2022)	AAA
Dylan Heid	RHP	Pittsburgh-Johnstown	Rd 11 (2021)	AAA
Matthew Koehler	OF	W. Carolina	Rd 31 (2019)	RK
Matt Marsili	RHP	James Madison	UDFA (2021)	RK
Anthony Zimmerman	RHP	Fordham	UDFA (2019)	A
Michael Brewer	RHP	Eastern Kentucky	UDFA (2023)	A
Jhonny Felix	RHP	W. Oklahoma St.	Rd 21 (2019)	A
Blaze Pontes	RHP	Hawaii	Rd 16 (2022)	AA
Allan Saathoff	RHP	Erskine	UDFA (2022)	AA
Sam Knowlton	RHP	South Alabama	Rd 12 (2023)	A+
Keegan Zinn	RHP	Lake Minneloa HS	Rd 12 (2023)	A
Brooks Caple	RHP	Lamar	Rd 9 (2024)	AA
Rocco Reid	LHP	Clemson	Rd 15 (2024)	A+
Victor Figueroa	1B	Florida SW St.	Rd 18 (2024)	AA
Joe Vogatsky	RHP	James Madison	Rd 19 (2024)	AA
Jaxon Dalena	RHP	Shippensburg	Rd 6 (2025)	A+
Kaleb Freeman	OF	Georgia State	Rd 16 (2025)	A+
Dylan King	C	Central Florida	Rd 17 (2025)	A
Landry Jurecka	RHP	Queens College of Charlotte	Rd 18 (2025)	AA
Kyle Johnson	LHP	Virginia	Rd 6 (2026)	RK
Carlos Sanchez	UTL	LSU Shreveport	Rd 10 (2026)	A
Bear Madliak	C	Kansas State	Rd 18 (2026)	RK
Jatniel McCloud	OF	Amarillo College	Rd 18 (2026)	RK
Brennan Hudson	C	Georgia	Rd 20 (2026	A+
Shintaro Inoue	INF	Kansas State	UDFA (2026)	RK
Michael Gupton	OF	Memphis	UDFA (2026)	AA

Major Leaguers
Name	Position	College/HS	Drafted/Signed	Career Highlights
Tom Bradley	RHP	Maryland	Rd 7 (1968)	
Brian Bocock	SS	Stetson	Rd 9 (2006)	
Daniel Murphy	2B	Jacksonville	Rd 13 (2006)	3x All-Star; NLCS MVP; 2x Silver Slugger
Eddy Rodriguez	C	Miami	Rd 20 (2006)	
Eric Campbell	3B	Boston College	Rd 8 (2008)	
Yonder Alonso	1B	Miami	Rd 1 (2008)	All-Star ('17)
Elih Villanueva	RHP	Florida St.	Rd 27 (2008)	
Ryan Schimpf	2B	LSU	Rd 5 (2009)	
Alex Wimmers	RHP	Ohio St.	Rd 1 (2010)	
Drew Rucinski	RHP	Ohio St.	UDFA (2011)	
Jacob Wilson	2B	Memphis	Rd 10 (2012)	
Austin Gomber	LHP	Florida Atlantic	Rd 4 (2014)	
Ryan Yarbrough	LHP	Old Dominion	Rd 4 (2014)	Team USA (2026)
