= Valley Baseball League =

Collegiate summer baseball league

- Classification: Collegiate
- Sport: Baseball
- Founded: 1923
- President: Vacant
- Commissioner: Vacant
- Motto: "Gateway to the majors"
- No. of teams: 12
- Country: United States
- Most recent champion: Winchester Royals (2026)
- Website: Valley Baseball League

The Valley Baseball League is an NCAA and MLB-sanctioned collegiate summer baseball league in the Shenandoah Valley region of Virginia.

The league was started in 1923 and sanctioned by the NCAA in 1961. It has been a wooden bat league since 1993. It is one of the twelve leagues in the National Alliance of College Summer Baseball. The VBL is funded in part by a grant from Major League Baseball. The Valley League has produced well over 1,000 professional baseball players, including a record 79 former players drafted in the 2008 Major League Baseball First-Year Player Draft.

In 2007, the Valley Baseball League expanded to include one new team with the addition of the Fauquier Gators. Another team was planned to be added in Lexington, Virginia but difficulties with the lighting system delayed the team's addition to the league. The VBL announced in July 2008 that the Rockbridge Rapids would start play in the 2009 season, but the team folded a couple years later. In 2011 the Strasburg Express entered the league and in 2015 the Charlottesville Tom Sox entered the league.

The league canceled the 2020 season due to the COVID-19 pandemic.

The Culpeper Cavaliers joined as the league's 12th team in 2023.

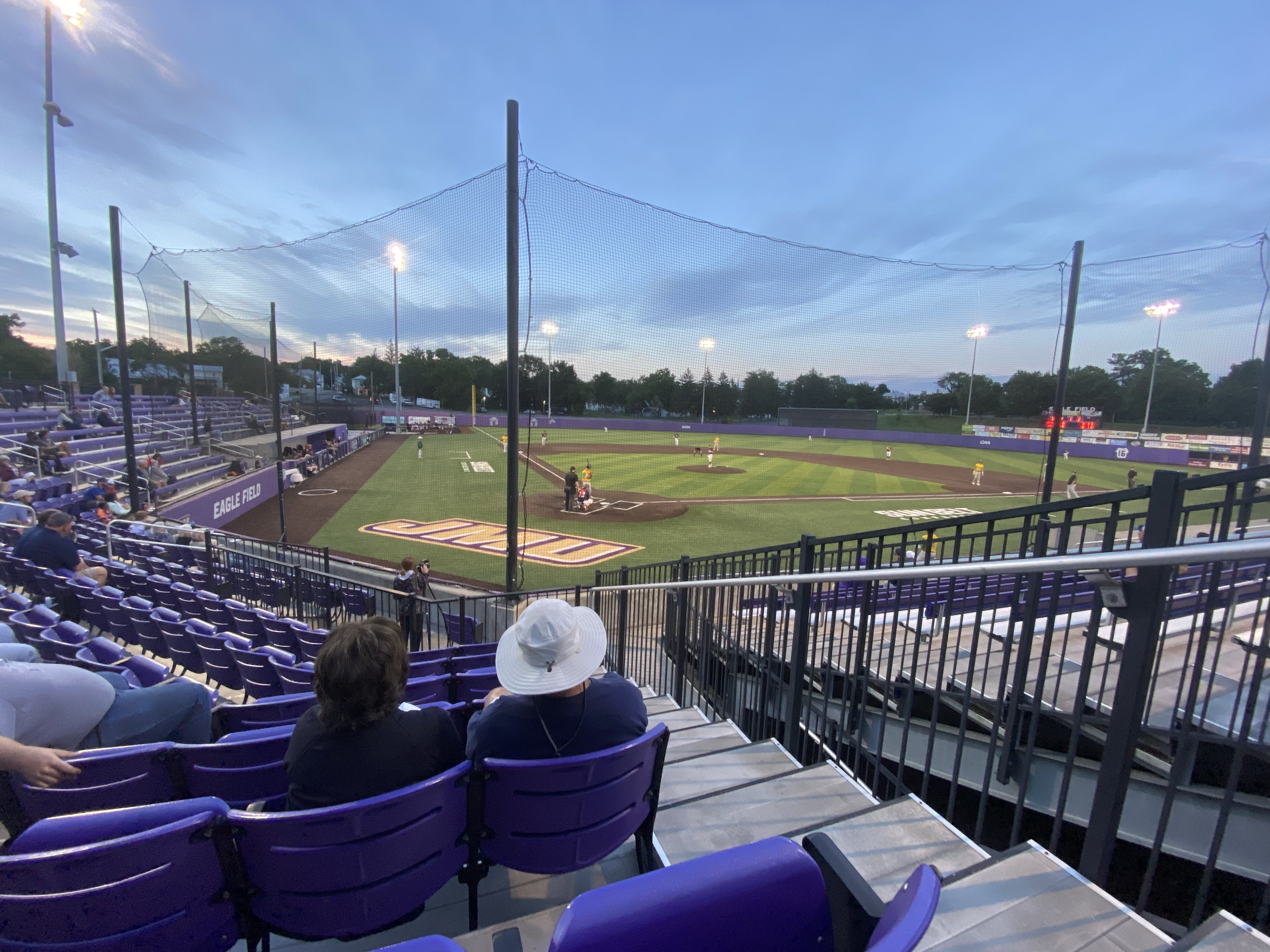
The Harrisonburg Turks host the Winchester Royals in a Valley Baseball League game in June 2022.

== Current teams ==
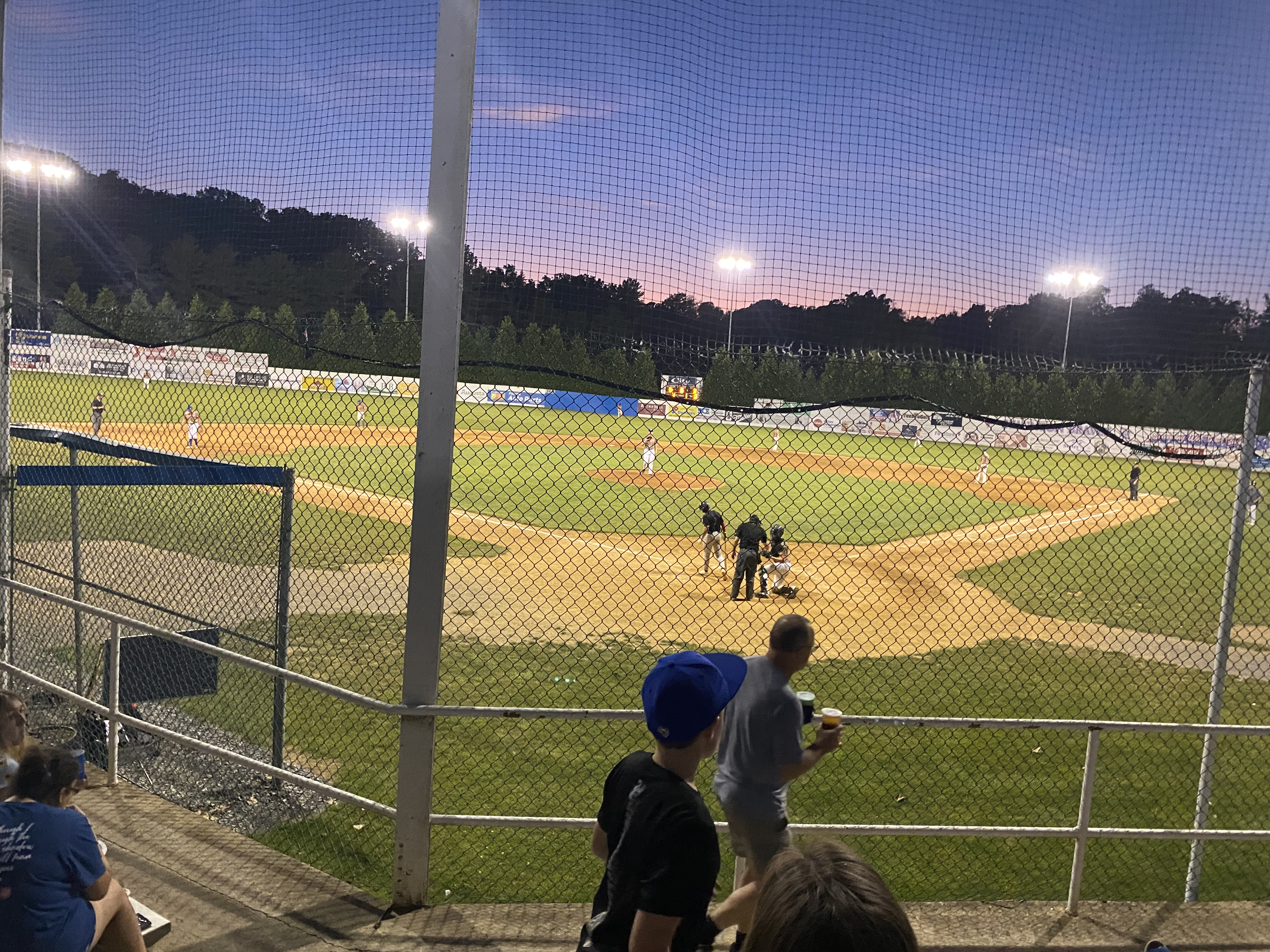
John Moxie Memorial Stadium, home of the Staunton Braves since the Valley League's inception in 1923.

Team	City	Stadium	Capacity
Charlottesville Tom Sox	Charlottesville	CHO Airport Field	1,200
Covington Lumberjacks	Covington	Casey Field	2,000
Culpeper Cavaliers	Culpeper	Culpeper County High School	
Front Royal Cardinals	Front Royal	Bing Crosby Stadium	1,500
Harrisonburg Turks	Harrisonburg	Eagle Field at Veterans Memorial Park	1,200
New Market Rebels	New Market	Rebel Park	550
Purcellville Cannons	Purcellville	Fireman's Field	2,000
Staunton Braves	Staunton	John Moxie Stadium	1,200
Strasburg Express	Strasburg	First Bank Park	
Winchester Royals	Winchester	Bridgeforth Field	1,200
Woodstock River Bandits	Woodstock	Central High School Field	796
Waynesboro Generals	Waynesboro	Kate Collins Field at Union Home Mortgage Park	350

== Former teams ==
Team	City	Years active
Aldie Senators	Aldie	2013-2015
Charles Town Cannons	Charles Town, WV	2013-2015
Charlottesville Hornets	Charlottesville	1967-1974
Elkton Blue Sox	Elkton	1954-1957
Fauquier Gators	Warrenton	2007-2009
Haymarket Battle Cats	Haymarket	2005
Haymarket Senators	Haymarket	2006-2012
Loudoun Rangers	Middleburg	2004
Luray Colonials	Luray	1963-1969
Luray Wranglers	Luray	2001-2012
Madison Blue Jays	Madison	1969-1988
Rockbridge Rapids	Lexington	2009-2013
Shenandoah Indians	Shenandoah	1958-1975

== Season structure ==
The regular season consists of 44 games played beginning the first week of June and continuing until late July. Through the 2019 season, teams played all inter-division opponents 3 times and intra-division opponents 5 or 6 times. Beginning in 2021, teams no longer travel to every other ballpark in a single season: rather, all inter-division meetings were scheduled as a single, 7-inning weekend doubleheader. This format was continued in 2022 but with the home teams reversed.

In 2023, the league eliminated divisions and moved to a scheduling model where each team played each other four times for an expanded 44-game schedule, an addition of two games from the previous 42.

In 2024, the league again adopted a new scheduling model where teams play games within their respective divisions for the entirety of the season. The league also reverted to a 40-game season with a change of playoff formatting.

== Playoff format ==
Playoffs begin immediately following the regular season and continue into late July. In all series, the higher seeded team hosts games 1 and 3. No off-days are taken except for rain-outs and while waiting on other series' to finish.

First Round
#1 vs. #8 (Best 2 of 3 games)
#2 vs. #7 (Best 2 of 3 games)
#3 vs. #6 (Best 2 of 3 games)
#4 vs. #5 (Best 2 of 3 games)

Semifinals
#1/#8 vs. #4/#5 (Best 2 of 3 games)
#2/#7 vs. #3/#6 (Best 2 of 3 games)

Championship
Matchup of semifinal series winners (Best 2 of 3 games)

== VBL champions ==
Year	VBL Champion	Runner-up	Series
2026	Winchester Royals	Charlottesville Tom Sox	2-1
2025	Strasburg Express	Charlottesville Tom Sox	2-1
2024	Charlottesville Tom Sox	Purcellville Cannons	2-1
2023	Harrisonburg Turks	Charlottesville Tom Sox	2-0
2022	Charlottesville Tom Sox	Woodstock River Bandits	2-0
2021	Strasburg Express	Waynesboro Generals	2-0
2020	None (Note: Season cancelled due to COVID-19 pandemic)	None	N/A
2019	Charlottesville Tom Sox	Strasburg Express	2-0
2018	New Market Rebels	Charlottesville Tom Sox	2-0
2017	Charlottesville Tom Sox	Strasburg Express	2-1
2016	Strasburg Express	Waynesboro Generals	2-0
2015	Strasburg Express	Staunton Braves	2-1
2014	Waynesboro Generals	Charles Town Cannons	2-1
2013	Waynesboro Generals	Strasburg Express	2-1
2012	Harrisonburg Turks	Winchester Royals	3-1
2011	Covington Lumberjacks	Rockbridge Rapids	2-1
2010	Luray Wranglers	Front Royal Cardinals	2-0
2009	Haymarket Senators	Covington Lumberjacks	3-1
2008	Luray Wranglers	Covington Lumberjacks	3-0
2007	Waynesboro Generals	Luray Wranglers	4-1
2006	Luray Wranglers	Staunton Braves	3-2
2005	Covington Lumberjacks	New Market Rebels	2-1
2004	Winchester Royals	Staunton Braves	2-0
2003	Winchester Royals	New Market Rebels	3-2
2002	New Market Rebels	Covington Lumberjacks	3-1
2001	Winchester Royals	Covington Lumberjacks	3-2
2000	Harrisonburg Turks	Staunton Braves	3-0
1999	Staunton Braves	Winchester Royals	3-0
1998	Waynesboro Generals	Staunton Braves	3-0
1997	Winchester Royals	Front Royal Cardinals	Forfeit
1996	Staunton Braves	Harrisonburg Turks	3-1
1995	Staunton Braves	Waynesboro Generals	3-0
1994	New Market Rebels	Harrisonburg Turks	3-2
1993	Winchester Royals	Staunton Braves	3-2
1992	Winchester Royals	Harrisonburg Turks	3-1
1991	Harrisonburg Turks	Front Royal Cardinals	3-1
1990	Winchester Royals	Staunton Braves	3-2
1989	New Market Rebels	Harrisonburg Turks	3-1
1988	Waynesboro Generals	Madison Blue Jays	3-2
1987	Winchester Royals	Waynesboro Generals	3-0
1986	Front Royal Cardinals	Harrisonburg Turks	3-1
1985	Staunton Braves	New Market Rebels	3-0
1984	Waynesboro Generals	Harrisonburg Turks	3-0
1983	Winchester Royals	Staunton Braves	4-3
1982	Winchester Royals	New Market Rebels	3-0
1981	Winchester Royals	New Market Rebels	4-0
1980	Winchester Royals	New Market Rebels	3-1
1979	Winchester Royals	Madison Blue Jays	4-3
1978	Madison Blue Jays	Harrisonburg Turks	4-1
1977	Harrisonburg Turks	Waynesboro Generals	4-0
1976	Staunton Braves	Harrisonburg Turks	4-0
1975	Madison Blue Jays	Harrisonburg Turks	4-2
1974	Shenandoah Indians	Waynesboro Generals	4-2
1973	Shenandoah Indians	Madison Blue Jays	4-2
1972	Shenandoah Indians	Charlottesville Hornets	4-2
1971	Harrisonburg Turks	Shenandoah Indians	4-0
1970	Harrisonburg Turks	New Market Rebels	4-1
1969	Harrisonburg Turks	Staunton Braves	4-0
1968	Luray Colonials	Harrisonburg Turks	4-0
1967	Luray Colonials	Harrisonburg Turks	2-0
1966	Luray Colonials	Shenandoah Indians	4-1
1965	Luray Colonials	New Market Rebels	4-2
1964	Harrisonburg Turks	Shenandoah Indians	4-0
1963	Shenandoah Indians	New Market Rebels	4-1
1962	Harrisonburg Turks	Shenandoah Indians	4-2
1961	Shenandoah Indians	Harrisonburg Turks	4-0
1960	Shenandoah Indians	Staunton Braves	4-3
1959	Harrisonburg Turks	New Market Rebels	4-2
1958	Harrisonburg Turks	New Market Rebels	4-3
1957	Staunton Braves	Harrisonburg Turks	4-3
1956	Staunton Braves	Shenandoah Indians	4-2
1955	Harrisonburg Turks	Shenandoah Indians	4-3
1954	Staunton Braves	Elkton Blue Sox	4-1

=== Championships per team ===
- Winchester -14
- Harrisonburg -13
- Luray-7
- Shenandoah -6
- Staunton -6
- Waynesboro -6
- New Market -4
- Charlottesville -4
- Strasburg -4
- Covington -2
- Madison -2
- Elkton -1
- Front Royal -1
- Haymarket -1

Not all teams have been with VBL since 1954. Throughout its history, teams have been removed and added.

The summer of 2008 was highlighted by a promotion called Around the Valley in 60 Days. This promotion was started by Crystal Clear Delivery and S. Carter Studios and encouraged patrons to visit all 11 parks in the 60-day season. The program was deemed a huge success as some fifty fans completed the program and attended all 11 ballparks.

== Notable players ==
- Daniel Murphy Luray '04 '05
- Brett Gardner, New Market '03 Center Field
- Ben Guez, Covington '06
- Jason Kipnis, Covington '07, second baseman for the Cleveland Indians
- Collin Cowgill, Covington
- Javier Lopez, New Market '96
- Mike Lowell, Waynesboro '93
- Mike Maroth, Staunton '96 '97
- Kyle Snyder, Winchester '97
- Cory Spangenberg, Winchester '10
- Aubrey Huff, Staunton
- Luke Scott, Staunton
- Juan Pierre, Harrisonburg
- Steve Finley, Harrisonburg
- Clint Robinson, Harrisonburg '05
- Mo Vaughn, Harrisonburg
- Jon Rauch, Harrisonburg
- David Eckstein, Harrisonburg
- Chris Hoiles, Harrisonburg
- Chris Devenski, Woodstock
- Guido Knudson, Woodstock
- Yonder Alonso, Luray '06
- Johnny Oates, Waynesboro
- Denny Walling, Waynesboro
- Wayne Comer, Shenandoah
- Jerry May, Staunton
- Jon Jay, Staunton '04
- Chris Perez, Staunton '04
- Ryan Schimpf, Luray '08
- Roberto Hernandez, Front Royal
- Eddy Rodriguez, Luray '05 & '06
- Jim Morris, Charlottesville
- Tom Browning, New Market
- Dan Pasqua, New Market
- Jimmy Key, Winchester
- Alex Wimmers, Luray '08
- Drew Rucinski, Luray '08
- Brian Bocock, Luray '04
- Erik Kratz, Waynesboro and Harrisonburg
- Mike Cubbage, Charlottesville
- Rick Honeycutt, Charlottesville
- Billy Sample, Harrisonburg
- Kirt Manwaring, Waynesboro
- Rich Rodriguez, Staunton
- Reggie Sanders, Front Royal
- Wayne Tolleson, Staunton
- Vic Correll, Staunton
- John Kruk, New Market
- Sam Perlozzo, Waynesboro and New Market
- Jason Michaels, Staunton
- John Pawlowski, Staunton
- Chad Tracy, Staunton
- Tommy La Stella, Haymarket
- Darrell Whitmore, Front Royal
- Vinnie Pasquantino, Charlottesville '17
- Graham Ashcraft, Waynesboro '18
- Rhett Lowder, Strasburg '21
- Wyatt Langford, Charlottesville '21
