= Strasburg Express =

The Strasburg Express are a collegiate summer baseball team playing in the Northern Division of the Valley Baseball League. The team is based in Strasburg, Virginia and plays its home games at First Bank Park, on the grounds of Sandy Hook Elementary School. Strasburg joined the league in 2011, replacing the defunct Fauquier Gators. The Express have won four Valley League championships, in 2015, 2016, 2021 and 2025. Following the 2016 championship, the team was ranked 8th in the nation among collegiate summer teams. The team's current coach is Phil Betterly, who joined the team for the 2024 season. A previous manager includes former New York Yankees third baseman Charlie Hayes, who managed the team in 2016 after serving as the director of scouting the year before.
