= Eddy Rodríguez (catcher) =

Cuban-American baseball player & coach (born 1985)

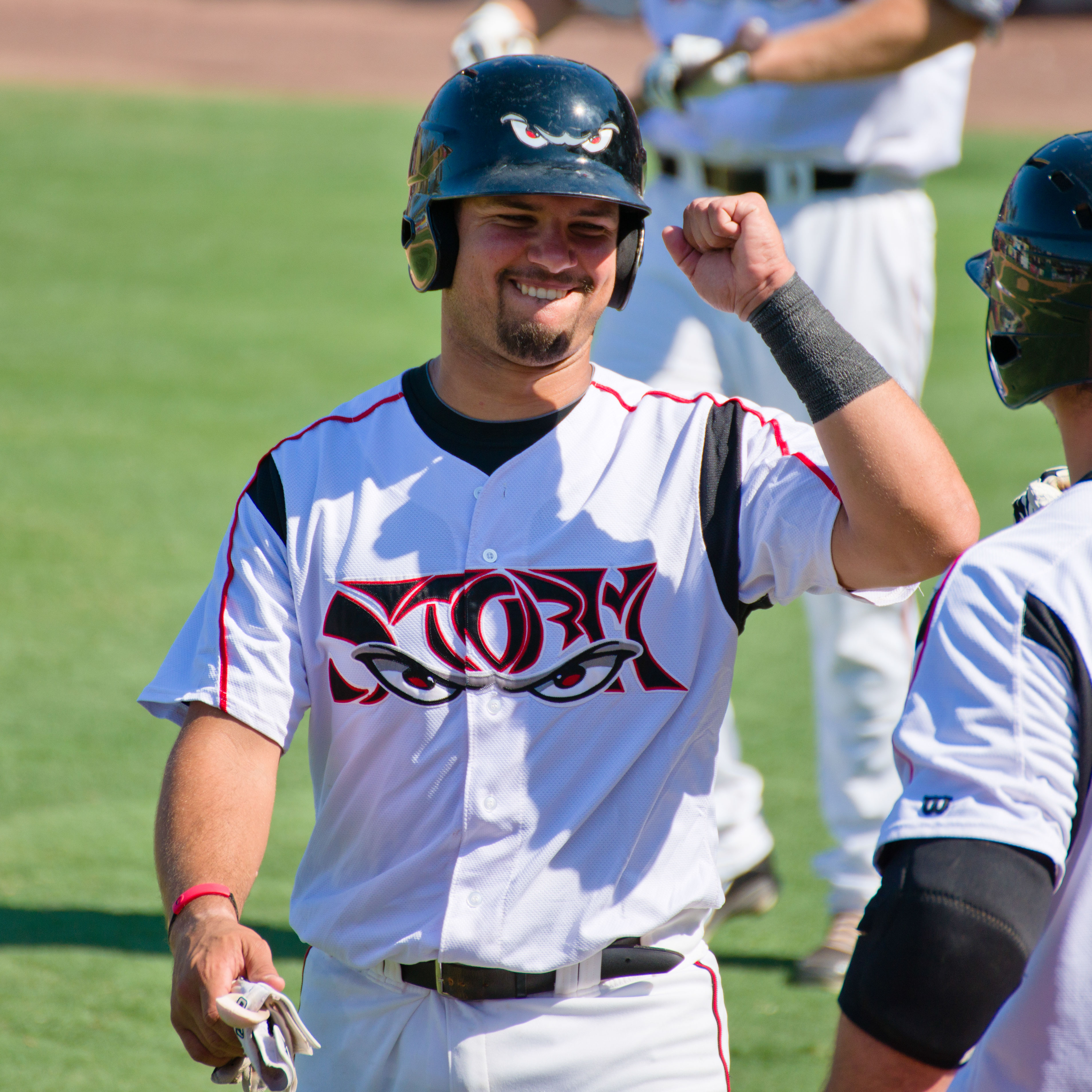
- Rodríguez with the Lake Elsinore Storm in 2012
- Catcher / Coach
- Born: December 1, 1985 (age 40); Villa Clara, Cuba
- Batted: Right Threw: Right

MLB debut
- August 2, 2012, for the San Diego Padres

Last MLB appearance
- August 6, 2012, for the San Diego Padres

MLB statistics
- Batting average: .200
- Home runs: 1
- Runs batted in: 1
- Stats at Baseball Reference

Teams
- As player: San Diego Padres (2012); As coach: Miami Marlins (2020–2022)

Eddy Rodríguez (born December 1, 1985) is a Cuban-American professional baseball former catcher and coach. He was the catching coach for the Miami Marlins of Major League Baseball (MLB) from 2020 to 2022. He played in MLB for the San Diego Padres.

Rodríguez's family defected from Cuba on his father's fishing boat when he was eight years old, nearly dying on the journey. Rodríguez played college baseball for the University of Miami before beginning his professional career.

== Early life ==
Rodríguez was born in Villa Clara Province, Cuba. His parents, Edilio and Ylya Rodriguez, operated a farm and his father fished.

The Rodríguez family, consisting of Eddy, his parents, his sister Yanisbet, and his cousin Carlos, defected from Cuba when he was eight years old on his father's fishing boat. Eddy was unaware of the defection until they were at sea. Their boat nearly capsized in a storm and they ran out of food, resorting to eating ground coffee beans, before they were discovered by the United States Coast Guard. The family settled in Miami and Rodríguez graduated from Coral Gables Senior High School in Coral Gables, Florida.

== Baseball career ==
=== Cincinnati Reds ===
Rodríguez received a scholarship from the University of Miami, where he played college baseball as the starting catcher for the Miami Hurricanes baseball team. The Cincinnati Reds drafted Rodríguez in the 20th round of the 2006 Major League Baseball draft. He played in the Reds minor league baseball organization until 2009, reaching Double–A with the Chattanooga Lookouts of the Southern League, when he began playing independent league baseball.

=== El Paso Diablos/Sioux Falls Pheasants ===
Rodríguez played in the American Association of Independent Professional Baseball for the El Paso Diablos in 2009 and the Sioux Falls Pheasants in 2010.

=== San Diego Padres ===
In 2011, Rodríguez returned to organized baseball when he signed a minor league contract with the San Diego Padres. He was promoted to the Padres on August 1, 2012, from the Lake Elsinore Storm of the High–A California League, after starting catcher Yasmani Grandal was placed on the disabled list.

Rodríguez made his Major League debut on August 2, 2012, against the Cincinnati Reds. He hit a home run off of Johnny Cueto in his first major league at-bat. Rodríguez made two starts for the Padres in 2012, going 1 for 5 at the plate. He was optioned to the Triple-A Tucson Padres on August 9 when opening-day catcher Nick Hundley was recalled.

On September 4, 2012, Rodríguez was designated for assignment and moved off the 40-man roster. The Padres re-signed Rodríguez as a minor-league free agent and invited him to 2013 spring training.

=== Tampa Bay Rays ===
On January 15, 2014, Rodríguez signed a minor league contract with the Tampa Bay Rays. In 13 games for the Triple-A Durham Bulls, he batted .152/.204/.239 with one home run and four RBI. Rodríguez was released by the Rays organization on May 5.

=== New York Yankees ===
On January 16, 2015, Rodríguez signed a minor league contract with the New York Yankees organization. In 57 games split between the Double–A Trenton Thunder and Triple–A Scranton/Wilkes-Barre RailRiders, he compiled a .171/.202/.261 batting line with three home runs and 20 RBI. On February 5, 2016, Rodríguez received a non–roster invitation to spring training. He spent the 2016 campaign back with Scranton, hitting .214/.265/.329 with three home runs and 13 RBI across 44 appearances. Rodríguez elected free agency following the season on November 7, 2016.

On December 15, 2016, Rodríguez signed a minor league contract with the Minnesota Twins. The Twins released him after spring training, and he signed a minor league contract with the Yankees on April 3, 2017. Rodríguez spent the year with the Triple–A Scranton/Wilkes-Barre RailRiders, playing in 83 games and hitting .177/.227/.298 with eight home runs and 31 RBI. He elected free agency following the season on November 6, 2017, and ended his playing career.

== Coaching career ==
Rodríguez served as the Los Angeles Angels minor league catching coordinator in 2019. Rodríguez was named the catching coach for the Miami Marlins prior to the 2020 season.

== See also ==
- List of baseball players who defected from Cuba
- List of Major League Baseball players with a home run in their first major league at bat
