= James Wilkins =

James Wilkins may refer to:

- James C. Wilkins (1787–1849), American businessman and Mississippi territorial legislator
- James N. Kienitz Wilkins, American filmmaker, artist, and writer
- James R. Wilkins Jr. (born 1945), American entrepreneur, philanthropist, and community leader
- James R. Wilkins Sr. (1910–1996), his father, American retailer, developer, community leader, and philanthropist
