= Shenandoah Hornets =

College athletics teams at Shenandoah University, Virginia, United States

- University: Shenandoah University
- Nickname: Hornets
- NCAA: Division III
- Conference: ODAC (primary)
- Athletic director: Bill Stewart (interim)
- Location: Winchester, Virginia
- Varsity teams: 23
- Football stadium: Glo Fiber Field at Shentel Stadium
- Basketball arena: James R. Wilkins, Jr. Athletics & Events Center
- Colors: Red and Blue
- Mascot: Buzzy
- Website: suhornets.com
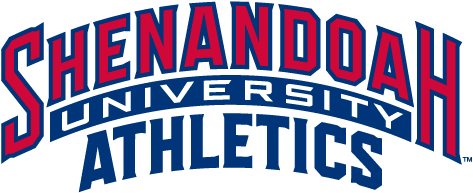

The Shenandoah Hornets are the athletic teams that represent Shenandoah University, located in Winchester, Virginia, in intercollegiate sports. The Hornets are members of the NCAA's Division III and the Old Dominion Athletic Conference (ODAC). Shenandoah joined the ODAC in 2012 after previously competing in the USA South Athletic Conference (USA South) from 1992-2012.

== Varsity teams ==
Shenandoah University competes in 23 intercollegiate varsity sports.

Men's sports	Women's sports
Baseball	Basketball
Basketball	Cross country
Cross country	Field hockey
Football	Golf
Golf	Lacrosse
Lacrosse	Soccer
Soccer	Softball
Tennis	Tennis
Track and field (indoor and outdoor)	Track and field (indoor and outdoor)
Volleyball (Note: Added in 2025-26.)	Volleyball
Wrestling	

=== Baseball ===
Shenandoah University's baseball program is coached by Kevin Anderson, who was introduced as the program’s fourth full-time coach in July 2003. In 22 seasons under Anderson, Shenandoah is 644-266-2, has won five conference tournament championships (2010, 2015, 2018, 2019, 2022) and made back-to-back NCAA Division III baseball championship appearances in 2009 and 2010.

Shenandoah has won six conference championships in program history — including four as a member of the ODAC (2015, 2018, 2019, 2022) and one each as a member of the USA South (2010) and Eastern States Athletic Conference (1991) — and four NCAA Regional titles (2009, 2010, 2019 and 2023). The Hornets have made 12 NCAA Regional appearances, two NCAA Super Regional appearances (2019, 2023) and two NCAA Division III baseball championship appearances (2009, 2010).

Shenandoah University’s baseball program plays its home games at Kevin Anderson Field at Bridgeforth Stadium, located in Jim Barnett Park in Winchester, Virginia.

==== NCAA Appearances ====
Year	Round	Opponent	Result
2009	Regional; Regional; Regional; Regional; Championship; Championship; Championship	Johns Hopkins; York (Pa.); Christopher Newport; Johns Hopkins; Farmingdale State; St. Thomas (Minn.); Carthage	W, 8-2; W, 11-2; W, 8-4; W, 11-7; W, 12-2; L, 16-5; L, 9-8
2010	Regional; Regional; Regional; Regional; Championship; Championship	Bridgewater; York (Pa.); Mary Washington; Salisbury; Illinois Wesleyan; Johns Hopkins	W, 11-1; W, 9-6; W, 10-5; W, 6-4; L, 7-5; L, 7-4
2011	Regional; Regional; Regional; Regional; Regional	Wabash; Piedmont; Piedmont; Salisbury; Salisbury	W, 4-0; W, 14-5; W, 6-1; L, 9-8; L, 8-7
2012	Regional; Regional; Regional; Regional	Rowan; Salisbury; Salisbury; Christopher Newport	W, 5-4; W, 6-1; L, 2-1; L, 9-5
2014	Regional; Regional; Regional; Regional	Covenant (Ga.); Birmingham Southern; Bridgewater; Emory	W, 11-3; W, 5-4; L, 5-3; L, 12-8
2015	Regional; Regional; Regional	Adrian; Heidelberg; Frostburg State	W, 5-1; L, 5-0; L, 7-2
2016	Regional; Regional; Regional; Regional; Regional	Marietta; Birmingham Southern; Emory; Birmingham Southern; Emory	W, 3-2; W, 6-2; L, 14-7; W, 10-8; L, 15-2
2017	Regional; Regional; Regional; Regional; Regional; Regional; Regional	Maritime (N.Y.); Wheaton, (Mass.); Lesley; Alvernia; Johns Hopkins; Wheaton (Mass.); Wheaton (Mass.)	W, 5-3; L, 6-0; W, 4-1; W, 8-6; W, 4-2; W, 5-4; L, 1-0
2018	Regional; Regional; Regional	Marietta; Wooster; Ithaca	W, 3-2; L, 13-5; L, 7-5
2019	Regional; Regional; Regional; Regional; Regional; Super Regional; Super Regional	Kean; Ithaca; Westfield State; Kean; Kean; Johns Hopkins; Johns Hopkins	L, 5-3; W, 9-2; W, 7-1; W, 6-4; W, 4-1; L, 6-3; L, 7-3
2022	Regional; Regional; Regional; Regional; Regional	St. Joseph's (Long Island); Catholic; St. Joseph's (Long Island); Catholic; Catholic	W, 10-3; L, 6-5; W, 10-8; W, 6-3; L, 13-10
2023	Regional; Regional; Regional; Regional; Regional; Super Regional; Super Regional	The College of New Jersey; Immaculata; The College of New Jersey; Christopher Newport; Christopher Newport; Lynchburg; Lynchburg	L, 22-9; W, 11-7; W, 8-1; W, 14-5; W, 5-3; L, 9-6; L, 3-1

=== Men's basketball ===
Shenandoah University’s men’s basketball program is coached by Nick Doyle, who took over the program in April 2022. The Hornets have won 10 or more games in three straight seasons for the first time since 2007-10. During the 2023-24 season, Shenandoah won 17 games and earned the program’s first national Top 25 ranking.

Shenandoah University won back-to-back Eastern States Athletic Conference championships in 1989 and 1990, and advanced to the NCAA Division III tournament in 1989.

==== NCAA Appearances ====
Year	Round	Opponent	Result
1989	First Round	Stockton	W, 74-64
1989	Regional Semifinal	Trenton State	L, 96-74
1989	Regional Consolation	Hampden-Sydney	L, 80-78

=== Women's basketball ===
Shenandoah University’s women’s basketball program is coached by Melissa Smeltzer-Kraft, who took over the program in June 2014. The Hornets have posted a winning record in six of the last seven seasons dating back to 2018-19, with the lone losing season coming in 2020-21 when Shenandoah played just 10 regular-season games. SU, which recorded 10 conference wins in a season just twice from 1988-2019, has won at least 11 ODAC games in each of the last five seasons and is 60-26 in conference play during that span.

Shenandoah won its first ODAC championship in 2019 as the eighth seed, the lowest seed ever to win an ODAC tournament title. The Hornets won their second ODAC championship in 2022, the first of three consecutive ODAC championship game appearances. Shenandoah has won four conference championships in women’s basketball — two in the ODAC and two as a member of the Dixie Conference (1996, 2000). The Hornets have made six appearances in the NCAA Tournament (1996, 2000, 2019, 2022, 2024, 2026).

Shenandoah’s women’s basketball team plays its home games in the James R. Wilkins, Jr. Athletics and Events Center.

==== NCAA Appearances ====
Year	Round	Opponent	Result
1996	First Round	Randolph-Macon	L, 91-74
2000	First Round	Roanoke	L, 69-55
2019	First Round	DeSales	L, 77-49
2022	First Round	Southern Virginia	L, 67-48
2024	First Round	Messiah	L, 58-57
2026	First Round	Trine	L, 90-45

=== Football ===
Shenandoah University’s football program is coached by Scott Yoder, who was named the Hornets’ head coach in January 2013. In 13 seasons under Yoder, Shenandoah is 72-55 overall and 43-44 in ODAC play. The Hornets are 36-16 (22-14 ODAC) since 2021 and have won eight games in three of the past four seasons. Shenandoah finished second in the ODAC in 2024 and 2025 while earning back-to-back bowl appearances in the Chesapeake Challenge, a bowl series partnership between the ODAC and the Landmark Conference.

Shenandoah was co-champion of the USA South twice, sharing the title both times with Christopher Newport in 2003 and 2004. Additionally, Shenandoah has made one appearance in the NCAA Division III Football Championship (2004), falling in the first round to Delaware Valley, 21-17.

==== NCAA Appearances ====
Year	Round	Opponent	Result
2004	First Round	Delaware Valley	L 21-17

=== Field hockey ===
Shenandoah University’s field hockey program is coached by Ashley Smeltzer-Kraft, who was appointed the third head coach in program history in February 2013. Excluding the pandemic-shortened 2020 season during which they finished 7-4, the Hornets have won 10 or more games each season since 2012. Shenandoah has posted 12 straight winning seasons since going 10-10 in Smeltzer-Kraft’s first season in 2013, and is 120-29 overall and 56-10 in ODAC play since 2018.

Shenandoah has won the ODAC tournament championship twice (2016, 2024) and has appeared in the conference championship game in three straight seasons. The Hornets have made two NCAA Division III tournament appearances and picked up their first NCAA tournament win in 2024.

==== NCAA Appearances ====
Year	Round	Opponent	Result
2016	First Round	Rochester (NY)	L, 2-0
2024	First Round	Westfield State	W, 11-0
2024	Round of 16	Messiah	L, 2-1

=== Women's lacrosse ===
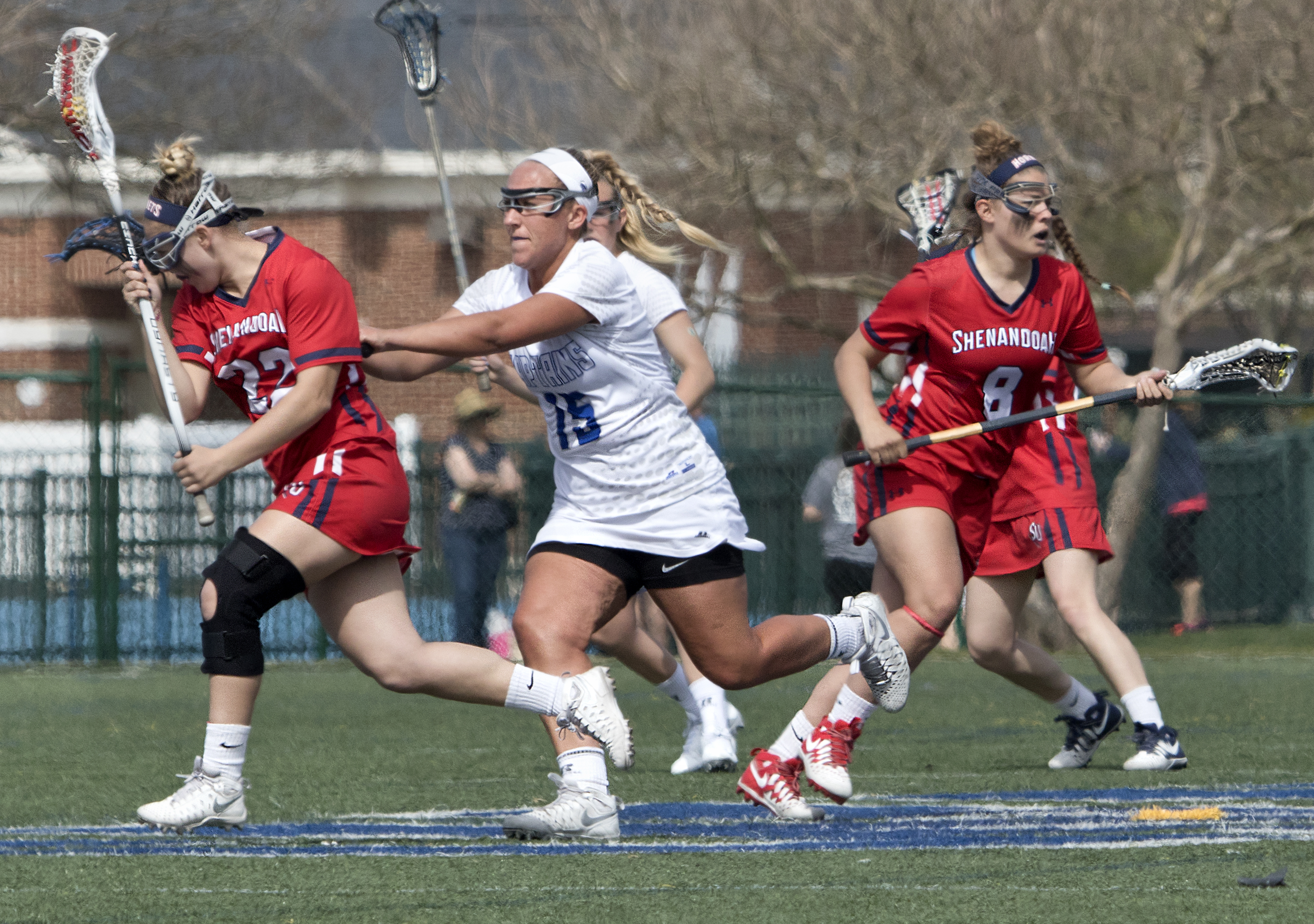
Shenandoah v CNU, women's lacrosse match in 2017

Shenandoah University’s women’s lacrosse program is coached by Lindsey Lutz, who was named the program’s fourth head coach in June 2008. Since joining the ODAC in 2013, the Hornets have posted 10 winning seasons and have finished no worse than third in the conference’s regular-season standings nine times.

Shenandoah reached the ODAC tournament championship game twice (2013, 2025), falling both times to conference powerhouse Washington and Lee. The Hornets made the NCAA Division III tournament for the first time in 2024, beating SUNY Canton, 17-9, in their debut to advance to the second round.

Shenandoah won the 2005 USA South Athletic Conference tournament for its lone conference tournament title.

==== NCAA Appearances ====
Year	Round	Opponent	Result
2024	First Round	SUNY Canton	W, 17-9
2024	Second Round	Ithaca	L, 18-6

=== Women's soccer ===
==== Championships ====
Shenandoah University’s women’s soccer program is coached by Elizabeth Pike, who took over the program in August 2007. The Hornets have posted four straight winning seasons from 2022-2025, and they went 8-2 in ODAC play in 2025, their best conference mark since going 9-1 in 2015.

Shenandoah won the USA South Athletic Conference title in 2011, its final year in the conference before moving to the ODAC in 2012. The Hornets made their lone NCAA tournament appearance in 2011, falling to Rowan in overtime, 1-0, in the first round.

==== NCAA Appearances ====
Year	Round	Opponent	Result
2011	First Round	Rowan	L, 1-0 OT

=== Softball ===
==== Championships ====
- In the spring of 2008, the women's softball team captured its first-ever USA South Athletic Conference regular-season championship in school history, finishing with a record of 30-12 (15-3 in conference).
- In the spring of 2011, the softball team won the USA South Athletic Conference Tournament Championship, the first in school history. SU defeated Christopher Newport University 4-1 and 4–2, earning an automatic bid into the NCAA Regional Tournament.

==== NCAA Appearances ====
2011
Salisbury Regional

Division	Round	Opponent	Result
Division III	First Round	Rowan	W 4-1
Division III	Second Round	Salisbury	L 0–4
Division III	Elimination Game	Kean	W 6–1
Division III	Elimination Finals	Rowan	L 1–8

== Shenandoah Hornets championships ==
=== NCAA championships ===
Sport	App.	Years
Track and field (m, indoor)	2	2023, 2024
Track and field (m, outdoor)	2	2022, 2023
Track and field (w, indoor)	5	2014, 2015, 2019, 2023, 2024
Track and field (w, outdoor)	4	2012, 2014, 2015, 2024

=== Conference championships ===
Sport	Conference	Titles	Winning years
Baseball	USA South	2	2010, 2011
Baseball	ODAC	4	2015, 2018, 2019, 2022
Basketball (m)	ESAC (Note: Eastern States Athletic Conference.)	3	1989, 1990, 1991
Basketball (m)	Dixie	1	1996
Basketball (w)	Dixie	2	1996, 2000
Basketball (w)	ODAC	2	2019, 2022
Cross country (w)	USA South	1	2010
Field hockey	ODAC	2	2016, 2024
Football	USA South	2	2003, 2004
Lacrosse (w)	USA South	1	2005
Soccer (w)	USA South	1	2011
Softball	USA South	2	2008, 2011

== Shenandoah Hornets NCAA appearances ==
Sport	App.	Years
Baseball	9	2012, 2014, 2015, 2016, 2017, 2018, 2019, 2022, 2023
Basketball (m)	3	1989, 1991, 1996
Basketball (w)	6	1996, 2000, 2019, 2022, 2024, 2026
Cross country (m)	11	2006, 2007, 2008, 2009, 2010, 2011, 2012, 2013, 2015, 2017, 2023
Cross country (w)	17	2006, 2007, 2008, 2009, 2010, 2011, 2012, 2013, 2014, 2015, 2016, 2017, 2018, 2019, 2021, 2022, 2023
Field hockey	2	2016, 2024
Football	1	2004
Lacrosse (w)	1	2024
Football	1	2004
Soccer (w)	1	2011
Softball	1	2011

=== Head coaches ===
Sport	Head coach	Tenure	Record
Baseball	Kevin Anderson	2004–present	643–266–2
Basketball (m)	Nick Doyle	2022–present	24–29
Basketball (w)	Melissa Smeltzer-Kraft	2014–present	131–128
Cross country (m/w)	Andy Marrocco	2006–present	
Field hockey	Ashley Smeltzer-Kraft	2013–present	161–66
Football	Scott Yoder	2013–present	56–49
Golf (m/w)	Scott Singhass	2006–present	
Lacrosse (m)	Tim Marshall	2014–present	75–98
Lacrosse (w)	Lindsey Lutz	2009–present	160–110
Soccer (m)	Brandon Kates	2022-present	13–11–10
Soccer (w)	Elizabeth Pike	2007–present	165–140–25
Softball	Courtney Allen	2019–present	63–101
Tennis (m)	Jason Cole	2019–present	37–34
Track and field (m/w)	Andy Marrocco	2006–present	
Volleyball	Travis Abele	2025–present	
Wrestling	Tim McGuire	2020-present	8–19

== All-America/Academic All-America List ==
Name	Year(s) Named	Sport(s)	Major(s)	Hometown
Gregg Anderson	2002	Football		
Ryan Anderson	2006	Baseball		
Courtney Beard	2007*	Field Hockey/Lacrosse	Business Administration	Manchester, Md.
Jacob Bell	2023*, 2024*	Baseball	Sport Management	Winchester, Va.
Liz Bereit	2015*	Women's Lacrosse	Sport Management	Latrobe, Pa.
Shelby Berkheimer	1997	Women's Soccer		
Catherine Beuerle	2008*, 2009*	Softball	Doctor of Physical Therapy	Lynchburg, Va.
Alyson Bittinger	2021	Women's Lacrosse	Nursing	Westminster, Md.
Kevin Brashears	2010, 2011, 2011*	Baseball	Business Administration/Kinesiology	Hagerstown, Md.
Pearce Bucher	2022*, 2023*	Baseball	Doctor of Physical Therapy	Stephens City, Va.
Ainsley Buckner	2024	Women's Lacrosse	Public Health	Springfield, Va.
Ben Burgan	2021	Football	Kinesiology	Boonsboro, Md.
Danielle Burris	2014*, 2015*	Women's Soccer	Doctor of Physical Therapy	Cooksville, Md.
William Crowder	2024	Men's Indoor T&F	Sport Management	Winchester, Va.
Phil Dixon	1996	Men's Basketball		
Chris Dooley	2006	Football		
Nick Erdman	2012*	Football	Doctor of Physical Therapy	Moseley, Va.
Deanna Estes	1998*	Women's Lacrosse	Biology	Rochelle, Va.
Kyle Feldman	2011*	Football	Doctor of Physical Therapy	Woodstock, Md.
Kiara Felston	2024	Women's Indoor T&F	Master of Business Administration	Dover, Pa.
Katie Haskins	2009*	Softball	Doctor of Physical Therapy	Montville, N.J.
Katya Hoover	2024	Women's Indoor T&F	Biology	Pen Argyl, Pa.
Gavin Horning	2023, 2023*, 2024	Baseball	Criminal Justice	Lancaster, Pa.
Caleb Hutson	2017*	Football	Sport Management	Fairfax, Va.
Mark Isabelle	2024*	Men's Lacrosse	Data Science & Applied Mathematics	Richmond, Va.
Laura Johnson	1984, 1985	Women's Basketball		
Kelsey Jones	2021, 2022	Field Hockey	Biology and Public Health	Fredericksburg, Va.
Ben Judy	2017*	Men's Lacrosse		Ellicott City, Md.
Tucker Kindig	2022, 2023	Men's Track & FIeld	Exercise Science	Spotsylvania, Va.
Stephen LaTona	2017*	Men's Lacrosse		Ellicott City, Md.
Jeremiah Lawrence	2008	Men's Basketball		
Jake Loew	2016, 2017*	Baseball	Business Administration	Binghamton, N.Y.
Colby Martin	2021, 2022, 2023	Baseball	Business Administration	Lititz, Pa.
Jack Massie	2020*	Football	Biology	Washington, Va.
Mairead McKibbin	2022, 2023	Field Hockey	Elementary Education	Magnolia, Del.
Lamont Moore	2003, 2004	Football		
Miles Moore	2023	Men's Indoor T&F	Sport Management	Richmond, Va.
Jason Morgan	2021*	Men's Lacrosse	Biology	Marlton, N.J.
Elijah Morton	2020	Men's Indoor T&F	Master of Business Administration	Culpeper, Va.
Michael Paul	2014, 2014*, 2015	Baseball	Mathematics	Red Hill, Pa.
Jake Pendergraft	2012	Baseball		Knoxville, Md.
Ricky Perez-Macia	2022	Men's Lacrosse	Biology	Fredericksburg, Va.
Willie Porter	1989	Men's Soccer		
Teddy Rogers	2007*, 2008*	Men's Lacrosse	Chemistry/Biology	Rochester, N.Y.
Jeremy Schutt	2000	Baseball		
Michael Scimanico	2016	Baseball		Dumont, N.J.
Josh Simons	2009	Baseball		Charles Town, W.Va.
Daniel Small	2019	Football	Business Administration	Atlanta, Ga.
Emma Stiffler	2023	Women's Lacrosse	Secondary Education/English	New Freedom, Pa.
Renee Summerson	2008	Women's Soccer	Doctor of Pharmacy	
Greg Van Sickler	2009, 2010, 2010*, 2011	Baseball	Business Administration	Stephenson, Va.
Elise Velasquez	2023	Field Hockey	Business Administration	Herndon, Va.
Rico Wallace	2011	Football		Hanover, Md.
Alex Wessel	2017*	Women's Soccer	Political Science/Global Studies	Severn, Md.
Shamyra Wilkerson	2019	Women's Indoor T&F	Psychology	Manquin, Va.
Geoff Williams	2000	Baseball		
Keegan Woolford	2018	Baseball	Sport Management	Charlottesville, Va.
Daniel Ziccardy	2007*	Baseball	Political Science/Spanish	Harrisonburg, Va.

*-Denotes Academic All-America

== Facilities ==
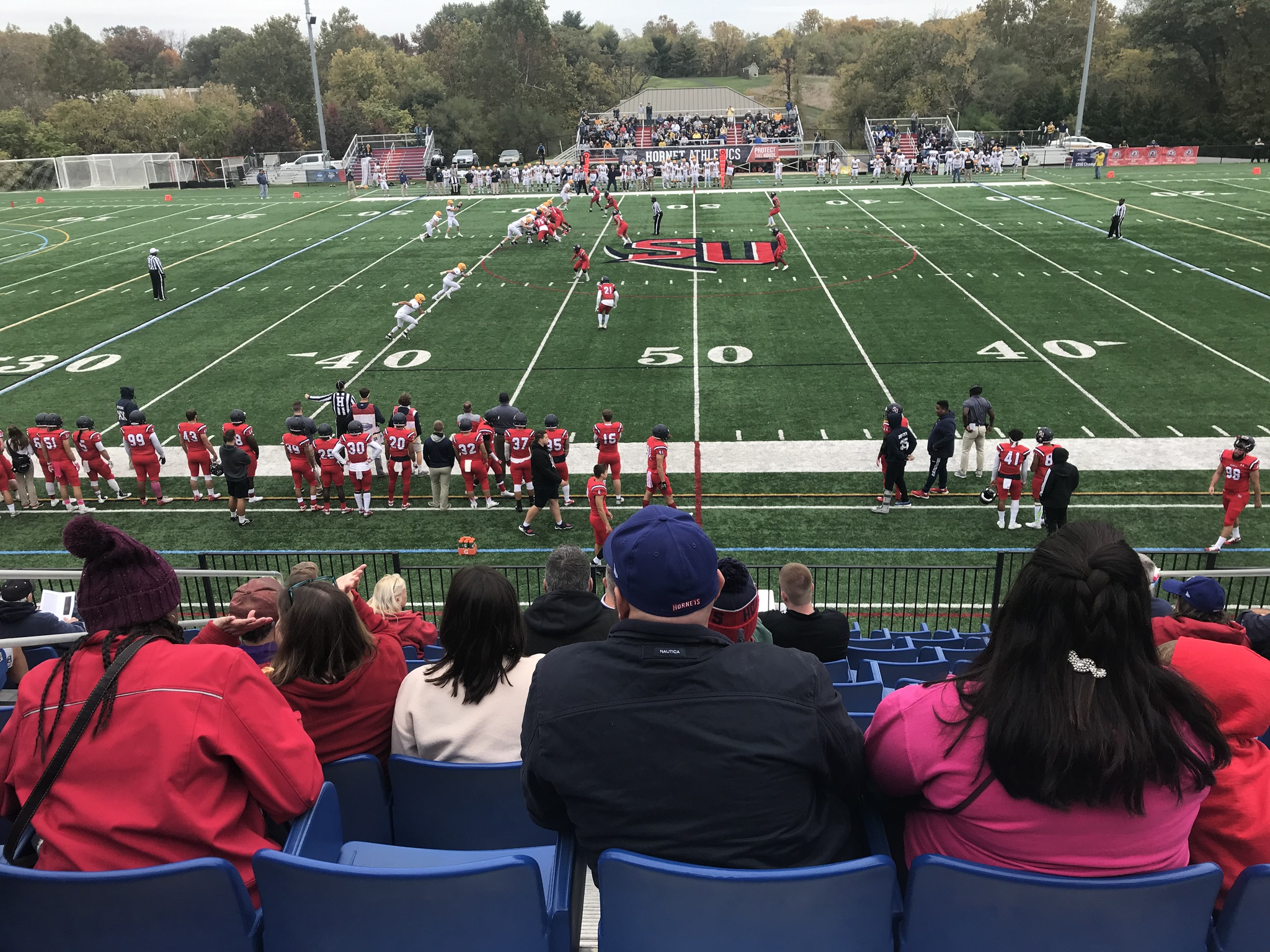
Shentel Stadium during a football game in 2019

Venue	Sport(s)	Ref.
Shentel Stadium	Football; Soccer; Lacrosse (m)	
Aikens Stadium	Lacrosse (w); Field hockey	
James R. Wilkins, Jr. Athletics & Events Center	Basketball; Volleyball; Track and field (indoor); Wrestling	
Bridgeforth Stadium	Baseball; Softball	
Lowry Courts	Tennis	
Kaye & JJ Smith Track	Recreational	
