= Maphis =

Maphis is a surname. Notable people with the surname include:

- Joe Maphis (1921–1986), American country music guitarist, husband of Rose
- Rose Lee Maphis (1922–2021), American country music singer, wife of Joe

== See also ==
- John Miley Maphis House, historic house near Edinburg, Shenandoah County, Virginia, United States
