= Edinburg Historic District =

Historic district in Virginia, United States

- U.S. National Register of Historic Places
- U.S. Historic district
- Virginia Landmarks Register
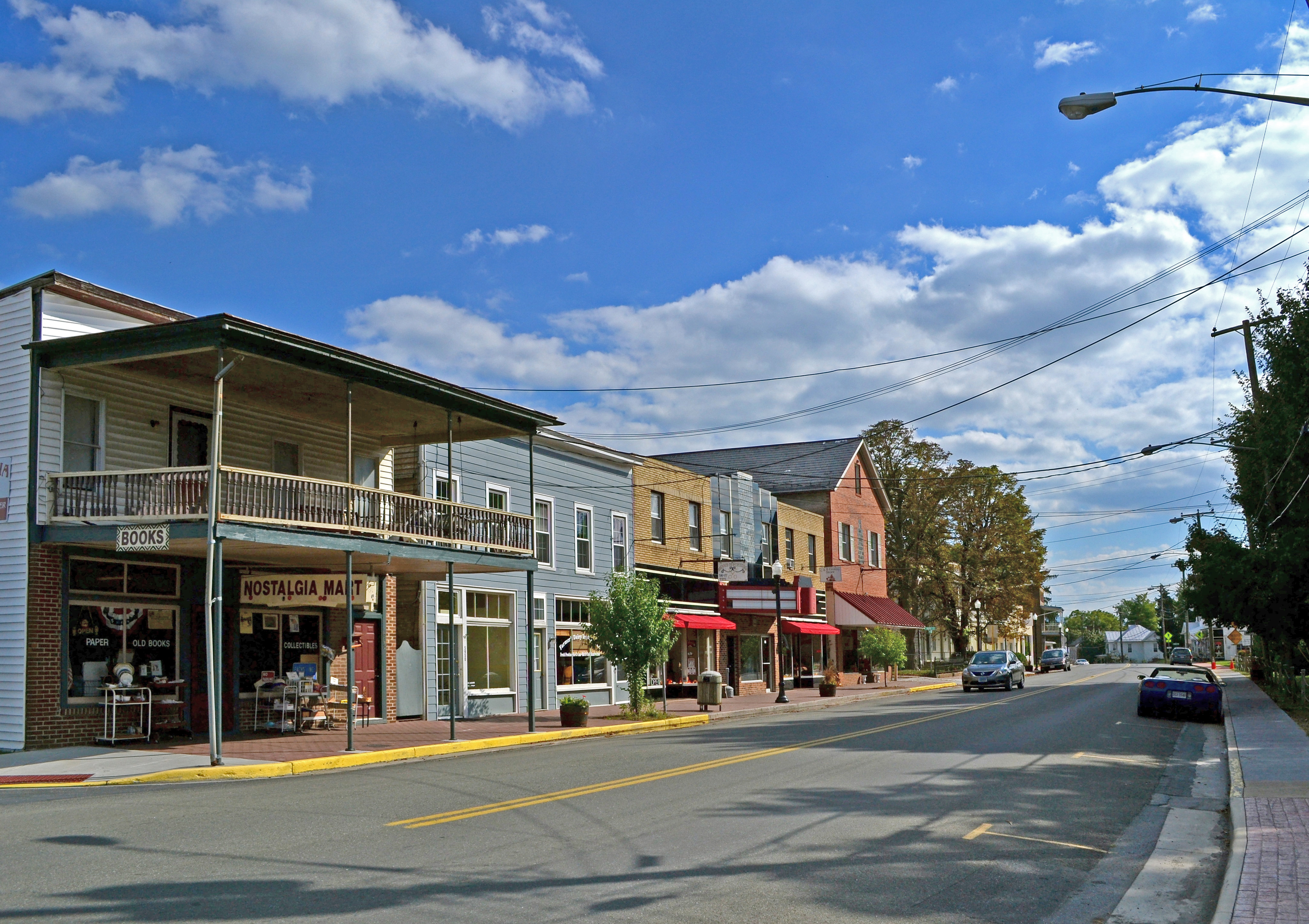
- Edinburg Historic District, September 2013

- Location within Virginia Location within the United States
- Location: Roughly along Stony Creek Blvd., Shenandoah and Railroad Aves., Edinburg, Virginia
- Coordinates: 38°49′22″N 78°33′57″W
- Area: 128 acres (52 ha)
- Built: 1787
- Architect: Multiple
- Architectural style: Colonial Revival, Italianate, Queen Anne
- NRHP reference No.: 98000845
- VLR No.: 215-0001

Significant dates
- Added to NRHP: July 22, 1998
- Designated VLR: December 3, 1997

Edinburg Historic District is a national historic district located at Edinburg, Shenandoah County, Virginia. The district encompasses 292 contributing buildings, 6 contributing sites, 3 contributing structures, and 3 contributing objects in the town of Edinburg. It includes a variety of commercial, residential, and institutional buildings dating primarily from the time of its incorporation in 1852 to the mid-20th century. They are in a variety of popular architectural styles including Colonial Revival, Italianate, and Queen Anne. Notable buildings include the Philip Grandstaff House (1787), Edinburg Hotel, St. John's United Methodist Church (1916), Edinburg High School (1932-1933), Rush House, The Hatch, Piccadilly House (1850), Pres Grandstaff House, Masonic Building (1879), Harshman House (1900), Rest Haven Inn, Edinburg Train Station, Edinburg Village Shops (1896), Wrenn Building (c. 1900), Edinburg Town Hall (1903), St. Paul's United Church of Christ (1911), and the Mantz House (1930). Located in the district is the separately listed Edinburg Mill.

It was listed on the National Register of Historic Places in 1998.
