= Dr. Christian Hockman House =

Historic house in Virginia, United States

- U.S. National Register of Historic Places
- Virginia Landmarks Register
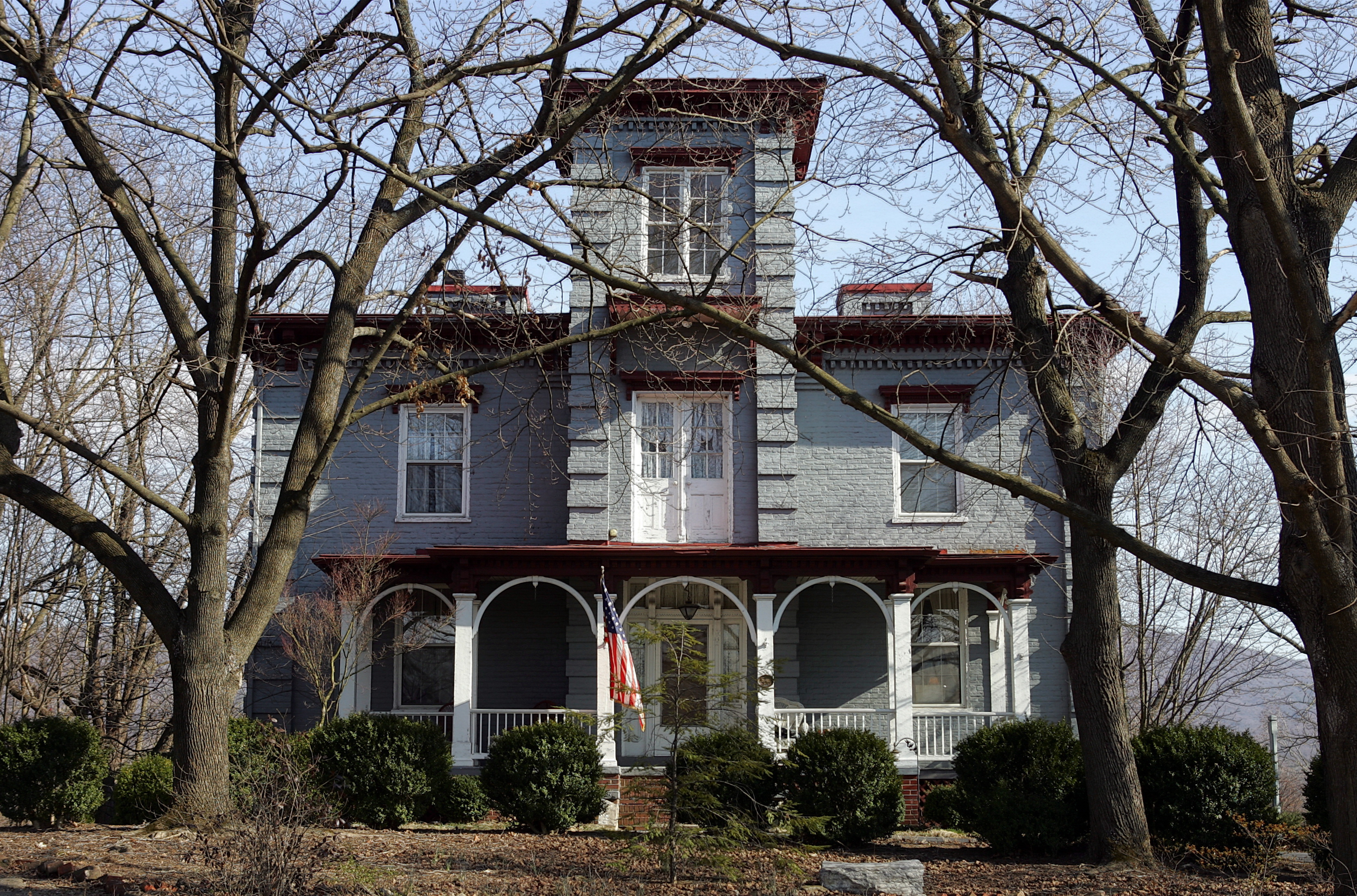

- Location within Virginia Location within the United States
- Location: US 11, near Edinburg, Virginia
- Coordinates: 38°49′45″N 78°33′4″W
- Area: 6.6 acres (2.7 ha)
- Built: 1868
- Architectural style: Italian Villa
- NRHP reference No.: 84003593
- VLR No.: 085-0076

Significant dates
- Added to NRHP: February 23, 1984
- Designated VLR: November 17, 1984

Dr. Christian Hockman House, also known as Chequers, is a historic home located near Edinburg, Shenandoah County, Virginia. It was built in 1868, and is a two-story three bay square, Italian Villa style brick dwelling. It features a prominent square central tower; wide, bracketed cornices, embellished with decorative scroll-sawn friezes; and an elaborately detailed front verandah.

It was listed on the National Register of Historic Places in 1984.
