= Campbell Farm (Edinburg, Virginia) =

Historic house in Virginia, United States

- U.S. National Register of Historic Places
- Virginia Landmarks Register
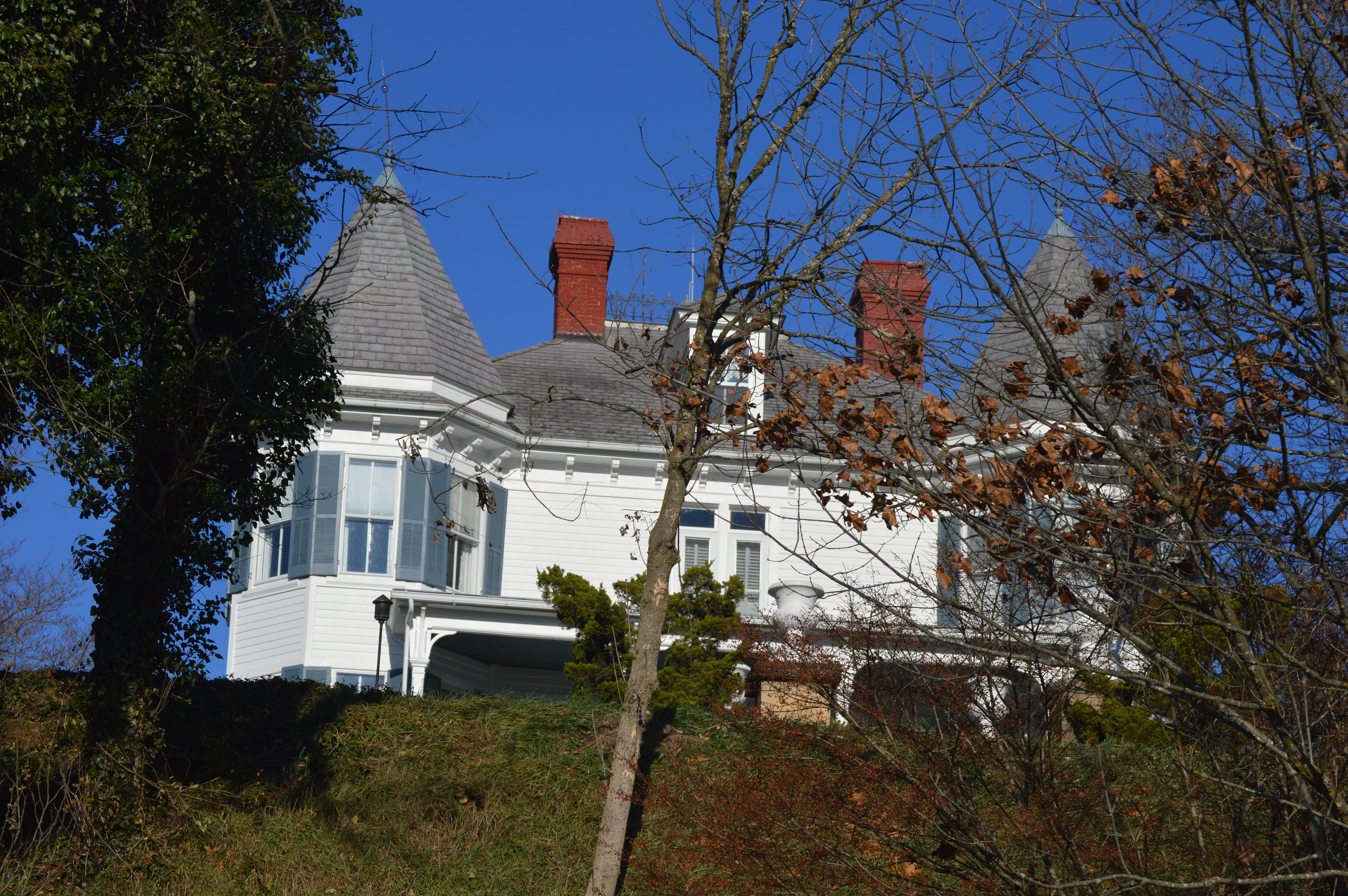
- Front of the farmhouse

- Location within Virginia Location within the United States
- Location: VA 675, near Lantz Mills, near Edinburg, Virginia
- Coordinates: 38°50′33″N 78°35′28″W
- Area: 89 acres (36 ha)
- Built: 1888-1889
- Architectural style: Queen Anne
- NRHP reference No.: 90001416
- VLR No.: 085-0127

Significant dates
- Added to NRHP: August 15, 1990
- Designated VLR: April 17, 1990

Campbell Farm, also known as Hite Farm, is a historic home and farm located near Edinburg, Shenandoah County, Virginia. The house was built in 1888–1889, and is a 2 1/2-story, three-bay, Queen Anne style frame dwelling. It features corner turrets, a hipped roof with patterned slate shingles, and a front porch with a sawnwork balustrade. The property includes a number of contributing outbuildings including a wash house / kitchen, two-room privy, a barn, a machine shed, and a corn crib.

It was listed on the National Register of Historic Places in 1990.
