= Edinburg Mill =

- U.S. National Register of Historic Places
- U.S. Historic district – Contributing property
- Virginia Landmarks Register
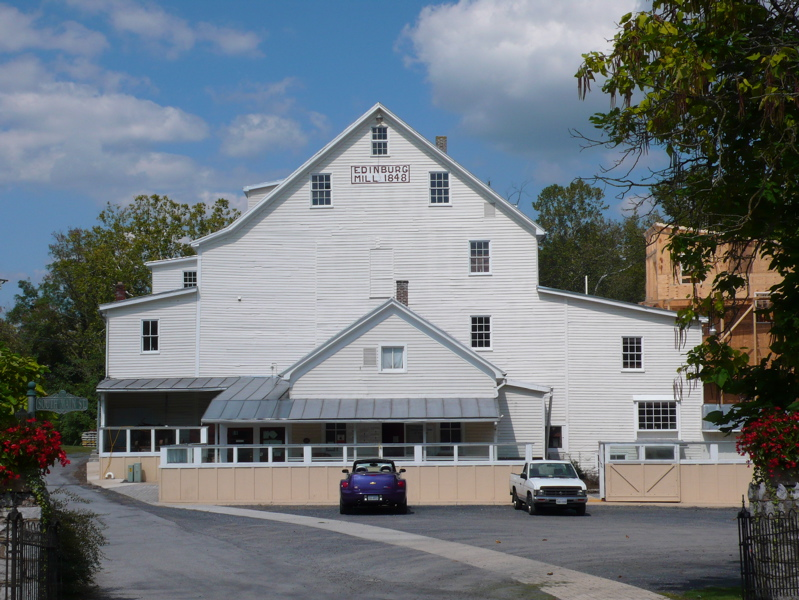

- Location within Virginia Location within the United States
- Location: U.S. 11, Edinburg, Virginia
- Coordinates: 38°49′14″N 78°34′6″W
- Area: 1 acre (0.40 ha)
- Built: 1848
- NRHP reference No.: 79003084
- VLR No.: 085-0110

Significant dates
- Added to NRHP: September 7, 1979
- Designated VLR: June 19, 1979

Edinburg Mill is a grist mill in Edinburg, Virginia. The three-story wood-framed building stands on Stony Creek, set on a limestone basement. A working mill until 1978, the original structure was built in 1848 by the Grandstaff family. It replaced an 1813 complex developed by Grandstaff that included a sawmill, grist mill and a carding operation. The present mill was almost burned during the American Civil War, when forces under Union general Philip Sheridan set fire to the mill as part of their scorched-earth campaign. Local women convinced the soldiers to salvage the mill's flour, and the fire was extinguished, saving the mill.

The mill is three stories tall with a prominent gable formed by the deep roof structure. Shed-roofed extensions are found to either side of the gable, with a lean-to office addition at the front gable end. Although built in the 19th century, the mill uses some 18th-century techniques, such as shoulder posts.

Edinburg Mill is owned by the town of Edinburg in partnership with a preservation group. It was placed on the National Register of Historic Places on September 7, 1979. It is included in the Edinburg Historic District.
