= James R. Wilkins Sr. =

James R. Wilkins
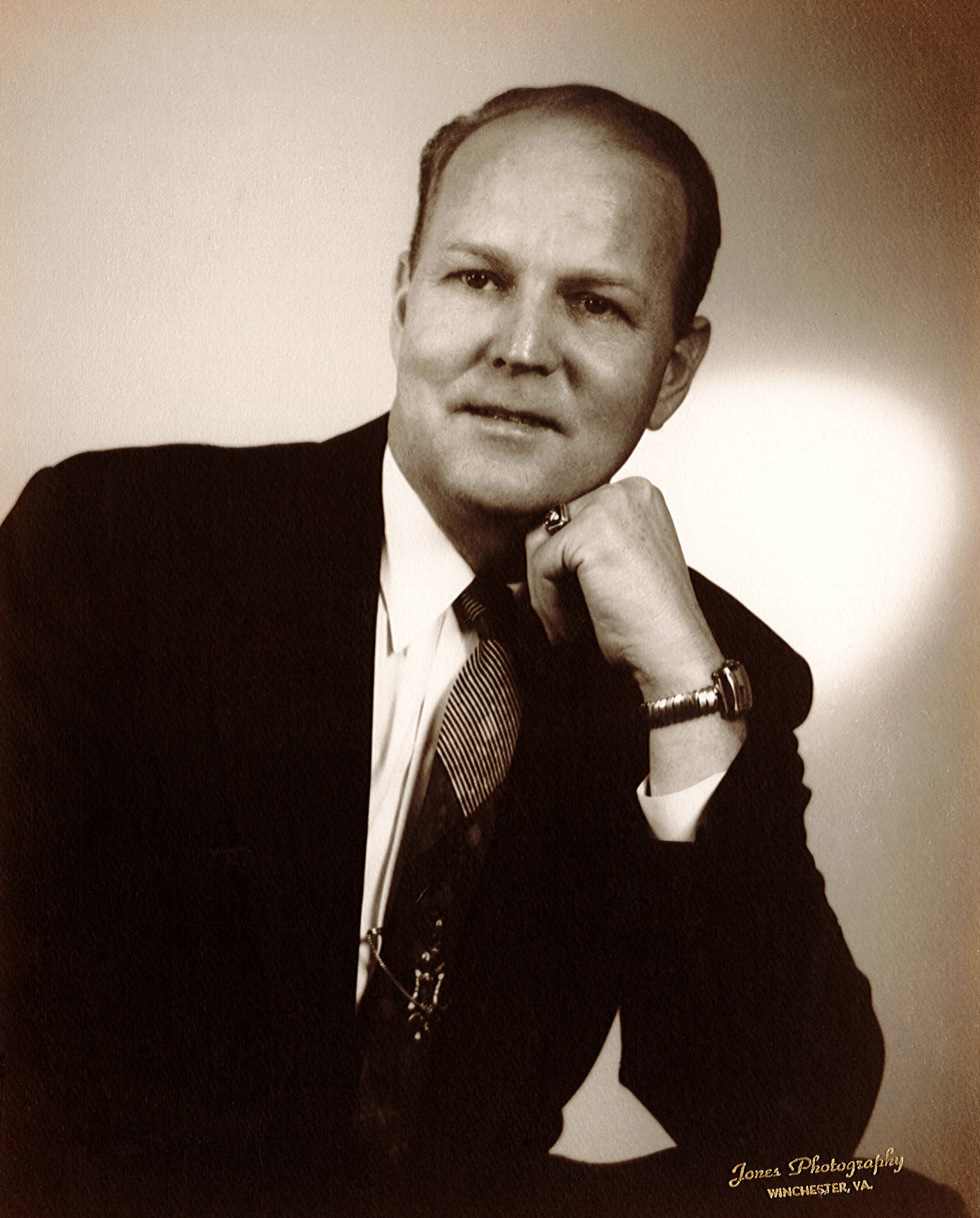
- Born: July 16, 1910; Virgilina, Virginia
- Died: September 13, 1996 (aged 86); Winchester, Virginia
- Education: Ferrum College; George Washington University
- Occupations: Entrepreneur and Philanthropist
- Spouse: Mary B. O'Brien (M. 1944)
- Children: James R. Wilkins Jr.
- Honours: Algernon Sydney Sullivan Award (1979); Honorary Doctorate of Humanities, Shenandoah University (1993); "Citizen of the Year" Winchester-Frederick County Chamber of Commerce (1956)

James R. Wilkins (July 16, 1910 – September 13, 1996) was an American retailer, developer, community leader, and philanthropist in and around Winchester, in the northern Shenandoah Valley of Virginia. He is best known for his instrumental role in relocating Shenandoah College & Conservatory of Music, now known as Shenandoah University, to Winchester in 1960.

== Early life ==
Wilkins was born with humble beginnings in Virgilina, Virginia, one of four sons and one sister. His father, was foreman for a local construction company.

Wilkins left high school at age 16 in 1926 and went to California, where he found work in the oil fields. A year later, he returned home, completed high school, and later attended Hampden-Sydney College before taking a construction job to help pay his older brother’s tuition at the same institution.

=== Civilian Conservation Corps ===
The onset of the Great Depression caused Wilkins’ construction job to disappear and he found work with the Federal Forest Service, now the National Park Service. In April 1933 he became superintendent of Camp Roosevelt in Edinburg, Virginia the first Civilian Conservation Corps' (CCC) camp. When the camps began offering night classes, Wilkins began teaching courses in surveying, wildlife management, and literacy.

== Career ==
=== World War II ===
The advent of World War II caused the CCC camps to close. Wilkins went off to Army officer candidate school, emerging as a second lieutenant and continued his education at George Washington University's School of Engineering, in Washington D.C., where he completed 90 hours of work in building construction and supervision. In 1944, before his deployment to Nigeria and Sudan, Wilkins married Mary B. O'Brien. During the war, he aided in the construction of landing strips for the Army Air Corps, retiring with the rank of major in 1947.

=== Rebuilding his business ===
Wilkins began his entrepreneurial journey in the shoe business while serving in the Civilian Conservation Corps (CCC), investing in two shoe stores in Central Virginia. Following his military service, his stores had been depleted of inventory due to wartime rationing. Wilkins returned east with his wife and newborn son, James R. Wilkins Jr. He stopped at the International Shoe Company in Saint Louis and other vendors in New York City. With his stores restocked, Wilkins expanded his ShoeCenter chain into Front Royal and Winchester, Virginia, where he settled with his family and welcomed their daughter, Donna Lee, in 1949.

== Community involvement ==
With the success of his Winchester store, Wilkins turned his attention to development and community service and was active until his death in the Chamber of Commerce, Lion’s Club, Virginia Retail Merchants, and the Shenandoah Apple Blossom Festival.

In 1952, he began work on Winchester's first industrial park. With a few friends purchased a large parcel of land just south of Winchester and laid underground utilities. Wilkins worked with the city to secure water for the facilities. These parks attracted clean industries, enhanced economic opportunities for local residents, and drew young, talented individuals to the area.

=== Moving a college to Winchester ===
In 1955, Wilkins, now president of the local Chamber of Commerce, spearheaded efforts to bring a college to Winchester. His task force identified Shenandoah College and Conservatory of Music, a struggling institution in Dayton, Virginia. On February 6th, 1958 ground was broken for the first two buildings on the Winchester campus and in September of 1960 the first classes began.

For the next 22 years, Wilkins played a pivotal role in Shenandoah's development, and often paying the bills to ensure Shenandoah's financial stability. In 1982, while accepting an award at Ferrum College, Wilkins met Dr. James A. Davis and convinced him to take on the role as president of Shenandoah College. Under Davis's leadership, the school prospered, and Wilkins was able to step back from daily involvement.

The college is now a university with over 4,300 students offering undergraduate, graduate, and doctoral degrees. The university is known for its programs in the health sciences, with 60% of students majoring in health professions such as pharmacy, physical therapy, and physician assistant studies. Additionally, Shenandoah has an athletics program with 22 Division III teams and a conservatory that produces graduates who go on to work on Broadway and perform throughout the world.

== Legacy ==
In 1994, two years before his death, Wilkins placed his entire personal estate into a charitable foundation to be overseen by his children and grandchildren as trustees. Among the non-profits and charities the James R. Wilkins Charitable Trust proudly supports.

- Shenandoah University
- Ferrum College
- State Arboretum of Virginia
- Shenandoah Battlefields Foundation
- The James R. Wilkins Civil Conservation Corps Interpretive Center
- The Winchester Educational Foundation
- Shenandoah Apple Blossom Festival
- Winchester Medical Center Foundation

And many more.
