= Clem–Kagey Farm =

Historic house in Virginia, United States

- U.S. National Register of Historic Places
- Virginia Landmarks Register
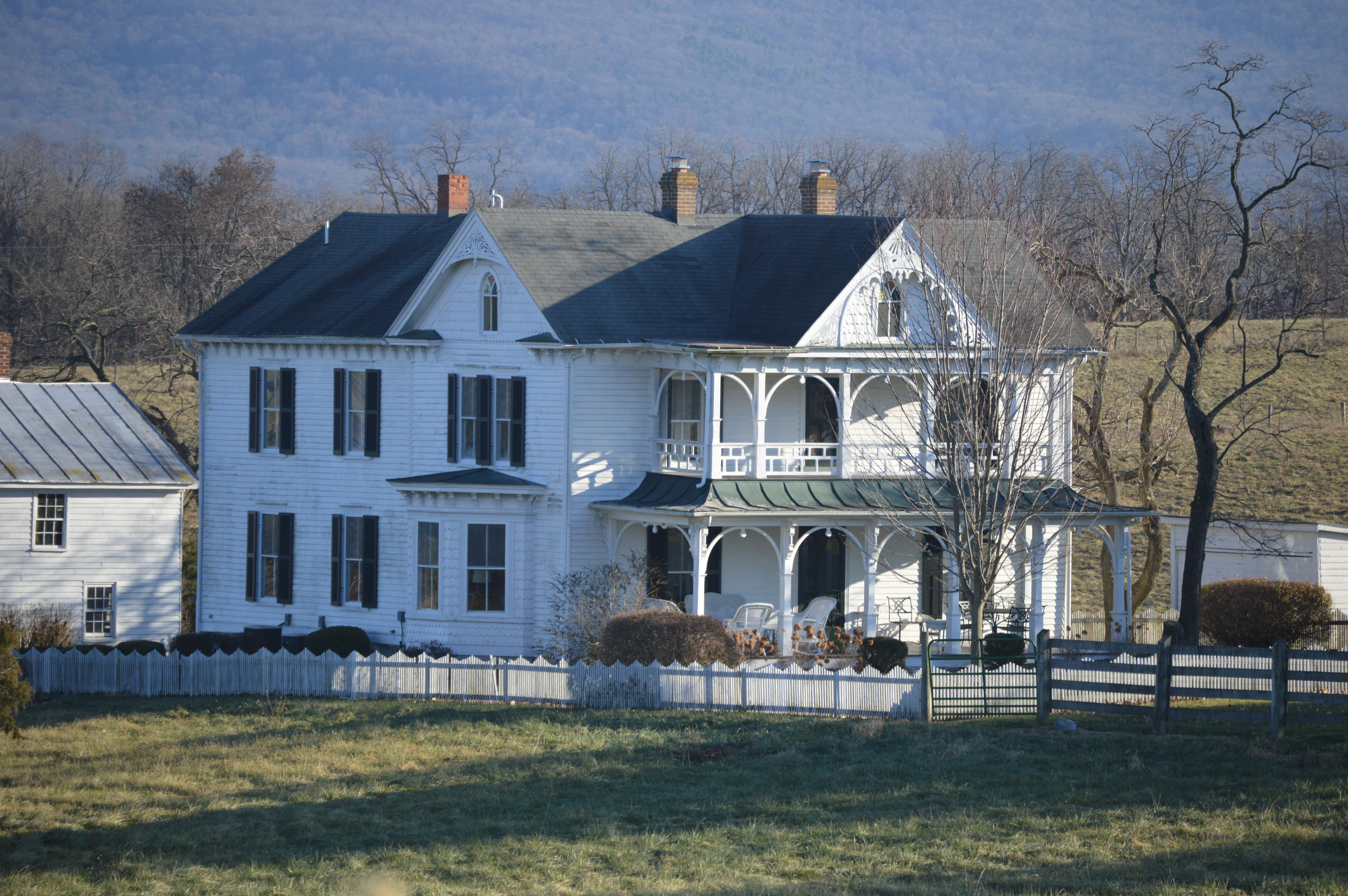
- Front and western side of the farmhouse

- Location within Virginia Location within the United States
- Location: 291 Belgravia Rd., near Edinburg, Virginia
- Coordinates: 38°47′43″N 78°37′22″W
- Area: 110 acres (45 ha)
- Built: 1880
- Built by: Jones, R.S.
- Architectural style: Italianate, I house
- NRHP reference No.: 09000643
- VLR No.: 085-0206

Significant dates
- Added to NRHP: August 20, 2009
- Designated VLR: June 18, 2009

Clem–Kagey Farm, also known as the Hiram C. Clem House and Kagey House, is a historic home and farm located near Edinburg, Shenandoah County, Virginia. The farmhouse was built in 1880, and is a two-story, five-bay, frame I-house dwelling with an integral rear wing. It features a full-width, two-story Italianate style ornamented front porch and two brick interior chimneys. Also on the property are the contributing frame garage (c. 1920), the two-story frame wagon shed/shop building (c. 1880), and granary (c. 1880).

It was listed on the National Register of Historic Places in 2009.
