= Bowman–Zirkle Farm =

Historic house in Virginia, United States

- U.S. National Register of Historic Places
- U.S. Historic district
- Virginia Landmarks Register
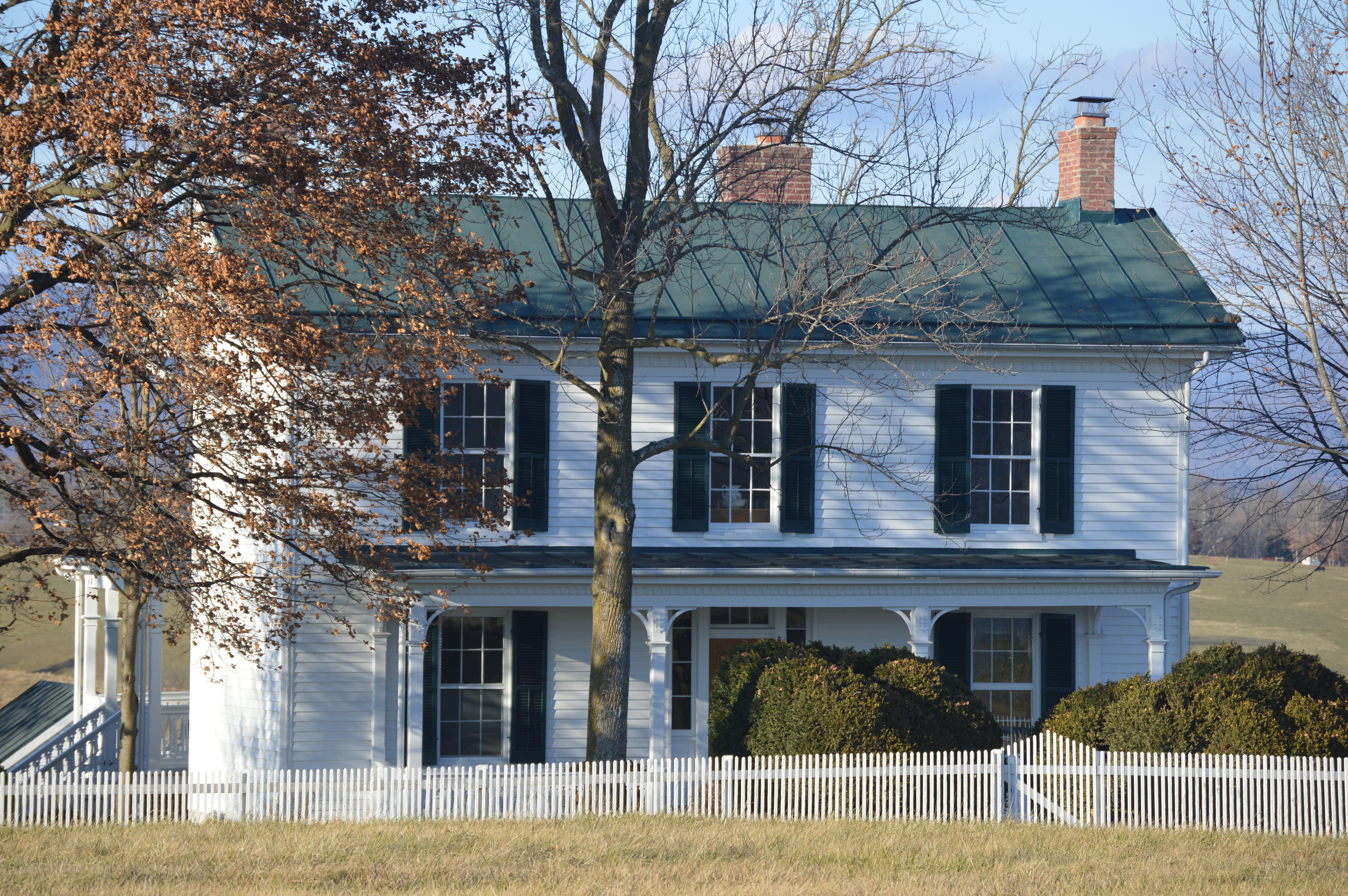
- Front of the farmhouse

- Location within Virginia Location within the United States
- Location: 12097 S. Middle Rd., near Edinburg, Virginia
- Coordinates: 38°47′56″N 78°37′33″W
- Area: 285.9 acres (115.7 ha)
- Built: 1823, 1879
- Architectural style: Late Victorian, I house
- NRHP reference No.: 09000642
- VLR No.: 085-0438

Significant dates
- Added to NRHP: August 21, 2009
- Designated VLR: June 18, 2009

Bowman–Zirkle Farm, also known as the Isaiah Bowman Farm, is a historic home and farm and national historic district located near Edinburg, Shenandoah County, Virginia. The district encompasses seven contributing buildings and three contributing structures. The farmhouse was built in 1879, and is a two-story, three-bay, frame I-house dwelling with an integral wing. The remaining contributing resources are a 19th-century log-and-frame tenant house, a summer kitchen (c. 1823), frame meat house (c. 1880), a large bank barn (the Bowman barn, c. 1870); a barn shed, a second bank barn (the Painter barn, c. 1880), a frame granary (c. 1880), a wood-stave silo (c. 1900), and a large, two-story chicken house (c. 1920).

It was listed on the National Register of Historic Places in 2009.
