= Shenandoah University =

Private university in Winchester, Virginia, US

- Former names: Shenandoah Seminary (1875–1925) Shenandoah College and Conservatory of Music (1925–1991) Shenandoah Conservatory (separate institution 1937–1974)
- Motto: The Big Little University Rising
- Type: Private
- Established: 1875; 151 years ago
- Religious affiliation: United Methodist Church
- Endowment: $89.1 million (2025)
- President: Tracy Fitzsimmons
- Students: 4,488 students (fall 2025)
- Undergraduates: 2,723 (fall 2025)
- Postgraduates: 1,765 (fall 2025)
- Doctoral students: 656 doctoral degrees conferred in 2024-2025 academic year
- Location: Winchester, Virginia, United States; 39.166°N 78.158°W
- Campus: Small city
- Colors: Red and blue
- Nickname: Hornets
- Sporting affiliations: NCAA Division III
- Website: su.edu

- Location in Shenandoah Valley Location in Virginia Location in United States

Shenandoah University is a private university in Winchester, Virginia, United States. It has an enrollment of approximately 4,000 students across more than 200 areas of study in six schools and colleges. Shenandoah University is one of five United Methodist Church-affiliated institutions of higher education in the Commonwealth of Virginia.

== History ==
=== Founding and early history ===
Abram Paul Funkhouser and John (Jay) Paul Fries founded the school as Dayton High School on February 12, 1875. At the time, it was located on a 10-acre (4.0 ha) campus in Dayton, Virginia, and classes were initially held in a two-room log cabin. The school had 11 students enrolled in its first year. In 1877, the high school became Shenandoah Seminary, and from that point forward, the institution changed names six times but always kept “Shenandoah” as part of its name.

Shenandoah Seminary became a junior college in 1924, changing its name to Shenandoah College the following year. Shenandoah Conservatory became a separate corporation in 1937 and began granting four-year degrees.

=== Move to Winchester ===
Intense competition from neighboring colleges and universities, along with increasing long-term operating deficits, created low morale. The college urgently required a solution to prevent its closure. On June 2, 1952, President L. P. Hill resigned, effective immediately. Eight days later Reverend Troy Brady was elected as president by the Evangelical United Brethren (EUB)

President Brady implemented various strategies such as student recruitment, expanding course options, fundraising, and slashing unnecessary expenses. Despite these efforts, the enrollment continued to decline and the possibility of closure was imminent.

In a desperate move, Troy reached out to Washington and arranged a meeting with Democratic Senator Harry F. Byrd at his office in Washington, D.C. Byrd recommended that Troy contact his son in Winchester, who ran The Winchester Star Newspaper.

Troy was then directed to the Winchester Chamber of Commerce, where he met with committee president and prominent local business leader, James R. Wilkins Sr. James assisted Troy in the endeavor of relocating the school to Winchester. He regularly participated in board meetings with Brady to engage with EUB members. Through Wilkins' efforts he secured a plot of land from Winchester's Jim Barnett Park for the college, where the main campus is currently located.

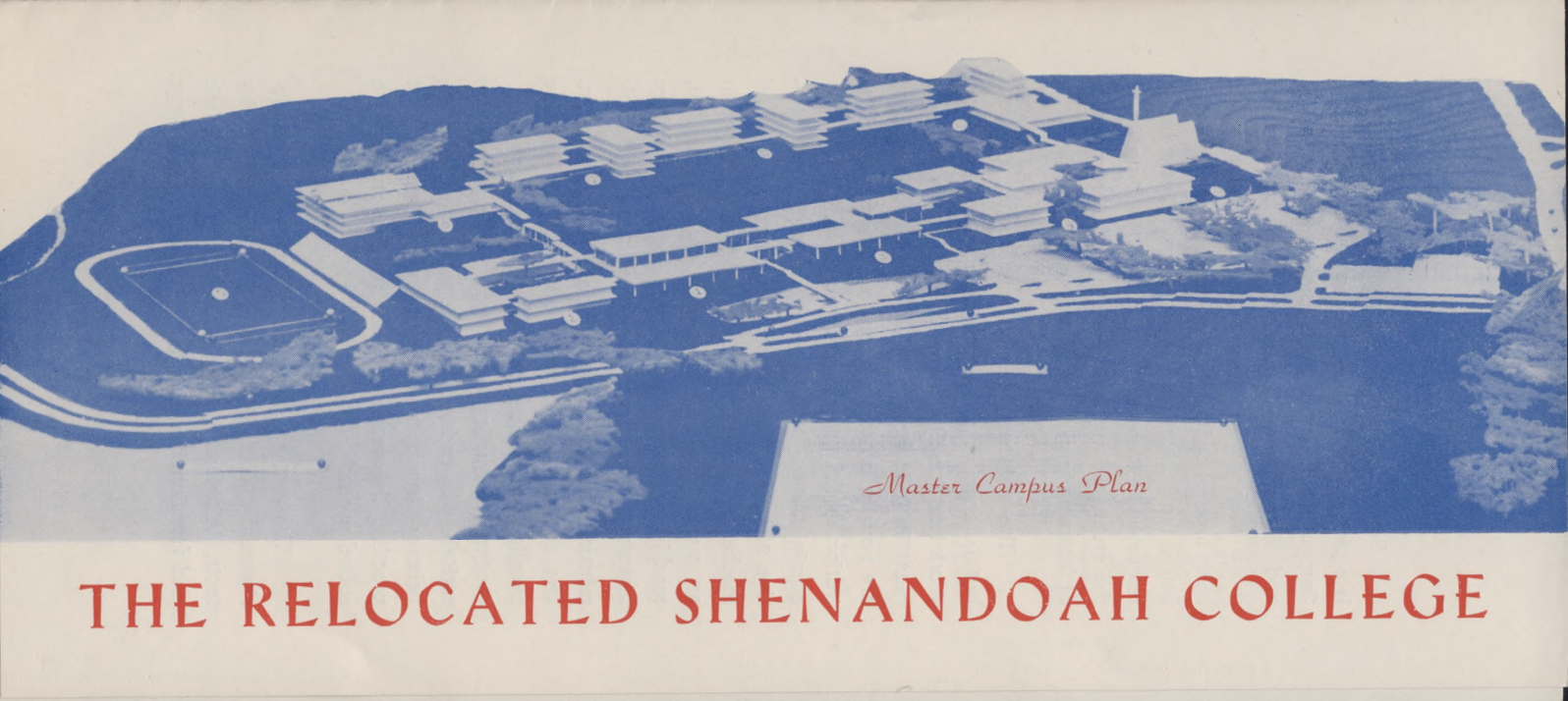
Master campus plan of 1957

On June 28, 1956, the EUB approved the school's move to Winchester. Two days later, Brady resigned, and Dr. Forrest Racey, Class of 1923, took over as president. Continuing Brady's work with the City of Winchester.

On May 17th, 1959 Shenandoah College auctioned off its Dayton campus for $107,875 and construction began on the new campus on February 6th, 1958—opening in Winchester in September 1960, with two academic buildings, Gregory and Armstrong Halls.

Shenandoah began offering four-year degrees in 1974 (at which time the college and conservatory corporations were merged).

Shenandoah obtained university status on January 1, 1991. The university, as of fall 2023, had 265 full-time and 189 part-time faculty members. The student body represented 42 foreign countries as well as 48 states plus the District of Columbia, Puerto Rico, and Guam. Over 70 percent of full-time faculty had a doctorate in their fields or other terminal degree.

== Name ==
According to the university's official history, the name Shenandoah is derived from the Native American legend of Zynodoa, a brave warrior whose life of strength and courage and his appreciation of beauty resulted in having a river and a valley named for him. Popular myth further ascribes translation of the word "Shenandoah" to mean "daughter of the stars".

== Locations ==
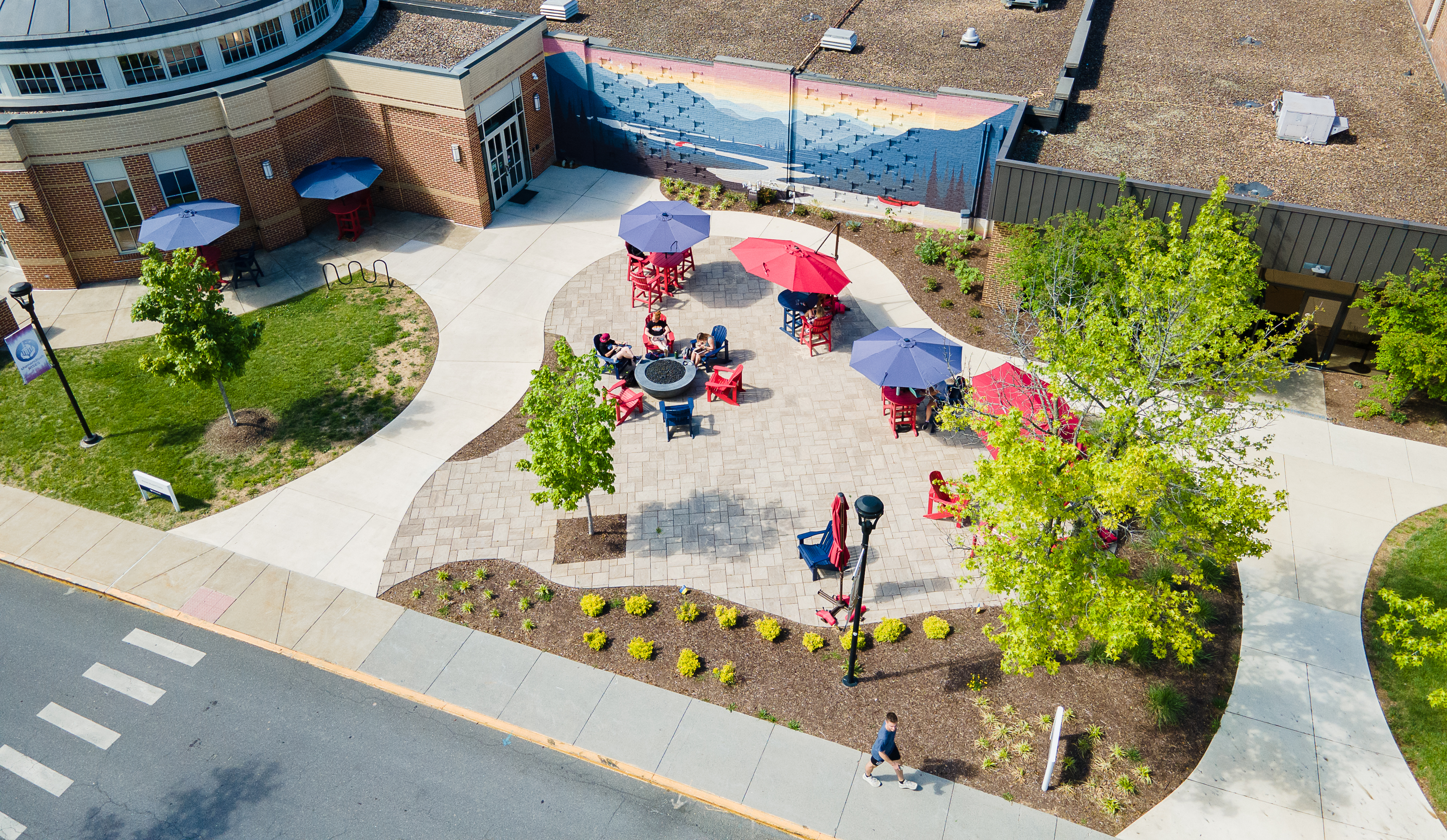
The front patio of the Brandt Student Center

The university operates in five locations:

- Winchester
- Loudoun
- Downtown Winchester
- Health Professions Building on the campus of Winchester Medical Center
- Shenandoah River Campus at Cool Spring Battlefield

The main location of campus is in Winchester near Interstate 81, and the Health Professions Building is located near the Winchester Medical Center. The Loudoun site in Ashburn, Virginia, is home to graduate programs in business, education, leadership studies, occupational therapy, physical therapy, and physician assistant studies, as well as the accelerated-second-degree Bachelor of Science in Nursing program. There are also satellite offices and facilities located throughout Winchester.

In 2013, Shenandoah University accepted stewardship of 195 acres of land along the Shenandoah River, now known as the Shenandoah River Campus at Cool Spring Battlefield. Purchased by the Civil War Trust in 2012, stewardship of the property transferred to the university in spring 2013 to protect and preserve the former battlefield site. The property now serves as an outdoor classroom and living laboratory for the university community and the general public.

== Academics ==
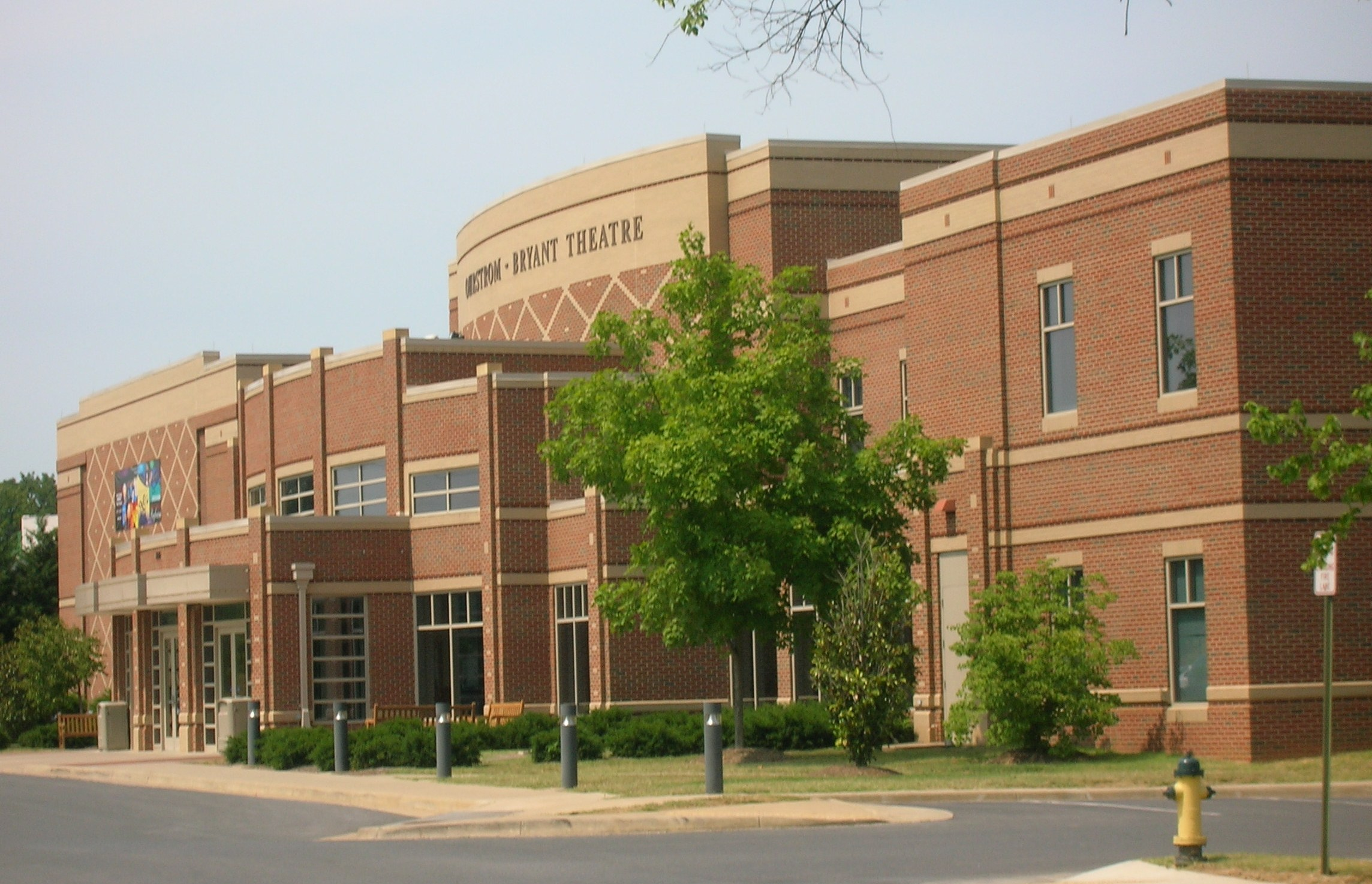
The Ohrstrom-Bryant Theatre (Winchester location), 1998

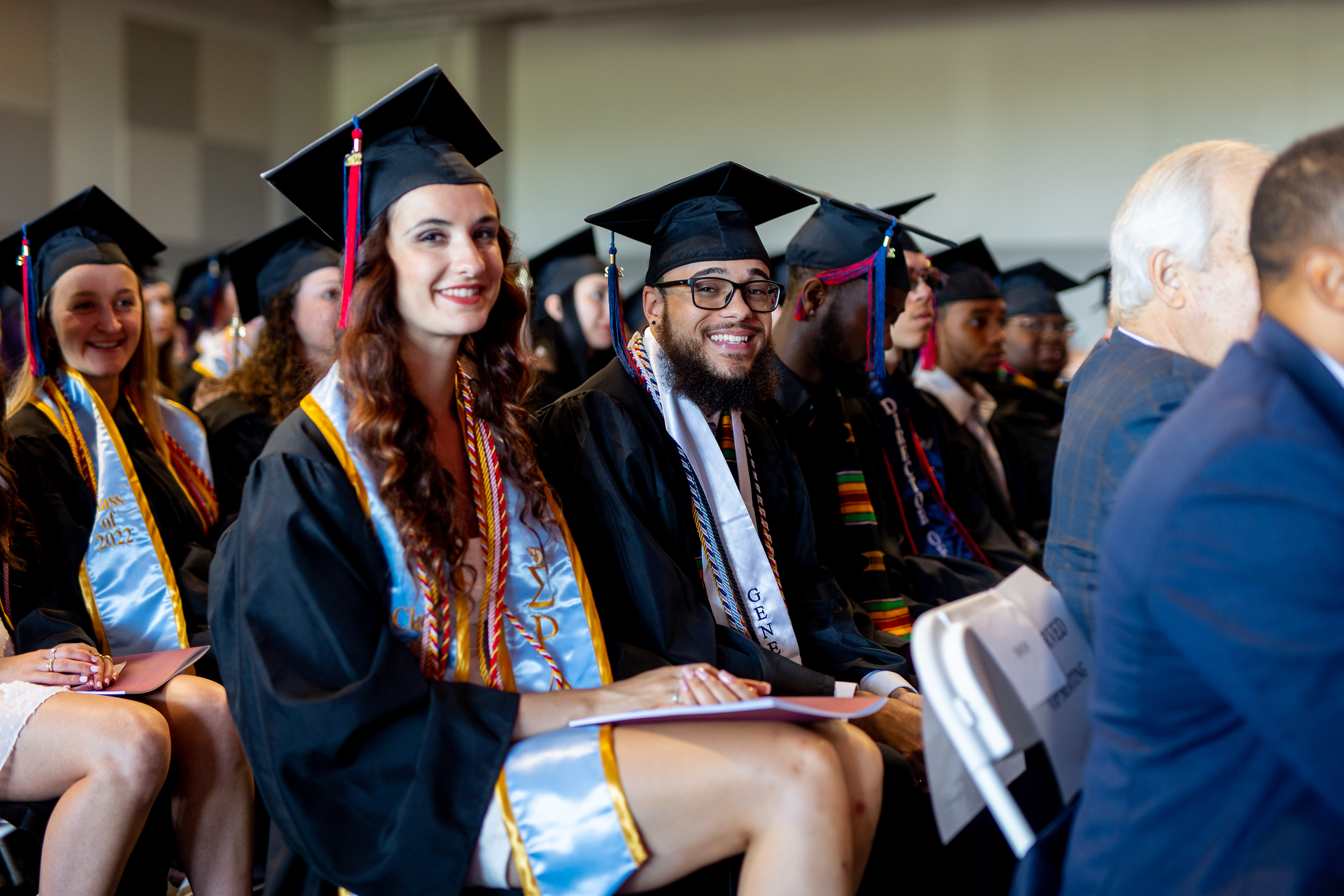
Graduates at commencement in 2022

Shenandoah offers more than 200 areas of study at the bachelor's, master's, and doctoral-degree levels, as well as through undergraduate and graduate certificates, across six schools. Its programming includes Virginia's first bachelor's degrees in virtual reality design and esports management, as well as the state's oldest music therapy program (offered at the undergraduate and graduate levels).

- College of Arts & Sciences
- College of Business, Engineering & Technology (encompassing the School of Business, as well as the School of Engineering & Technology)
- Shenandoah Conservatory
- Bernard J. Dunn School of Pharmacy
- Eleanor Wade Custer School of Nursing
- School of Health Professions

Shenandoah University no longer offers a tenure track for new faculty members. Instead, new faculty members undergo a 5-year probationary period, after which they are eligible for 3-year, renewable "career faculty contracts".

Shenandoah President Tracy Fitzsimmons, Ph.D., who began her presidential tenure on July 1, 2008, is the longest-serving president among current leaders of Virginia colleges and universities.

== Athletics ==
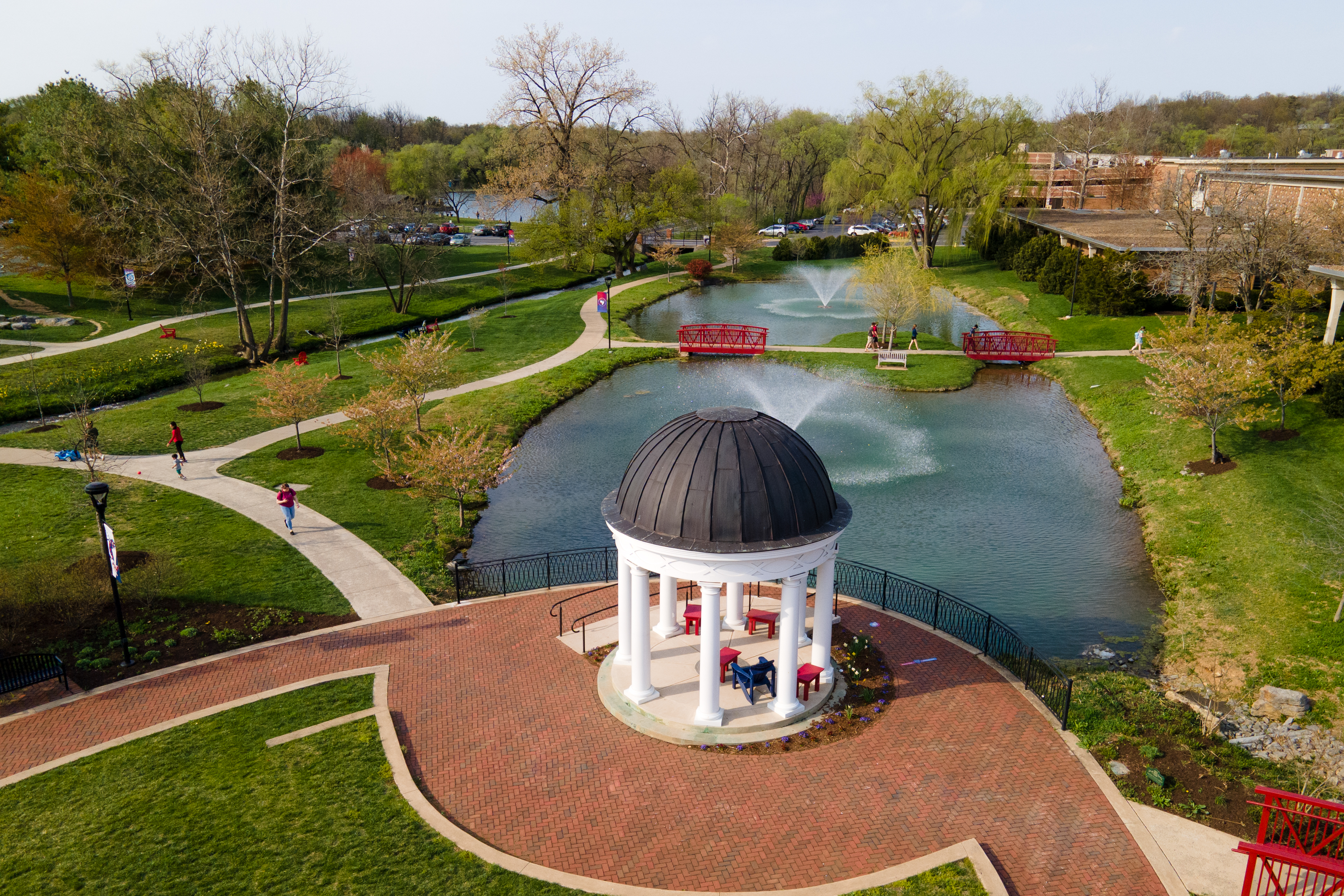
Sarah's Glen where students can relax and study on campus

The Shenandoah athletic teams are called the Hornets. The university is a member of the NCAA Division III ranks, primarily competing in the Old Dominion Athletic Conference (ODAC) since the 2012–13 academic year. The Hornets previously competed in the USA South Athletic Conference (USA South) from 1992–93 to 2011–12.

Shenandoah competes in 23 intercollegiate varsity sports: Men's sports include baseball, basketball, cross country, football, golf, lacrosse, soccer, tennis, track & field (indoor and outdoor), volleyball, and wrestling; while women's sports include basketball, cross country, field hockey, golf, lacrosse, soccer, softball, tennis, track & field (indoor and outdoor) and volleyball.

The university's band debuted during the fall 2022 semester.

In fall 2023, football safety Haley Van Voorhis became one of the first women to play a position other than kicker in an NCAA football game, at any level.

=== James R. Wilkins, Jr. Athletic and Events Center ===
The James R. Wilkins, Jr. Athletic and Events Center is a 77,000-square-foot facility located on the main campus. Opened in 2017, the center serves as the primary venue for university athletics, large-scale events, and community functions. It features a multipurpose arena with seating for over 1,600 spectators, an indoor track, basketball and volleyball courts, and dedicated training facilities for student-athletes. In addition to athletic spaces, the facility includes classrooms, meeting rooms, and fitness amenities. The center was named in recognition of James R. Wilkins Jr.’s contributions to Shenandoah University and the surrounding community, reflecting his commitment to education, sports, and philanthropy.

==== Mass Vaccination Clinic ====
The facility stood as a crucial frontline in the battle against COVID-19, serving as a mass vaccination site for the Shenandoah Valley and Northern Virginia. From January 12th to May 6th, 2021, the James R. Wilkins Athletic and Events Center witnessed the dedication of over 1,000 SU volunteers. Together with Valley Health and the Lord Fairfax Health District, Shenandoah University emerged as a pivotal force in Virginia's vaccination campaign, serving an essential role in the ongoing fight against the pandemic.

Operating for 12 hours each day, the center administered between 1,200 to 1,500 COVID-19 vaccine doses daily. Offering the Johnson & Johnson, Moderna, and Pfizer vaccines, the clinic delivered a remarkable total of 70,589 shots.

== Notable alumni ==
- Alan Baylock, jazz composer, bandleader and arranger
- Carter Beauford, American drummer, percussionist, and founding member of Dave Matthews Band
- Stanley Draper, an influential community leader responsible for the development of Oklahoma City
- Kate Flannery, actress, played Meredith Palmer (2005–2013) in the television comedy The Office
- Wendy Gooditis, an American real estate agent, educator, and Democratic politician.
- Tiffany Lawrence, a former Democratic member of the West Virginia House of Delegates, representing the 65th district.
- Harold Perrineau, actor, played Link in The Matrix Reloaded and The Matrix Revolutions
- J. Robert Spencer, an American musical theatre and television actor, who was nominated for a Tony Award for his work in the Broadway musical Next to Normal
- Carl Tanner, an American operatic tenor
- Haley Van Voorhis, the first woman to play a non-kicking position in NCAA football
- Mac Wiseman, Bluegrass music legend
- Richard Zarou, a contemporary composer of concert and film music and the host of the new music podcast No Extra Notes
