= John Miley Maphis House =

Historic house in Virginia, United States

- U.S. National Register of Historic Places
- Virginia Landmarks Register
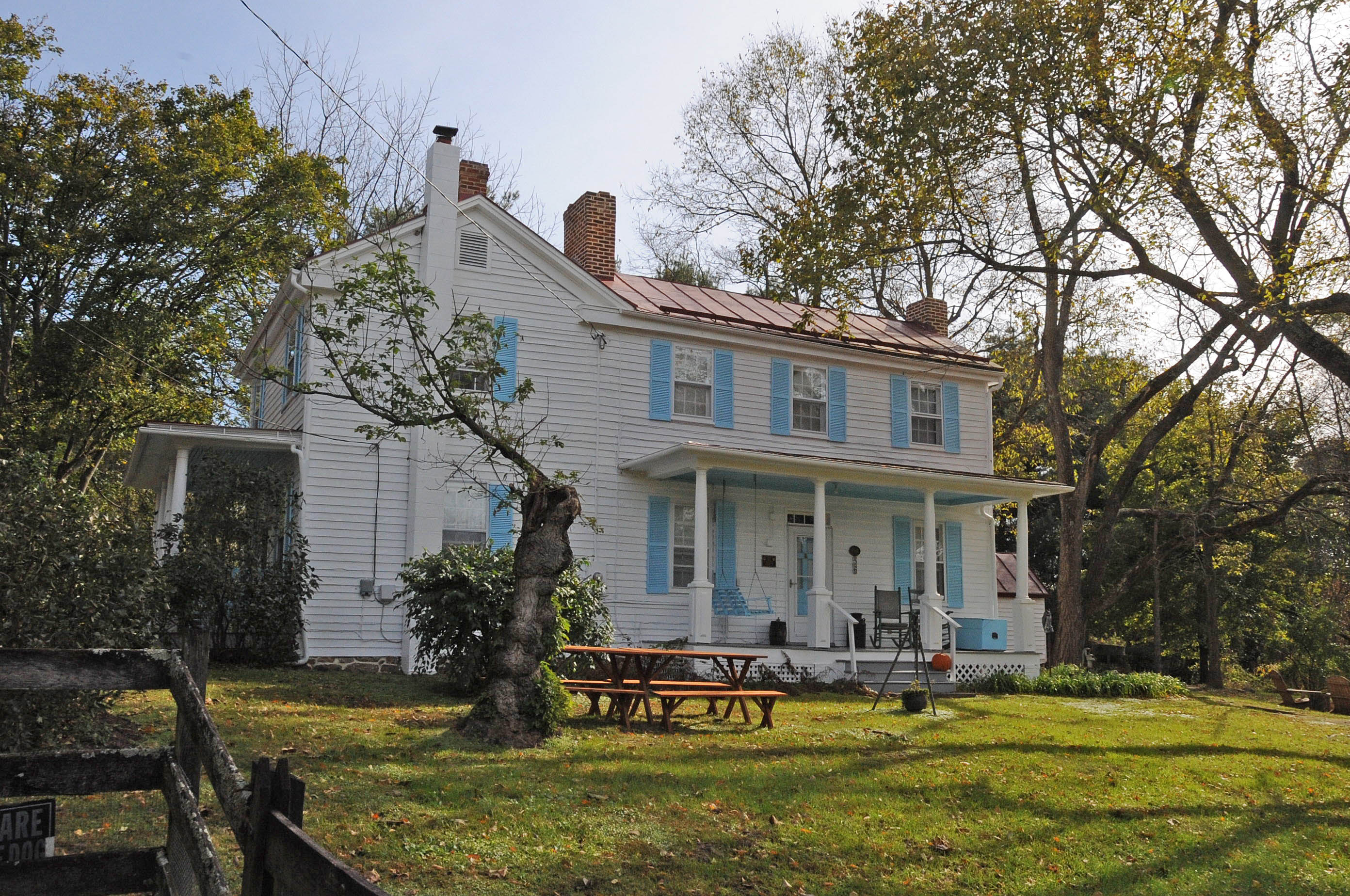
- View through trees

- Location within Virginia Location within the United States
- Location: 56 Bell's Ln., near Edinburg, Virginia
- Coordinates: 38°50′20″N 78°35′55″W
- Area: 9.817 acres (3.973 ha)
- Built: c. 1856
- Built by: Maphis, John Miley
- Architectural style: Greek Revival, Italianate
- NRHP reference No.: 11000840
- VLR No.: 085-5181

Significant dates
- Added to NRHP: November 22, 2011
- Designated VLR: September 22, 2011

The John Miley Maphis House is a historic home located near Edinburg, Shenandoah County, Virginia. It was built in 1856, and is a frame, two-story, gable-roofed, L-shaped, vernacular Italianate style dwelling. The interior features unusual, boldly scaled, grain painted, late-Greek Revival interior woodwork. Also on the property are the contributing frame bank barn with forebay (c. 1870), a one-story frame wash house with gable roof and forebay (c. 1900), and a shed roofed, frame chicken house with horizontal- and vertical-board siding (c. 1920).

It was listed on the National Register of Historic Places in 2011.
