= Edinburg, Virginia =

- Town
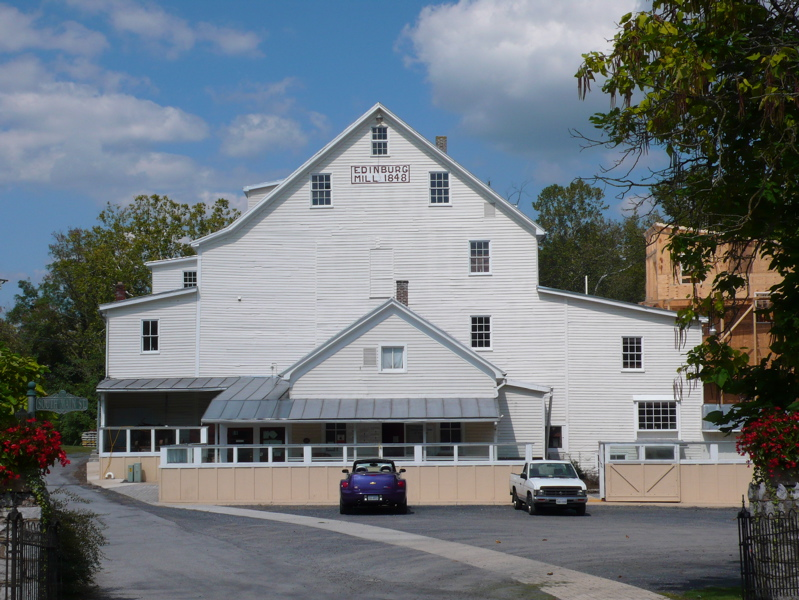
- The Mill in Edinburg, Virginia (1848)

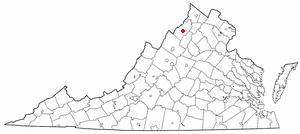
- Location in Virginia
- Coordinates: 38°49′21″N 78°33′55″W
- Country: United States
- State: Virginia
- County: Shenandoah
- Founded: 1852

Government
  - Mayor: Daniel J. Harshman

Area
  - Total: 0.76 sq mi (1.96 km^{2})
  - Land: 0.74 sq mi (1.92 km^{2})
  - Water: 0.019 sq mi (0.05 km^{2})
- Elevation: 807 ft (246 m)

Population (2020)
  - Total: 1,178
  - Estimate (2019): 1,070
  - Density: 1,445/sq mi (557.8/km^{2})
- Time zone: UTC−5 (Eastern (EST))
  - Summer (DST): UTC−4 (EDT)
- ZIP code: 22824
- Area code: 540
- FIPS code: 51-25008
- GNIS feature ID: 1494215
- Website: http://www.townofedinburg.com

Edinburg is a town in Shenandoah County, Virginia, United States. As of the 2020 census, Edinburg had a population of 1,178.

== History ==
The Bowman-Zirkle Farm, Campbell Farm, Clem-Kagey Farm, Edinburg Historic District, Edinburg Mill, Dr. Christian Hockman House, Lantz Mill, and John Miley Maphis House are listed on the National Register of Historic Places.

Before becoming incorporated in 1852, Edinburg was also previously known by the names of Shryock and Stony Creek. The name "Shryock" was used by Prince Bernhard of Saxe-Weimar-Eisenach in 1825 to describe Edinburg as he passed through the Shenandoah Valley.

== Geography ==
Edinburg is located at 38°49′21″N 78°33′55″W (38.822558, −78.565362).

According to the United States Census Bureau, the town has a total area of 0.7 square miles (1.9 km^{2}), all land.

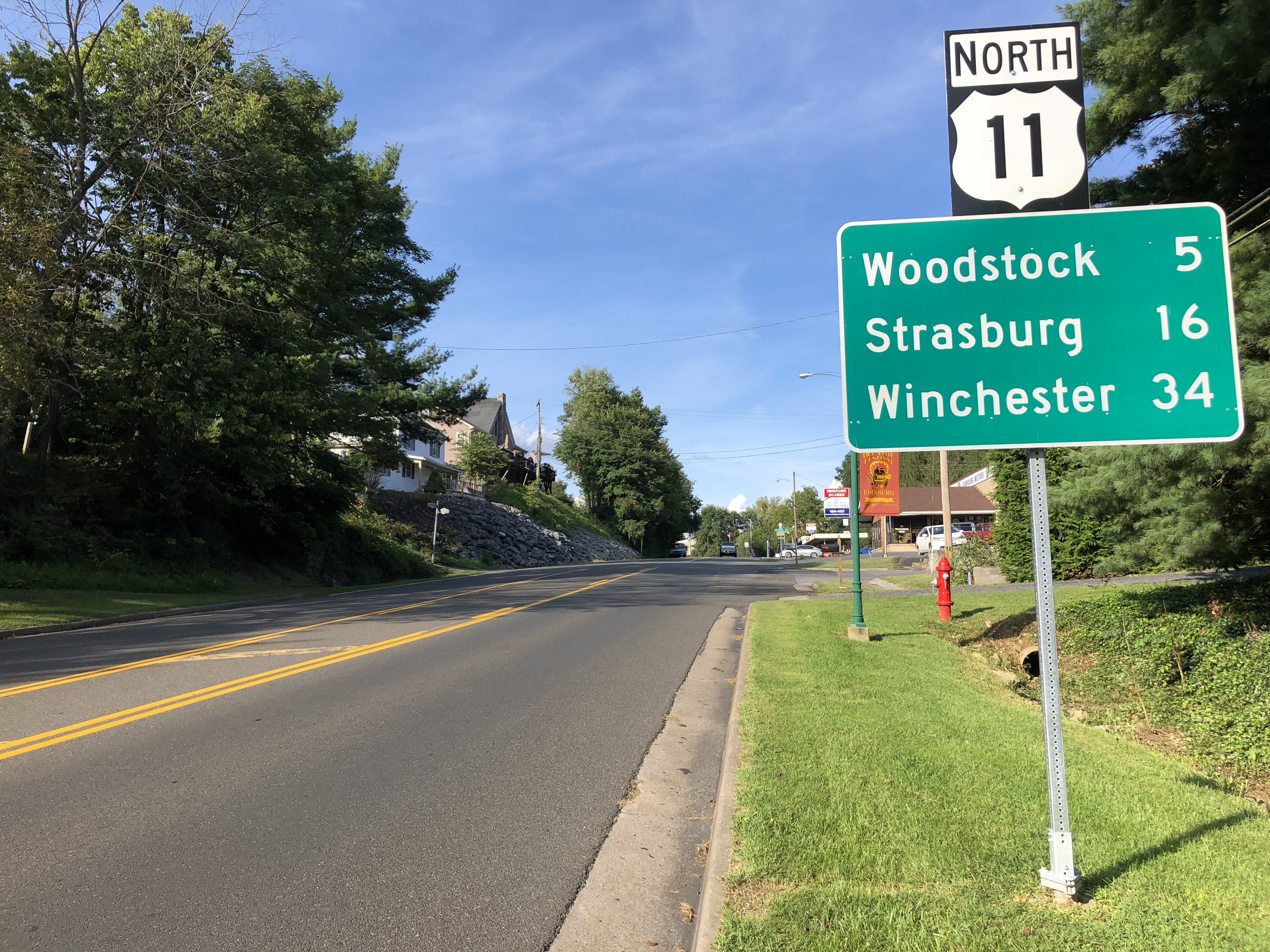
View north along US 11, the primary road through Edinburg

=== Climate ===
Climate data for Edinburg, Virginia (1991–2020)
Month	Jan	Feb	Mar	Apr	May	Jun	Jul	Aug	Sep	Oct	Nov	Dec	Year
Mean daily maximum °F (°C)	42.5 (5.8)	46.0 (7.8)	53.5 (11.9)	65.1 (18.4)	73.5 (23.1)	81.3 (27.4)	85.4 (29.7)	84.0 (28.9)	78.1 (25.6)	67.1 (19.5)	55.6 (13.1)	46.1 (7.8)	64.9 (18.3)
Daily mean °F (°C)	31.9 (−0.1)	34.5 (1.4)	41.3 (5.2)	51.7 (10.9)	61.1 (16.2)	69.6 (20.9)	73.7 (23.2)	72.0 (22.2)	65.4 (18.6)	53.9 (12.2)	43.4 (6.3)	35.2 (1.8)	52.8 (11.6)
Mean daily minimum °F (°C)	21.3 (−5.9)	23.0 (−5.0)	29.1 (−1.6)	38.3 (3.5)	48.7 (9.3)	57.8 (14.3)	61.9 (16.6)	60.0 (15.6)	52.7 (11.5)	40.8 (4.9)	31.3 (−0.4)	24.4 (−4.2)	40.8 (4.9)
Average precipitation inches (mm)	2.38 (60)	1.81 (46)	2.88 (73)	3.12 (79)	4.02 (102)	4.30 (109)	4.07 (103)	3.40 (86)	3.69 (94)	2.55 (65)	2.28 (58)	2.66 (68)	37.16 (943)
Average snowfall inches (cm)	4.8 (12)	7.7 (20)	3.3 (8.4)	0.0 (0.0)	0.0 (0.0)	0.0 (0.0)	0.0 (0.0)	0.0 (0.0)	0.0 (0.0)	0.0 (0.0)	0.1 (0.25)	5.1 (13)	21 (53.65)
Source: NOAA

== Transportation ==
U.S. Route 11 is the main road passing through Edinburg, serving as Main Street. Virginia State Route 185 connects US 11 to Interstate 81, which travels north–south just west of the town limits.

== Demographics ==
Historical population
Census	Pop.	Note	%±
1860	514		—
1870	452		−12.1%
1880	478		5.8%
1890	512		7.1%
1900	512		0.0%
1910	574		12.1%
1920	568		−1.0%
1930	498		−12.3%
1940	565		13.5%
1950	533		−5.7%
1960	517		−3.0%
1970	766		48.2%
1980	752		−1.8%
1990	860		14.4%
2000	813		−5.5%
2010	1,041		28.0%
2020	1,178		13.2%
U.S. Decennial Census

As of the census of 2000, 813 people, 385 households, and 220 families resided in the town. The population density was 1,103.2 people per square mile (424.2/km^{2}). There were 425 housing units at an average density of 576.7 per square mile (221.7/km^{2}). The racial makeup of the town was 93.97% White, 0.12% African American, 0.37% Native American, 3.69% from other races, and 1.85% from two or more races. Hispanics or Latinos of any race were 8.73% of the population.

Of 385 households, 20.5% had children under the age of 18 living with them, 42.6% were married couples living together, 9.9% had a female householder with no husband present, and 42.6% were not families. About 35.8% of all households were made up of individuals, and 15.8% had someone living alone who was 65 years of age or older. The average household size was 2.09 and the average family size was 2.71.

In the town, the population was distributed as 18.1% under the age of 18, 8.4% from 18 to 24, 27.6% from 25 to 44, 24.6% from 45 to 64, and 21.4% who were 65 years of age or older. The median age was 41 years. For every 100 females, there were 92.7 males. For every 100 females age 18 and over, there were 88.1 males.

The median income for a household in the town was $30,655, and the median income for a family was $37,986. Males had a median income of $29,000 versus $18,021 for females. The per capita income for the town was $18,993. About 5.4% of families and 10.6% of the population were below the poverty line, including 2.5% of those under age 18 and 21.5% of those age 65 or over.
