= James R. Wilkins Jr. =

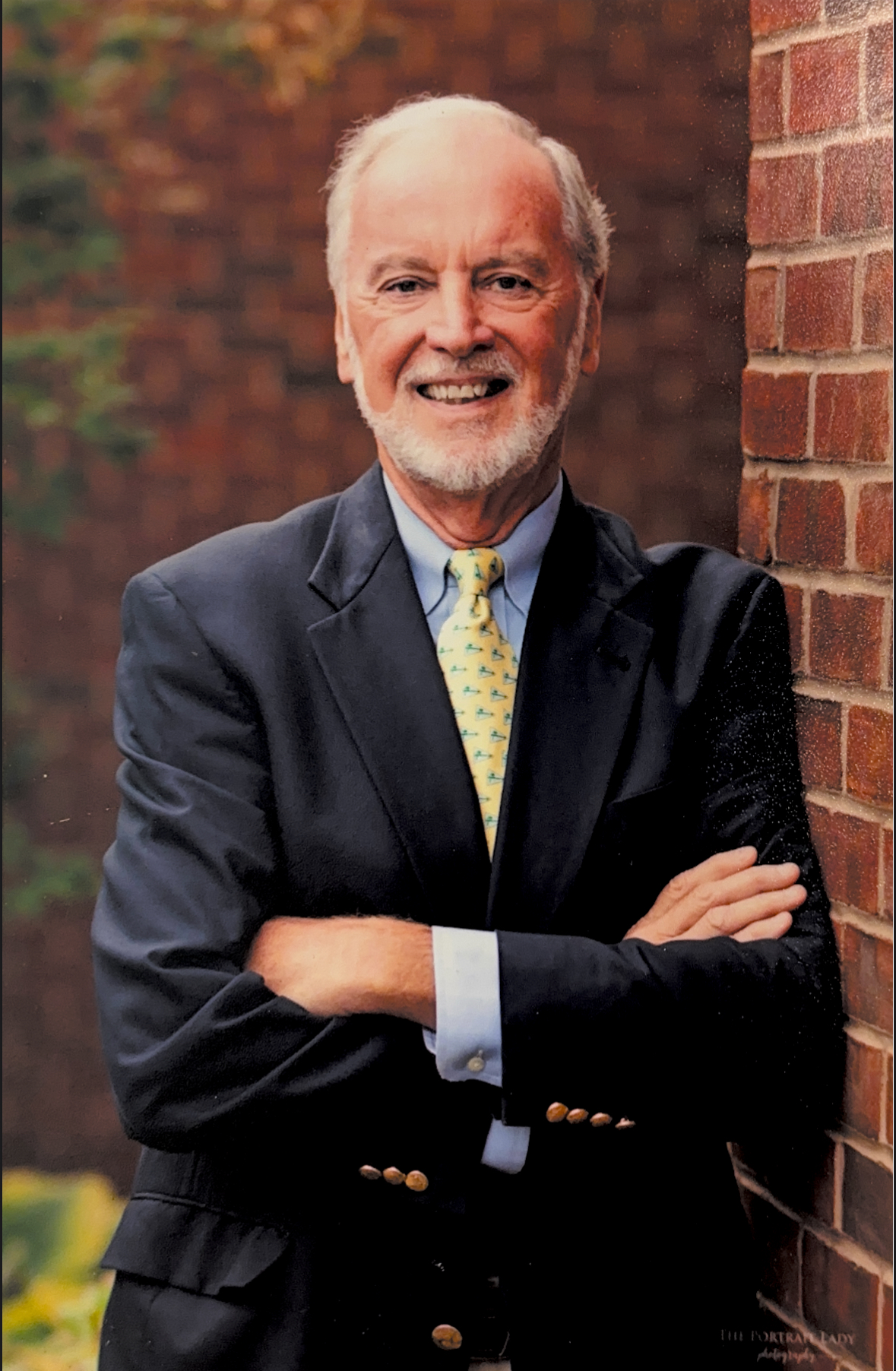
- Born: April 29, 1945 (age 81); Bolling Army Airfield, Washington, D.C.
- Education: Randolph-Macon College, University of Maryland
- Occupations: Entrepreneur, Philanthropist
- Spouse: Elise Hortenstine Wilkins (m. 1966 - div. 1979) Veronica "Roni" Flett Wilkins (m. 1983- present)
- Father: James R. Wilkins Sr.
- Awards: Shenandoah University Presidents Medal (1987); "Retailer of the Year" Virginia Retail Merchants Association (2006); "Citizen of the Year" Winchester-Frederick County Chamber of Commerce (2014)

James R. Wilkins Jr. (born April 29, 1945) is an American entrepreneur, philanthropist, and community leader, recognized for his contributions to the Northern Shenandoah Valley of Virginia, South Carolina, and Montana. He is the son of James R. Wilkins Sr., a businessman and philanthropist in the region. Wilkins has been involved in retail, banking, wildlife conservation, and numerous philanthropic initiatives throughout his career.

== Early life ==
James Richard "Jimmy" Wilkins Jr. was born in Washington, D.C. When he was two years old, his family moved to Winchester, Virginia after his father’s discharge from military service. In 1947, James R. Wilkins Sr. opened Wilkins ShoeCenter, marking the family's entry into the retail business, in Winchester.

As a student at John Handley High School, Wilkins earned All-State honors in football, basketball, and track, making him one of only two graduates in the school's 100-year history to achieve this distinction in three different sports. Following in his father's footsteps, Jimmy developed a strong entrepreneurial spirit and held various odd jobs throughout his youth and early adulthood to support himself. He worked in roles such as cleaning bricks, selling Shenandoah Apple Blossom Festival programs, and working in the family business.

Wilkins attended Randolph-Macon College, setting records in Track and Cross Country. In 1966 he married Elise Hortenstine. The couple had two children: Elizabeth and James Richard Wilkins, III. A year later he graduated from the University of Maryland with a B.A. in political science.

=== Recreational hobbies ===
Wilkins developed a deep passion for the outdoors during his childhood, particularly hunting, which he enjoyed with his father. An avid outdoorsman, Wilkins particularly enjoys hunting wild turkey, elk, as well as fishing for trout throughout North America. Taking a strong interest in wildlife conservation, Wilkins actively supports organizations like the National Wild Turkey Federation starting their endowment in 1974 as well as the Rocky Mountain Elk Foundation.

== Career ==
=== Family business ===
In 1967, after graduating college, Wilkins joined his father in their retail shoe business, Wilkins ShoeCenter. Successfully managing stores in Winchester, Charlottesville, and Lynchburg, Virginia. As Wilkins' parents transitioned to full-time work in their real estate investments, he assumed the role of full-time manager of the shoe store. In 1970, Wilkins' parents and one other long-time investor sold their shares and now the shoe stores were Jimmy’s to run entirely on his own. This change enabled him to implement a more modern approach to business operations. In 2003, Wilkins’ son was critically ill, and he made the difficult decision to sell the Winchester store to a local family and business partner. Wilkins’ son managed the real estate and construction division of their businesses and now Jimmy would be needed to take care of the real estate. The new leadership decided to keep the name, and the store continues to this day as “Wilkins ShoeCenter: Virginia’s largest family shoe store.”

== Community involvement and philanthropy ==
Wilkins became active in civic affairs early in his career. At the age of 28, in 1973, he was appointed President of the Winchester-Frederick Chamber of Commerce. By 1980, at 35 years old, Wilkins successfully campaigned for and was elected to the Winchester City Council, where he was immediately asked to lead the finance committee. He was also involved in local banking, serving on the boards of several regional financial institutions, including Old Dominion Savings and Loan, Jefferson Bank, and The Bank of Clarke County.

=== John Handley High School ===
Wilkins was awarded the John Handley Medal of Honor in 2006 for his significant contributions to the City of Winchester school system. In 2009, he made a $1 million donation towards the renovation of John Handley High School, which led to the football stadium being named in his honor. Most recently, in 2024, Wilkins was recognized by his alma mater during the John Handley Centennial celebration.

=== Shenandoah University ===
Wilkins has been a dedicated advisor to Shenandoah University, serving on the board of trustees from 1980 to 2023, including a term as chair from 2000 to 2002. Throughout his tenure, he successfully led two major capital campaigns. In 2006, Wilkins spearheaded a $65 million capital campaign, and in 2018, he directed a $25 million fundraising initiative for the Athletic and Events Center. As a testament to his contributions, the 77,000-square-foot facility, which opened in 2018, was named the James R. Wilkins, Jr. Athletic and Events Center.

=== Virginia and beyond ===
Wilkins’ philanthropic efforts extend beyond Virginia. Wilkins started the endowment fund for the National Wild Turkey Federation, (NWTF), and he is currently funding $1.5M of a $3M initiative to redesign a visitors’ center for the RMEF in Missoula, Montana.

== Legacy ==
Wilkins ShoeCenter, Inc. was recognized as Virginia Retailer of the Year by the Virginia Retail Merchants Association in 2005. Nearly a decade later, in 2014, James R. Wilkins Jr. was named “Citizen of the Year” by the Top of Virginia Chamber of Commerce, an honor also bestowed upon his father in 1954. He was previously inducted into the Virginia Wild Turkey Federation’s Conservationist Hall of Fame in 2001.

The James R. Wilkins Charitable Trust, established in 1994 by his father, continues its philanthropic mission under Wilkins Jr.'s leadership, with him directing its annual giving efforts. He also plans to launch a new foundation to support nonprofit organizations in the Shenandoah Valley and other causes of personal interest. Despite a long and accomplished career, Wilkins remains deeply engaged in both business and philanthropy, with no intention of slowing down. He partners with his son, James R. Wilkins III, on commercial development projects and continues to manage the pension plans for employees of his former shoe store in Winchester.
