= Roanoke Valley Governor's School for Science and Technology =

Location
- 2104 Grandin Road SW; Roanoke, VA 24015; USA; 37.2551°N 79.9851°W

Information
- School type: Magnet school
- Established: 1985
- NCES District ID: 5102176
- NCES School ID: 510217602232
- Director: Mark Levy
- Faculty: 13 (on an FTE basis)
- Grades: 9–12
- Enrollment: 264
- Colors: Green & Maroon
- Slogan: Be RVGS Determined
- Rivals: CVGS & TJHSST
- Website: www.rvgs.k12.va.us

Roanoke Valley Governor's School for Science and Technology (RVGS) is a Governor's School in Grandin Court, Roanoke, Virginia, United States. RVGS is a magnet school with students from the Roanoke Valley and Roanoke Metropolitan Statistical Area districts. The Roanoke Valley Governor's School for Science and Technology was established in 1985 as one of the original five Academic Year Governor's Schools (AYGS) in Virginia. As an AYGS program, RVGS receives funding from the participating school divisions and the state. The school is a regional program, operated and governed by the RVGS Regional Board populated by one member of each participating division's local School Boards.

== Participating Divisions ==
RVGS is a partnership of seven participating school divisions: Bedford County, Botetourt County, Craig County, Franklin County, Roanoke City, Roanoke County, and Salem City. Students zoned for the following high schools are in the region served by RVGS:

- Cave Spring
- Craig County
- Floyd County
- Franklin County
- Glenvar
- Hidden Valley
- James River
- Liberty
- Lord Botetourt
- Northside
- Patrick Henry
- Salem
- Staunton River
- William Byrd
- William Fleming

== Curriculum ==
RVGS students take a mathematics class, science class, and research elective each year. The students take their remaining courses at their zoned high school (commonly referred to as their "home school"). The core classes commonly taken in the junior and senior years carry the opportunity for college credit, either through AP or Dual enrollment. For all courses, RVGS meets and exceeds the normal standards and AP/DE guidelines to create courses that are truly unique to the RVGS program.

=== Mathematics ===
RVGS mathematics classes include: RVGS Algebra II, RVGS Precalculus, AP Calculus AB, DE Accelerated AP Calculus|AP Calculus BC (includes AB and BC in a single year, called "ALC" from the previous course name, Accelerated Laboratory Calculus), AP Calculus BC, DE Multivariable Calculus, and AP/DE Statistics.

=== Science ===
RVGS science classes include RVGS Physics, RVGS Chemistry, DE Biology, AP Chemistry, AP Physics C: Mechanics (calculus-based mechanics), and AP Environmental Science.

=== Electives ===
RVGS research electives focusing on facilitating independent experimental research. Through their elective course, students complete scientific or engineering projects focusing on a topic of their choice. These classes meet once a week for much of the school year until the January "Intersession" period, when students spend all school time in the elective class working on their research project. All electives at RVGS require a formal research paper, verifiable data and a presentation. At the end of the month, the students present their projects at the RVGS Project Forum, where professionals from various STEM fields volunteer to judge and provide feedback. Following judging, there is an open house where the public could view the projects of every student, followed by presentation of awards.

Every first-year student at RVGS must take Fundamentals of Research (FOR) as an elective. FOR is designed as an introduction to independent laboratory research and experiments follow three separate pathways: Microbiology, Animal Science, and Plant Science. To prepare for the final projects, the class meets once a week to discuss the completion of a formal research paper, working with a partner to collect data, analyze data through observation/statistics tests, and research to bring all of the data together into a research paper/presentation.

RVGS research electives include: Fundamentals of Research, Biotechnology, Applied Chemical Research, Environmental Research, Engineering Design and Fabrication, Product Design Engineering, Python Coding, Mentorship, Computational Biology & Bioinformatics, and Research Psychology.
