= Bent Mountain, Virginia =

- Unincorporated community
- Location within Virginia Location within the United States
- Coordinates: 37°08′28″N 80°07′09″W
- Country: United States
- State: Virginia
- County: Roanoke
- Elevation: 2,612 ft (796 m)
- Time zone: UTC-5 (Eastern (EST))
  - Summer (DST): UTC-4 (EDT)
- ZIP code: 24059
- Area code: 540
- GNIS feature ID: 1477109

Bent Mountain is an unincorporated community in Roanoke County, Virginia, United States. Bent Mountain is located on U.S. Route 221, 13.6 miles (21.9 km) southwest of Roanoke. Bent Mountain has a post office with ZIP code 24059.

== Geography ==
At over 2,600 feet in elevation, "...it affords one of the clearest views of the Roanoke Valley."

The community of Bent Mountain sits, as the name implies, on top of the large and fertile Bent Mountain Plateau. It is located in the extreme Southwest corner of Roanoke County and is in close proximity to neighboring Floyd, Franklin, and Montgomery counties. The geographic borders of the mountain are also partially located in Floyd County, which has inspired the annual "Bent Mountain Brawl" Benefit Game between the Cave Spring Knights and the Floyd County Buffaloes.

== History ==
The roads through Bent Mountain are also historic. "The Salem and Bent Mountain Turnpike Company was charted in 1840 to build a road from Salem, Virginia across Twelve O'clock Knob to Back Creek and thence to the top of Bent Mountain. The road was long delayed in construction, but the route planned was eventually used, and the road is now a hard surfaced state highway." Part of this road followed the famous Trader's Path.

There are two theories about the origin of the name, "Bent Mountain." One of them is that the mountain is named for two early surveyors in the area, James Bent and William Bent, who were brothers and from Pennsylvania. The second theory is that the mountain is shaped like a horseshoe or "bent" mountain. There is also a tradition that the Bent Mountain area had settlers before the rest of the region, probably soon after 1740.

After the Civil War, Jordan Woodrum purchased a large tract of "waste land", mostly mountainous tree and shrub, and thought by many to be of little value. However, he planted the hillsides with Newtown Pippin apple trees, and sparked a new era in agriculture in the region.

During Prohibition Bent Mountain had the largest distillery in Roanoke County on Bottom Creek Lane.

== Education ==
Bent Mountain is served by Roanoke County Public Schools, with students attending Cave Spring High School. In 2010, the student population of Bent Mountain Elementary School dropped below 50, forcing Roanoke County Schools to close the 100 year old educational institution and send the Bent Mountain area students to neighboring Back Creek Elementary.
