= Mike McGuire (basketball) =

American basketball coach (born 1979)

Current position
- Title: Head coach
- Team: Radford
- Conference: Big South
- Record: 213–185 (.535)

Biographical details
- Born: March 18, 1979 (age 47); Vinton, Virginia
- Education: Roanoke (2000)

Coaching career (HC unless noted)
- 2001–2002: Roanoke (men's asst.)
- 2002–2006: William Byrd HS
- 2006–2008: Hidden Valley HS
- 2008–2013: Richmond (asst.)
- 2013–present: Radford

Head coaching record
- Overall: 213–185 (.535)

Accomplishments and honors

Championships
- Big South regular season (2017); Big South Conference Tournament (2019)

Awards
- 4 Big South Coach of the Year (2015, 2018, 2019, 2026)

Mike McGuire (born March 18, 1979) is the head coach of the Radford University women's basketball team.

In six years as a high school basketball coach, he accumulated a record of 105–52 (.669). At Hidden Valley High School, McGuire led the team to back to back Virginia Group AA state titles. Over those two years, at Hidden Valley High School, he accumulated a record of 55–5 (.917).

== Head coaching record ==
- Radford
- Big South

Record table
Season	Team	Overall	Conference	Standing	Postseason
Radford University (Big South Conference) (2013–present)
2013–14	Radford	7–23	5–15	T–9th	
2014–15	Radford	17–14	14–6	T–2nd	WNIT 1st round
2015–16	Radford	18–13	13–7	T–3rd	
2016–17	Radford	24–9	14–4	1st	WNIT First round
2017–18	Radford	24–9	15–3	2nd	WNIT Second round
2018–19	Radford	26–7	17–1	1st	NCAA First Round
2019–20	Radford	17–12	15–5	2nd	WNIT (Cancelled due to COVID-19)
2020–21	Radford	9–11	9–9	6th	
2021–22	Radford	7–23	3–15	T–10th	
2022–23	Radford	14–17	9–9	T–4th	
2023–24	Radford	13–17	9–7	3rd	
2024–25	Radford	14–17	10–6	T–3rd	
2025–26	Radford	23–13	12–4	2nd	WNIT Second Round
Radford:		213–185 (.535)	145–91 (.614)		
Total:		213–185 (.535)			
National champion Postseason invitational champion Conference regular season champion Conference regular season and conference tournament champion Division regular season champion Division regular season and conference tournament champion Conference tournament champion
