= Glenvar, Virginia =

Glenvar
- Census-designated place (CDP)
- Location within the Commonwealth of Virginia
- Coordinates: 37°16′26″N 080°08′02″W
- Country: United States
- State: Virginia
- County: Roanoke
- Elevation: 1,089 ft (332 m)

Population (2010)
  - Total: 976
- Time zone: UTC-5 (Eastern (EST))
  - Summer (DST): UTC-4 (EDT)
- ZIP code: 24153
- Area code: 540
- FIPS code: 51-31488
- GNIS feature ID: 1494959

Glenvar is a census-designated place (CDP) in western Roanoke County, Virginia, United States. As of the 2020 census, Glenvar had a population of 892. The center of the community lies along US 11/US 460 about one mile west of the Salem city limits. The community is home to Glenvar High School which serves most of the western sections of Roanoke County. As a result, the entire area of Roanoke County which is west of Salem and in the Roanoke Valley between Poor Mountain and Fort Lewis Mountain, including other communities such as Wabun, Fort Lewis, and Dixie Caverns, is often called Glenvar.

In January 2020 the Swedish truck maker Volvo announced that they would build an assembly plant for its subsidiary Mack trucks in Glenvar. The plant was expected to employ 250 people. This was reported by the Roanoke Times by Casey Fabris on 30 January 2020. However, the global pandemic of the coronavirus has halted production temporarily at all Mack (Volvo) locations in Pennsylvania, Maryland, and Virginia.

== Demographics ==
Historical population
Census	Pop.	Note	%±
2010	976		—
2020	892		−8.6%
U.S. Decennial Census; 2010 2020

Glenvar was first listed as a census designated place in the 2010 U.S. census.
