= Twelve O'clock Knob =

Mountain in Virginia, United States

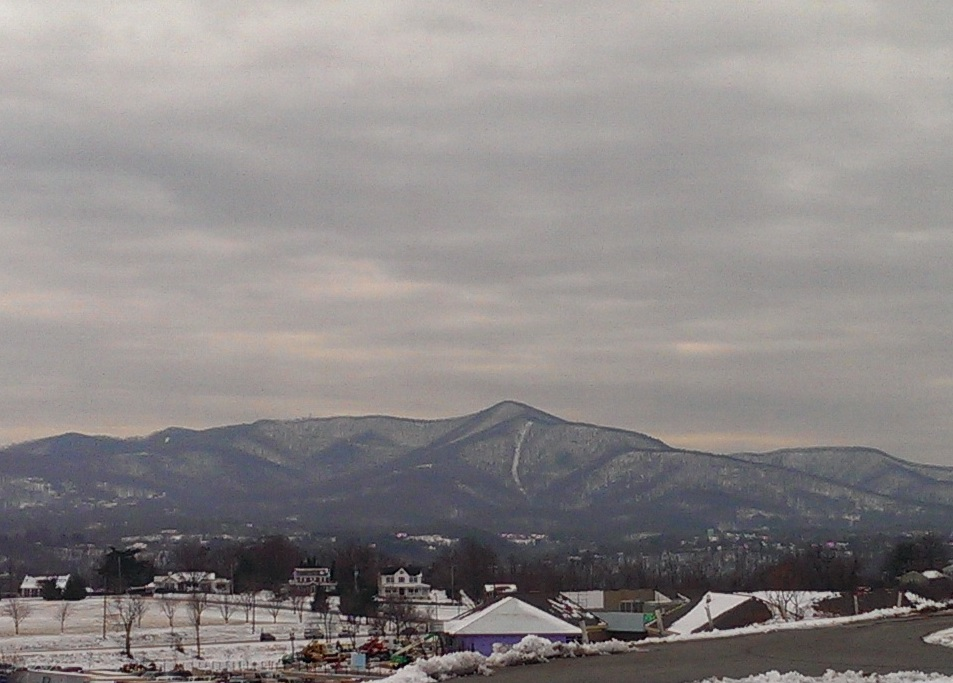
- Looking southwest at Twelve O'clock Knob

Highest point
- Elevation: 2,671 ft (814 m)
- Coordinates: 37°14′54.80″N 80°05′04.04″W

Geography
- Location: Roanoke County, Virginia, U.S.
- Parent range: Appalachian Mountains, Blue Ridge Mountains
- Topo map: USGS Bent Mountain

Climbing
- Easiest route: Road

Twelve O'clock Knob is a mountain located in southwestern Roanoke County, Virginia, directly south of Salem, Virginia. According to local lore, enslaved people in the western Roanoke Valley noted that the Sun was directly over the mountain roughly around noon local time. In 1995 and 1996, the Tour DuPont staged a time trial in the Roanoke Valley, the highlight of which was a ride over the steep, winding Twelve O'clock Knob Road. The north slope of the ridgeline formed by Poor Mountain, Twelve O'clock Knob and adjacent peaks such as Sugarloaf Mountain mark the southwestern boundary of the Roanoke Valley.

This mountain should not be confused with Twelve O'Clock Knob in Patrick County, Virginia.
