= Hidden Valley High School (Virginia) =

Public school in Virginia, United States

Location
- 5000 Titan Trail; Roanoke, Virginia 24018; United States; 37°13′15.3″N 80°1′3.13″W

Information
- Established: August, 2002
- School district: Roanoke County Public Schools
- Superintendent: Jamie Soltis
- Principal: Josh Whitlow
- Grades: 9–12
- Enrollment: 832 (2024)
- Capacity: 1,251
- Language: English
- Colors: Navy Blue and Vegas Gold
- Athletics conference: Virginia High School League; Region 3D; River Ridge District
- Nickname: Titans
- Rivals: Cave Spring High School; Salem High School; Patrick Henry High School; William Byrd High School
- Website: www.rcps.us/hvhs

Hidden Valley High School is a public high school in Roanoke County, Virginia. It is one of the five high schools in the Roanoke County Public Schools system. The other four high schools that serve Roanoke County are Cave Spring High School, Glenvar High School, Northside High School and William Byrd High School.

== History ==
Roanoke County Public Schools established Hidden Valley High School in August 2002, opening its doors for the 2002–03 school year. Its establishment had come in response to overcrowding at Cave Spring High School, an issue that had been prevalent since the 1960s due to increased enrollment. Enrollment at Cave Spring High School was limited to grades 10–12 in contrast to the contemporary educational preference to house grades 6–8 in middle school and grades 9–12 in high school. In 1997 the Roanoke Times reported the formation of a 22 member community committee which concluded the need for the allocation of 100 million dollars to the construction of a new school to serve the area. There was significant debate about whether to split Cave Spring High School's student population into two schools or keep it intact in a renovated or newly constructed building because of the school's well-regarded reputation in academics. A failed bond referendum reported by the Roanoke Times proposed the expansion of Cave Spring High School to a 2,000 student capacity. It was decided by the committee to construct a new 1,100 capacity school somewhere in Southwest County. The construction of the school cost a total of 22.2 million dollars and had an initial student population of 900. The building covers a total of 201,000 sq ft across two floors.

The name "Hidden Valley" was selected to correspond to Hidden Valley Middle School. The high school is not in the Hidden Valley section of Roanoke County and is a little over 3 miles (4.8 km) from the middle school. Woods End, the designation for the tract of land, was also considered for its name. The incoming student population selected the nickname "Titans" in response to the film Remember the Titans which dramatized the 1971 state-championship football team from T. C. Williams High School of Alexandria, Virginia that was released two years earlier.

== Academics ==
Hidden Valley High School is a comprehensive high school which includes grades 9–12 with a student enrollment of 1,211. The school offers courses in multiple academic disciplines including Advanced Placement courses. The core classes provided include English, social studies, health/PE, math, and science. Specialty classes are also provided and include art, business, computer science, foreign language, marketing, music, technology education, and theater arts. Specialized arts and vocational education is available at places like Arnold R. Burton Technology Center in Salem, or the Roanoke Valley Governor's School for Science and Technology in Roanoke. Pass rates for Virginia's Standards of Learning tests average over 90%, which makes the school fully accredited. Hidden Valley High formerly housed the Specialty Center for Mass Communications, until it was moved to The Burton Center for Art and Technology in the 2006–07 school year.

== Enrollment (2024-25 School Year) ==
- 292 freshmen
- 247 sophomores
- 293 juniors
- 177 seniors

== Athletics ==
As of the 2024-2025 school year, Hidden Valley High school offers the following athletic programs to its students: football, volleyball, indoor track, outdoor track, golf, cross country running, basketball, swim and dive, baseball, softball, men’s and women’s soccer, men’s and women’s lacrosse, men’s and women’s tennis, and wrestling.

The school requires those participating in athletics to be in good standing in at least five of their accredited classes and have passed five accredited classes the previous semester.

The Hidden Valley Football team is among several in the Roanoke Valley. The standing of the team has notably been diminished in the past few years. For the 2023-2024 year the school competed in ten varsity football games and won only one. In the opening game for the 2024-2025 season against William Fleming the school lost the game with a score of 90-0.

== Band programs ==
Approximately 20% of the student body are involved in band programs at the school. There are three instrumental music classes during the school day: the concert band, symphonic band, and the wind ensemble. The three bands have earned an "Excellent" and "Superior" at the annual Virginia Band and Orchestra Directors Association (VBODA) concert festival. Also provided are morning and afternoon jazz bands, a morning instrumental ensemble (cancelled in 2010–11 due to under-enrollment), and the school's "Mighty Titan Marching Band". The marching band consists of over 200 members, a Class 5A band, and is one of the largest in the state. It has earned both "Excellent" and "Superior" ratings at the annual VBODA marching festival, including a "Superior" from all 5 judges in 2006. Other musical programs offered by the school include music theory and choir.

Hidden Valley High School's choir has performed in the Disney World Candlelight Processional in 2003–2007, 2009 and 2010. Various members of the choir also sang backup for Bob Carlisle when he came to Roanoke for a small performance in November 2004.

== Clubs ==
The Hidden Valley High School has a variety of clubs for students to join. These include national organizations such as Beta Club, Technology Student Association, DECA, FCCLA, Fellowship of Christian Athletes, Key Club, Students for Life, Young Democrats, and Young Republicans; language clubs for French, German, Latin, and Spanish; athletic clubs for archery and both dance team and spirit club; academic clubs for debate, science, and math; and special-interest organizations, including clubs for drama, Bible study, environmentalism, diversity and inclusion, tabletop gaming, and amateur radio. Their yearbook program has won the state title and has placed nationally every year the school has been open. Last year the program was nominated for a Pacemaker Award, and took second place in the CSPA Crown Category. Clubs must be sponsored by a teacher or staff member.

== Notable alumni ==
- Luke Hancock — former professional basketball player, studio analyst for the ACC Network
