= Cave Spring High School (Roanoke, Virginia) =

Public school in Roanoke, Virginia, United States

Location
- 3712 Chaparral Drive; Roanoke, Virginia 24018; United States; 37°12′48″N 80°0′3″W

Information
- School type: Public high school secondary school
- Established: 1956; 70 years ago
- School district: Roanoke County Public Schools
- Superintendent: Dr. James Soltis
- Principal: Haley L. Deeds
- Teaching staff: 69.20 (FTE) (2024–25)
- Grades: 9–12
- Gender: Co-educational
- Enrollment: 1,046 (2024–25)
- Student to teacher ratio: 15.57 (2024–25)
- Colors: Red & Black
- Athletics conference: Virginia High School League; AAA Region D River Ridge District
- Nickname: Knights
- Accreditation: Virginia Department of Education
- Website: www.rcps.us/cshs

Cave Spring High School is a four-year public secondary high school in Roanoke, Virginia, United States. It is under the jurisdiction of Roanoke County Public Schools. Cave Spring is one of two high schools that serve southwest Roanoke County and one of five high schools that serve the Roanoke County school district.

== Communities served ==
Cave Spring High School is located in the eponymous Cave Spring CDP and has a jurisdiction that includes suburban areas centered around Virginia State Route 419 and rural areas along the U.S. Route 220 and U.S. Route 221 corridors. Communities served include:

- Back Creek
- Bent Mountain
- Cave Spring
- Clearbrook
- Starkey
- Wright

== History ==
Cave Spring High School opened in 1956. In 1968, the high school was moved to its current site, while its original building became Cave Spring Intermediate School, then renamed Cave Spring Junior High School, and would later become Cave Spring Middle School in 2002. Cave Spring held grades 10-12 for numerous years until 2002, when it fed approximately half of its 10-12 population into Hidden Valley High School after it was completed and first opened. In 2019, the high school underwent a $43.3 million renovation, with the "new" Cave Spring opening its doors in August 2020.

== Academics ==
According to U.S. News & World Report, Cave Spring ranks 2nd in the Roanoke Valley, 3rd in Southwest Virginia, and 52nd in the Commonwealth of Virginia in terms of academic quality. Cave Spring students are also eligible to take classes at the Roanoke Valley Governor's School for Science and Technology and the Arnold R. Burton Technology Center.

== Athletics ==
Cave Spring athletes are known as the "Cave Spring Knights" and compete in the Virginia High School League's River Ridge District in regular season play, primarily against other schools in the Roanoke and New River Valleys. The Knights are also part of Class 3 (state classification) and Region D (for regional play), competing against similarly sized schools in Virginia. The Knights have won team state titles in:

- Boys' basketball (2002, 2009, 2010, 2020, 2022)
- Volleyball (2002, 2003, 2005, 2006, 2011)
- Cheerleading (2014, 2015, 2018, 2021, 2023, 2024, 2025)
- Girls' tennis (2015, 2016, 2018)
- Scholastic Bowl (2016, 2017, 2018)
- Boys' swimming and diving (2000, 2001)
- Girls' gymnastics (1976, 1981)
- Boys' soccer (2018)
- Softball (2013)
- Boys' golf (1964).

== Notable alumni ==
- Gregg Marshall (1981) — former Wichita State head basketball coach
- George Canale (1983) — Milwaukee Brewers 1st baseman
- Lapthe Flora (1983) — United States Army Major General
- Ronde Barber (1993) — former Tampa Bay Buccaneers and University of Virginia cornerback, Pro Football Hall of Fame inductee in 2023
- Tiki Barber (1993) — former New York Giants and University of Virginia running back, former NBC News anchor and co-founder of Thuzio
- Chris Obenshain (2000) — former Virginia House of Delegates election from the 41st district
- Tyler Lumsden (2001) — pitcher for the Uni-President 7-Eleven Lions
- JJ Redick (2002) — consensus National College Player of the Year at Duke University, retired NBA player, head coach of the Los Angeles Lakers
- Jen Lilley (2003) — actress in The Artist, NBC's Days of Our Lives, ABC's General Hospital, MTV's Disaster Date, and several Hallmark Channel movies and Great American Family movies
- Danny Aiken (2006) — retired long-snapper who played in the National Football League and former University of Virginia football player
- Kevin Munson (2007) — former professional baseball player
