= Roanoke Region =

Area of Virginia, US

Coordinates: 37°15′N 79°55′W

The Roanoke Region (/ˈroʊ.əˌnoʊk/ ROH-ə-nohk) is the area of the Commonwealth of Virginia surrounding the city of Roanoke. Its usage may refer to the metropolitan statistical area or the Roanoke Valley, but it sometimes includes areas in the Allegheny Mountains and New River Valley which includes Alleghany County, Montgomery County, Covington, Clifton Forge, Blacksburg, Christiansburg, and Radford. Bedford County and Floyd County are sometimes included as part of the region.

The Roanoke Region, excluding communities in the New River Valley, has a population of 316,802. If including the New River Valley, its population is 475,130.

Both the Roanoke Region and the Roanoke MSA are sometimes referred to as the Roanoke Valley (or Greater Roanoke Valley) and are often included in the NewVa region. The Roanoke Valley, however, more accurately describes the geographic depression between the Blue Ridge Mountains where many of the region's communities are located (see Roanoke Valley). Notable places and landmarks in the Roanoke Region include the Blue Ridge Parkway, the Blue Ridge Mountains, the Allegheny Mountains, the Roanoke River, Virginia Tech, the Mill Mountain Star, the Booker T. Washington monument, the Fincastle Court House, and Smith Mountain Lake.

== Definitions and regional organizations ==
=== Roanoke Metropolitan Statistical Area ===
As defined by the United States Office of Management and Budget (OMB), the Roanoke MSA includes four counties, two independent cities, and 21 incorporated towns and census-designated places.

- Counties
  - Botetourt
  - Craig
  - Franklin
  - Roanoke
- Cities
  - Roanoke (principal city)
  - Salem
- Incorporated Towns and Census-designate places
  - Blue Ridge (census-designated place)
  - Boones Mill
  - Buchanan
  - Cave Spring (census-designated place)
  - Cloverdale (census-designated place)
  - Daleville (census-designated place)
  - Eagle Rock (census-designated place)
  - Ferrum (census-designated place)
  - Fincastle
  - Glen Wilton (census-designation place)
  - Henry Fork (census-designated place)
  - Hollins (census-designated place)
  - Laymantown (census-designated place)
  - New Castle
  - North Shore (census-designated place)
  - Penhook (census-designated place)
  - Rocky Mount
  - Troutville
  - Union Hall (census-designated place)
  - Vinton
  - Westlake Corner (census-designated place)

=== Roanoke Region ===
The Roanoke Region is defined by many regional economic, planning, and tourism organizations. The most common definition includes communities located within the Roanoke Valley and Allegheny Mountains. It typically includes

The Roanoke Regional Partnership, a regional, nonprofit economic development organization formed by area businesses and local governments, defines the region as including the counties of Roanoke, Botetourt, Franklin, and Alleghany; the cities of Roanoke, Salem, and Covington; and the town of Vinton. The same region is defined by the Commonwealth of Virginia as the Workforce Investment Area III, but also includes Craig County. The LWIA-III service area is also served by the Roanoke Valley-Alleghany Regional Commission, an organization that provides analysis, demographic research, and other regional data for the state and local governments.

The Roanoke Valley Convention and Visitors Bureau (RCVB), which promotes tourism in the region and provides conference and meeting services for business and visitors, excludes Alleghany County from its definition, but includes Bedford, Montgomery, and Floyd counties, although it gives less attention to these areas in its promotional materials. The Roanoke Regional Chamber of Commerce (RRCC) advocates and provides various professional services to businesses within the region, which it more strictly defines as Botetourt, Craig, Franklin, and Roanoke counties, and Roanoke and Salem cities.

Various media outlets, periodicals, and magazines in the region include different areas in their coverage. The most widely distributed and read newspaper, The Roanoke Times, includes Bedford, Botetourt, Floyd, Franklin, Giles, Montgomery, and Roanoke counties, as well as, Radford, Roanoke, and Salem cities in its coverage area. Other periodicals, magazines, and television news outlets include the same communities, but also Lynchburg, Amherst County, and Rockbridge County.

Thus, the Roanoke Region typically refers to the following communities:

- Alleghany County
- Botetourt County
- Covington
- Franklin County
- Roanoke County
- Roanoke City
- Salem

And, less often, also includes:

- Bedford County
- Blacksburg
- Christiansburg
- Floyd County
- Giles County
- Montgomery County
- Radford
- Pulaski County

== Economy and major industries ==
The Roanoke Region has a diverse economic base that includes finance, service, retail, transportation, manufacturing, health care and life sciences. Alongside Montgomery County, the region is also a major technology and research hub, home to Virginia Tech and several technology companies. The region serves as the medical, cultural, retail, media, and commercial center for nearly a million people, and is the largest place for employment opportunities in western Virginia.

=== Finance, insurance, and real estate ===
Several banks and insurance providers are headquartered (or regionally headquartered) in the region, including:

- Atlantic Credit and Finance (Headquarters)
- BB&T (Regional headquarters)
- Bank of America (Regional headquarters)
- Bank of Botetourt (Headquarters)
- Bank of Fincastle (Headquarters)
- Brown Edwards (Certified public accounting firm headquarters)
- Delta Dental of Virginia (Virginia headquarters)
- First Citizens Bank (Regional headquarters)
- Goodman & Company (Regional office of one of the largest Virginia-based certified public accounting firms)
- Hometown Bank (Headquarters)
- KPMG (Regional office)
- Shenandoah Life Insurance (Headquarters)
- SunTrust (Regional headquarters)
- Valley Bank (Headquarters)
- Wachovia Securities (Regional headquarters)

The region is also home to top ranked Virginia Tech's Pamplin College of Business and Radford University College of Business and Economics.

=== Transportation ===
The first major industry in the region was the railroad industry. The transportation and transportation-related manufacturing industries have since grown and include:

- Altec Industries — Aerial devices for utility and telecommunications trucks
- Advance Auto Parts — Automotive aftermarket parts; Former headquarters
- Cardinal Rubber & Seal — Hydraulic, rubber, plastic hoses, belting and packing
- Corning, Inc. — Substrates and cellular ceramic supports for catalytic converters
- Dynax America — Automatic transmission clutch disc plates
- Graham White — Components for rail, trucks, and buses
- Metalsa — Heavy truck parts
- Norfolk Southern — Railroad
- Salem Preferred Partners — Hydrogen generating fuel modules
- Salem Vent — Metal stamped components for heavy truck cabs
- TMD Friction — Brake friction components
- Virginia Forge — Wheel hubs for auto industry
- Volvo North America — Heavy truck assembly plant
- Westport — Axle assemblies for Volvo trucks
- WestRock — High performance friction papers for automatic transmissions
- Yokohama Tire Corporation — Passenger and light truck tires

=== Health care and life sciences ===
The health care and life science industries are anchored by the Carilion Clinic, one of the largest health care companies in Virginia and the region's largest employer, and Virginia Tech, both of which recently partnered to establish the Virginia Tech Carilion School of Medicine. Also, Carilion Clinic, Virginia Tech, and the University of Virginia have collaborated in establishing the Fralin Biomedical Research Institute. Other major health care related firms include:

- Accellent – Medical devices
- American Biosystems – Direct-fed microbials used in waste treatment, feed and aquaculture products
- Attention Point – R&D of assessment tools for the diagnosis of ADHD
- Emtech Laboratories – Hearing care products
- Excel Prosthetics – Custom-made prosthetics and orthotics
- Foot Levelers – Custom orthotics, pillows and exercise equipment for spinal stabilization
- Intrexon – DNA control systems to enhance safety and outcomes of biological therapeutics
- Ion Healthcare – Products and services for sleep apnea diagnosis
- Keraderm – Medical device to treat nail infections
- Luna Innovations – Biotech instrumentation, nanotechnology
- McAirlaid's – Non-woven composite materials for absorbency end uses
- Microscope.com – One of the largest Internet retailers of microscopes in the world
- Nature Diagnostics – Performs genetic diagnostics of agriculture products
- Novonesis Biologicals – Enzymes for industrial cleaning, odor control, turf/plant health (Formerly Novozymes)
- OcuCure Therapeutics – Ophthalmic eye drops to treat age-related macular degeneration
- Pixel Optics – Spectacle lenses for the correction of presbyopia
- Plastics One – Cochlear implants, other medical devices
- Precision Fabrics – Surgical drapes
- ProGenetics – R&D, production of biologically produced therapeutics
- Revivicor –Regenerative medicine, R&D of treatments for diabetes and whole organ transplantation (xenotransplantation, stem cells)
- Schultz-Creehan – Contract R&D, materials science, and industrial engineering
- Smart Perfusion – R&D of organ perfusion and transplant systems
- Surgical Tools – Distributor of high-quality German surgical tools
- TechLab – Develops, manufactures, distributes intestinal diagnostic assays
- Virginia Prosthetics – Custom-made prosthetics and orthotics
- Wireless MedCARE – Wireless and web-connected medical devices and applications

== Geography and climate ==
The Roanoke Region covers approximately 2,349.3 sq mi (6,085 km^{2}) of land, and approximately 31 sq mi (80 km^{2}). of water. The region is located within the Appalachian Mountains, specifically the Blue Ridge and Allegheny Mountains. There are also two major rivers, the James River and the Roanoke (Staunton) River, that pass through the Roanoke Region. There are several small lakes, including Lake Moomaw and Carvins Cove, as well as one major lake, Smith Mountain Lake. The region is in the temperate broadleaf and mixed forest biome. Smith Mountain Lake, the Blue Ridge Parkway, the Appalachian Trail, the rivers and streams, Dixie Caverns, the Botetourt County blueways, and the mountains attract thousands of visitors to the region each year.

The climate of the Roanoke Region is humid subtropical with four distinct seasons. The average temperature in January is 34.7 °F (1.5 °C); July is 75.6 degrees. The average yearly rainfall is 42.7 inches (1,080 mm) and snowfall is 27.2 inches.

== History ==
=== Early history ===
The earliest history of the Roanoke Region exists as archaeological evidence of Native American tribes which settled by the Roanoke River, which takes its name from the Algonquian word for the shell "money" found in the waters.

In the mid-1770s, Scotch-Irish and German settlers reached the upper Roanoke Valley traveling on the Great Wagon Road down the Shenandoah Valley from Pennsylvania. Settlers also followed the James River from eastern Virginia. As tradesmen and farmers moved into the region, new counties and communities were established.

Botetourt County was established in 1770, carved out from Augusta County. The county was named for the popular governor of the Virginia Colony, Lord Botetourt. The county's boundaries extended west all the way to the Mississippi River including most of Kentucky, West Virginia, Ohio, Indiana, and Illinois. The town of Fincastle in Botetourt served as the gateway to the American West and was the starting point for Lewis and Clark's famous exploration of the Louisiana Purchase. Botetourt's early role is preserved in the Fincastle Courthouse, designed by Thomas Jefferson.

Formed from parts of Bedford and Henry County and named for Benjamin Franklin, Franklin County was established in 1785. It produced one of the nation's most respected leaders, eminent black educator Booker T. Washington, who was born April 5, 1856, on the Burroughs Plantation, approximately sixteen miles northeast of Rocky Mount. His childhood was spent as a slave, and he lived in a one-room cabin. After emancipation and a successful quest to educate himself, Washington established a new black school in 1881 in Tuskegee, Alabama. Known as the Tuskegee Institute, the college helped Washington achieve his goal of educating his people to provide opportunities. His birthplace is preserved today as the Booker T. Washington National Monument.

Alleghany County was formed out of Botetourt in 1822 and named for the Allegheny Mountains. During the Civil War, the county provided much-needed iron resources for the Confederate troops; Longdale Furnace provided the iron for the Merrimack.

Roanoke County was formed from Botetourt in 1838, taking its name from the Roanoke River. The county eventually annexed additional territory in 1845 from Montgomery County, and historic Salem continues to serve as the county seat. The town of Salem, established in 1802, served travelers on the Great Wagon Road and was located on two stagecoach lines. It was the major center of activity in the Roanoke area until the mid-1880s. In 1847, the Virginia Institute, a boy's preparatory school, moved to Salem from Staunton and was renamed Roanoke College. Salem became an independent city in 1968.

Towns formed within what is now the City of Roanoke in the first decades of the 19th century. Antwerp was subdivided in 1801, followed by Gainesborough in 1825 (the present Gainsboro neighborhood) and Old Lick in 1834. The Gainesborough settlement remained the most populous community until 1874 when the town of Big Lick was chartered. The unique name was derived from salt marshes that attracted wildlife to the area. This tiny village of less than five hundred people was to become the town of Roanoke in 1882 and in 1884, the city of Roanoke. The new town was located along the old Atlantic, Mississippi and Ohio Railroad, later to become the Norfolk and Western Railway.

=== The history of transportation ===
With the Great Wilderness Road and Botetourt County serving as the gateway to the American West, the Roanoke Region was always an intersection for travel and transportation. In the 1850s, the region became a major hub for the nation's developing railroad system. The Virginia and Tennessee Railroad (V&T) came to Big Lick, linking Lynchburg to Bristol and transforming the region. A system was developed to link three railroads across the southern tier of Virginia to form the Atlantic, Mississippi & Ohio Railroad (AM&O). When the Shenandoah Valley Railroad linked Hagerstown, Maryland to the AM&O in Roanoke in 1882, it became the Norfolk & Western Railway. This marked the beginning of a period of rapid growth for the City of Roanoke which was called "the magic city" during this time. The Town of Vinton also was incorporated at this time.

To further enhance Roanoke's reputation as a rail hub, The Virginian Railway was built in the early 20th century along the Roanoke River and merged with Norfolk & Western in 1959.

In Alleghany County, the Virginia Central Railroad had extended its track from Staunton to the Jackson River in 1857. After the Civil War, the railroad expanded west to connect with the Covington and Ohio Railroad and in 1868 the two lines merged to form the Chesapeake and Ohio Railway (C&O). The railroad established a depot and named it Clifton Forge, the only town in the United States to bear its name. When the track to Richmond was completed in 1881, the town boomed as a railway hub and remains as the region's only stop on the Amtrak line.

Access to the coalfields of Southwest Virginia made N&W prosperous, transporting the world-famous Pocahontas bituminous coal which fueled half the world's navies. N&W became famous for manufacturing steam locomotives in the Roanoke Shops.

C&O Railway was eventually obtained by CSX Transportation, merging the railways of Clifton Forge with the larger system that exists today.

Interstate highways also have made a significant impact on the region. Interstate 81 runs from Canada to Tennessee paralleling the Alleghany Mountains in Virginia. Interstate 64 runs from Chesapeake, Virginia to St. Louis, Missouri. An excellent transportation infrastructure has been a hallmark of the Roanoke Region for more than 150 years.

=== Present ===
In Franklin County, a 1960s era project to build the hydroelectric Smith Mountain Dam created the largest lake in Virginia, Smith Mountain Lake, which is an economic powerhouse for the region. The lake's 20,600 acres (83 km^{2}) and 500 miles (800 km) of shoreline are dotted with luxury homes and condominiums. It is popular for recreation and recognized for boating, skiing, and fishing. Bassmasters tournaments are televised nationally from the lake.

The region combines a host of well-known nature-based attractions such as the Appalachian Trail, Blue Ridge Parkway, and Jackson and James Rivers with a growing and sophisticated business community.

== Culture ==
The Roanoke Region has a diverse culture. There are a number of music and performing arts venues and groups, a prospering arts community and lively nightlife, and a unique set of outdoor opportunities.

=== Arts, theater and music ===
The region boasts a thriving arts community with more than 40 art galleries throughout the area. The Taubman Museum of Art in downtown Roanoke City is a work of modern architecture. The museum that recently hosted Cirque du Soleil and features numerous exhibits. The colleges in the region all each maintain museums and galleries, capturing the work of students, faculty, and regional, national, and international artists. The communities in the region each have art festivals and shows.

The Roanoke Region is home to professional live theater. The Mill Mountain Theatre offers several shows a year including classics and originals. The Roanoke Civic Center also regularly features traveling Broadway shows and a variety of other famous plays. Community theater and college theater are also prevalent in the region.

The region has a long history in music and is a featured stop along Virginia's Heritage Music Trail, also known as the Crooked Road. There are several venues throughout the region that host nationally and internationally recognized music acts, including the Roanoke Civic Center, the Jefferson Center, the Salem Civic Center, Roanoke College Gymnasium, and Lane Stadium at Virginia Tech. Smaller venues also host traveling music acts as well as the growing local music scene.

== Education ==
There are 11 institutes of higher education in the Roanoke Region. Colleges and universities include:

- ECPI University
- Ferrum College
- Hollins University
- Radford University Carilion (formerly Jefferson College of Health Sciences)
- Mountain Gateway Community College (formerly Dabney S. Lancaster Community College)
- National College
- Radford University
- Roanoke College
- Southern Virginia University
- Virginia Tech
- Virginia Western Community College

The Roanoke Higher Education Center, located in Downtown Roanoke, is the satellite campus for a number of Virginia colleges and universities.
