= Riverside, Virginia =

- Unincorporated community
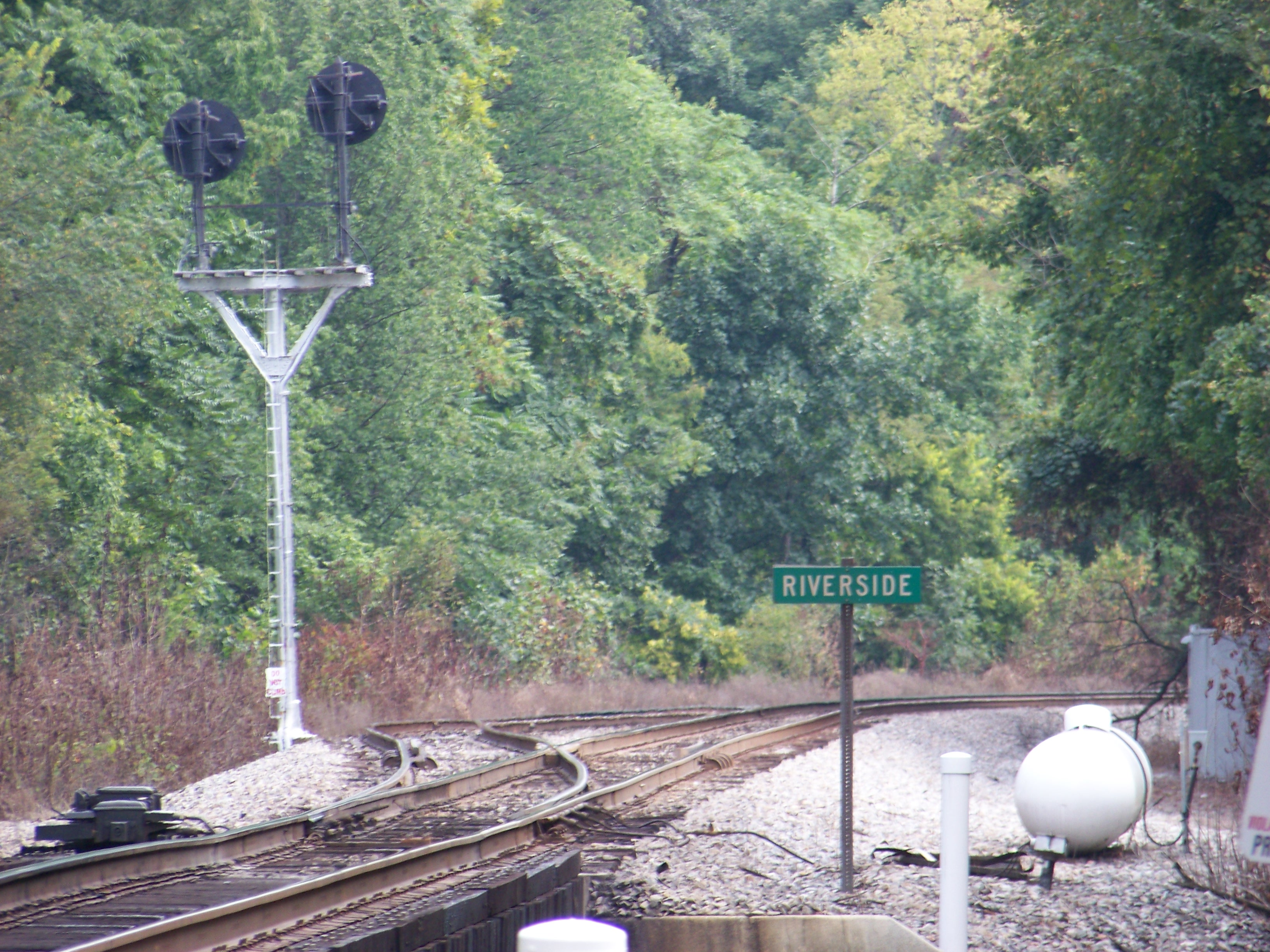

- Location within the Commonwealth of Virginia Riverside, Virginia (the United States)
- Coordinates: 37°14′46″N 80°10′30″W
- Country: United States
- State: Virginia
- County: Roanoke
- Elevation: 1,135 ft (346 m)
- Time zone: UTC-5 (Eastern (EST))
  - Summer (DST): UTC-4 (EDT)
- ZIP code: 24153
- Area code: 540
- GNIS feature ID: 1495131

Riverside is an unincorporated community in western Roanoke County, Virginia, United States. The community lies along the Roanoke River near Dixie Caverns along U.S. 11/U.S. 460. The area is more commonly referred to as Dixie Caverns instead of Riverside.
