= Cave Spring, Virginia =

- CDP
- Location within Shenandoah Valley Location within Virginia Location within the United States
- Coordinates: 37°13′59″N 80°0′23″W
- Country: United States
- State: Virginia
- County: Roanoke

Area
  - Total: 11.8 sq mi (30.6 km^{2})
  - Land: 11.8 sq mi (30.6 km^{2})
  - Water: 0 sq mi (0.0 km^{2})
- Elevation: 1,099 ft (335 m)

Population (2020)
  - Total: 26,755
- Time zone: UTC−5 (Eastern (EST))
  - Summer (DST): UTC−4 (EDT)
- ZIP code: 24018
- Area code: 540
- FIPS code: 51-13720
- GNIS feature ID: 1493547

Cave Spring is a census-designated place (CDP) in Roanoke County, Virginia, United States. The population was 26,755 at the 2020 census. Cave Spring covers much of the area known locally as "Southwest County" which has the most affluent suburbs of Roanoke. It is part of the Roanoke metropolitan area.

Roanoke County's administrative offices are in Cave Spring, though the independent city of Salem is officially the county seat.

The United States Postal Service considers most of the Cave Spring area to be unincorporated Roanoke City.

== Geography ==
Cave Spring is at 37°13′59″N 80°0′23″W (37.233170, −80.006252).

According to the United States Census Bureau, the CDP has a total area of 11.8 square miles (30.6 km^{2}), all land.

== Demographics ==
=== 2020 census ===
As of the 2020 census, Cave Spring had a population of 26,755. The median age was 43.4 years. 20.6% of residents were under the age of 18 and 21.6% of residents were 65 years of age or older. For every 100 females there were 89.0 males, and for every 100 females age 18 and over there were 86.1 males age 18 and over.

100.0% of residents lived in urban areas, while 0.0% lived in rural areas.

There were 11,671 households in Cave Spring, of which 27.0% had children under the age of 18 living in them. Of all households, 47.2% were married-couple households, 16.3% were households with a male householder and no spouse or partner present, and 31.0% were households with a female householder and no spouse or partner present. About 32.8% of all households were made up of individuals and 15.3% had someone living alone who was 65 years of age or older.

There were 12,466 housing units, of which 6.4% were vacant. The homeowner vacancy rate was 1.8% and the rental vacancy rate was 9.6%.

Racial composition as of the 2020 census
Race	Number	Percent
White	21,819	81.6%
Black or African American	1,477	5.5%
American Indian and Alaska Native	64	0.2%
Asian	1,359	5.1%
Native Hawaiian and Other Pacific Islander	9	0.0%
Some other race	452	1.7%
Two or more races	1,575	5.9%
Hispanic or Latino (of any race)	1,168	4.4%

=== 2000 census ===
As of the census of 2000, there were 24,941 people, 10,997 households, and 7,082 families residing in the CDP. The population density was 2,108.1 people per square mile (814.0/km^{2}). There were 11,556 housing units at an average density of 976.8/sq mi (377.2/km^{2}). The racial makeup of the CDP was 92.96% White, 2.43% African American, 0.08% Native American, 2.96% Asian, 0.02% Pacific Islander, 0.45% from other races, and 1.10% from two or more races. Hispanic or Latino of any race were 1.51% of the population.

There were 10,997 households, out of which 27.6% had children under the age of 18 living with them, 54.2% were married couples living together, 7.9% had a female householder with no husband present, and 35.6% were non-families. 30.5% of all households were made up of individuals, and 10.1% had someone living alone who was 65 years of age or older. The average household size was 2.26 and the average family size was 2.84.

In the CDP, the population was spread out, with 22.1% under the age of 18, 6.9% from 18 to 24, 27.9% from 25 to 44, 27.3% from 45 to 64, and 15.8% who were 65 years of age or older. The median age was 41 years. For every 100 females there were 89.8 males. For every 100 females age 18 and over, there were 86.6 males.

The median income for a household in the CDP was $51,182, and the median income for a family was $64,550. Males had a median income of $43,350 versus $29,242 for females. The per capita income for the CDP was $30,318. About 1.7% of families and 3.2% of the population were below the poverty line, including 2.6% of those under age 18 and 2.4% of those age 65 or over.

== Education ==
Cave Spring is served by Roanoke County Public Schools and includes two high schools:

- Cave Spring High School
- Hidden Valley High School

== Notable people ==
- Ronde Barber- Pro Football Hall of Fame cornerback, Tampa Bay Buccaneers
- Tiki Barber- former running back, New York Giants
- Gregg Marshall- former head basketball coach, Wichita State University
- J. J. Redick- Head coach of the Los Angeles Lakers, former NBA shooting guard
