= Wabun =

Wabun may refer to:

- Wabun code, Japanese Morse code
- Wabun, Virginia, place in the United States
- Wabun Tribal Council, regional First Nations advisory council in Ontario, Canada
- Wabun, a wind god, further information may be found under: Anishinaabe traditional beliefs
