= Roanoke County Public Schools =

School division in Virginia, United States

- 5937 Cove Road Roanoke, Virginia, 24019

District information
- Superintendent: Dr. Jamie Soltis
- NCES District ID: 5103330

Students and staff
- Students: 13,723 (2021-22)
- Teachers: 1,008 (on an FTE basis)

Other information
- Website: https://www.rcps.us

Roanoke County Public Schools is the branch of the government of Roanoke County, Virginia responsible for public K–12 education. Like all public school systems in Virginia, it is legally classified as a school division. Although it performs the functions of school districts in other U.S. states, it lacks independent taxing authority and relies on appropriations from the local government.

== Schools ==
=== High Schools ===
- Arnold R. Burton Technology Center - Salem
- Cave Spring High School - Cave Spring
- Glenvar High School - Glenvar
- Hidden Valley High School - Cave Spring
- Northside High School - North Roanoke
- William Byrd High School - Vinton

=== Middle Schools ===
- Cave Spring Middle School - Cave Spring
- Glenvar Middle School - Glenvar
- Hidden Valley Middle School - Roanoke
- Northside Middle School - North Roanoke
- William Byrd Middle School - Vinton

=== Elementary Schools ===
- Back Creek Elementary School
- Bonsack Elementary School
- Burlington Elementary School
- Cave Spring Elementary School
- Clearbrook Elementary School
- Fort Lewis Elementary School
- Glen Cove Elementary School
- Glenvar Elementary School
- Green Valley Elementary School
- Herman L. Horn Elementary School
- Mason's Cove Elementary School
- Mount Pleasant Elementary School
- Mountain View Elementary School
- Oak Grove Elementary School
- Penn Forest Elementary School
- W.E. Cundiff Elementary School

== Feeder School Pattern ==
=== Cave Spring ===
- Back Creek Elementary School
- Cave Spring Elementary School (split with Hidden Valley)
- Clearbrook Elementary School
- Green Valley Elementary School (split with Hidden Valley)
- Penn Forest Elementary School

=== Glenvar ===
- Fort Lewis Elementary School
- Glenvar Elementary School
- Mason's Cove Elementary School

=== Hidden Valley ===
- Cave Spring Elementary School (split with Cave Spring)
- Green Valley Elementary School (split with Cave Spring)
- Oak Grove Elementary School

=== Northside ===
- Burlington Elementary School
- Glen Cove Elementary School
- Mountain View Elementary School

=== William Byrd ===
- Bonsack Elementary School
- Herman L. Horn Elementary School
- Mount Pleasant Elementary School
- W.E. Cundiff Elementary School
