= Kevin Munson =

American professional baseball pitcher (born 1989)

- Pitcher
- Born: January 3, 1989 (age 37); Roanoke, Virginia, U.S.
- Bats: Right Throws: Right
- Stats at Baseball Reference

Kevin Lee Munson (born January 3, 1989) is an American former professional baseball pitcher. Before beginning his professional career, Munson attended James Madison University and played college baseball for the James Madison Dukes. He was drafted by the Arizona Diamondbacks, and selected by the Philadelphia Phillies in the 2013 Rule 5 draft.

== Career ==
=== Amateur ===
Munson attended Cave Spring High School in Roanoke, Virginia. He then enrolled at James Madison University, where he played college baseball for the James Madison Dukes baseball team. Munson played collegiate summer baseball for the Bourne Braves of the Cape Cod Baseball League in 2009, was named a league all-star, and helped lead Bourne to the league title. After the 2010 season, he was named the Colonial Athletic Association's pitcher of the year and a third team All-American by Collegiate Baseball Newspaper.

=== Arizona Diamondbacks ===
The Arizona Diamondbacks selected Munson in the fourth round of the 2010 MLB draft, with the 121st selection. He signed with the Diamondbacks, receiving a $243,000 signing bonus. After the 2011 and 2012 seasons, the Diamondbacks sent him to the Arizona Fall League. By 2013, he reached Triple–A, the highest level of minor league baseball, where he pitched for the Reno Aces. Mike Parrott, Reno's pitching coach, said Munson is "a good candidate to [at] some time be called up to the big leagues next year.".

On December 12, 2013, Munson was selected by the Philadelphia Phillies with the fourth pick in the Rule 5 draft. According to the rules, Munson had to make the Phillies' Opening Day roster and remain with the team for the entire season, or the Phillies will have to offer Munson back to the Diamondbacks. After competing for a spot in the Phillies' bullpen during spring training, he was returned to the Diamondbacks on March 18, 2014.

Munson pitched for Reno in 2014, compiling a 4–3 win–loss record with a 2.60 earned run average. After the season, the Diamondbacks added Munson to their 40-man roster to protect him from the next Rule 5 draft. Munson pitched in 36 games split between the rookie–level Arizona League Diamondbacks, Double–A Mobile BayBears, and Triple–A Reno. The majority of his work came in Reno, where he posted a 4.45 ERA with 30 strikeouts and 2 saves in 32 1/3 innings of work. On August 31, 2015, Munson was designated for assignment after Phil Gosselin was activated from the injured list. He elected free agency following the season on October 13.

=== Seattle Mariners ===
On July 1, 2016, Munson signed a minor league contract with the Seattle Mariners. In 19 appearances for the Triple–A Tacoma Rainiers, he recorded a 4.44 ERA with 28 strikeouts across 26 1/3 innings of work. Munson elected free agency following the season on November 7.

=== Lancaster Barnstormers ===
On March 28, 2017, Munson signed with the Lancaster Barnstormers of the Atlantic League of Professional Baseball. He became a free agent after the 2017 season. Signed with the Tigres Del Licey, in the winter of 2017. Had a 3.12 ERA with 11 strikeouts in 8 2/3 innings pitched.

On February 19, 2018, Munson re-signed with the Lancaster Barnstormers. He became a free agent following the season.

=== Southern Maryland Blue Crabs ===
On May 8, 2019, Munson signed with the Southern Maryland Blue Crabs of the Atlantic League of Professional Baseball. He became a free agent following the season.

=== Seattle Mariners (second stint) ===
On January 7, 2020, Munson signed a minor league contract with the Seattle Mariners. He did not play in a game in 2020 due to the cancellation of the minor league season because of the COVID-19 pandemic. Munson became a free agent on November 2.

On January 5, 2021, Munson re-signed with the Mariners organization on a minor league contract. On April 15, Munson was released by the Mariners.
