= Wright, Virginia =

- Unincorporated community
- Location within the Commonwealth of Virginia Wright, Virginia (the United States)
- Coordinates: 37°09′55″N 79°58′25″W
- Country: United States
- State: Virginia
- County: Roanoke
- Elevation: 1,089 ft (332 m)
- Time zone: UTC−5 (Eastern (EST))
  - Summer (DST): UTC−4 (EDT)
- ZIP code: 24018
- Area code: 540
- GNIS feature ID: 1495176

Wright is an unincorporated community in southern Roanoke County, Virginia, United States. The community lies along U.S. 220 near the Franklin County line.
