= Tarell Basham =

American football player (born 1994)

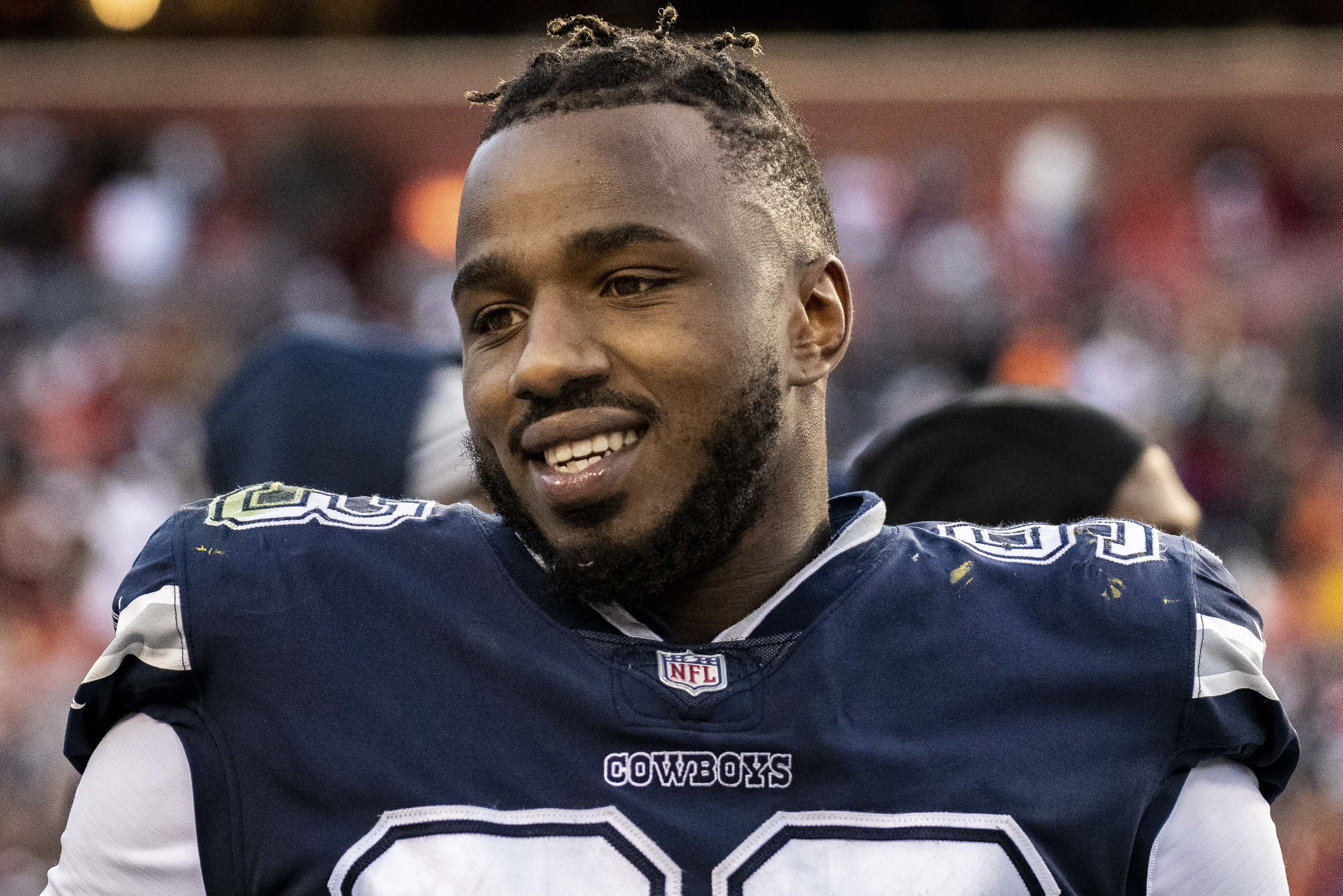
- Basham with the Dallas Cowboys in 2021

Profile
- Position: Defensive end

Personal information
- Born: March 18, 1994 (age 32); Rocky Mount, Virginia, U.S.
- Listed height: 6 ft 4 in (1.93 m)
- Listed weight: 266 lb (121 kg)

Career information
- High school: Franklin County (Rocky Mount, Virginia)
- College: Ohio
- NFL draft: 2017: 3rd round, 80th overall pick

Career history
- Indianapolis Colts (2017–2018); New York Jets (2018–2020); Dallas Cowboys (2021–2022); Tennessee Titans (2022); Cincinnati Bengals (2023)*; San Antonio Brahmas (2024)
- * Offseason or practice squad member only

Awards and highlights
- MAC Defensive Player of the Year (2016); First-team All-MAC (2016); Freshman All-American (2013)

Career NFL statistics
- Total tackles: 128
- Sacks: 11
- Forced fumbles: 5
- Fumble recoveries: 2
- Interceptions: 1
- Pass deflections: 7
- Stats at Pro Football Reference

Tarell Basham (born March 18, 1994) is an American professional football defensive end. He played college football at Ohio, and was selected by the Indianapolis Colts in the third round of the 2017 NFL draft.

== Early life ==
Basham attended Franklin County High School in Rocky Mount, Virginia. He played as a defensive end, tight end and wide receiver. He contributed to the team winning three district titles.

As a senior in 2011, he was a two-way player at wide receiver and linebacker. He also blocked a potential game-winning field goal by Salem High School, helping the Eagles defeat the Spartans in football for the first time in 30 years, 14-13. He received All-Western Valley District, AAA All-Northwest Region and Timesland Defensive Player of the Year honors.

He finished with 82 tackles and 16 sacks in his career. Following high school, Basham attended Hargrave Military Academy for a year, before committing to Ohio University.

== College career ==
Basham accepted a football scholarship from Ohio University. As a true freshman, he started in 5 out of 13 games at defensive tackle, tallying 32 tackles (16 solo), 7.5 sacks (led the team), 9.5 tackles for loss, 5 quarterback hurries, two forced fumbles and one pass defensed. He was named to the Football Writers Association of America (FWAA) Freshman All-American Team. He had 6 tackles and an assist on a sack against the University of Massachusetts Amherst.

As a sophomore, he appeared in all 12 games, including seven starts at defensive end. He posted 33 tackles (15 solo), 6 tackles for loss, 5 sacks, two passes defensed and one forced fumble. He had seven tackles against Marshall University.

As a junior, he appeared in all 12 games, starting 11 at left defensive end. He registered 43 tackles (seventh on the team), 20 solo tackles, 5.5 sacks (led the team), 11 quarterback hurries (led the team), 10 tackles for loss and one pass defensed.

As a senior, he contributed to the school winning the Mid-American Conference (MAC) East Division title for the first time in five years. He recorded a school-record 11.5 sacks, along with 50 tackles (16.5 for loss), 12 quarterback hurries, two passes defensed and two forced fumbles. He received Mid-American Conference Defensive Player of the Year and All-MAC honors.

During his career, he started 37 out of 51 games, contributed to the school making three bowl game appearances, while totaling 158 tackles, 41.5 tackles for loss, 6 passes defensed, 5 forced fumbles, one fumble recovery and a school record 29.5 sacks.

== Professional career ==
Pre-draft measurables
Height	Weight	Arm length	Hand span	40-yard dash	10-yard split	20-yard split	20-yard shuttle	Three-cone drill	Vertical jump	Broad jump	Bench press
6 ft 3 3/4 in (1.92 m)	269 lb (122 kg)	34 1/4 in (0.87 m)	10 1/4 in (0.26 m)	4.70 s	1.60 s	2.71 s	4.35 s	7.27 s	31.5 in (0.80 m)	9 ft 11 in (3.02 m)	15 reps
All values from NFL Scouting Combine

=== Indianapolis Colts ===
Basham was selected by the Indianapolis Colts in the third round (80th overall) of the 2017 NFL draft. He was switched into an outside linebacker. He appeared in 15 games as a backup, registering 7 tackles, 2 sacks, one tackle for loss, 4 quarterback hurries, one forced fumble and one blocked punt.

On October 4, 2018, Basham was waived by the Colts after the team’s 1–3 start.

=== New York Jets ===
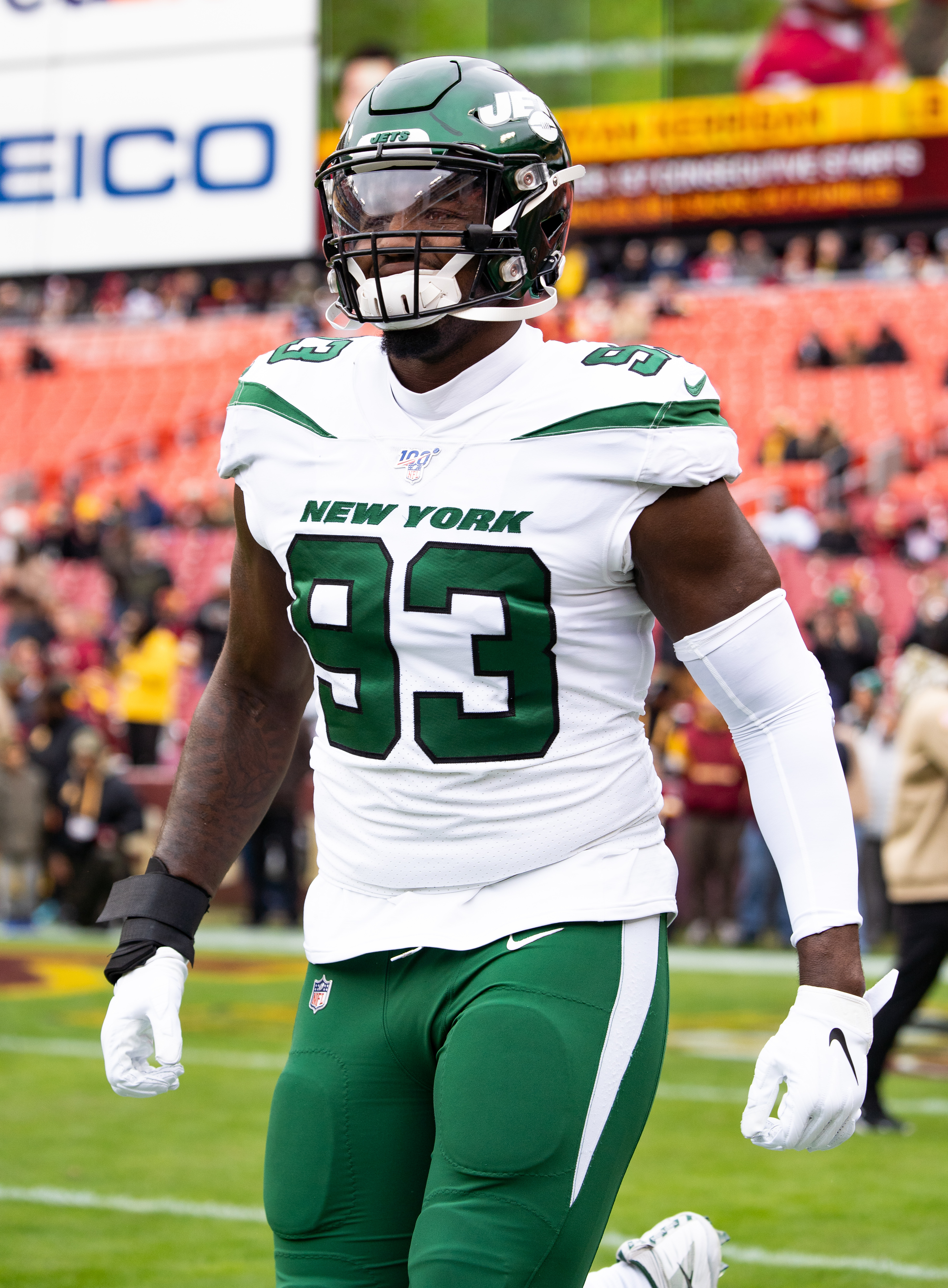
Basham playing for the New York Jets in 2019.

On October 5, 2018, Basham was claimed off waivers by the New York Jets. He appeared in 10 games (one start), making 8 defensive tackles, 2 quarterback hurries and 6 special teams tackles.

In 2019, he appeared in all 16 games (2 starts) and had 36 tackles, 2 sacks, one interception, 9 passes defensed, one fumble recovery and 7 special teams tackles. In week 16 against the Pittsburgh Steelers, Basham recorded his first career interception off a pass thrown by Devlin Hodges during the 16–10 win.

In 2020, he started a career-high nine games, making 33 tackles, 3.5 sacks, 3 forced fumbles and one pass defensed. He had five tackles and one sack against the Cleveland Browns.

=== Dallas Cowboys ===
On March 22, 2021, Basham signed a two-year contract with the Dallas Cowboys. He started 6 out of 17 games, making 38 tackles, 3.5 sacks, 32 quarterback hurries, one fumble recovery and one forced fumble.

In 2022, he suffered a quad injury in the season opener. On September 17, 2022, he was placed on injured reserve. He was activated on November 9. He appeared in two games as a backup defensive end. The Cowboys had a surplus at the defensive end position and he was waived on November 29.

=== Tennessee Titans ===
On December 5, 2022, Basham signed with the Tennessee Titans. He appeared in 5 games as a backup outside linebacker.

=== Cincinnati Bengals ===
On April 5, 2023, Basham signed with the Cincinnati Bengals. He was released on August 25.

=== San Antonio Brahmas ===
On March 11, 2024, Basham signed with the San Antonio Brahmas of the United Football League (UFL). He was placed on the suspended list on March 21, 2024. He was activated on April 23, 2024. He was released on May 6, 2024.

== Personal life ==
Basham is the cousin of defensive end Carlos Basham Jr. and running back Aaron Jones. He has three siblings; Thaddeus Basham, Kamiyah Ford and Tajia Dawson.
