= Radford Highlanders women's basketball =

Radford Highlanders
2025–26 Radford Highlanders women's basketball team
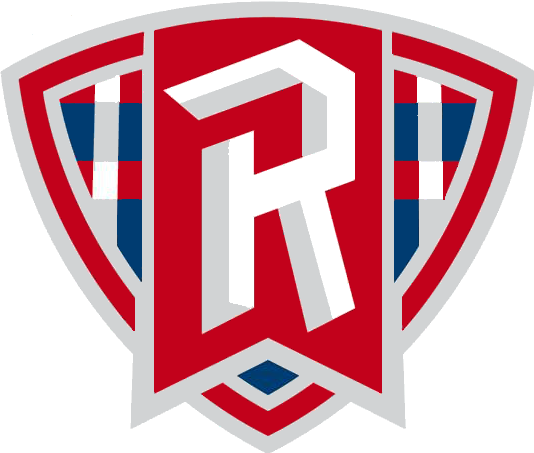
- University: Radford University
- Head coach: Mike McGuire (13th season)
- Location: Radford, Virginia
- Arena: Dedmon Center (capacity: 3,000)
- Conference: Big South
- Nickname: Highlanders
- Colors: Red, gray, and white
- Student section: Radford Rowdies

NCAA Division I tournament appearances
- 1994, 1995, 1996, 2019

Conference tournament champions
- 1987, 1988, 1990, 1991, 1992, 1993, 1994, 1995, 1996, 2019

Conference regular-season champions
- 1987, 1988, 1989, 1990, 1992, 2017, 2019

Uniforms
Home	Away

The Radford Highlanders women's basketball team represents Radford University in NCAA Division I intercollegiate women's basketball competition. They are a member of the Big South Conference.

== History ==
Radford began play in 1971. As of the end of the 2016–17 season, the Highlanders have an all-time record of 707–868–5. They have won six regular season titles and nine conference titles. They have appeared in the NCAA Tournament four times (1994, 1995, 1996, 2019) and the WNIT four times (1989, 2008, 2015, 2017).

== NCAA tournament results ==
Year	Seed	Round	Opponent	Result
1994	#16	First Round	#1 Purdue	L 56−103
1995	#11	First Round	#6 Florida	L 49−89
1996	#16	First Round	#1 Tennessee	L 56−97
2019	#14	First Round	#3 Maryland	L 51−73
