= Franklin County High School (Rocky Mount, Virginia) =

Coordinates: 37°0′15.2″N 79°52′42.9″W

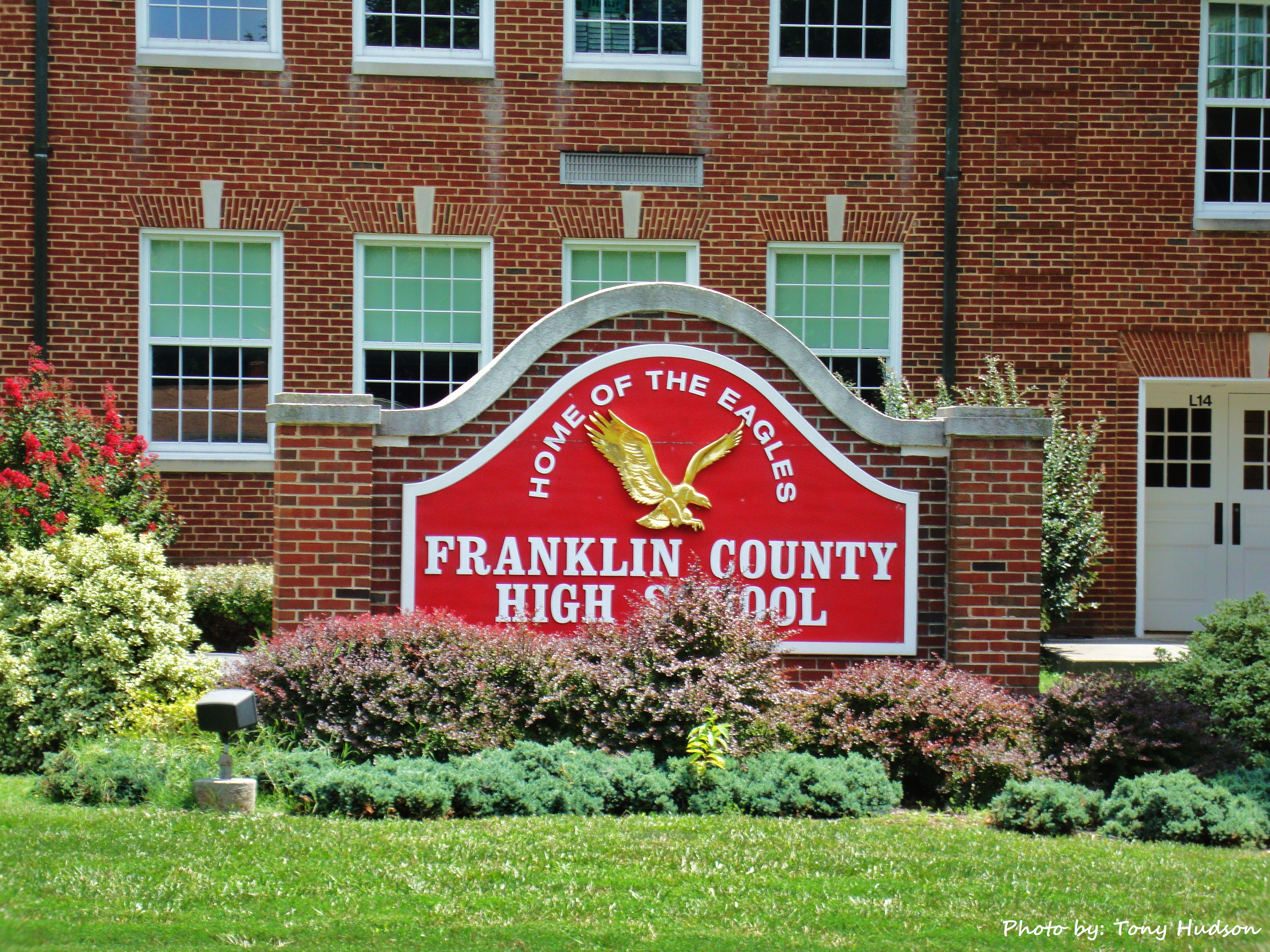
- 700 Tanyard Rd. Rocky Mount, VA 24151; United States

Information
- Type: Public high school
- Motto: Vires per scientiam (Strength through knowledge)
- Established: 1950
- School district: Franklin County Schools
- Principal: Reyhan Deskins
- Faculty: 188.22 (on FTE basis)
- Grades: 9–12
- Enrollment: 1,899 (2023–24)
- Student to teacher ratio: 10.09
- Colors: Red and white
- Athletics conference: Blue Ridge District
- Team name: Eagles
- Website: School website

Franklin County High School(FCHS) is located in Rocky Mount, Virginia. Approximately 1900 students attend Franklin County High School, which was founded in 1950. Since its founding, Franklin County High School, commonly known as FCHS, has grown to the largest school in the state west of Richmond.

As of the 2023–24 school year, the school had an enrollment of 1,899 students and 188.22 classroom teachers (on an FTE basis), for a student-teacher ratio of 10.09.

== Today ==
The school covers twenty five acres and participates in 21 Varsity level sports. The principal of FCHS is Reyhan Deskins.

The campus of Franklin County High School contains eight classroom buildings, three gymnasiums, two cafeterias and an alternative education building. It also includes a 400 m track, and a 6,000-seat football stadium. The swim team practices at the local YMCA.

Franklin County High School hosts foreign exchange students (in 2007 this included students from France, Norway and Germany).

The senior class of 2013 received $3.9 million in scholarships, including a Naval Academy appointment worth $450,000 and scholarships from "Ferrum College (over $1 million), Emory and Henry ($350,000) and Roanoke College ($300,000)" among other colleges.

== Special Opportunities/Programs/Offers ==
=== Roanoke Valley Governor's School ===
Roanoke Valley Governor's School(RVGS) A magnet school for a select number of students who applied and have exemplary academic records. Franklin County High School(FCHS) is part of the Roanoke Valley district which RVGS pulls students from.

=== Eagle Tech ===
Originally located on West campus(2018-2019 and 2019-2020 school years). Eagle Tech is a set of courses that follow a Project-Based Learning(PBL) based learning approach. Currently located in the Tech A building near the Ramsey building and straight across from it.

== Notable alumni ==
- Todd Bodine, NASCAR veteran.
- Virgil Goode, former U.S. Congressman.
- Josh Grisetti, Broadway, television and film actor. (attended but did not graduate)
- Ron Hodges, former Major League Baseball player
- Dwaine Board, former National Football League player and defensive line coach
- Tarell Basham, NFL and UFL outside linebacker
- Nick Robertson, MLB pitcher for the Toronto Blue Jays
- Lewis Preston (basketball), Former Division I Basketball coach .
