= 1944 United States presidential election in Virginia =

- November 7, 1944

Nominee	Franklin D. Roosevelt	Thomas E. Dewey
Party	Democratic	Republican
Home state	New York	New York
Running mate	Harry S. Truman	John W. Bricker
Electoral vote	11	0
Popular vote	242,276	145,243
Percentage	62.36%	37.39%
County and independent city results
Roosevelt
40–50%
50–60%
60–70%
70–80%
80–90%
Dewey
50–60%
60–70%
President before election
Franklin D. Roosevelt
Democratic
Elected President
Franklin D. Roosevelt
Democratic

The 1944 United States presidential election in Virginia took place on November 7, 1944, throughout the 48 contiguous states. Voters chose 11 representatives, or electors, to the Electoral College, who voted for president and vice president.

Virginia voted for the Democratic nominee, incumbent President Franklin D. Roosevelt, over the Republican nominee, New York Governor Thomas E. Dewey. Roosevelt ultimately won the national election with 53.39% of the vote.

This was the last election until 2020 where the Democratic candidate won Virginia by a double-digit margin. It was also the last time that the following county-equivalents voted for a Democratic presidential nominee: Augusta County, Mathews County, Northumberland County, Richmond County and Roanoke County. The independent city of Staunton did not vote Democratic again until Barack Obama in 2008.

== Results ==
United States presidential election in Virginia, 1944
Party	Candidate	Votes	Percentage	Electoral votes
Democratic	Franklin D. Roosevelt (inc.)	242,276	62.36%	11
Republican	Thomas E. Dewey	145,243	37.39%	0
Prohibition	Claude A. Watson	459	0.12%	0
Socialist	Norman Thomas	417	0.11%	0
Socialist Labor	Edward Teichert	90	0.02%	0
Totals		388,485	100.00%	11

=== Results by county ===
County or independent city	Franklin D. Roosevelt Democratic		Thomas E. Dewey Republican		Other candidates Various parties		Margin		Total votes cast
County or independent city	#	%	#	%	#	%	#	%	Total votes cast
Accomack County	1,747	62.50%	1,045	37.39%	3	0.11%	702	25.12%	2,795
Albemarle County	1,725	63.87%	964	35.69%	12	0.44%	761	28.17%	2,701
Alleghany County	1,985	60.15%	1,308	39.64%	7	0.21%	677	20.52%	3,300
Amelia County	553	64.98%	295	34.67%	3	0.35%	258	30.32%	851
Amherst County	2,585	85.06%	442	14.54%	12	0.39%	2,143	70.52%	3,039
Appomattox County	1,109	80.07%	270	19.49%	6	0.43%	839	60.58%	1,385
Arlington County	7,122	45.95%	8,317	53.66%	60	0.39%	-1,195	-7.71%	15,499
Augusta County	2,913	55.52%	2,319	44.20%	15	0.29%	594	11.32%	5,247
Bath County	581	53.35%	504	46.28%	4	0.37%	77	7.07%	1,089
Bedford County	2,534	70.23%	1,068	29.60%	6	0.17%	1,466	40.63%	3,608
Bland County	762	50.60%	744	49.40%	0	0.00%	18	1.20%	1,506
Botetourt County	1,275	49.77%	1,272	49.65%	15	0.59%	3	0.12%	2,562
Brunswick County	1,239	85.63%	208	14.37%	0	0.00%	1,031	71.25%	1,447
Buchanan County	2,826	58.81%	1,971	41.02%	8	0.17%	855	17.79%	4,805
Buckingham County	723	71.44%	286	28.26%	3	0.30%	437	43.18%	1,012
Campbell County	1,995	75.77%	634	24.08%	4	0.15%	1,361	51.69%	2,633
Caroline County	1,004	72.18%	383	27.53%	4	0.29%	621	44.64%	1,391
Carroll County	1,375	36.87%	2,352	63.07%	2	0.05%	-977	-26.20%	3,729
Charles City County	326	70.11%	139	29.89%	0	0.00%	187	40.22%	465
Charlotte County	1,473	80.49%	356	19.45%	1	0.05%	1,117	61.04%	1,830
Chesterfield County	2,860	75.82%	901	23.89%	11	0.29%	1,959	51.94%	3,772
Clarke County	816	66.02%	415	33.58%	5	0.40%	401	32.44%	1,236
Craig County	564	63.23%	327	36.66%	1	0.11%	237	26.57%	892
Culpeper County	1,022	57.64%	750	42.30%	1	0.06%	272	15.34%	1,773
Cumberland County	463	67.59%	218	31.82%	4	0.58%	245	35.77%	685
Dickenson County	2,786	61.18%	1,762	38.69%	6	0.13%	1,024	22.49%	4,554
Dinwiddie County	1,096	79.59%	279	20.26%	2	0.15%	817	59.33%	1,377
Elizabeth City County	2,563	69.20%	1,128	30.45%	13	0.35%	1,435	38.74%	3,704
Essex County	508	73.73%	179	25.98%	2	0.29%	329	47.75%	689
Fairfax County	3,582	46.75%	4,046	52.81%	34	0.44%	-464	-6.06%	7,662
Fauquier County	2,110	65.86%	1,089	33.99%	5	0.16%	1,021	31.87%	3,204
Floyd County	630	30.55%	1,424	69.06%	8	0.39%	-794	-38.51%	2,062
Fluvanna County	577	66.32%	291	33.45%	2	0.23%	286	32.87%	870
Franklin County	2,002	62.10%	1,206	37.41%	16	0.50%	796	24.69%	3,224
Frederick County	1,213	56.26%	938	43.51%	5	0.23%	275	12.76%	2,156
Giles County	1,703	58.52%	1,203	41.34%	4	0.14%	500	17.18%	2,910
Gloucester County	934	69.24%	410	30.39%	5	0.37%	524	38.84%	1,349
Goochland County	691	74.70%	230	24.86%	4	0.43%	461	49.84%	925
Grayson County	2,607	44.08%	3,298	55.77%	9	0.15%	-691	-11.68%	5,914
Greene County	282	41.72%	393	58.14%	1	0.15%	-111	-16.42%	676
Greensville County	954	77.12%	279	22.55%	4	0.32%	675	54.57%	1,237
Halifax County	3,351	86.59%	512	13.23%	7	0.18%	2,839	73.36%	3,870
Hanover County	1,471	71.72%	575	28.04%	5	0.24%	896	43.69%	2,051
Henrico County	3,056	70.56%	1,263	29.16%	12	0.28%	1,793	41.40%	4,331
Henry County	1,538	67.75%	727	32.03%	5	0.22%	811	35.73%	2,270
Highland County	535	45.49%	641	54.51%	0	0.00%	-106	-9.01%	1,176
Isle of Wight County	1,178	73.26%	430	26.74%	0	0.00%	748	46.52%	1,608
James City County	317	66.32%	161	33.68%	0	0.00%	156	32.64%	478
King and Queen County	363	68.62%	166	31.38%	0	0.00%	197	37.24%	529
King George County	348	50.43%	340	49.28%	2	0.29%	8	1.16%	690
King William County	718	71.94%	280	28.06%	0	0.00%	438	43.89%	998
Lancaster County	666	62.77%	390	36.76%	5	0.47%	276	26.01%	1,061
Lee County	4,470	53.22%	3,921	46.68%	8	0.10%	549	6.54%	8,399
Loudoun County	1,802	54.71%	1,485	45.08%	7	0.21%	317	9.62%	3,294
Louisa County	930	59.16%	634	40.33%	8	0.51%	296	18.83%	1,572
Lunenburg County	1,205	86.50%	184	13.21%	4	0.29%	1,021	73.30%	1,393
Madison County	616	43.14%	811	56.79%	1	0.07%	-195	-13.66%	1,428
Mathews County	615	55.56%	491	44.35%	1	0.09%	124	11.20%	1,107
Mecklenburg County	2,561	85.62%	430	14.38%	0	0.00%	2,131	71.25%	2,991
Middlesex County	627	76.84%	186	22.79%	3	0.37%	441	54.04%	816
Montgomery County	1,652	45.80%	1,936	53.67%	19	0.53%	-284	-7.87%	3,607
Nansemond County	1,398	79.93%	351	20.07%	0	0.00%	1,047	59.86%	1,749
Nelson County	1,390	76.42%	427	23.47%	2	0.11%	963	52.94%	1,819
New Kent County	329	67.56%	158	32.44%	0	0.00%	171	35.11%	487
Norfolk County	5,467	77.98%	1,527	21.78%	17	0.24%	3,940	56.20%	7,011
Northampton County	1,108	74.21%	381	25.52%	4	0.27%	727	48.69%	1,493
Northumberland County	695	56.92%	525	43.00%	1	0.08%	170	13.92%	1,221
Nottoway County	1,453	75.28%	472	24.46%	5	0.26%	981	50.83%	1,930
Orange County	1,199	63.24%	694	36.60%	3	0.16%	505	26.64%	1,896
Page County	1,653	39.04%	2,574	60.79%	7	0.17%	-921	-21.75%	4,234
Patrick County	1,383	65.98%	706	33.68%	7	0.33%	677	32.30%	2,096
Pittsylvania County	3,492	73.92%	1,224	25.91%	8	0.17%	2,268	48.01%	4,724
Powhatan County	461	66.43%	230	33.14%	3	0.43%	231	33.29%	694
Prince Edward County	1,063	71.25%	425	28.49%	4	0.27%	638	42.76%	1,492
Prince George County	796	72.50%	301	27.41%	1	0.09%	495	45.08%	1,098
Prince William County	1,340	63.57%	763	36.20%	5	0.24%	577	27.37%	2,108
Princess Anne County	1,959	66.34%	993	33.63%	1	0.03%	966	32.71%	2,953
Pulaski County	2,155	62.32%	1,302	37.65%	1	0.03%	853	24.67%	3,458
Rappahannock County	497	62.36%	297	37.26%	3	0.38%	200	25.09%	797
Richmond County	364	51.93%	336	47.93%	1	0.14%	28	3.99%	701
Roanoke County	3,380	51.71%	3,146	48.13%	10	0.15%	234	3.58%	6,536
Rockbridge County	1,638	62.81%	961	36.85%	9	0.35%	677	25.96%	2,608
Rockingham County	2,104	36.03%	3,714	63.61%	21	0.36%	-1,610	-27.57%	5,839
Russell County	2,945	55.05%	2,385	44.58%	20	0.37%	560	10.47%	5,350
Scott County	2,888	48.27%	3,089	51.63%	6	0.10%	-201	-3.36%	5,983
Shenandoah County	1,962	35.77%	3,517	64.12%	6	0.11%	-1,555	-28.35%	5,485
Smyth County	2,266	45.33%	2,726	54.53%	7	0.14%	-460	-9.20%	4,999
Southampton County	1,599	84.38%	284	14.99%	12	0.63%	1,315	69.39%	1,895
Spotsylvania County	744	59.47%	504	40.29%	3	0.24%	240	19.18%	1,251
Stafford County	698	49.22%	714	50.35%	6	0.42%	-16	-1.13%	1,418
Surry County	602	82.92%	123	16.94%	1	0.14%	479	65.98%	726
Sussex County	773	78.88%	201	20.51%	6	0.61%	572	58.37%	980
Tazewell County	2,832	55.23%	2,271	44.29%	25	0.49%	561	10.94%	5,128
Warren County	1,034	57.51%	761	42.32%	3	0.17%	273	15.18%	1,798
Warwick County	1,849	69.49%	807	30.33%	5	0.19%	1,042	39.16%	2,661
Washington County	2,849	50.30%	2,792	49.29%	23	0.41%	57	1.01%	5,664
Westmoreland County	808	60.12%	532	39.58%	4	0.30%	276	20.54%	1,344
Wise County	4,588	71.46%	1,817	28.30%	15	0.23%	2,771	43.16%	6,420
Wythe County	1,465	44.57%	1,822	55.43%	0	0.00%	-357	-10.86%	3,287
York County	760	69.34%	318	29.01%	18	1.64%	442	40.33%	1,096
Alexandria City	4,391	56.13%	3,405	43.53%	27	0.35%	986	12.60%	7,823
Bristol City	1,561	71.02%	628	28.57%	9	0.41%	933	42.45%	2,198
Buena Vista City	402	69.07%	179	30.76%	1	0.17%	223	38.32%	582
Charlottesville City	2,188	67.22%	1,055	32.41%	12	0.37%	1,133	34.81%	3,255
Clifton Forge City	1,082	72.04%	415	27.63%	5	0.33%	667	44.41%	1,502
Danville City	3,121	71.48%	1,231	28.20%	14	0.32%	1,890	43.29%	4,366
Fredericksburg City	1,092	60.90%	698	38.93%	3	0.17%	394	21.97%	1,793
Hampton City	987	76.69%	297	23.08%	3	0.23%	690	53.61%	1,287
Harrisonburg City	1,292	49.65%	1,302	50.04%	8	0.31%	-10	-0.38%	2,602
Hopewell City	1,284	77.49%	368	22.21%	5	0.30%	916	55.28%	1,657
Lynchburg City	4,302	64.08%	2,396	35.69%	15	0.22%	1,906	28.39%	6,713
Martinsville City	1,093	70.38%	458	29.49%	2	0.13%	635	40.89%	1,553
Newport News City	4,051	76.30%	1,237	23.30%	21	0.40%	2,814	53.00%	5,309
Norfolk City	12,010	70.66%	4,958	29.17%	28	0.16%	7,052	41.49%	16,996
Petersburg City	2,256	75.68%	719	24.12%	6	0.20%	1,537	51.56%	2,981
Portsmouth City	5,735	83.39%	1,129	16.42%	13	0.19%	4,606	66.98%	6,877
Radford City	824	57.91%	597	41.95%	2	0.14%	227	15.95%	1,423
Richmond City	22,584	71.95%	8,737	27.84%	66	0.21%	13,847	44.12%	31,387
Roanoke City	7,322	58.81%	5,095	40.92%	34	0.27%	2,227	17.89%	12,451
South Norfolk City	924	79.11%	241	20.63%	3	0.26%	683	58.48%	1,168
Staunton City	1,159	57.60%	847	42.10%	6	0.30%	312	15.51%	2,012
Suffolk City	1,342	70.11%	569	29.73%	3	0.16%	773	40.39%	1,914
Williamsburg City	454	67.66%	211	31.45%	6	0.89%	243	36.21%	671
Winchester City	1,000	47.57%	1,095	52.09%	7	0.33%	-95	-4.52%	2,102
Totals	242,276	62.36%	145,243	37.39%	966	0.25%	97,033	24.98%	388,485

==== Counties and independent cities that flipped from Democratic to Republican ====
- Arlington
- Fairfax
- Greene
- Harrisonburg City
- Madison
- Montgomery
- Smyth
- Stafford
- Winchester City
- Wythe
