= Franklin County Schools (Virginia) =

Virginia school system

Franklin County Public Schools

Address
- 25 Bernard Rd Rocky Mount, Virginia, 20111; United States

District information
- Type: Public
- Grades: Pre-K through 12
- Superintendent: Dr. Kevin Siers
- School board: 8 members 2 student representatives
- Chair of the board: Dawn McCray
- Governing agency: Virginia Department of Education
- Schools: 14

Students and staff
- Students: 6,109 (2024-25)

Other information
- Website: www.frco.k12.va.us

Franklin County Public Schools is a school division headquartered in Rocky Mount, Virginia, United States. The school district serves students in Franklin County, Virginia, and administers 14 schools: 10 elementary schools, 1 middle school, and 1 high school.

== History ==
Franklin County Public Schools began in 1870 with the establishment of the statewide public school system. The district's first superintendent was Thomas Hill Bernard. In the first Superintendent Report for the state, Bernard stated there was much hostility toward public schools in the county.

=== All black schools & desegregation ===
There were about 40 all-black schools in Franklin County. In the early 1900s, Franklin County established a school for African Americans called the Franklin County Training School. The school was originally opened with one story and 4 rooms. By 1915, a twenty-room dormitory was built for the students and faculty. The school was then renamed the Booker T. Washington Franklin Normal and Industrial Academy, serving students until junior high school. By 1926, the Rosenwald Fund donated money for the building of another 4-room building, which became the new Franklin County Training School. The school was renamed Lee M. Waid High School in 1959 (Waid helped dedicate the first school).

Originally, Franklin County Public Schools was ordered to desegregate under the Civil Rights Act of 1964. However, they chose to only desegregate first, eighth, 10th, and 12th grades on a “freedom of choice” basis. The plan didn't last long; in 1966, the district faced government pressure to desegregate. So, district officials put a plan in place to gradually desegregate by 1968.

=== Present day ===
Today, the district operates 10 schools and serves over 6,000 students.

== Former Superintendents ==
=== Early superintendents ===
Thomas Hill Bernard was the first superintendent of Franklin County Public Schools. He served from 1870 to 1872. Before his appointment, he served in the Confederate Army with the Virginia Volunteers in Company F of the 57th Infantry Regiment. After his resignation, he served as a justice of the peace in Franklin County from 1879 to 1883.

William A. Griffith served as the second superintendent from 1872 to 1876.

William E. Duncan served as superintendent of Franklin County Public Schools from 1876 to 1880 and again from 1886 to 1889. Before he was appointed superintendent, he operated a private school in Hale's Ford, Virginia. During his terms, he was responsible for organizing teacher training institutes in Franklin and surrounding counties.

=== 20th century to present day ===
Harold W. Ramsey served as the superintendent of Franklin County Public Schools from 1927 to 1968. Prior to his appointment, he was a teacher and principal in the county. He was appointed superintendent at 25. Ramsey oversaw the integration of Franklin County Public Schools.

Cyrus I. Dillon was the superintendent from 1968 to 1984. Before his appointment he was the Principal at Rocky Mount Elementary and the athletic director at Franklin County High School. During his sixteen-year term, he oversaw several facility additions, helped complete the desegregation process, and curriculum development.

Dr. Charles Lackey served as the superintendent of Franklin County Public Schools from 2006 to 2012. Before his appointment, he was the superintendent of Laurens County School District 56 and Middlesex County Public Schools. Lackey was fired by the school board in 2012 after highly publicized controversies involving school funding.

Dr. W. Mark Church served as superintendent from 2012 to 2020. Before his appointment, he was interim superintendent and served twelve years as the district's Career and Technical Education (CTE) Director.

Dr. Berniece Cobbs served as the superintendent of Franklin County Public Schools from 2020 to 2023. Prior to her appointment, she was the assistant principal at Franklin County High School. She was the first black woman to hold the position.

== Administration ==
=== Superintendent ===
The Superintendent of Franklin County Public Schools is Dr. Kevin Siers. Before his in 2023, Siers was the superintendent of Pulaski County Public Schools.

=== School board members ===
There are currently eight elected seats and 2 student representatives on the Franklin County Public School Board. The members are as follows:

- At-large: Kevin David
- Blackwater District: Arlet Greer
- Blue Ridge District: Jonathan Holley
- Boone District: Dawn McCray, Chair
- Gills Creek: Rebekah Slocum
- Rocky Mount: Jeff Worley, Vice Chair
- Snow Creek: Carletta Whiting
- Union Hall District: Danny Agee
- Nicholas Guilliams, Student Representative
- Maeve Shanahan, Student Representative
- Mandy Burnette, Board Clerk

== Schools ==
There are 12 Schools operated by Franklin County Public Schools (10 elementary, 1 middle, 1 high). All of the schools are fully accredited.

=== Secondary schools ===
- Franklin County High School
- Benjamin Franklin Middle School

=== Elementary schools ===
- Boones Mill Elementary
- Callaway Elementary
- Dudley Elementary
- Ferrum Elementary
- Glade Hill Elementary
- Lee M. Waid Elementary
- Rocky Mount Elementary
- Snow Creek Elementary
- Sontag Elementary
- Windy Gap Elementary
