= Roanoke Valley =

Valley in Virginia, United States

Coordinates: 37.266°N 79.933°W

The Roanoke Valley (/ˈroʊ.əˌnoʊk/ ROH-ə-nohk) in southwest Virginia is an area adjacent to and including the Roanoke River between the Blue Ridge Mountains to the east and the Appalachian Plateau to the west. The valley includes much of Roanoke County, as well as the two independent cities of Roanoke and Salem.

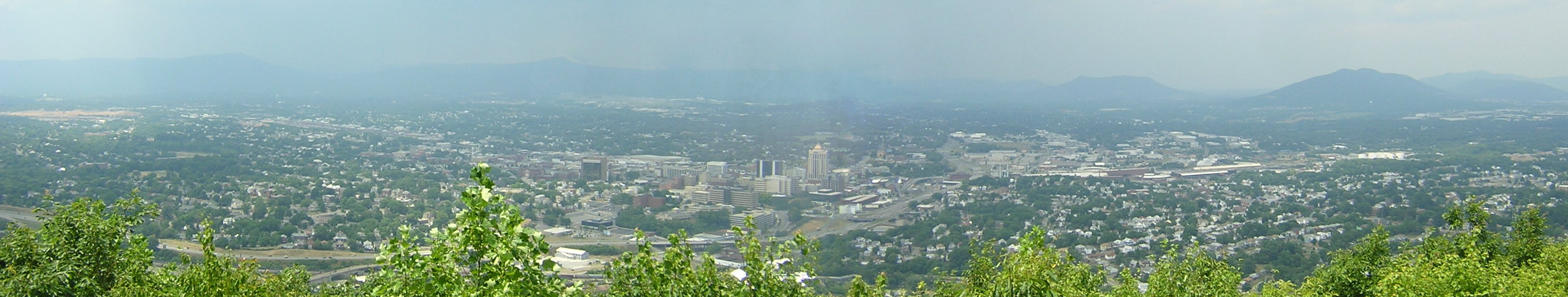
The Roanoke Valley

== Boundaries ==
The Roanoke Valley is about twenty miles (32 km) long, from the Roanoke River gorge near Virginia's Explore Park in the east to Shawsville in the west, and as much as ten miles (16 km) wide around Roanoke City though the width is closer to five miles (8.0 km) in most areas. The Roanoke Valley is part of the valley and ridge province of Virginia, which also includes the Shenandoah Valley to the northeast and the New River Valley to the southwest. The Roanoke Valley is bound to the west by a ridgeline commonly known as Christiansburg Mountain, to the north by a ridgeline formed by Fort Lewis Mountain and Brushy Mountain, and to the southwest by a ridgeline formed by Poor Mountain and adjacent peaks in the Blue Ridge, which also forms the east and southeast boundaries of the valley. However, this area generally features isolated peaks and wide gaps, with the notable exception of the aforementioned gorge, instead of continuous ridgelines. Historically, the Roanoke Valley was an important fork on the Great Wagon Road, with one branch leading to the Carolina Piedmont region and the other branch, the Wilderness Road, leading to Tennessee and Kentucky.

== Roanoke MSA ==
The Roanoke Valley is sometimes synonymous with the Roanoke Metropolitan Statistical Area, which is made up of the political subdivisions of Roanoke City, Salem, Roanoke County, Botetourt County, Franklin County, and Craig County. Adjacent communities such as western Bedford County (part of the Lynchburg MSA) and eastern Montgomery County (part of the New River Valley MSA) are also often considered parts of the Roanoke Valley. More frequently, the Roanoke Valley refers to the core urban and suburban areas, generally Roanoke City, Salem, Roanoke County within the geographic Roanoke Valley, and southern Botetourt County; however, areas of Franklin County and Bedford County near Smith Mountain Lake are becoming increasingly suburban.

== Politics ==
In a political context, the Roanoke Valley usually refers collectively to Roanoke City, Salem, and Roanoke County. Some governmental functions are consolidated. For example, there is a regional sewer authority, a regional library system, and the Roanoke Regional Airport is governed by a regional commission. Salem has traditionally been more reluctant to participate in these efforts, while Botetourt County's participation has grown, most recently joining the water and sewer authority and regional greenway commission. Whether more functions should be provided on a consolidated basis, or if the governments should be consolidated, is an often discussed issue. Consolidation referendums in 1969 and 1990 failed because of the opposition of voters in Roanoke County. The issue has remained dormant since the 1990 referendum.

== Education ==
The city of Roanoke hosts the main campus of Virginia Western Community College, part of the Virginia Community College System. There are currently three, four-year institutions of higher learning in the valley:

- Ferrum College - Ferrum
- Hollins University - Roanoke/Cloverdale
- Roanoke College - Salem

In addition, there are 12 public high schools in the Roanoke Valley. They are:

- Cave Spring High School, Roanoke (Roanoke County)
- Craig County High School, New Castle (Craig County)
- Franklin County High School, Rocky Mount (Franklin County)
- Glenvar High School, Salem (Roanoke County)
- Hidden Valley High School, Roanoke (Roanoke County)
- James River High School, Springwood (Botetourt County)
- Lord Botetourt High School, Daleville (Botetourt County)
- Northside High School, Roanoke (Roanoke County)
- Patrick Henry High School, Roanoke (Roanoke City)
- Salem High School, Salem (Salem City)
- William Byrd High School, Vinton, (Roanoke County)
- William Fleming High School, Roanoke (Roanoke City)

== Professional sports ==
As of 2025, two professional sports teams play in the Roanoke Valley:

- Roanoke Rail Yard Dawgs (Roanoke): Members of the Southern Professional Hockey League since 2016
- Salem RidgeYaks (Salem): Members of the Carolina League under various names since 1968. The Minor League Baseball A-Advance affiliate of the Boston Red Sox since 2009.

== Trivia ==
The Roanoke Valley contains the lowest point above sea level in the mountains of southwest Virginia. As a result, the Norfolk and Western Railway chose the valley as its primary route between the ports of Hampton Roads in eastern Virginia and the coal fields of southwest Virginia, West Virginia, and Kentucky. The Norfolk and Western was headquartered in Roanoke for nearly a century before merging with the Southern Railway; the newly merged Norfolk Southern's corporate headquarters moved to Norfolk. The railroad has remained a major employer in the valley, though major layoffs were recently announced.
