= Northside High School (Roanoke, Virginia) =

Coordinates: 37.328593°N 79.998764°W

Location
- 6758 Northside High School Road; Roanoke, Virginia 24019; United States

Information
- School type: Public, high school
- Established: 1960
- School district: Roanoke County Public Schools
- Superintendent: Dr. Jamie Soltis
- Principal: Dr. Leanna Rippey
- Staff: 61.51 (FTE)
- Grades: 9-12
- Enrollment: 919 (2024-25)
- Student to teacher ratio: 14.94
- Language: English
- Colors: Green, White, Black,Gold
- Athletics conference: Blue Ridge District; Region III
- Nickname: Vikings
- Rival: William Byrd High School; Lord Botetourt High School; Salem High School; William Fleming High School; Cave Spring High School
- Website: Official Site

Northside High School is one of five high schools in Roanoke County, Virginia. For the 2024-2025 school year, Northside enrolled 919 students. Northside is the most racially diverse public high school in Roanoke County.

== Location and history ==
Northside High School (NHS or Northside), located in the northern area of Roanoke County, Virginia, opened in December 1960.

When the school opened, it enrolled students in grades seven through ten. Its initial student body was formed from portions of those grade levels previously assigned to William Byrd High School in Vinton and the former Andrew Lewis High School in Salem.

Northside did not initially include junior or senior classes, allowing those students to graduate from the schools they had previously attended. By the 1962–63 school year, Northside enrolled students in grades eight through twelve, with its first senior class entering that fall. The school's first graduating class received diplomas in the spring of 1963.

When Northside Intermediate School opened in 1970, eighth-grade students who would have attended Northside High School were reassigned there, leaving NHS with students in grades nine through twelve. In 1973, the school was reorganized as Northside Junior High School, and ninth-grade students were also reassigned there, making NHS a senior high school, serving grades ten through twelve.

In 1977, the Roanoke City annexation of parts of Roanoke County reduce Northside's enrollment by transferring a portion of its attendance area to the city's school system. Since then, enrollment has remained relatively stable despite population changes, school construction, and periodic redistricting, with graduating classes typically containing between 240 and 270 students.

In 1994, Northside Junior High School was reorganized as Northside Middle School (NMS), returning to a middle-school model. At the same time, NHS adopted its current grade configuration, serving students in grades nine through twelve. Students from Glen Cove, Burlington, and Mountain View elementary schools attend NMS prior to enrolling at NHS.

Between 2007 and 2009, NHS underwent a major renovation and expansion to modernize its facilities. The school shares a campus with NMS and includes Hickam Field at Viking Stadium, a basketball stadium, a softball complex, and a gymnasium.

== Athletics ==
Northside High School is a member of the Virginia High School League and currently competes in the Blue Ridge District and previously competed in the Roanoke Valley District before being reclassified in 1988.

Northside has won VHSL state championships in golf (1995), softball (2010), baseball (2011), football (2009, 2013), and boys' indoor and outdoor track-and-field relay events (2013). The school's wrestling program won three state championships during the VHSL's unclassified era between 1967 and 1970, and captured the Region III championship in 2008. Northside has also produced state runner-up finishes in boys' basketball, girls' basketball, and wrestling.

The baseball team reached the VHSL state-semifinals in 2006 and 2007 before winning its first state championship in 2011. The boys' soccer team won district championships in 2006, 2007, 2018, and 2019, along with regional championships in 2018 and 2019. The girls' soccer team won district titles in 2005 and 2006. The football team's 2009 state championship win against Bruton High School was the first in the school's history and the first football state title won by a Roanoke County public high school since the establishment of the VHSL play-off system. It was marked the first appearance by a Roanoke County public high school in the football championship game since Andrew Lewis lost to T.C. Williams in 1971, portrayed in the 2000 movie Remember the Titans.

In 2008, Northside High School became the first team in AA Blue Ridge District to use Nike uniforms based on the uniforms of the Oregon Ducks.

== Extracurricular activities ==
Northside High School is home to the Northside Vocal Music Department, under the direction of Ashley Galyen, and The Pride of Northside marching band, under the direction of Tim Galyen. Northside is also home to the Viking Playhouse, which features a two-show season; a one-act play in the fall, and either a two-act play or musical in the spring.

== Controversies ==
=== Fellowship of Christian Athletes ===
For several years, Northside's former head football coach, Burt Torrence, permitted representatives of the Fellowship of Christian Athletes (FCA) to attend football practices. During some practices, FCA volunteers participated in an activity known as "Watermelon Ministry," in which they distributed watermelon to players and delivered a Christian message. Torrence has explained that he "remembers vividly the FCA being an integral part of our school system . . . especially here in Roanoke, Virginia." In 2015, the practice received public scrutiny over concerns that it violated constitutional restrictions on religious activities in public schools.

In September 2015, Roanoke City and Roanoke County public school officials announced that the practice had been discontinued and stated that coaches and staff had been reminded of the district policies governing religious activities.

=== Embezzlement charges ===
In late 2016, Torrence, was indicted by the Roanoke County Grand Jury and charged with four felony counts of embezzlement of public funds, four felony counts of embezzlement, and four felony counts of obtaining money by false pretenses. Torrence, Northside's long-time football coach, led Northside to state football championships in 2009 and 2013, but resigned in mid-April 2016 after publicly admitting to receiving an outdoor-track coaching stipend for several years despite not coaching the outdoor-track team. The charges were dropped in 2017, with the Roanoke County Commonwealth's Attorney's Office noting that Torrence had cooperated with investigators and paid around $7,900 in restitution to Roanoke County.

=== Sexual misconduct allegations and litigation ===
In March 2022, two former Northside students filed a $19-million-dollar federal lawsuit against the Roanoke County School Board, several current and former school administrators, and the school's former information-technology specialist and soccer and wrestling coach, Lorstan Allen. The lawsuit alleged that Allen engaged in grooming, sexual harassment, and sexual abuse of female students between 2015 and 2021, and that school officials violated Title IX by failing to adequately respond, despite having knowledge of his alleged misconduct. According to school board records, Allen's employment was terminated in November 2021.

In June 2022, three additional former students joined the lawsuit. The amended complaint alleged that Allen engaged in similar conduct involving multiple female students over several years and that school officials failed to intervene despite repeated warning signs.

In March 2023, the United States District Court for the Western District of Virginia dismissed some of the lawsuit's claims, but allowed others, including portions of the plaintiffs' Title IX and constitutional claims against the school board and several administrators, to proceed. The case settled with undisclosed terms and no admission of liability in April 2024.

== Notable alumni ==
- Jimmy Allen, basketball coach
- Rich Anderson, politician
- Carlos Basham Jr., football player
- Carolyn Bourdeaux, U.S. Representative from Georgia's 7th congressional district since 2021
- Lily Franklin, member of Virginia House of Delegates from Virginia's 41st district since 2026
- Bernie Harris, basketball player
- Diana B. Henriques, financial journalist and author
- Alex Huynh, martial artist and stunt man
- Jim Harrell, professional wrestler
- Tommy Lee James, country music songwriter and record producer
- Danny Karbassiyoon, soccer player
- Daniel Pereira, soccer player
