= Dixie Caverns =

Cave in Virginia, United States

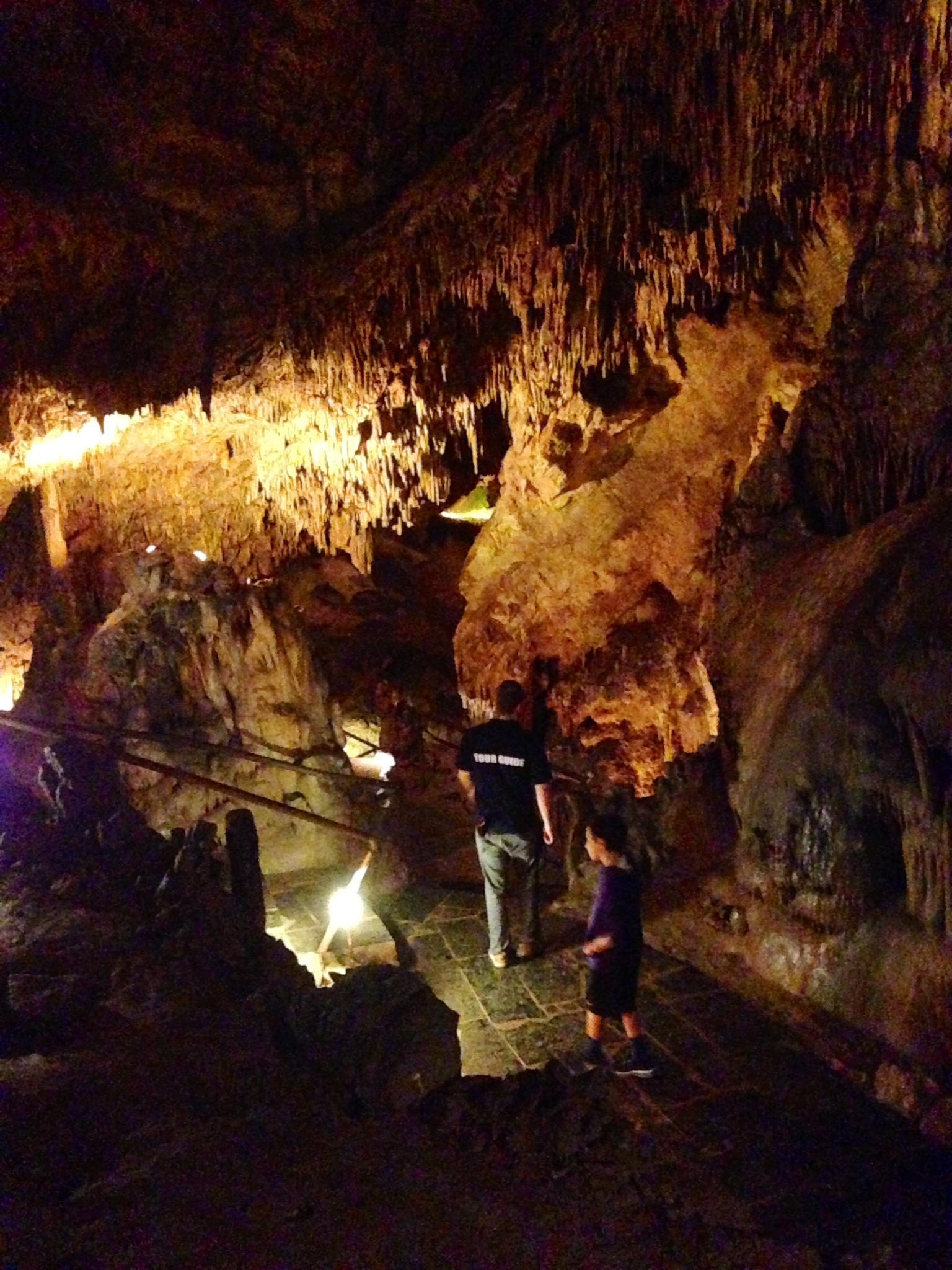
- Cathedral Room at Dixie Caverns

- Location within Shenandoah Valley Location within Virginia Location within the United States
- Type: Natural Area
- Coordinates: 37.2523°N 80.1751°W
- Opened: 1923

Dixie Caverns is a commercial show cave located in the Riverside community of Roanoke County, Virginia, USA, four miles west of Salem. The cave is a limestone solution cave.

== Description and access ==
Visitors may explore the caverns in a 45-minute guided tour. The caverns were discovered in the 1860s. Guided tours of the caverns were begun in 1923. The best-known attraction is a bell-shaped flowstone formation known as the "Wedding Bell". Weddings have been held under the Bell.
