= Vinton, Virginia =

- Town
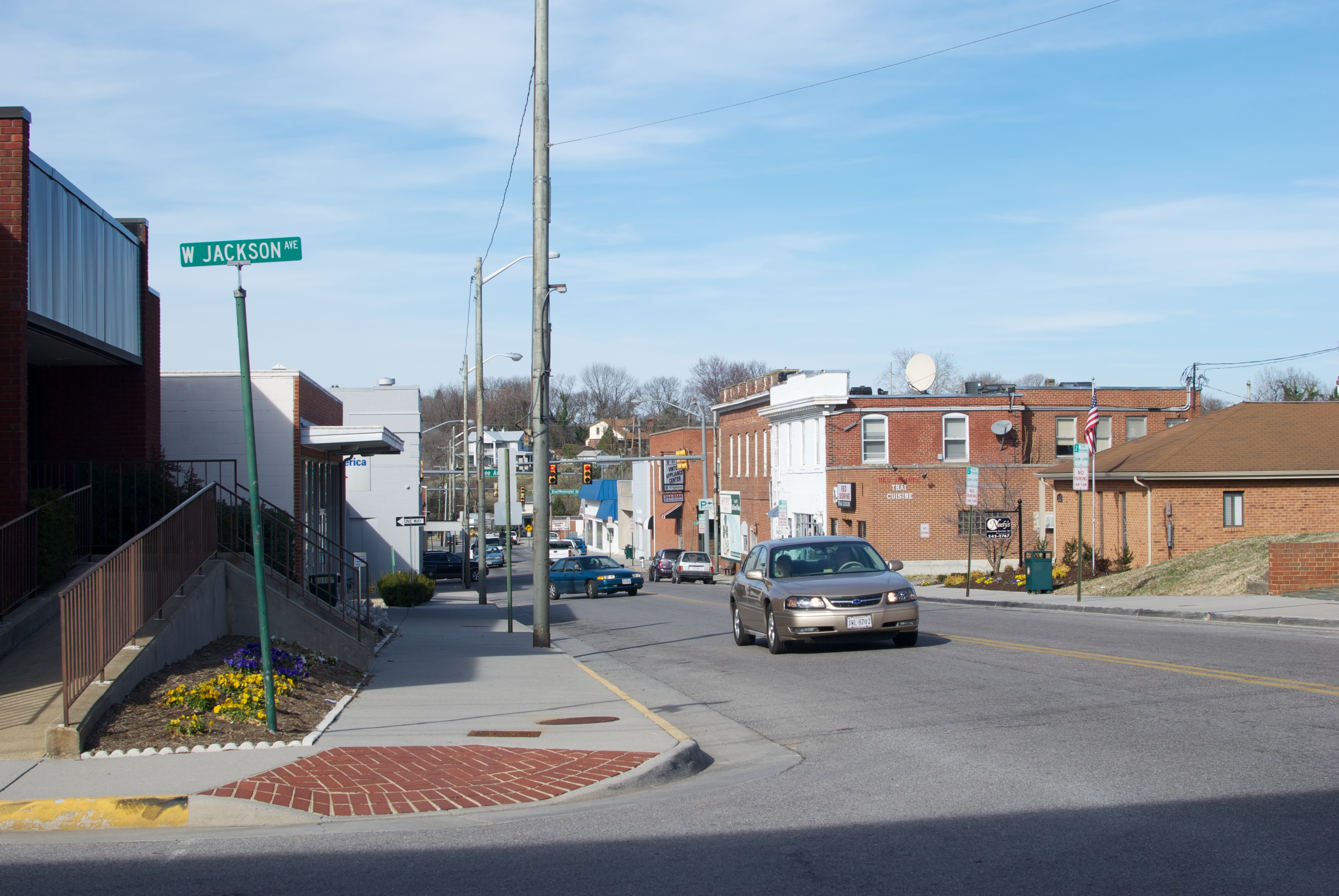
- Downtown Vinton

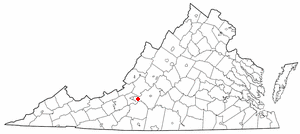
- Location in Virginia
- Coordinates: 37°16′41″N 79°53′43″W
- Country: United States
- State: Virginia
- County: Roanoke
- Founded: 1884

Government
  - Mayor: Bradley E. Grose

Area
  - Total: 3.15 sq mi (8.2 km^{2})
  - Land: 3.11 sq mi (8.1 km^{2})
  - Water: 0.04 sq mi (0.10 km^{2})
- Elevation: 925 ft (282 m)

Population (2020)
  - Total: 8,059
  - Density: 2,590/sq mi (1,000/km^{2})
- Time zone: UTC−5 (Eastern (EST))
  - Summer (DST): UTC−4 (EDT)
- ZIP Code: 24179
- Area codes: 540 and 826
- FIPS code: 51-81280
- GNIS feature ID: 1500260
- Website: www.vintonva.gov

Vinton is a town in eastern Roanoke County, Virginia, United States. The population was 8,059 at the 2020 census. Vinton is part of the Roanoke metropolitan area and the Roanoke Region of Virginia.

== History ==
By the late 18th century, settlers began moving into the area and in 1797, the Gish family established a gristmill on Glade Creek. Afterward the area would become known as Gish's Mill. As the railroad expanded into the Roanoke Valley, Gish's Mill became a stop for the Atlantic, Mississippi and Ohio Railroad. In the late 1870s and early 1880s, the Gish family led a movement to establish a town around the train depot site. A mass meeting to discuss incorporation was held in 1883 and in 1884 the area was incorporated as the Town of Vinton.

== Geography ==
Vinton is located at 37°16′41″N 79°53′43″W (37.277987, −79.895248).

According to the United States Census Bureau, the town has a total area of 3.16 square miles (8.2 km^{2}).

The town shares a substantial portion of its western border with the neighboring city of Roanoke. Several neighborhoods in this area are bisected by the border between the two communities. Given its proximity and size, the town is considered a bedroom community for Roanoke.

The southern border of Vinton consists of 1.5 miles (2.4 km) of lakefront in the Roanoke River Gorge. This lake, however, which was created by the 1904 construction of the hydroelectric Niagara (so-called) dam, is not visible from any inhabited part of the town, is difficult to reach, and is little used.

Vinton has varied topography, considering its 3.2 square mile size. The above-mentioned lake is at an elevation of 890 feet (270 m) above sea level. The Vinton side of the lake consists of a steep, wooded cliff 150 feet (46 m) in vertical height. Vinton's highest point is on Olney Road, at an elevation of 1,265 feet (386 m), which affords a good view of the adjacent city of Roanoke.

While the entirety of the town of Vinton is located in Roanoke County, much of its ZIP Code also covers the western portion of Bedford County.

== Demographics ==
Historical population
Census	Pop.	Note	%±
1890	1,057		—
1900	1,438		36.0%
1910	1,928		34.1%
1920	2,779		44.1%
1930	3,610		29.9%
1940	3,455		−4.3%
1950	3,629		5.0%
1960	3,432		−5.4%
1970	6,347		84.9%
1980	8,027		26.5%
1990	7,665		−4.5%
2000	7,782		1.5%
2010	8,098		4.1%
2020	8,059		−0.5%
U.S. Decennial Census

=== 2020 census ===
As of the census of 2020, there were 8,059 people residing in the town. There were 3,774 housing units. The racial makeup of the town was 83.6% White, 7.2% African American or Black, 0.2% American Indian, 1.2% Asian, 0.0% Pacific Islander, 1.4% from other races, and 6.4% from two or more races. Hispanic or Latino of any race were 3.6% of the population.

=== 2010 census ===
As of the census of 2010, there were 8,092 people, 3,774 housing units, and 3,547 households in the town. The racial makeup of the town was 90.0% White, 5.6% African American, 0.1% Native American, 1.0% Asian, 0.0% Pacific Islander, 1.3% from other races, and 2.0% from two or more races. Hispanic or Latino of any race were 2.8% of the population. The median income for a household in the town was $44,667.

== Parks and recreation ==
Vinyard Park is an 86-acre public park located just north of Vinton. The park includes fields for baseball, football and soccer, a playground area and picnic shelter. A wooden path near the park entrance provides an educational lookout in a wetlands area.

Goode Park is a public park located east of Vinton. The park includes a baseball/softball field, a soccer field, trails, and picnic area.

M. A. Banks Park is a neighborhood park that includes a basketball court, picnic area, and playground.

== Dogwood Festival ==
The Vinton Dogwood Festival is an annual festival held in the spring celebrating the blossoming of the American Dogwood, which is both the state flower and state tree of Virginia. At festival time, the streets of downtown Vinton are filled with craft and food vendors and activities such as a petting zoo, an antique car show, and strongman demos. There are live music performances throughout the town featuring school jazz bands as well as other local performers playing bluegrass, country, and rock music.

The festival features a parade including members of the Vinton Town Council; the annually crowned "Dogwood Queen" (a senior from William Byrd High School); marching bands and cheerleaders from local high schools; bagpipers; baton twirlers. The festival originated in 1956 as a fundraiser for the high school's marching band. In April 2025, the town celebrated its 70th anniversary of the festival.

== Government ==
Vinton operates a council–manager form of government. Vinton Town Council is composed of a mayor and four council members who are elected at-large.

== Education ==
The town is served by Roanoke County Public Schools. Public school students residing in Vinton are zoned to attend Herman L. Horn Elementary School or W. E. Cundiff Elementary School, William Byrd Middle School, and William Byrd High School.

Higher education institutions are located in Hollins and Roanoke.

== Media ==
The Vinton Messenger is a weekly newspaper that covers the town of Vinton. The Roanoke Times, the region's primary newspaper, also covers the town.

== Infrastructure ==
=== Transportation ===
==== Air ====
The Roanoke-Blacksburg Regional Airport is the closest airport with commercial service to the town.

==== Roads ====
- Virginia State Route 24
- Virginia State Route 634

==== Rail ====
The Norfolk Southern operated Blue Ridge District and Altavista District run through the town. The closest passenger rail service is located in Roanoke.

=== Public safety ===
Law enforcement is provided by the Vinton Police Department. Fire protection is provided by the Vinton Volunteer Fire Department and Roanoke County Fire & Rescue Department which operates a fire station within the town. Emergency medical services are provided by the Vinton First Aid Crew and Roanoke County Fire & Rescue Department.

== Notable people ==
- Henry Brabham, hockey executive, former mayor of Vinton
- David R. Goode, railroad executive
- Nidal Hasan, perpetrator in the 2009 Fort Hood shooting, spent much of his academic life in Vinton during the 1980s and 1990s
- David Huddleston, actor
- Mike McGuire, Head Women's Basketball Coach at Radford University
