= Wabun, Virginia =

- Unincorporated community
- Location within the Commonwealth of Virginia Wabun, Virginia (the United States)
- Coordinates: 37°14′56″N 80°08′29″W
- Country: United States
- State: Virginia
- County: Roanoke
- Elevation: 1,099 ft (335 m)
- Time zone: UTC−5 (Eastern (EST))
  - Summer (DST): UTC−4 (EDT)
- ZIP code: 24153
- Area code: 540
- GNIS feature ID: 1494287

Wabun is an unincorporated community in western Roanoke County, Virginia, United States. The community lies along the Roanoke River and near the base of Poor Mountain.
