= Floyd County High School =

Location
- 721 Baker Street; Floyd, Virginia 24091; United States
- Coordinates: 36°54′27.4″N 80°18′38.7″W

Information
- School type: Public, high school
- Founded: 1962
- School district: Floyd County Schools
- Superintendent: Jessica Cromer
- Principal: Barry Hollandsworth
- Grades: 8-12
- Enrollment: 770 (2021-22)
- Colors: Black and Gold
- Athletics: Baseball, Basketball, Cheerleading, Cross-Country, Football, Golf, Soccer, Softball, Tennis, Track, Volleyball, Wrestling
- Athletics conference: Class 2 Three Rivers District; Class 2 Region C
- Mascot: Buffalo
- Website: fchs.floyd.k12.va.us

== History ==
Floyd County High School was built in 1962, a product of a county-wide movement to consolidate the three high schools in Floyd County using funding from both the federal government and the Commonwealth of Virginia. Originally, there were separate high schools in Willis, Floyd, and Check. Floyd County High School was previously located on the current site of Floyd Elementary School. Before that, it was located in the building which now houses Schoolhouse Fabrics. The first class of FCHS graduated in 1963. The school celebrated its 50th anniversary with the graduation of the Class of 2012.

== Vocational school ==
In the 1970s, funds from the Appalachian Regional Development Act were used to construct a separate vocational school on the Floyd County High School campus. This school currently houses auto-mechanics, welding, computer technology and home economics classes.

== Athletics ==
Floyd County High School's mascot is the Buffalo. They play in the VHSL Class 2 Region C and are a member of the Three Rivers District.

Floyd County won the VHSL Class A boys outdoor track state championship in 2000.

Floyd County won the group A state championship for boys golf in 1985, 2000, 2001, 2006, 2007.

Floyd County won the group A state championship for girls cross-country in 2003.

Floyd County won the group A state championship for girls basketball in 1993, 1994, 2008, 2013 and boys basketball group A state championship in 1997. Retired girls basketball coach Alan Cantrell currently holds the state record for most wins at 749.

Floyd County finished as Class A Division 2 state runner-up in football in 1999, 2001 and 2008. Former boys head football coach, Winfred Beale, coached the football team from 1981 until 2023 for a total of 43 years.

The FCHS Golf team won the state championship back to back in 2006 and 2007.

== Extracurricular Activities ==
The FCA hosts an annual Spring Fling.

The FCHS Forensics Team won the Three-Rivers District Championship for thirty-eight years straight.

The FCHS Chorus performs a Madrigal dinner and Musical every school year. Previous musicals have included The Secret Garden, The Butler Did It Singing, Once Upon a Mattress, Oklahoma!, South Pacific, The Mystery of Edwin Drood, and How to Succeed in Business Without Really Trying.
