= Glenvar High School =

Location
- 4549 Malus Drive; Salem, Virginia 24153; United States; 37°16′47.97″N 80°8′18″W

Information
- School type: Public, high school
- Established: 1966
- School district: Roanoke County Public Schools
- Superintendent: Ken Nicely
- Principal: Corie Franklin
- Staff: 49.13 (FTE)
- Grades: 9–12
- Enrollment: 585 (2017-18)
- Student to teacher ratio: 11.91
- Language: English
- Colors: Green and Gold
- Athletics conference: Three Rivers District; A Region C Virginia High School League
- Nickname: Highlanders
- Publication: The Bagpipe
- Newspaper: Thistle
- Yearbook: Crusader
- Website: ghs.rcps.us

Glenvar High School is a public high school in Roanoke County, Virginia, United States. It is one of the five high schools for the Roanoke County public school system. Glenvar High School serves the western end of Roanoke County and is located in the community of Glenvar, which is immediately west of Salem, Virginia.

== History ==
Glenvar High School was opened in 1966 by Roanoke County public schools. Most, if not all, of the student body would previously have attended Andrew Lewis High School in Salem. However, the student bodies of Glenvar and Andrew Lewis were consolidated into the new Salem High School for the 1977–1978 school year. The former high schools became junior high schools.

Beginning with the 1982–1983 school year, the city of Salem established an independent school district and enrollment in Salem High School was limited to students from the city. Glenvar High School was reopened to serve western Roanoke County. The school housed grades 7 through 12 until a new building was constructed for Glenvar Middle School in 1996.

== Academics ==
Glenvar High School is a comprehensive high school which includes grades 9–12 with a student enrollment of 650. The school offers courses in multiple academic disciplines including Advanced Placement and Dual Enrollment courses. Specialized vocational education is available at the Arnold R. Burton Technology Center in Salem. Pass rates for Virginia's Standards of Learning tests average over 90%, which makes the school fully accredited.

The earth science and ecology students of Glenvar High School raise some of the brook trout hatchlings from Paint Bank, Virginia, which survive at a rate of 10 per cent, rather than the 1 to 3 percent that survive in the wild. They are released in the Roaring Run creek in Botetourt County, Virginia.

== Athletics and extracurriculars ==
Glenvar High School is a member of the Virginia High School League and competes in the A Three Rivers District. Glenvar competed in Group AA (called Group IB before 1971) when it was opened but dropped down to Group A shortly after it reopened. Glenvar has enjoyed success in athletics through its history. Glenvar captured Group AA state championships in football, men's basketball, men's outdoor track, and wrestling. Glenvar has won Group A state championships in women's soccer, baseball, men's basketball, women's basketball, golf, women's softball, wrestling, volleyball, and men's tennis. Glenvar won the Wachovia Cup, the VHSL's award for overall athletic excellence, in Group A for the 1993–1994 school year.

Coach Richard "Dickie" Myers spent over forty years coaching wrestling, cross country, and track. He was the wrestling head coach for the 1971 and 1972 state championship teams and coached many individual state champions in wrestling and track. Tracy Barnett, under the coaching of Dickie Myers, won a state championship in 1987. Jamie Soltis, principal of Glenvar High School for the 2017-2018 school year, was one of Myers' products in wrestling and track. Soltis won two state titles in wrestling at 103 and 112 pounds. Soltis also won state championships in track and cross country under the coaching of Myers.

== Notable alumni ==
- Ross Copperman, Grammy-nominated American singer-songwriter and producer (Class of 2001)
- Andrew Strelka, American attorney who has served in both the Obama-Biden White House and the Biden-Harris White House (Class of 1998)
