= Arnold R. Burton Technology Center =

Vocational school in Virginia

The Burton Center for Arts and Technology is a vocational school that offers courses designed to prepare students for immediate work force entry post high school, to specialized programs and adult education.

Located in Salem, Virginia, the Burton Center serves the Roanoke County, Virginia, area and its public high schools.

== Classes ==
Classes at the Burton Center are divided into five categories: Associate Degree Technicians, College Bound, Work Force Entry, Specialized Programs, and Adult Education. Most courses are cumulative and build upon a previous one.
