= William Byrd High School =

Location
- 2902 E. Washington Avenue; Vinton, Virginia 24179; United States; 37.284°N 79.858°W

Information
- Type: Public
- Established: 1933
- School district: Roanoke County Public Schools
- Principal: Evan Noell
- Faculty: 81.59 (FTE)
- Grades: 9 to 12
- Enrollment: 1,107 (2022-23)
- Student to teacher ratio: 13.57
- Color: Maroon Orange White
- Nickname: Terriers
- Rivals: Lord Botetourt High School; Staunton River High School; Northside High School; Hidden Valley High School
- Yearbook: The Black Swan
- Website: www.rcps.us/WBHS

William Byrd High School is a public secondary school located in Vinton, Virginia and is part of the Roanoke County Public Schools system. The school has many successful athletic programs as well as award-winning band, choir, theater, forensics, and scholastic bowl programs.

== Feeder Pattern ==
Elementary schools:

- Bonsack Elementary
- Herman L. Horn Elementary
- Mount Pleasant Elementary
- W. E. Cundiff Elementary

Middle school:

- William Byrd Middle School

== Award Winning Marching Band ==
Directed by Dan Plybon is the award winning William Byrd Marching Band.

== Athletics ==
=== Teams ===
- Baseball
- Boys Basketball
- Girls Basketball
- Cheerleading (Competition & Sideline)
- Boys Cross Country
- Girls Cross Country
- Football
- Golf
- Boys Indoor Track & Field
- Girls Indoor Track & Field
- Boys Lacrosse
- Girls Lacrosse
- Boys Outdoor Track & Field
- Girls Outdoor Track & Field
- Boys Soccer
- Girls Soccer
- Softball
- Boys Swimming & Diving
- Girls Swimming & Diving
- Boys Tennis
- Girls Tennis
- Volleyball
- Wrestling

=== State Championships ===
Baseball: 1997

Boys Cross Country: 1987

Boys Outdoor Track & Field: 1988

Competition Cheer: 2002, 2003, 2005, 2006, 2008

Girls Basketball: 1980, 1997

Golf: 1992, 1997

Softball: 2019

Volleyball: 2000

Wrestling: 1973, 1974, 1982
