= Roanoke County, Virginia =

County in the United States

- County
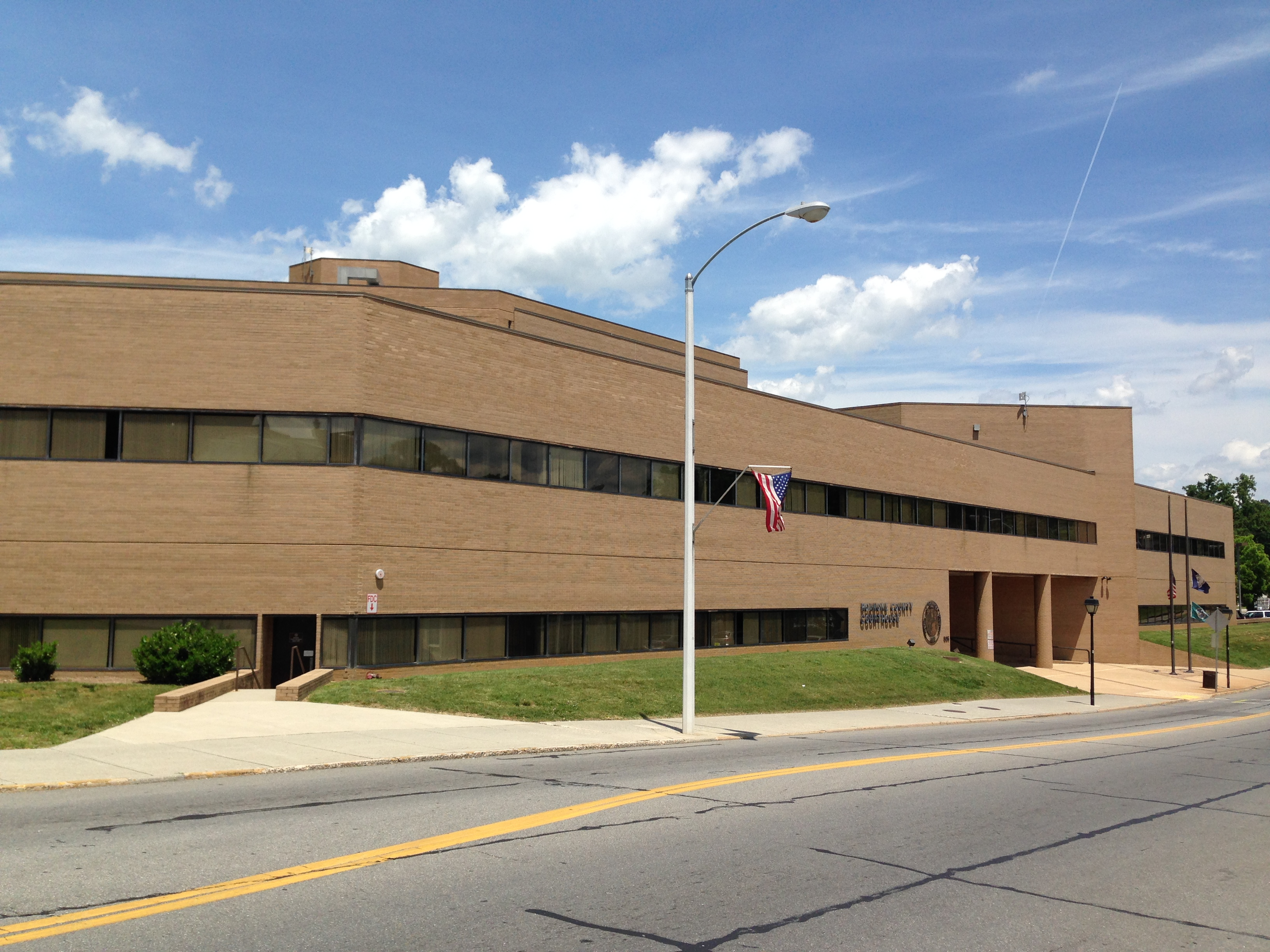
- Roanoke County Courthouse

- Flag Seal Logo

- Location within the U.S. state of Virginia
- Coordinates: 37°16′N 80°05′W
- Country: United States
- State: Virginia
- Founded: March 30, 1838
- Named for: Roanoke River
- Seat: Salem (independent city)^{1}
- Largest town: Vinton

Area
  - Total: 251.3 sq mi (651 km^{2})
  - Land: 250.6 sq mi (649 km^{2})
  - Water: 0.7 sq mi (1.8 km^{2}) 0.3%

Population (2020)
  - Total: 96,929
  - Estimate (2025): 97,150 ▲
  - Density: 386.8/sq mi (149.3/km^{2})
- Time zone: UTC−5 (Eastern)
  - Summer (DST): UTC−4 (EDT)
- Congressional districts: 6th, 9th
- Website: www.roanokecountyva.gov

Roanoke County (/ˈroʊ.əˌnoʊk/ ROH-ə-nohk) is a county in the U.S. state of the Commonwealth of Virginia. As of the 2020 census, its population was 96,929. Its county seat is Salem, but the county administrative offices are located in the census-designated place of Cave Spring.

Roanoke County is part of the Roanoke metropolitan area, and is in the Roanoke Region of Virginia.

The independent cities of Roanoke and Salem (incorporated as such in 1884 and 1968 respectively) are inside the boundaries of Roanoke County but are not a part of the county. The town of Vinton is the only municipality in the county. While significant areas of the county are rural and mountainous, most residents live in the suburbs near Roanoke and Salem in the Roanoke Valley.

== History ==
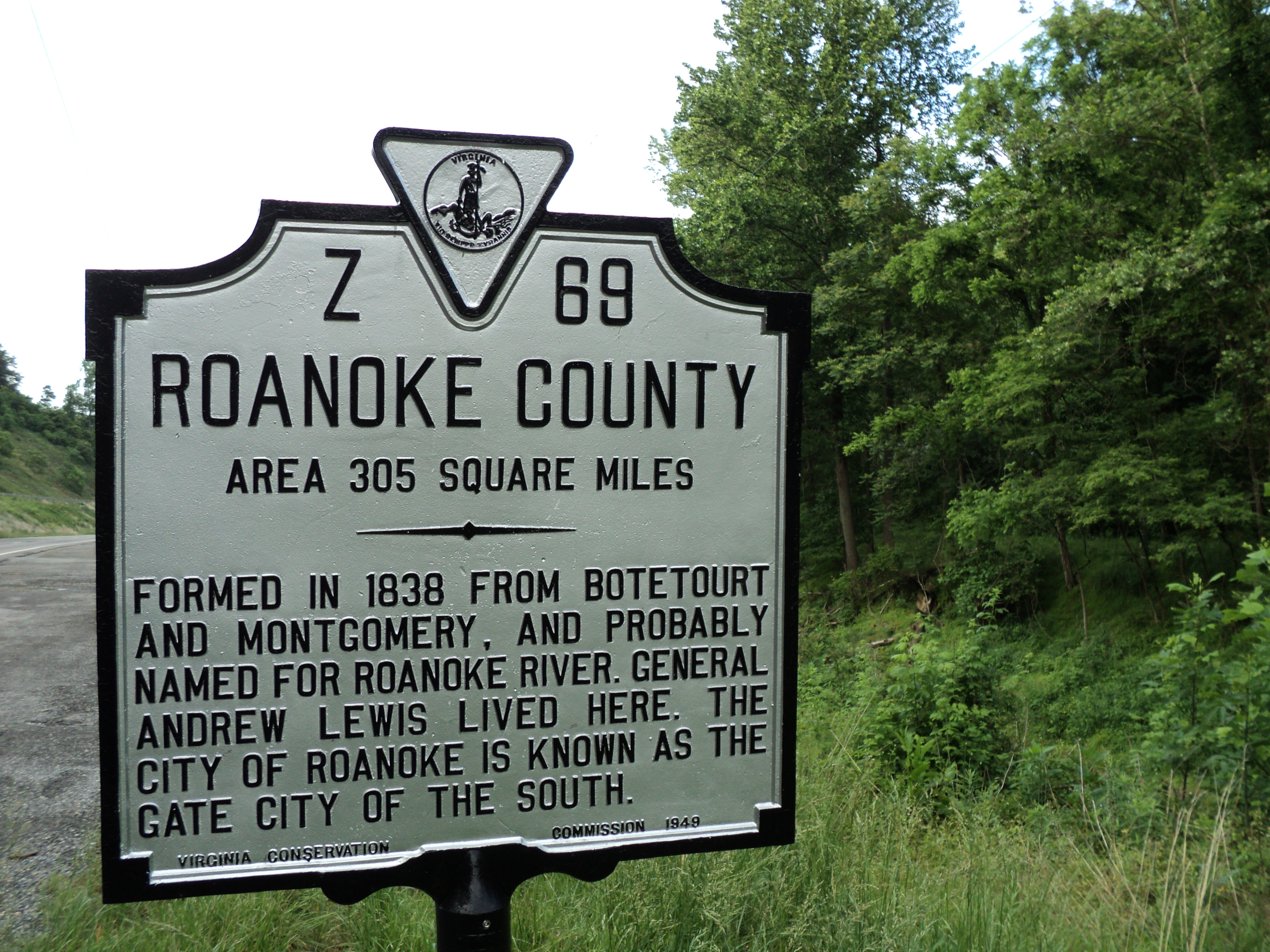
State historical marker for Roanoke County, Virginia

The county was established by an act of the Virginia Legislature on March 30, 1838, from the southern part of Botetourt County. It was named for the Roanoke River, which in turn was derived from a Native American term for money. Additional territory was transferred to Roanoke County from Montgomery County in 1845. Salem was originally the county seat. When Salem became an independent city, by agreement with the county the Roanoke County Courthouse remained in Salem and the two localities share a jail. However, the county administrative offices were moved to the Cave Spring District.

== Geography ==
According to the U.S. Census Bureau, the county has a total area of 251.3 square miles (650.9 km^{2}), of which 250.6 square miles (649.1 km^{2}) is land and 0.7 square miles (1.8 km^{2}) (0.3%) is water.

=== Districts ===
The county is governed by a Board of Supervisors with one representative elected from each of the five magisterial districts: Catawba, Cave Spring, Hollins, Vinton, and Windsor Hills. Vinton is an incorporated town with an elected town council and town manager.

=== Adjacent counties and cities ===
- Bedford County - east
- Botetourt County - northeast
- Craig County - northwest
- Floyd County - southwest
- Franklin County - southeast
- Montgomery County - west
- Roanoke - center (enclave)
- Salem - center (enclave)

=== Nationally protected areas ===
- Blue Ridge Parkway (part)
- Jefferson National Forest (part)

=== Major highways ===
- I-73 (Canceled)
- I-81
- I-581
- US 11
- US 220
- US 221
- US 460
- SR 24
- SR 115
- SR 116
- SR 117
- SR 118
- SR 311
- SR 419
- Blue Ridge Parkway

== Demographics ==
Historical population
Census	Pop.	Note	%±
1840	5,499		—
1850	8,477		54.2%
1860	8,048		−5.1%
1870	9,350		16.2%
1880	13,105		40.2%
1890	30,101		129.7%
1900	15,837		−47.4%
1910	19,623		23.9%
1920	22,395		14.1%
1930	35,289		57.6%
1940	42,897		21.6%
1950	41,486		−3.3%
1960	61,693		48.7%
1970	67,339		9.2%
1980	72,945		8.3%
1990	79,332		8.8%
2000	85,778		8.1%
2010	92,376		7.7%
2020	96,929		4.9%
2025 (est.)	97,150	▲	0.2%
U.S. Decennial Census; 1790-1960 1900-1990; 1990-2000 2010 2020

=== Racial and ethnic composition ===
Roanoke County, Virginia – Racial and ethnic composition Note: the US Census treats Hispanic/Latino as an ethnic category. This table excludes Latinos from the racial categories and assigns them to a separate category. Hispanics/Latinos may be of any race.
Race / Ethnicity (NH = Non-Hispanic)	Pop 1980	Pop 1990	Pop 2000	Pop 2010	Pop 2020	% 1980	% 1990	% 2000	% 2010	% 2020
White alone (NH)	70,571	76,181	79,809	81,886	79,928	96.75%	96.03%	93.04%	88.64%	82.46%
Black or African American alone (NH)	1,677	2,012	2,855	4,580	5,650	2.30%	2.54%	3.33%	4.96%	5.83%
Native American or Alaska Native alone (NH)	36	69	96	121	155	0.05%	0.09%	0.11%	0.13%	0.16%
Asian alone (NH)	250	620	1,365	2,455	3,425	0.34%	0.78%	1.59%	2.66%	3.53%
Native Hawaiian or Pacific Islander alone (NH)	x	x	12	26	24	x	x	0.01%	0.03%	0.02%
Other race alone (NH)	57	10	73	89	435	0.08%	0.01%	0.09%	0.10%	0.45%
Mixed race or Multiracial (NH)	x	x	680	1,268	3,805	x	x	0.79%	1.37%	3.93%
Hispanic or Latino (any race)	354	440	888	1,951	3,507	0.49%	0.55%	1.04%	2.11%	3.62%
Total	72,945	79,332	85,778	92,376	96,929	100.00%	100.00%	100.00%	100.00%	100.00%

=== 2020 census ===
As of the 2020 census, the county had a population of 96,929. The median age was 44.5 years. 20.4% of residents were under the age of 18 and 22.1% of residents were 65 years of age or older. For every 100 females there were 92.0 males, and for every 100 females age 18 and over there were 88.6 males age 18 and over.

The racial makeup of the county was 83.3% White, 5.9% Black or African American, 0.3% American Indian and Alaska Native, 3.6% Asian, 0.0% Native Hawaiian and Pacific Islander, 1.5% from some other race, and 5.3% from two or more races. Hispanic or Latino residents of any race comprised 3.6% of the population.

80.6% of residents lived in urban areas, while 19.4% lived in rural areas.

There were 39,777 households in the county, of which 27.7% had children under the age of 18 living with them and 27.4% had a female householder with no spouse or partner present. About 28.5% of all households were made up of individuals and 14.6% had someone living alone who was 65 years of age or older.

There were 42,147 housing units, of which 5.6% were vacant. Among occupied housing units, 75.5% were owner-occupied and 24.5% were renter-occupied. The homeowner vacancy rate was 1.3% and the rental vacancy rate was 7.7%.

=== 2000 Census ===
As of the census of 2000, there were 85,778 people, 34,686 households, and 24,696 families residing in the county. The population density was 342 people per square mile (132 people/km^{2}). There were 36,121 housing units at an average density of 144 units per square mile (56 units/km^{2}). The racial makeup of the county was 93.63% White, 3.35% Black or African American, 0.12% Native American, 1.61% Asian, 0.02% Pacific Islander, 0.39% from other races, and 0.89% from two or more races. 1.04% of the population were Hispanic or Latino of any race.

There were 34,686 households, out of which 30.60% had children under the age of 18 living with them, 59.90% were married couples living together, 8.50% had a female householder with no husband present, and 28.80% were non-families. 25.10% of all households were made up of individuals, and 10.10% had someone living alone who was 65 years of age or older. The average household size was 2.41 and the average family size was 2.88.

In the county, the population was spread out, with 22.70% under the age of 18, 6.60% from 18 to 24, 27.50% from 25 to 44, 27.20% from 45 to 64, and 15.90% who were 65 years of age or older. The median age was 41 years. For every 100 females there were 89.60 males. For every 100 females aged 18 and over, there were 85.30 males.

The median income for a household in the county was $47,689, and the median income for a family was $56,450. Males had a median income of $39,126 versus $26,690 for females. The per capita income for the county was $24,637. About 2.70% of families and 4.50% of the population were below the poverty line, including 5.20% of those under age 18 and 4.90% of those age 65 or over.

== Politics ==
Roanoke County is a strongly Republican county in Presidential elections. It was one of the first places in Virginia to turn Republican. No Democrat has carried the county since Franklin D. Roosevelt in 1944, and Jimmy Carter in 1976 is the last Democrat to garner even 40 percent of the vote.

Roanoke City (The independent city of Roanoke) sits in the middle of Roanoke County and is strongly Democratic and has voted for Democrats in each presidential election since 1988.

United States presidential election results for Roanoke County, Virginia
Year	Republican		Democratic		Third party(ies)	
Year	No.	%	No.	%	No.	%
1912	108	10.60%	696	68.30%	215	21.10%
1916	460	34.23%	850	63.24%	34	2.53%
1920	955	41.85%	1,286	56.35%	41	1.80%
1924	695	36.77%	1,078	57.04%	117	6.19%
1928	2,675	67.57%	1,284	32.43%	0	0.00%
1932	1,704	39.93%	2,509	58.79%	55	1.29%
1936	2,105	37.87%	3,422	61.57%	31	0.56%
1940	2,302	39.10%	3,539	60.11%	47	0.80%
1944	3,146	48.13%	3,380	51.71%	10	0.15%
1948	3,988	53.49%	2,876	38.58%	591	7.93%
1952	6,017	68.95%	2,689	30.82%	20	0.23%
1956	7,509	69.83%	2,899	26.96%	345	3.21%
1960	9,109	67.31%	4,384	32.40%	39	0.29%
1964	10,714	54.84%	8,808	45.09%	14	0.07%
1968	12,439	58.89%	3,902	18.47%	4,783	22.64%
1972	19,920	77.28%	5,318	20.63%	540	2.09%
1976	13,587	50.42%	13,120	48.69%	241	0.89%
1980	17,182	55.76%	12,114	39.31%	1,518	4.93%
1984	23,348	68.56%	10,569	31.04%	137	0.40%
1988	22,011	62.61%	12,938	36.80%	208	0.59%
1992	20,667	50.31%	14,704	35.79%	5,709	13.90%
1996	20,700	52.51%	15,387	39.03%	3,334	8.46%
2000	25,740	60.12%	16,141	37.70%	936	2.19%
2004	30,596	65.14%	16,082	34.24%	295	0.63%
2008	30,571	59.97%	19,812	38.87%	592	1.16%
2012	31,624	61.75%	18,711	36.53%	882	1.72%
2016	31,408	61.00%	17,200	33.41%	2,881	5.60%
2020	34,268	59.93%	21,801	38.12%	1,115	1.95%
2024	34,453	60.39%	21,693	38.03%	902	1.58%

== Education ==
There are five public high schools in the Roanoke County Public Schools:

- Cave Spring
- Glenvar
- Hidden Valley
- Northside
- William Byrd

Hollins University, a member of the Old Dominion Athletic Conference, is in northern Roanoke County, near the Botetourt County border. Roanoke College, also a member of the Old Dominion Athletic Conference, is in the independent city of Salem within the boundaries of Roanoke County; Salem's former county courthouse on Main Street is now a college academic building.

== Notable people ==
Notable sports figures from Roanoke County include Tiki Barber, Ronde Barber and J. J. Redick, all of whom attended and graduated from Cave Spring High School in southwestern Roanoke County.

== Communities ==
=== Town ===
- Vinton

=== Census-designated places ===
- Cave Spring
- Glenvar
- Hollins

=== Other unincorporated communities ===
- Back Creek
- Bent Mountain
- Bonsack
- Catawba
- Clearbrook
- Hanging Rock
- Masons Cove
- Mount Pleasant
- Oak Grove
- Penn Forest
- Poages Mill

Many of these CDPs and unincorporated areas have mailing addresses in the cities of Roanoke and Salem.

== See also ==
- National Register of Historic Places listings in Roanoke County, Virginia

== Bibliography ==
- Jack, George S. and Edward Boyle Jacobs, (1912). History of Roanoke County, Stone.
