= Three Rivers District (VHSL) =

The A Three Rivers District is a high school conference of the Virginia High School League located in Southwest Virginia.

== History ==
The district was originally named for the New River, Roanoke River, and Little River and was focused on the New River Valley. In 2017, the VHSL shuffled many districts, including the Three Rivers, because of demographic changes. In an effort to have schools of similar size competing in the same districts, smaller members were removed from the conference as Auburn and Giles High Schools moved to the A Mountain Empire District and Eastern Montgomery shifted to the A Pioneer District. These schools were replaced when Pioneer District powerhouse James River joined and Alleghany and Carroll County moved down from the larger Blue Ridge and River Ridge Districts, respectively. These moves changed the rivers cited in the name as the addition of Alleghany and James River High Schools brought the Cowpasture, Jackson, and James Rivers into the conversation as well.

In late 2020, it was announced that Alleghany County Public Schools and Covington City Public Schools would merge due to declining attendance. The new school system will be known as Alleghany Highlands Public Schools and the two high schools will merge to create a new Alleghany High School that will take on Covington's Cougar nickname.

== Geographic makeup ==
The Three Rivers District is located in Southwest Virginia and takes its name from the rivers mentioned above. It draws its members from the Roanoke Valley, the New River Valley and the Alleghany Highlands. The district currently includes members from Alleghany County, Botetourt County, Carroll County, Floyd County, Roanoke County, and Radford City.

== Regional and state competition ==
While the VHSL uses District formatting for regular season contests and determining postseason eligibility, the teams are divided into different classes and regions for Regional and State-level competitions. As such, Three Rivers District members compete in the following formats (as of 2022):

- Class 3, Region C (Alleghany)
- Class 3, Region D (Carroll County)
- Class 2, Region C (Floyd County, Glenvar, James River, Patrick County, Radford)

== Member schools ==
School	Location	Mascot	Colors	2021-22 9–12 enrollment
Carroll County High School	Hillsville	Cavaliers		1,069
Floyd County High School	Floyd	Buffaloes		586
Glenvar High School	Salem	Highlanders		627
James River High School	Buchanan	Knights		548
Patrick County High School	Stuart	Cougars		694
Radford High School	Radford	Bobcats		504
Martinsville High School	Martinsville	Bulldogs		593

== Former members ==
School	Location	Mascot	Colors	Current District
Alleghany High School	Covington	Cougars		Shenandoah
Auburn High School	Riner	Eagles		Mountain Empire
Eastern Montgomery High School	Elliston	Mustangs		Pioneer
Giles High School	Pearisburg	Spartans		Mountain Empire
