= Manassas Park High School =

Location
- 8200 Euclid Avenue; Manassas Park, Virginia 20111

Information
- Type: Public high school
- Established: 1976
- School district: Manassas Park City Schools
- Superintendent: Melissa Saunders
- Principal: Charles Forrest
- Grades: 9–12
- Enrollment: 1,128 (2023-24)
- Campus: Suburban
- Colors: Black, Vegas Gold
- Athletics conference: AAA Region B Northwestern District
- Mascot: Cougars
- Rival: Brentsville District High School
- Website: Manassas Park High School

Manassas Park High School is a public high school in Manassas Park, Virginia. This school is part of Manassas Park City Schools and is at 8200 Euclid Avenue, Manassas Park, Virginia. The school has an enrollment of a little over 1100 students and serves all high school students living in Manassas Park.

== History and Administration ==
Manassas Park High School was originally opened on September 15, 1976 as a junior/senior high school, housing grades 7 through 12. The chosen mascot for the school was the Cougars, and the colors (black and gold) were modeled from the then two-time Super Bowl champions, the Pittsburgh Steelers. A new building for the school was opened in a new location in 1999.

=== Administration ===
The current principal of Manassas Park High School is Charles Forrest. Prior to being appointed principal, Forrest was an assistant principal at Manassas Park High School.

== Academics ==
=== Accreditation ===
Manassas Park High School, like all the other schools in Manassas Park, is fully accredited by the Virginia Department of Education.

=== Programs ===
There are several academic programs offered at Manassas Park High School. Students are given the opportunity to attend The Governor's School at Innovation Park, a school that is housed on the Prince William County campus of George Mason University that focuses completely on a Science, technology, engineering, and mathematics curriculum. The school also recently created a Certified Nurse Aid (CNA) Program. Manassas Park High School's music programs have also earned the school the VMEA Blue Ribbon Award.

== Extracurriculars ==
Manassas Park High School offers multiple extracurricular activities including Scholastic Bowl (academic team), Theatre, Student Council, and the Marching Cougars (Marching Band).

=== Athletics ===
Manassas Park High School's mascot is a cougar and its sports teams currently play in the Northwestern District and AA Region II. Manassas Park offers competitive cheer, cross country, football, golf, indoor and outdoor track, girls' volleyball, basketball, wrestling, swimming, baseball, soccer, and softball.

==== Cheerleading ====
Manassas Park's cheerleading team won a state championship in 2011.

==== Football ====
Manassas Park's football program began with the opening of the school in 1976. The team had its first state championship appearance in 1986 losing to Parry McCluer High School with a score 24-0. In 2004, the Manassas Park Cougars' football team won Virginia A State Championship defeating Powell Valley High School with a score of 20-13. The team went undefeated that season. The team has struggled in recent years, ultimately having to cancel their varsity football season twice in the last decade (once in 2018 and again in 2022).

==== Boys Soccer ====
In 2011, the Manassas Park Cougars' Boys Soccer team won the Virginia A State Championship defeating George Mason High School (now known as Meridian High School). The score was 3-2. The team won another state championship the following year, defeating Northampton High School with a score of 4-3.

==== Softball ====
In 2000, the Cougars softball team won a state championship defeating Patrick Henry High School - Glade Spring.

==== Boys Outdoor Track ====
In 2012, the Cougars track team won a state championship, defeating Radford High School by one point.

Girls Outdoor Track

The Girls Outdoor track team won back-to-back state championships in 2010 and 2011, defeating James River High School - Buchanan both times.

==== Wrestling ====
Manassas Park has had many successes with its wrestling program. The school has had several team and individual championships. They won their first team championship in 1979 defeating Parry McCuer High School. The Cougars then won back-to-back championships in 1981 and 1982, defeating Brentsville District High School and Parry McCluer. From 1984 to 1986, the school won three straight state championships, defeating Essex High School, Strasburg High School, and Castlewood High School. The Cougars repeated this again from 2004 to 2006, winning three straight team state championships, defeating Parry McCluer, Strasburg, and Rural Retreat High School. The cougars won their last team state championship in 2011, beating Floyd County High School by 47 points.
