= Pioneer District =

High school conference in Virginia, U.S.

The Pioneer District is a high school conference in the state of Virginia that comprises high schools located in Southwest Virginia.

== History ==
The District was originally composed of small schools in the Allegany Highlands and northern and western Roanoke Valley. In 2017, the VHSL shuffled many districts, including the Three Rivers, because of demographic changes. In an effort to have schools of similar size competing in the same districts, James River, who had largely dominated the district and had by far the largest enrollment, was shifted to the Three Rivers District. To replace the Knights, Eastern Montgomery High School of the Three Rivers District and Narrows High School of the Mountain Empire District shifted to the Pioneer District.

== Geographic makeup ==
The Pioneer District comprises high schools in the Alleghany Highlands and the Roanoke, New River, and southern Shenandoah Valleys. This Alleghany Highlands is probably best known for being the home of or at least nearby five-star vacation resorts such as The Homestead and The Greenbrier, the latter which is in West Virginia.

Although the schools in the Pioneer District are very small in size, most of its members do field teams in most of the sports offered by the Virginia High School League. One notable exception to this is football, with Highland High School not participating because of its small enrollment. The largest school in the Pioneer District is Parry McCluer High School, located in Buena Vista, Virginia (with about 365 students), and the smallest is Highland, located in Monterey, Virginia. Due to its size, Parry McCluer has dominated most of the district's sports in recent years, culminating with their winning of 5 state football championships. .

== Regional and state competition ==
While the VHSL uses District formatting for regular season contests and determining postseason eligibility, the teams are divided into different classes and regions for Regional and State-level competitions. The Pioneer District is fairly unique when compared to other local districts as all members complete in Class 1, Region C (as of 2022).:

== Member schools ==
School	Location	Mascot	Colors	2017-18 9–12 enrollment
Bath County High School	Hot Springs	Chargers		205
Craig County High School	New Castle	Rockets		208
Eastern Montgomery High School	Elliston	Mustangs		297
Highland High School	Monterey	Rams		58
Narrows High School	Narrows	Green Wave		265
Parry McCluer High School	Buena Vista	Fighting Blues		336

== Former members ==
School	Location	Mascot	Colors	Current District
Auburn High School	Riner	Eagles		Mountain Empire
Covington High School	Covington	Cougars		School Closed
James River High School	Buchanan	Knights		Three Rivers

Note: Covington High School was closed following the 2022-23 school year, with its student body being merged into Alleghany High School. The new, larger Alleghany High School has since adopted Covington's Cougar nickname
