= Manassas Park City Schools =

School district in Virginia, United States

Address
- 100 Park Central Plaza Suite #300 Manassas Park, Virginia, 20111; United States

District information
- Type: Public
- Grades: Pre-K through 12
- Superintendent: Dr. Melissa Saunders
- School board: 5 members
- Chair of the board: Paul Alexander
- Governing agency: Virginia Department of Education
- Schools: 4

Other information
- Website: www.mpark.net

Manassas Park City Schools is a school division that serves the city of Manassas Park, Virginia, United States. The district administers a total of four schools (2 elementary and 2 secondary).

== History ==
=== Schools ===
Manassas Park City Schools first opened in 1976 with four schools: Conner Elementary School, Independence Elementary School, Manassas Park Elementary School, and Manassas Park High School. The elementary schools served grades K-6, and the high school served grades 7-12.

In 1981, Independence Elementary School was closed due to a loss of enrollment and then reopened in 1984 with one wing serving preschool and kindergarten. In the 1985–1986 school year, Manassas Park implemented the all-city concept by having Independence Elementary serve Preschool and Kindergarten, Manassas Park Elementary serve grades 1–3, Conner Elementary serve grades 4–6, Manassas Park Intermediate serve grades 7–8, and Manassas Park High School serve grades 9-12.

In July 1999, the building for Cougar Elementary School. After Cougar opened, Conner Elementary and Independence Elementary would close, Manassas Park Elementary School would house grades 4–5, and grade 6, formerly housed in Conner Elementary, would be moved to Manassas Park Middle School.

=== Former Superintendents ===
- Robert Strickland served as the first Manassas Park City Schools' Superintendent from 1976 to 1979. Before being appointed, he taught high school for ten years, served as a principal, administrative assistant to the superintendent, and served as superintendent in Lee County, Virginia and Pineville, Kentucky.
- Robert Lewis served as superintendent from 1979 to 1981. Before that, he was principal of Stonewall Jackson High School (now Unity Reed High School)
- Gary Smith was appointed superintendent in January 1982. Before being appointed, he taught at Stonewall Jackson High School (now Unity Reed High School), Brentsville High School, and served as principal of Windsor High School in Isle of Wight, Virginia. (1982-1985)
- Jimmy Stuart served as superintendent from 1985 to 1988.
- James Moyers was appointed superintendent in 1988. Before being appointed, he was the assistant superintendent and the principal of Manassas Park High School. Moyers died in 1991.
- John David Martin served as superintendent from 1991 to 1995.
- Dr. Thomas H. Debolt served as Superintendent of Manassas Park City Schools from 1995 to November 2010. Prior to DeBolt's appointment, he was the principal of Pulaski County High School. Debolt's vision and the history of the Manassas Park school system are captured in the book "The Little School System That Could: Transforming a City School District," by Daniel L. Duke, a professor at the University of Virginia's Curry School of Education. DeBolt oversaw the renovation and addition of Manassas Park High School, the renovation of Manassas Park Middle School, and the building of Cougar Elementary School.
- Dr. C. Bruce McDade was the superintendent from December 1, 2010, to June 30, 2021. He was appointed associate superintendent for curriculum and technology in 2006 but started his career with the Manassas Park School system in 2001 as principal of Manassas Park High School. McDade announced that he would be retiring at the end of the 2019–2020 school year. However, due to the COVID-19 pandemic, he announced that he would stay until the end of the 2020–2021 school year.

== Administration ==
=== Superintendent ===
The superintendent of Manassas Park City Schools is Melissa Saunders. She began her tenure at the beginning of the 2021–2022 school year. Before being appointed Superintendent, Saunders worked in Manassas City Public Schools, where she has served as the director of student achievement from 2016 to 2021. Saunders is the first female superintendent in Manassas Park's history.

=== School board members ===
There are currently five seats of the Manassas Park City School Board. All members are appointed.

- Paul Alexander, Chair
- Dr. Shaunté Jones, Vice Chair
- Michael Cummings
- Zach Graham
- Ellen Slobodnik
- Melinda Desaulniers, School Board Clerk

== Schools ==
Manassas Park currently has four schools. 2 elementary, 1 middle school and 1 high school. All four schools in the district are fully accredited.

=== Elementary schools ===
- Cougar Elementary School (K-2)
- Manassas Park Elementary School (3-5)

=== Secondary schools ===
- Manassas Park Middle School (6–8).
- Manassas Park High School (9-12)
