= Christiansburg High School =

Public high school in Virginia, US

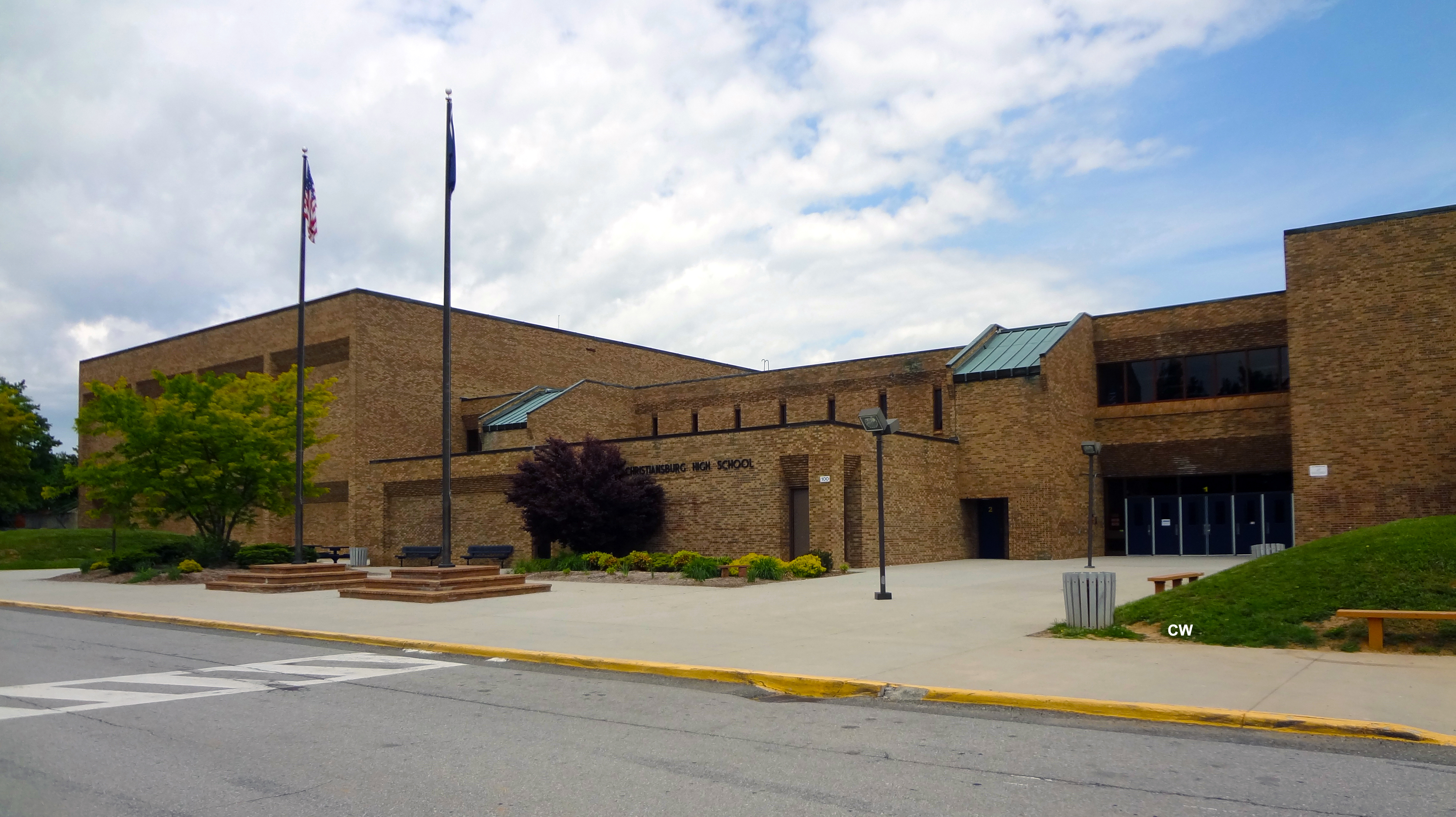

Location
- 100 Independence Boulevard; Christiansburg, Virginia 24073; United States; 37°8′39.32″N 80°24′57.22″W

Information
- School type: Public, High School
- Established: 1906
- Locale: City, Small
- School district: Montgomery County Public Schools
- NCES District ID: 5102520
- Superintendent: Annie Whitaker (acting)
- NCES School ID: 510252001019
- Principal: Shane Guynn
- Teaching staff: 80.30 (on an FTE basis)
- Grades: 9–12
- Enrollment: 1,072 (2024–25)
- Student to teacher ratio: 13.35
- Language: English
- Colors: Blue and Gold
- Athletics conference: Virginia High School League; AA Region IV; River Ridge District
- Nickname: Blue Demons
- Rivals: Blacksburg High School; Cave Spring High School; Hidden Valley High School; Pulaski County High School; Salem High School
- Website: chs.mcps.org

Christiansburg High School is located at 100 Independence Blvd. in Christiansburg, Virginia in the County of Montgomery and is located just minutes from Virginia Tech and Radford University. The school opened in 1906 and had its first graduating class of three students in 1909. The school was named for the town in which it was built.

The town of Christiansburg, the county seat of Montgomery County incorporated November 10, 1792 and was named after Colonel William Christian, one of the first justices. Colonel William Christian studied law with Patrick Henry and courted and married Henry's sister, Ann.

The school also is a part of the region that sends students to SWVGS (Southwest Virginia Governor's School) in Pulaski County.

== Faculty ==
- Principal: Shane Guynn
- Assistant Principal: Jodi Bailey
- Assistant Principal: Alex Wilkins
- Assistant Principal: Courtney Harrington (formerly Craggett)
- Athletic Director: Michael Hunter
- Counselors: Lindsey Boyer, Joel Bates, and Suzanne Woodward
- Librarians: Susan Light
- Head Town/School Liaison: Matthew Underwood
- CTE Teachers: Abigail Adams, Chad Burch, Christopher Conner, Dr. Gerald Millner, Stephen Smith, Inst. Mark Monju, Rebecca Fore, Jessica Shannon, Susan McMinn, Cary Dunn, Paula Tabarini, Andrew Abbott, Melissa Cook, Adrianna Phillips, Kamren Harris-Gilliam, Tonya Poff, Darrel Roberts, Terry Findley, Chase Lowe
- Nurses: Karen Bowman, Abigail Stone

== Fine arts ==
The Christiansburg Blue Demon marching band and the symphonic band received superiors at the festivals, making the band a Virginia State Honor Band.

All three choral groups received superior ratings as well, making CHS a Virginia Blue Ribbon school.

Musicals produced by CHS include, but are not limited to: Footloose, Little Shop of Horrors, Seven Brides for Seven Brothers, Godspell, The Last Five Years, Forever Plaid, Seussical, Breaking Up Is Hard to Do, Beauty and the Beast, Ragtime, Just So, The Civil War, Seussical the Musical, Tarzan the musical, Burnt Part Boys, James and the Giant Peach, and Newsies.

== Academic Competition ==
=== Mountain Academic Competition Conference ===
Mountain Academic Competition Conference (MACC) is a high school quiz bowl league of the Academic Competition for Excellence. The MACC team consists of teams including math, English, science, social studies, and all-around. The math team made it to semifinals of the eastern division MACC tournament and finished third in their division for the season. The English team finished 1st for the season and 1st at the tournament, making them eligible to go to the Super MACC tournament. At Super MACC, they lost to Carrol County High School in the semi-finals; Carrol County ended up winning the Super MACC tournament. The social studies and science teams made it to semifinals, and the all-around team did not advance to semifinals. The science team finished 4th for the season, the social studies team 3rd, and the all-around team 4th.

=== Scholastic Bowl ===
Christiansburg won the state championship in scholastic bowl in 2011, and placed as runner-up in 2012 to rival Cave Spring. Christiansburg's academic team placed 21st in the nation at the NAQT HSNCT tournament in 2012.

== Athletics ==
Christiansburg High School athletic teams are known as the Blue Demons, with the school colors being blue and gold.

=== Wrestling Team ===
The Christiansburg Blue Demons wrestling team won 17 straight state titles from 2002 through 2018. This stands as the record for the longest state championship winning streak in Virginia athletic history.

== Confederate Flag Protest ==
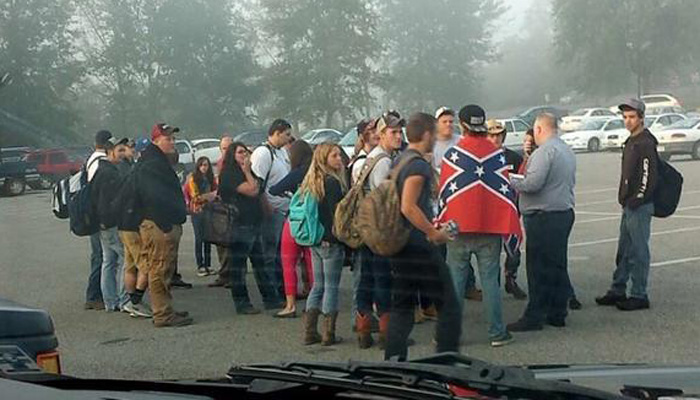
Confederate Flag Protest at Christiansburg High School on September 17, 2015

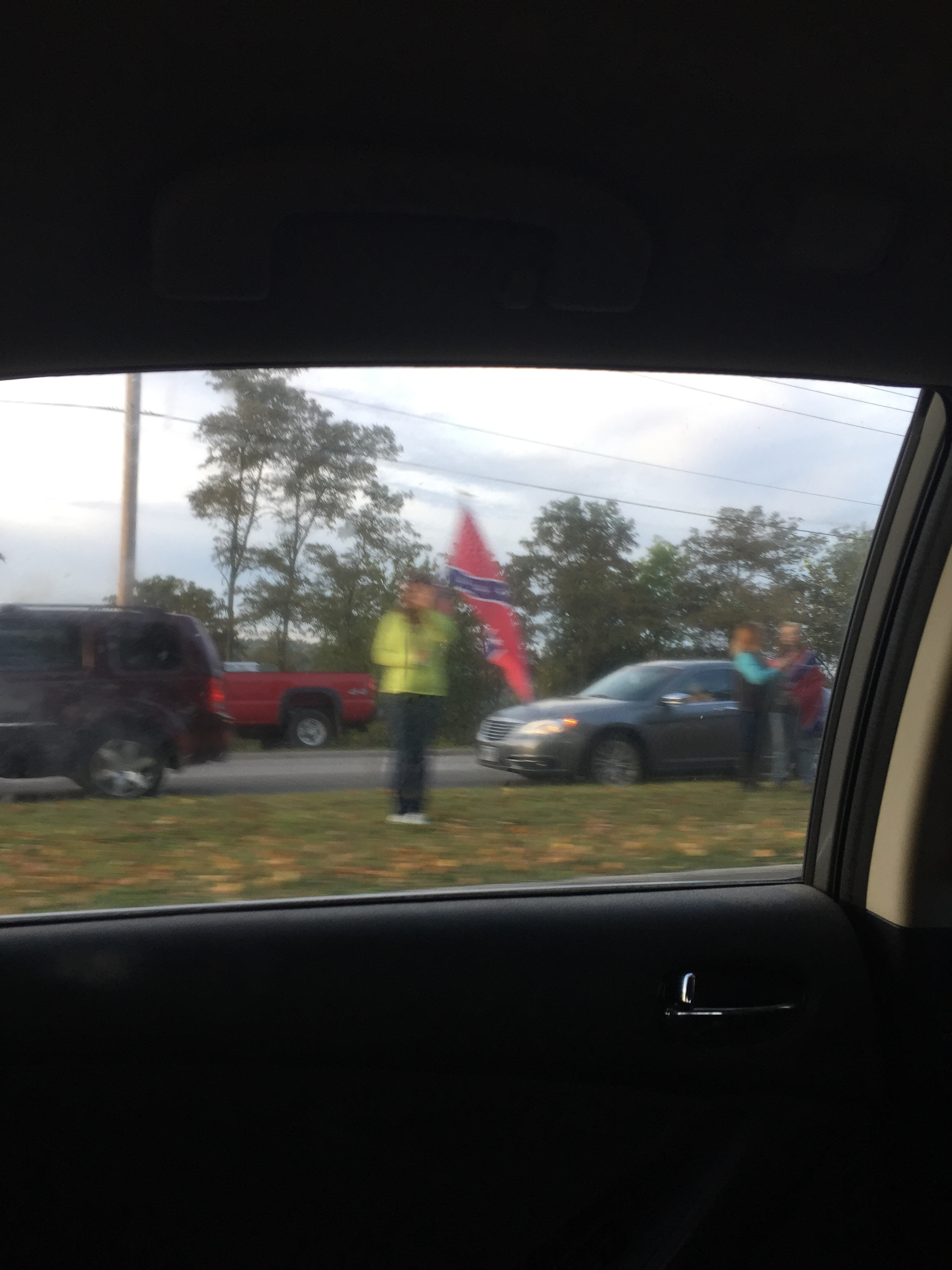
Smaller Confederate Flag Protest at Christiansburg High School. On Thursday, September 24, 2015, at around 7:30 AM

On September 17, 2015, at approximately 7:45 A.M. around 25 students arrived to Christiansburg High School wearing attire that violate the school's dress code. Upon entry to the school building, the students were asked to comply with the dress code. While some students complied, those who did not were placed in In-School-Suspension, the standard disciplinary procedure for this type of infraction. Around 17 students in In-School-Suspension proceeded to disrupt the school environment through loud displays and behavior, as a result of the continued disruption, the students were issued a One-Day Out-Of-School-Suspension. After the initial protest, there were smaller protests that occurred.

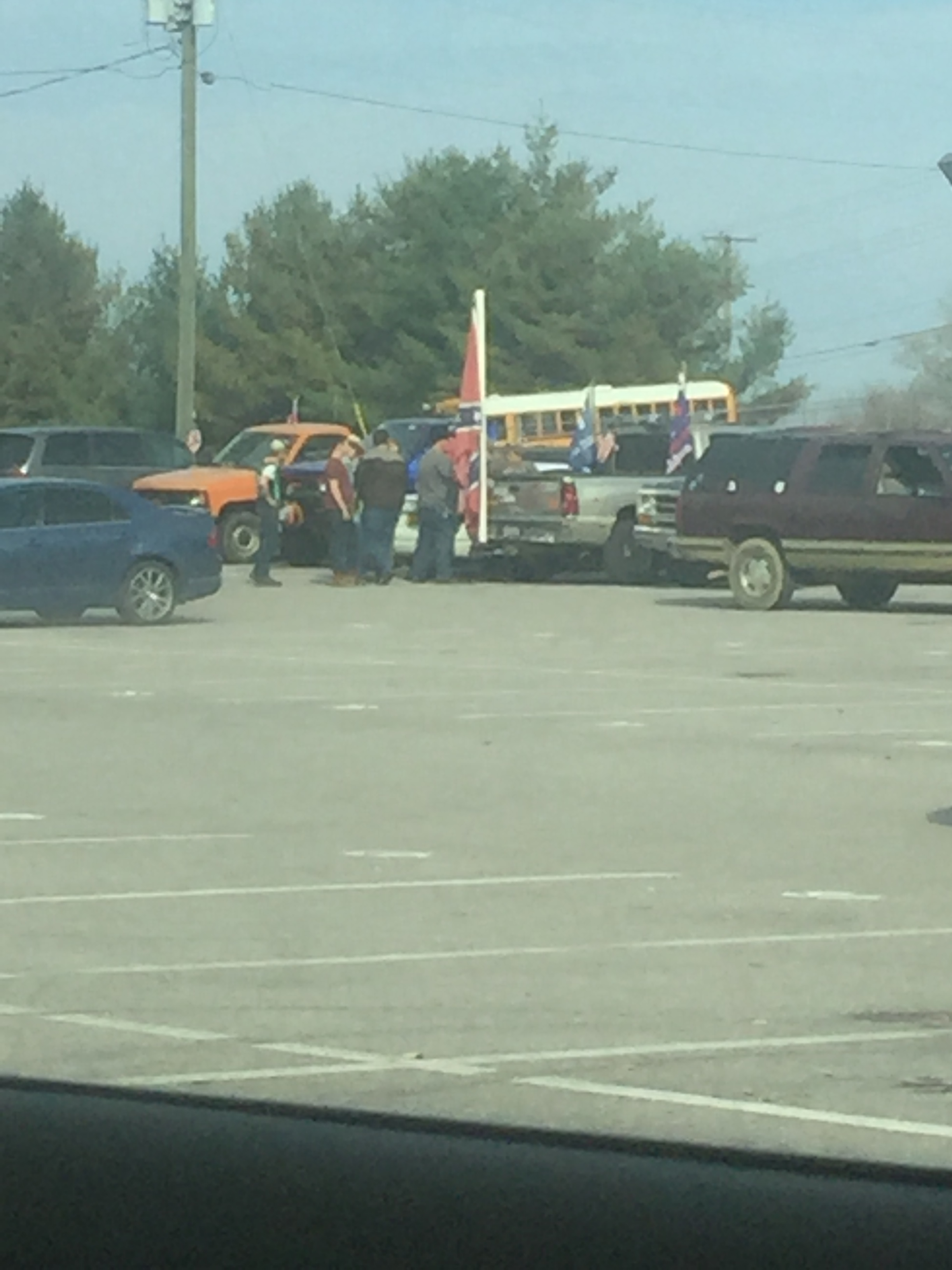
Confederate Flag Protest at Christiansburg High School on October 31, 2016

On October 31, 2016, at approximately 9:00 A.M. around 5 students arrived to Christiansburg High School with Confederate flags attached to their vehicles. When the students parked their vehicles on school grounds they were asked to comply with the schools Parking Permit Contract, which you have to sign to obtain a parking permit, all of the students complied and removed the Confederate flags off of their vehicles.

== See also ==
- Christiansburg, Virginia
- Montgomery County, Virginia
