= AAA Western Valley District =

American high school athletic conference in Virginia

The AAA Western Valley District was a high school athletic conference in the US state of Virginia that included a small number of schools in Central and Southwest Virginia competing in VHSL Group AAA, the largest enrollment classification of the Virginia High School League (VHSL).

The Western Valley District schools competed in the AAA Northwest Region, along with schools from the AAA Cardinal District, AAA Cedar Run District, and AAA Commonwealth District.

In the 2013–2014 school year, the remaining Western Valley District schools were reassigned to former Group AA districts—specifically, the River Ridge District, Blue Ridge District, and Piedmont District. Each school subsequently competed in postseason play within its new VHSL classification and conference.

== History ==
The Western Valley District was formed in 2001 through the consolidation of the then-declining AAA Roanoke Valley District and AAA Western District. Each had dwindling membership due to regional school enrollment declines. Several schools had already transitioned to AA classification prior to consolidation.

Below is a summary of district membership prior to and after the 2001 realignment:

=== AAA Roanoke Valley District (2000–2001) ===
- Cave Spring High School → Joined AAA Western Valley
- William Fleming High School → Moved to AA Blue Ridge District
- Franklin County → Joined AAA Western Valley
- Patrick Henry → Joined AAA Western Valley
- Pulaski County High School → Moved to AA Blue Ridge District

=== AAA Western District (2000–2001) ===
- Albemarle → Joined AAA Commonwealth District
- E. C. Glass High School → Joined AAA Western Valley
- Halifax County High School → Joined AAA Western Valley
- George Washington (Danville) → Joined AAA Western Valley

In 2002, Cave Spring High School split to form Hidden Valley High School. By 2003–2004, Cave Spring moved to AA classification, reducing Western Valley membership.

In 2007, William Fleming High School rejoined the district due to rising enrollment, restoring the Roanoke rivalry with Patrick Henry.

=== Travel & Playoff Challenges ===
The Western Valley District faced persistent **logistical issues**. Most AAA schools in Virginia were located in northern and eastern regions, meaning Western Valley schools routinely traveled long distances. In football, VHSL's power point system often penalized district members because they played AA opponents—worth fewer points—due to geographic proximity. To compensate, some schools scheduled intra-district games twice per season, with the second game counting toward district standings.

== Final Member Schools (2012–2013) ==
- Franklin County High School (Eagles)
- George Washington High School (Eagles)
- Halifax County High School (Comets)
- Patrick Henry High School (Patriots)
- William Fleming High School (Colonels)

== Post-2013 Realignment Assignments ==
- Franklin County High School – Piedmont District, Group 6A, South Region, Conference 3
- George Washington High School (Danville) – Piedmont District, Group 4A, North Region, Conference 24
- Halifax County High School – Piedmont District, Group 5A, North Region, Conference 16
- Patrick Henry High School (Roanoke) – River Ridge District, Group 6A, South Region, Conference 3
- William Fleming High School – Blue Ridge District, Group 4A, North Region, Conference 24

== Former Members of the Western Valley District and Predecessors ==
- Albemarle
- Amherst County High School (dropped to AA)
- Andrew Lewis High School (Salem, 1920s–1977)
- Cave Spring High School (1970–2002, dropped to AA in 2003)
- E. C. Glass High School (Lynchburg, dropped to AA in 2009)
- Heritage (Lynchburg, 1970s–1993, dropped to AA)
- Jefferson Sr. (Roanoke, 1920s–1974)
- Northside (1970–1988, dropped to AA)
- Pulaski County High School (1974–2001, dropped to AA)
- Robert E. Lee (Staunton) (1970s)
- Salem (1977–1988)

== See also ==
- Virginia High School League
- VHSL Group AAA
- VHSL realignment
