= Blue Ridge District =

Virginia high school district

The AA Blue Ridge District is a district in the Region III of the Virginia High School League. The district is centered around the Roanoke Valley in Southwest Virginia and is named for the Blue Ridge Mountains, which feature prominently in the region's geography.

== History ==
From the late 1980s through the early 2000s, the district steadily grew as four schools dropped in classification from the former AAA Roanoke Valley District. Two schools entered after the AA New River Valley District disbanded when other schools dropped in classification to Group A. For the 2002–2003 school year, the student body of Group AAA Cave Spring High School in Roanoke County was split into two Group AA sized schools with the opening of Hidden Valley High School. These two new schools gave the district eleven members that year except in football, where Cave Spring remained in AAA and Hidden Valley did not play a full schedule.

The district was split for the 2003–2004 school year. The name Blue Ridge District remained with this group of schools because Alleghany, Lord Botetourt, and William Byrd had the longest tenures in the district. The other group of six schools formed the AA River Ridge District. The Blue Ridge District only had four members starting in the 2007–2008 school year when William Fleming returned to Group AAA, but it grew to five members starting in the 2009–2010 school year when former member Staunton River returned from the AA Seminole District and to six members in the 2010–2011 school year when former member Rockbridge County returned from the AA Southern Valley District.

The Blue Ridge District will be preserved in the 2013-2014 VSHL reclassification. William Fleming will also return to the district from the AAA Western Valley District. The district will include schools from classifications 3A and 4A. Each school will compete only against members of the same classification in post-season play.

== Geographic Makeup ==
The district is composed of large and medium-sized high schools primarily in the eastern and northern areas of the Roanoke Valley. The district currently includes two schools located in Roanoke County, and one each in Bedford County, Botetourt County, Franklin County, and Roanoke City.

== Regional and State Competition ==
While the VHSL uses District formatting for regular season contests and determining postseason eligibility, the teams are divided into different classes and regions for Regional and State-level competitions. As such, Blue Ridge District members compete in the following formats (as of 2024):

- Class 5, Region C (Franklin County, William Fleming)
- Class 3, Region D (Lord Botetourt, Northside, Staunton River, William Byrd)

== Member schools ==
School	Location	Mascot	Colors	2022-23 9–12 enrollment
Franklin County High School	Rocky Mount	Eagles		2,016
Lord Botetourt High School	Daleville	Cavaliers		1,052
Northside High School	Roanoke	Vikings		1,013
Staunton River High School	Moneta	Golden Eagles		1,343
William Byrd High School	Vinton	Terriers		1,107
William Fleming High School	Roanoke	Colonels		1,911

== Former Member schools ==
School	Location	Mascot	Colors	Current District
Alleghany High School	Covington	Mountaineers		Shenandoah
Blacksburg High School	Blacksburg	Bruins		River Ridge
Cave Spring High School	Roanoke	Knights		River Ridge
Christiansburg High School	Christiansburg	Blue Demons		River Ridge
Covington High School	Covington	Cougars		School Closed
Glenvar High School	Salem	Highlanders		Three Rivers
Hidden Valley High School	Roanoke	Titans		River Ridge
James River High School	Buchanan	Knights		Three Rivers
Liberty High School	Bedford	Minutemen		Seminole
Pulaski County High School	Dublin	Cougars		River Ridge
Rockbridge County High School	Lexington	Wildcats		Shenandoah
Salem High School	Salem	Spartans		River Ridge

Note: Covington High School was closed following the 2022–23 school year, with its student body being merged into Alleghany High School. The new, larger Alleghany High School has since adopted Covington's Cougar nickname
