= Montgomery County Public Schools =

Montgomery County Public Schools may refer to:

- Montgomery County Public Schools (Maryland)
- Montgomery County Public Schools (Virginia)
