= Riner Historic District =

Historic district in Virginia, United States

- U.S. National Register of Historic Places
- U.S. Historic district
- Virginia Landmarks Register
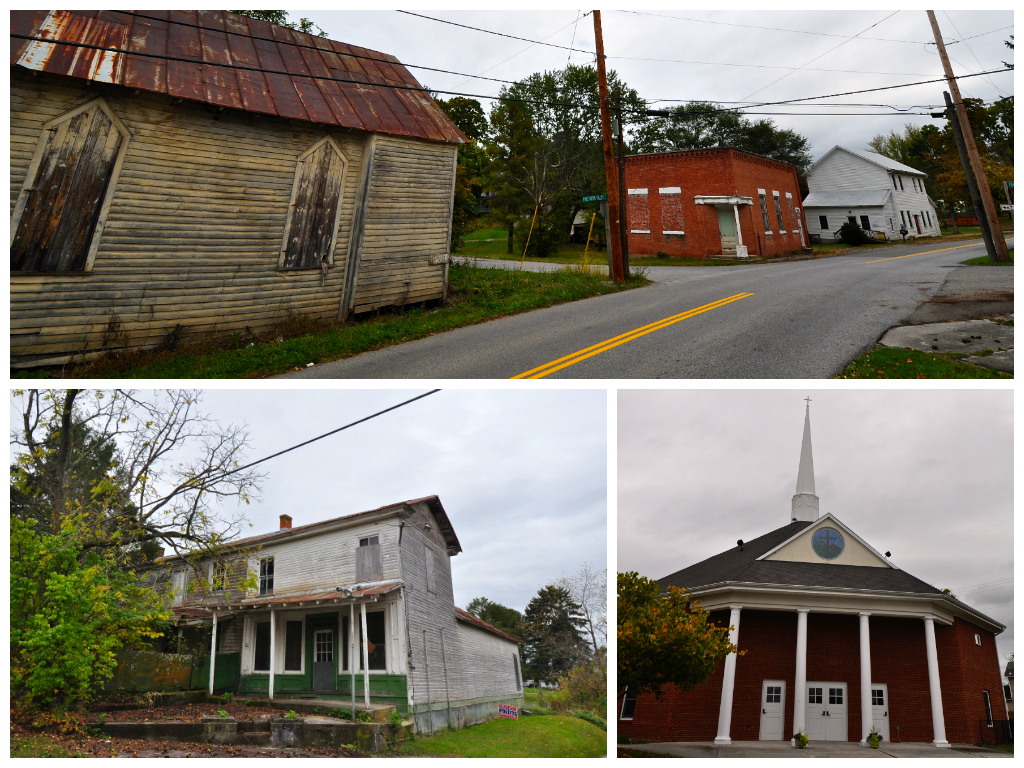

- Location within Virginia Location within the United States
- Location: Roughly, E and S of jct. of Main St. and Franklin Sts., Riner, Virginia
- Coordinates: 37°3′57″N 80°26′23″W
- Area: 22 acres (8.9 ha)
- Architectural style: Greek Revival, Center-passage plan
- MPS: Montgomery County MPS
- NRHP reference No.: 90002006
- VLR No.: 060-0044

Significant dates
- Added to NRHP: January 10, 1991
- Designated VLR: June 20, 1989

Riner Historic District is a national historic district located at Riner, Montgomery County, Virginia. The district encompasses 23 contributing buildings and 1 contributing structure in the village of Riner. It includes a variety of vernacular residential, commercial, and institutional buildings dating from the 1850s to 1920s. Notable buildings include the Methodist Episcopal Church (1908), Bank of Riner (1912–1913), Jonathan E. Hall House / Store, Kinsey-Lawrence House (1908–1909), Dr. Stone Farm, Surface Mill (c. 1910), Auburn United Methodist Church (1885), and Sam Barnett Store.

It was listed on the National Register of Historic Places in 1991.
