= Jermaine Hardy =

American football player (born 1982)

No. 29, 28
- Position: Safety

Personal information
- Born: March 20, 1982 (age 44); Roanoke, Virginia, U.S.
- Listed height: 5 ft 10 in (1.78 m)
- Listed weight: 213 lb (97 kg)

Career information
- High school: William Fleming (VA); Hargrave Military Academy (VA)
- College: Virginia
- NFL draft: 2005: undrafted

Career history
- Arizona Cardinals (2005) *; Carolina Panthers (2005-2006); Rhein Fire (2007); San Francisco 49ers (2007) *; Carolina Panthers (2007) *

Career NFL statistics
- Games played: 3
- Stats at Pro Football Reference

Melvin Jermaine Hardy (born March 20, 1982) is an American former professional football player who was a safety for the Carolina Panthers of the National Football League (NFL). He played college football for the Virginia Cavaliers.
