= Linton Townes =

American basketball player

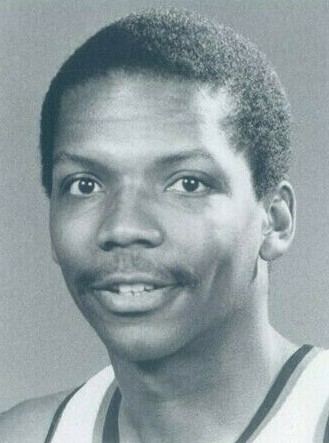

Personal information
- Born: November 30, 1959 (age 66) Richmond, Virginia, U.S.
- Listed height: 6 ft 7 in (2.01 m)
- Listed weight: 190 lb (86 kg)

Career information
- High school: Covington (Covington, Virginia)
- College: James Madison (1978–1982)
- NBA draft: 1982: 2nd round, 33rd overall pick
- Drafted by: Portland Trail Blazers
- Playing career: 1982–1999
- Position: Small forward / shooting guard
- Number: 2, 22, 9

Career history
- 1982–1983: Portland Trail Blazers
- 1983: Milwaukee Bucks
- 1983: Lancaster Lightning
- 1983–1984: San Diego Clippers
- 1984–1985: Tampa Bay Thrillers
- 1985: San Antonio Spurs
- 1985–1986: Real Madrid
- 1986–1987: BSC Saturn Köln
- 1987–1989: Hapoel Tel Aviv
- 1989-1991: ALM Evreux
- 1991–1992: Saint-Quentin
- 1992–1993: Maccabi Rishon LeZion
- 1993–1994: OAR Ferrol
- 1994–1997: TDK Manresa
- 1997–1998: Breogán Lugo
- 1998–1999: Cabitel Gijón

Career highlights
- CBA champion (1985); All-CBA Second Team (1985)
- Stats at NBA.com
- Stats at Basketball Reference

Linton Rodney Townes (born November 30, 1959) is an American former professional basketball player. He was a 6-foot-7-inch (201 cm) 190 pounds (86 kg) swingman from Richmond, Virginia, he played collegiately at James Madison University from 1978 to 1982. At James Madison, he helped lead the Dukes to their first NCAA tournament in program history. He played for four National Basketball Association (NBA) teams. He also starred in high school at Covington High School in Covington, Virginia. Covington is also the same city where fellow NBA alum Bimbo Coles was born.

After college, Townes was selected by the Portland Trail Blazers with the 10th pick in the second round of the 1982 NBA draft. In his first season (1982–83) he played 55 games for the Blazers, averaging 4.5 points and 1.2 rebounds per game. His final two seasons were split between Milwaukee Bucks, Los Angeles Clippers, and San Antonio Spurs.

After being waived from the Spurs early in the 1984–85 season, he played for the Tampa Bay Thrillers of the Continental Basketball Association (CBA) and was selected to the All-CBA Second Team in 1985. He won a CBA championship with the Thrillers in 1985. Townes moved to Europe and Israel where he played the remainder of his career, notably in Germany, Spain, France and Israel before retiring in 1999. In France he played for two years for the ALM Évreux in Pro B and in Israel he played for Hapoel Tel Aviv.

== Career statistics ==
Legend
GP	Games played	GS	Games started	MPG	Minutes per game
FG%	Field goal percentage	3P%	3-point field goal percentage	FT%	Free throw percentage
RPG	Rebounds per game	APG	Assists per game	SPG	Steals per game
BPG	Blocks per game	PPG	Points per game	**Bold**	Career high

=== NBA ===
==== Regular season ====
Year	Team	GP	GS	MPG	FG%	3P%	FT%	RPG	APG	SPG	BPG	PPG
1982–83	Portland	**55**	0	**9.4**	.449	**.360**	.737	**1.2**	**0.6**	0.3	0.1	**4.5**
1983-84	Milwaukee	2	0	1.0	**1.000**	.000	.000	0.0	0.0	0.0	0.0	1.0
1983–84	San Diego	2	0	8.5	.429	.000	.000	0.5	0.5	**0.5**	**1.0**	3.0
1984–85	San Antonio	1	0	8.0	.000	.000	**1.000**	1.0	0.0	0.0	0.0	2.0
Career		60	0	9.1	.440	.360	.750	1.1	0.5	0.3	0.1	4.3

==== Playoffs ====
Year	Team	GP	GS	MPG	FG%	3P%	FT%	RPG	APG	SPG	BPG	PPG
1982-83	Portland	**6**	-	**10.0**	.481	**.333**	**.857**	0.5	**0.8**	0.0	0.0	**5.5**
1984–85	San Antonio	2	0	3.0	**.500**	.000	.000	**1.5**	0.0	0.0	0.0	4.0
Career		8	0	8.3	.486	.250	.857	0.8	0.6	0.0	0.0	5.1

=== College ===
Year	Team	GP	GS	MPG	FG%	3P%	FT%	RPG	APG	SPG	BPG	PPG
1978–79	James Madison	26	25	29.4	**.563**	-	.743	4.2	1.9	0.9	0.3	11.6
1979–80	James Madison	10	10	32.2	.558	-	.667	5.2	**2.5**	0.7	**1.2**	14.6
1980–81	James Madison	29	29	32.6	.558	-	.718	5.8	2.0	0.8	0.9	15.3
1981–82	James Madison	**30**	**30**	**35.5**	.552	-	**.797**	**5.9**	2.0	**1.1**	0.6	**16.3**
Career		95	94	32.6	.557	-	.749	5.3	2.0	0.9	0.7	14.5
