= Pete Johnson (American football, born 1937) =

American football player (born 1937)

No. 20
- Position: Fullback

Personal information
- Born: August 9, 1937 (age 89); Bedford, Virginia, U.S.
- Listed height: 6 ft 2 in (1.88 m)
- Listed weight: 200 lb (91 kg)

Career information
- High school: William Fleming (VA)
- College: VMI
- NFL draft: 1959: 3rd round, 32nd overall pick

Career history
- Chicago Bears (1959); Dallas Cowboys (1960)*
- * Offseason or practice squad member only

Career NFL statistics
- Games played: 7
- Stats at Pro Football Reference

Peter Thomas Johnson Jr. (born August 9, 1937) is an American former professional football player who was a halfback for the Chicago Bears of the National Football League (NFL). He played college football for the VMI Keydets.

== Early life ==
Johnson attended William Fleming High School. He accepted a football scholarship from the Virginia Military Institute. As a sophomore, he contracted Polio but was able to recover. He registered 41 carries for 221 yards (5.4-yard avg.), 3 rushing touchdowns and 2 receptions for 17 yards.

As a junior, he was a backup at halfback, posting 63 carries for 270 yards (4.3-yard avg.), 5 receptions for 40 yards, 2 receiving touchdowns, 8-of-9 extra point conversions, 2 defensive touchdowns and a 39.5 punting average. He contributed to the team having an undefeated season (9-0-1) and being ranked 13th in the final Associated Press poll. He made all 3 extra point conversions in the 21-21 tie against the College of the Holy Cross.

As a senior, he became a starter at fullback after Sam Woolwine graduated. He was second on the team behind Sam Horner, with 78 carries for 392 yards (5.0-yard avg.) and 5 rushing touchdowns. He set a school record, by returning a kickoff for a 97-yard touchdown against Villanova University.

In 1979, he was inducted into the VMI Sports Hall of Fame.

== Professional career ==
=== Chicago Bears ===
Johnson was selected by the Chicago Bears in the third round (32nd overall) of the 1959 NFL draft. He appeared in seven games as a halfback.

=== Dallas Cowboys ===
In 1960, Johnson was selected by the Dallas Cowboys in the expansion draft. He was converted into a defensive back during training camp. He was released on August 30.
