= Manassas Park, Virginia =

Independent city in Virginia, United States

- Independent city
- City of Manassas Park
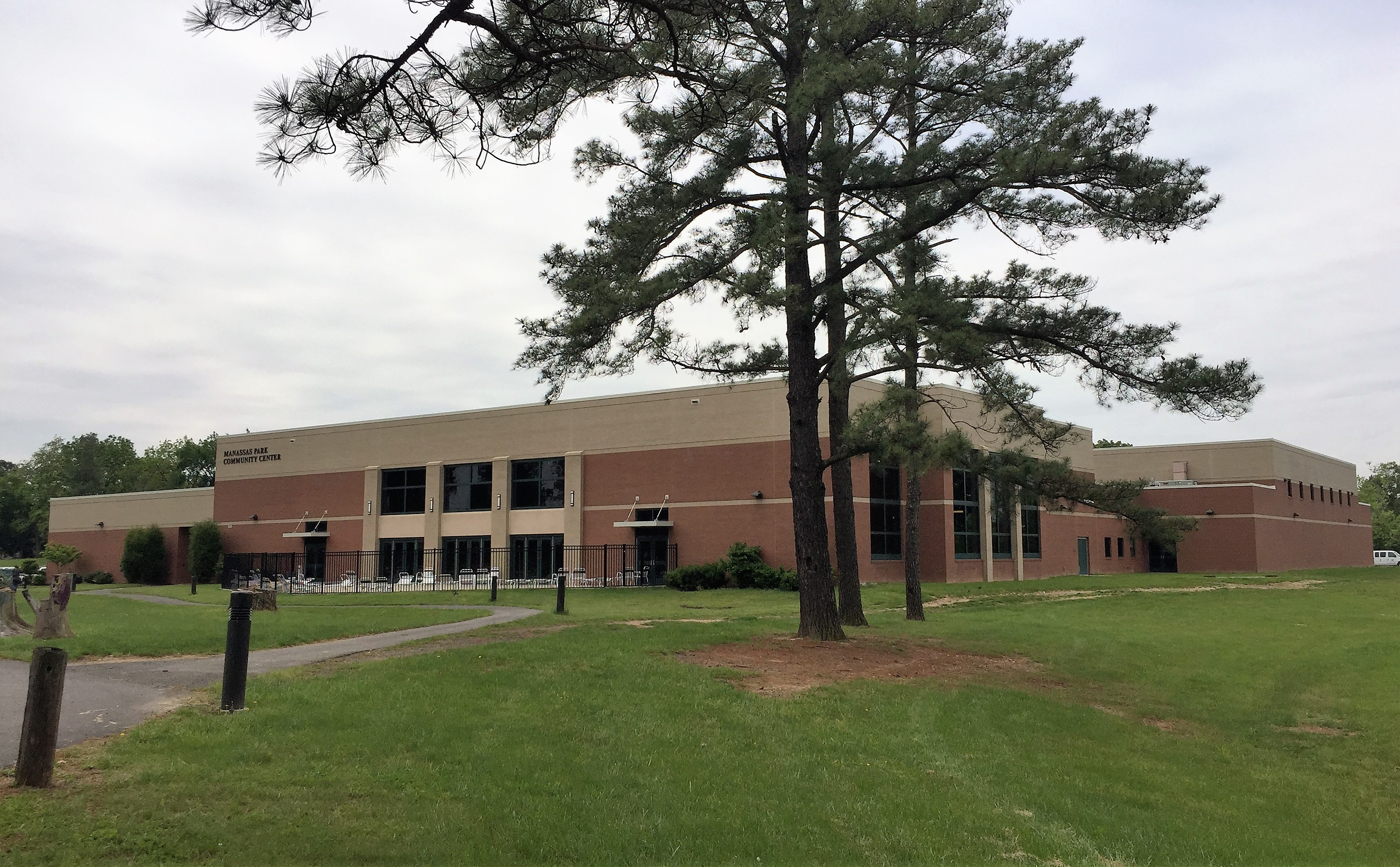
- Manassas Park community center

- Flag Seal Logo
- Interactive map of Manassas Park, Virginia
- Location within Virginia Location within the United States
- Coordinates: 38°46′19″N 77°27′09″W
- Country: United States
- State: Virginia
- Pre-incorporation County: Prince William County (None after Incorporation - Independent city)
- Incorporated: 1975
- Named for: Manassas, Virginia

Government
  - Mayor: Alanna Mensing

Area
  - Total: 3.03 sq mi (7.86 km^{2})
  - Land: 3.03 sq mi (7.86 km^{2})
  - Water: 0 sq mi (0.00 km^{2})

Population (2020)
  - Total: 17,219
  - Estimate (2025): 16,560 ▼
  - Density: 5,682.84/sq mi (2,194.16/km^{2})
- Time zone: UTC-5
  - Summer (DST): UTC-4
- Zip Code: 20111
- FIPS code: 51-48968
- GNIS feature ID: 1495894

Manassas Park is an independent city in the U.S. state of Virginia. As of the 2020 census, the population was 17,219. Manassas Park is bordered by the city of Manassas and Prince William County. Manassas Park is a part of the Washington-Arlington-Alexandria, DC-VA-MD-WV Metropolitan Statistical Area.

== History ==
During the American Civil War, the Manassas Park area was used as a campsite by the Confederate States Army during both the First and Second Battles of Bull Run.

Manassas Park was created as a subdivision of Prince William County, with the first houses being constructed in 1955. In 1957, Manassas Park was incorporated as a town. Approximately 600 acres of land was annexed by the town of Manassas Park in 1974, and the town was incorporated as a city independent from the county the next year in 1975. Since then, it has been Virginia's newest city.

== Geography ==
Manassas Park is located at 38°46′19″N 77°27′09″W (38.771944, -77.45250). It is roughly dumbbell-shaped and lies to the south of Bull Run. It is longest NW–SE along Manassas Drive, and is bisected by Virginia State Route 28 at its narrowest section.

According to the United States Census Bureau, the city has a total area of 2.5 square miles (6.5 km^{2}), all land.

=== Adjacent county / Independent city ===
- Prince William County - north, east, south
- Manassas - west, southwest

== Demographics ==
Historical population
Census	Pop.	Note	%±
1960	5,342		—
1970	6,844		28.1%
1980	6,524		−4.7%
1990	6,734		3.2%
2000	10,290		52.8%
2010	14,273		38.7%
2020	17,219		20.6%
2025 (est.)	16,560	▼	−3.8%
U.S. Decennial Census; 1790–1960 1900–1990; 1990–2000 2010–2020

=== Racial and ethnic composition ===
Manassas Park city, Virginia – Racial and ethnic composition Note: the US Census treats Hispanic/Latino as an ethnic category. This table excludes Latinos from the racial categories and assigns them to a separate category. Hispanics/Latinos may be of any race.
Race / Ethnicity (NH = Non-Hispanic)	Pop 1980	Pop 1990	Pop 2000	Pop 2010	Pop 2020	% 1980	% 1990	% 2000	% 2010	% 2020
White alone (NH)	6,078	5,760	6,919	6,070	4,706	93.16%	85.54%	67.24%	42.53%	27.33%
Black or African American alone (NH)	286	481	1,115	1,784	2,076	4.38%	7.14%	10.84%	12.50%	12.06%
Native American or Alaska Native alone (NH)	17	7	38	31	27	0.26%	0.10%	0.37%	0.22%	0.16%
Asian alone (NH)	27	167	413	1,261	1,827	0.41%	2.48%	4.01%	8.83%	10.61%
Native Hawaiian or Pacific Islander alone (NH)	x	x	5	17	13	x	x	0.05%	0.12%	0.08%
Other race alone (NH)	19	5	28	48	133	0.29%	0.07%	0.27%	0.34%	0.77%
Mixed race or Multiracial (NH)	x	x	228	417	638	x	x	2.22%	2.92%	3.71%
Hispanic or Latino (any race)	97	314	1,544	4,645	7,799	1.49%	4.66%	15.00%	32.54%	45.29%
Total	6,524	6,734	10,290	14,273	17,219	100.00%	100.00%	100.00%	100.00%	100.00%

=== 2020 census ===
As of the 2020 census, Manassas Park had a population of 17,219. The median age was 33.2 years. 26.2% of residents were under the age of 18 and 7.8% of residents were 65 years of age or older. For every 100 females there were 99.4 males, and for every 100 females age 18 and over there were 98.3 males age 18 and over.

100.0% of residents lived in urban areas, while 0.0% lived in rural areas.

There were 5,381 households in Manassas Park, of which 43.9% had children under the age of 18 living in them. Of all households, 48.5% were married-couple households, 18.9% were households with a male householder and no spouse or partner present, and 25.0% were households with a female householder and no spouse or partner present. About 22.2% of all households were made up of individuals and 5.1% had someone living alone who was 65 years of age or older.

There were 5,525 housing units, of which 2.6% were vacant. The homeowner vacancy rate was 0.5% and the rental vacancy rate was 3.2%.

Racial composition as of the 2020 census
Race	Number	Percent
White	5,535	32.1%
Black or African American	2,136	12.4%
American Indian and Alaska Native	174	1.0%
Asian	1,835	10.7%
Native Hawaiian and Other Pacific Islander	13	0.1%
Some other race	5,263	30.6%
Two or more races	2,263	13.1%
Hispanic or Latino (of any race)	7,799	45.3%

=== 2000 census ===
At the 2000 census there were 10,290 people, 3,254 households and 2,557 families in the city. The population density was 4,129.0 inhabitants per square mile (1,594.2/km^{2}). There were 3,365 housing units at an average density of 1,350.3 per square mile (521.4/km^{2}). The racial makeup of the city was 72.79% White, 11.17% African American, 0.44% Native American, 4.06% Asian, 0.07% Pacific Islander, 8.14% from other races, and 3.33% from two or more races. Hispanic or Latino of any race were 15.00%.

Of the 3,254 households 45.4% had children under the age of 18 living with them, 59.9% were married couples living together, 12.1% had a female householder with no husband present, and 21.4% were non-families. 14.4% of households were one person and 2.6% were one person aged 65 or older. The average household size was 3.16 and the average family size was 3.47.

The age distribution was 31.0% under the age of 18, 8.7% from 18 to 24, 40.1% from 25 to 44, 15.9% from 45 to 64, and 4.3% 65 or older. The median age was 30 years. For every 100 females, there were 103.8 males. For every 100 females age 18 and over, there were 103.0 males.

The median household income was $60,794 and the median family income was $61,075. Males had a median income of $38,643 versus $30,942 for females. The per capita income for the city was $21,048. About 4.7% of families and 5.2% of the population were below the poverty line, including 5.8% of those under age 18 and 11.2% of those age 65 or over.

In June 2021, U.S. News & World Report ranked Manassas Park with the fifth best life expectancy in the United States at 92.5 years old.

== Education ==
The city is served by Manassas Park City Schools, with a total of four schools: Cougar Elementary, Manassas Park Elementary, Manassas Park Middle, and Manassas Park High School. There are also private schools.

== Transportation ==
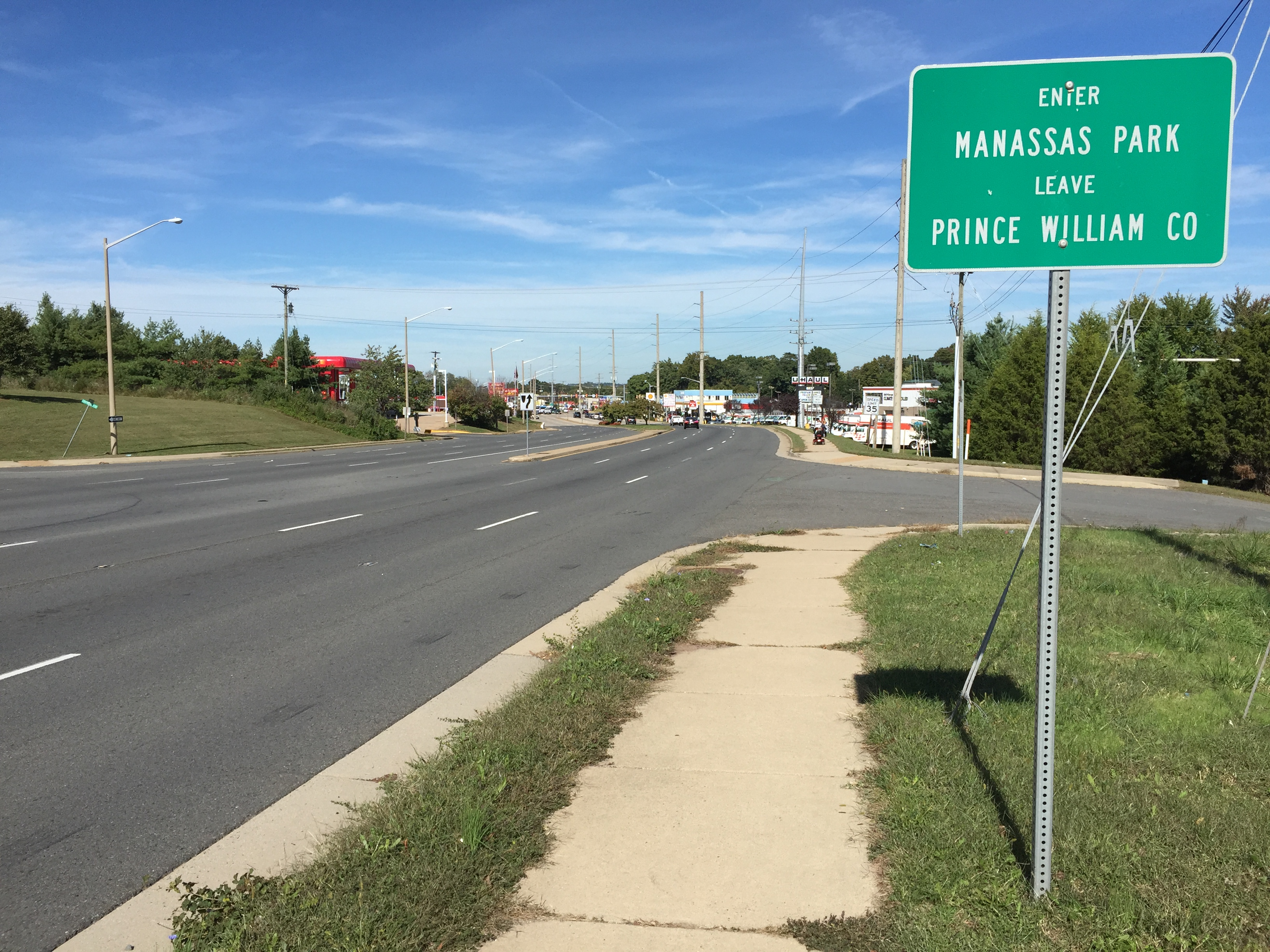
Route 28 entering Manassas Park

Virginia State Route 28 is the main highway serving the city. From Manassas Park, SR 28 extends north to Interstate 66 and south to Virginia State Route 234, providing connections to major cities through the region.

Virginia State Route 213 follows Manassas Drive, serving as a main roadway within Manassas Park. However, the route designation is unsigned.

The city is home to Manassas Park station located on the Manassas Line of the Virginia Railway Express.

== Government ==
Manassas Park has supported every Democratic nominee since 2008. It voted for every Republican nominee between 1980 and 2004 while voting for the Democratic nominee in 1976, which was the first election held under independent city status.

United States presidential election results for Manassas Park, Virginia
Year	Republican		Democratic		Third party(ies)	
Year	No.	%	No.	%	No.	%
1976	444	37.34%	709	59.63%	36	3.03%
1980	729	58.13%	447	35.65%	78	6.22%
1984	975	71.96%	375	27.68%	5	0.37%
1988	993	68.67%	434	30.01%	19	1.31%
1992	792	46.05%	567	32.97%	361	20.99%
1996	916	49.84%	748	40.70%	174	9.47%
2000	1,460	56.59%	1,048	40.62%	72	2.79%
2004	1,807	54.23%	1,498	44.96%	27	0.81%
2008	1,634	39.47%	2,463	59.49%	43	1.04%
2012	1,699	36.49%	2,879	61.83%	78	1.68%
2016	1,733	33.12%	3,204	61.24%	295	5.64%
2020	1,979	32.51%	3,992	65.58%	116	1.91%
2024	2,314	38.59%	3,506	58.46%	177	2.95%

== Notable people ==
- Johnny Micheal Spann (1969–2001), was an employee of the Central Intelligence Agency (CIA) and the first American killed in combat after the U.S. invasion of Afghanistan.
