= Howard–Bell–Feather House =

Historic home near Riner, Montgomery County, Virginia, US

- U.S. National Register of Historic Places
- Virginia Landmarks Register
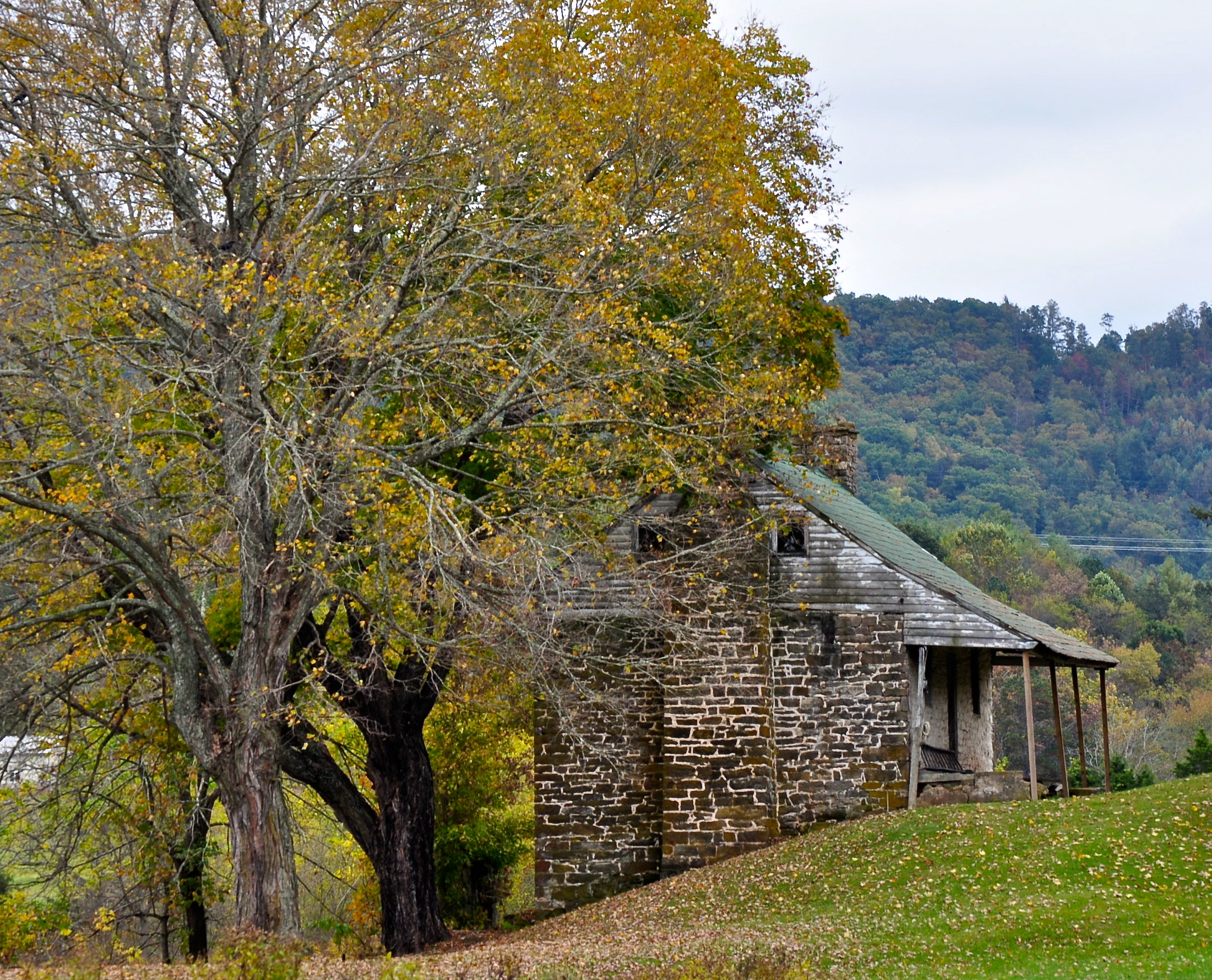
- Howard–Bell–Feather House, October 2013

- Location within Virginia Location within the United States
- Location: VA 657, 0.5 miles (0.80 km) south of VA 685, near Riner, Virginia
- Coordinates: 37°4′1″N 80°24′32″W
- Area: less than one acre
- Built: c. 1810
- Architectural style: Three-room plan
- MPS: Montgomery County MPS
- NRHP reference No.: 89001887
- VLR No.: 060-0024

Significant dates
- Added to NRHP: November 13, 1989
- Designated VLR: June 20, 1989

Howard–Bell–Feather House, also known as Bell–Feather House and old Feather's place, is a historic home near Riner, Montgomery County, Virginia, United States. It was built about 1810, and is a one- to two-story, three-bay, banked stone dwelling with a three-room plan. Also on the property is a contributing small frame house dated to the early-20th century.

It was listed on the National Register of Historic Places in 1989.
