= Pulaski County High School (Virginia) =

Location
- 5414 Cougar Trail; Dublin, Virginia 24084; United States; 37°5′13.6″N 80°42′56.8″W

Information
- School type: Public, high school
- Established: 1974
- Locale: Town, Distant
- School district: Pulaski County Public Schools
- NCES District ID: 5103150
- Superintendent: Rob Graham
- NCES School ID: 510315001338
- Principal: Jennifer Bolling
- Teaching staff: 96.00 (on an FTE basis)
- Grades: 9–12
- Enrollment: 1,159 (2024–25)
- Student to teacher ratio: 12.07
- Language: English
- Colors: Burgundy and Gold
- Athletics conference: Virginia High School League; Division 4 A Conference 24 North; River Ridge District
- Nickname: Cougars
- Rival: Radford High School; Blacksburg High School; Christiansburg High School; Salem High School
- Website: Official Site

Pulaski County High School (commonly PCHS) is a public secondary school located at 5414 Cougar Trail Road in Dublin, Virginia, about 45 miles southwest of Roanoke, Virginia. It is the sole public high school in Pulaski County, Virginia, and is accredited by the Southern Association of Colleges and Schools.

== History ==
Pulaski County High School opened in 1974 with the consolidation of Dublin High School in Dublin and Pulaski High School in Pulaski.

== Academics ==
Pulaski County High School is a comprehensive high school which includes grades 9th through 12th and is part of the Pulaski County Public School Division. As of the 2011–2012 school year, the school had an enrollment of 1,420 students. The school has 98.67 classroom teachers (on an FTE basis), for a student-teacher ratio of 14.4.

Pulaski County High School operates on an 8:30 a.m. to 3:20 p.m. schedule, which includes four class blocks and three lunch blocks scheduled throughout the day.

Pulaski County High School offers 9 Advanced Placement courses: English Language and Composition, English Literature and Composition, Art History, Studio Art, Calculus, Environmental Science, U.S. Government and Politics, U.S. History, and Psychology. The school also features an on-site Career and Technical Education Center, which offers a number of vocational courses in the fields of: agriculture, business, marketing, early childhood education, fashion, nutrition and wellness, culinary arts, nursing, construction and building trades, computer aided design, auto repair, cosmetology, electricity, video production, and welding.

The Southwest Virginia Governor's School (SWVGS) was located on the Pulaski County High School campus until the 2006-2007 school year when it was relocated to the former Northwood Elementary School, in the town of Pulaski. Then, it was relocated again in the Summer of 2023 to the New River Community College campus, after PCPS notified the school in October 2022 that it would need to vacate the Northwood building by June 30, 2023.

== Athletics and Extracurriculars ==
=== Football ===
Pulaski County High School is a member of the Virginia High School League and competes in the AA River Ridge District, a district in Region IV of Group AA. From 1974 to 1975, Pulaski County High School competed in the AAA Western District, before entering the newly formed AAA Roanoke Valley District. As a member of the Roanoke Valley District and the Northwest Region, Pulaski County defeated Thomas Dale High School to capture the Group AAA, Division 6 football state championship in 1992 under the direction of former West Virginia University assistant Joel Hicks.

In 1993, Pulaski County was ranked as one of the top 25 high school football teams in the country by USA Today for most of the season. The Cougars won their first 13 games, but star player Eric Webb was injured in the state semi-final and was unable to play in the state championship which the Cougars lost to Annandale High School. In 2001, Pulaski County dropped down to the Group AA Blue Ridge District. That year, the Cougar football team, which had returned most players from a 2000 Group AAA, Division 5 state semi-finalist, advanced to the Group AA, Division 4 state championship before falling to Lafayette High School.

In 2008, Pulaski County High School had a perfect 10–0 regular season, winning the River Ridge District in the process. The Cougars shut out both Blacksburg and Salem to win the Region IV, Division 4 title. Pulaski County was subsequently defeated in the AA, Division 4 state semifinals by Amherst County, by a 13–7 score.

Pulaski County has also produced such well-known athletes and coaches such as: former Washington Redskins receiver Gary Clark, New Orleans Saints kicker Shayne Graham, former Dallas Cowboys and Georgia Bulldogs football and current Louisville Cardinals defensive coordinator Todd Grantham, and Carolina Panthers and Virginia Tech star player Jeff King.

- Coaching Records
- 1974–1978 – Dave Brown 14–33–3 (.310); No playoffs
- 1979–2002 – Joel Hicks 210–69 (.753); 15 District Titles (once won 7 in a row 1991–1997), 6 Regional Titles; 1 State Title. 23–15 record in the playoffs.
- 2003–2009 – Jack Turner 42–33 (.560); 1 District Title, 1 Regional Title. 2–3 record in the playoffs
- 2010–2013 – Todd Jones 16–28 (.367); 0–2 record in the playoffs.
- 2014–2019 – Stephen James 44–23 (.657); 0–5 record in the playoffs
- 2020–2021 – Mark Dixon 8–9 (.471); 0–1 record in playoffs
- 2022–present – Cam Akers 1–1 (.500)

=== Basketball ===
Pulaski County High School has had several successful Boys' Basketball teams. During the late 1970s into the early 1980s, Pulaski County High School's Boys Basketball Team under the direction of Coach Allen Wiley, won several Roanoke Valley District Titles and the Northwest Region Titles. In the early 1980s, Pulaski County's Basketball Team was led by Michael Porter, who had won several state awards, and had played in the United States High School All-Star team.

In 2004, the Cougar Basketball team under the direction of Coach Mark Hanks journeyed to the Group AA playoffs for the first time since the early 1990s. In 2005, the Cougars captured the 2005 River Ridge District title and advanced to the 2005 playoffs. In 2006, the Cougars made another Group AA playoff run. Hanks took two years off while serving solely as the athletic director, he returned to the court in 2011 to coach the men's team.

Andrew Hart took over coaching responsibilities after the 2013–14 season. After five seasons, Hart resigned and Tyler Cannoy was named the head coach shortly after.

The PCHS Lady Cougars experienced several accomplishments during the 2007–2008 season. Particularly on January 1, 2008, at 7:30 p.m. the Lady Cougars defeated the River Ridge District number one ranked team the Hidden Valley Titans. Led by coach Brenda King, the Lady Cougars snapped the Hidden Valley High School (Virginia) Titans' 38 game winning streak.

- The lady cougars are currently coached by Scott Ratcliff.

The school also does a Senior vs Faculty basketball game every year, in which the proceeds go to the charity of the winning team's choice.

=== Cheerleading ===
- The PCHS Competition Cheerleading Squad has fared well over the past few years, reaching the VHSL AA State Cheer Competition in 2008, 2009, 2010 and 2012 (under the leadership of Coach Roxanne Thompson). In those same years, the squad also received three grand championships at invitationals (2010 - Amherst Cheer Invitational, 2010 - Battle at Byrd, 2012 - Stinger Cheer Challenge).
- Past Competition Cheer Accomplishments include winning the Blue Ridge District Cheer Title in 2001 (under Angie Harrell, who was later charged with embezzlement from the team).

=== Drama ===
The Drama Department, under the direction of Mr. Jeff McCoy, has won 3 state drama championships; prior to this, the department, managed by its previous director, Rhonda Welsh, claimed an award of similar standing. The most recent award-winning piece You Don't Know Jack(2017) was an original musical written by both Mr. McCoy, and his students. Similarly, the original musical, The Other Side of the Story, about the villains of renowned fictional stories and their misjudged reputations, also won a State Championship; its script was written by Mr. McCoy, with assistance from students, with the music and arrangements written collaboratively by Josh O'Dell and Mr. McCoy.

The PCHS Drama Department has also performed at the American High School Theater Festival in Edinburgh, Scotland.

=== Band ===
The band program at Pulaski County High School has been a symbol of pride for the high school and residents of Pulaski County since the first notes were played in the fall of 1974. The program has received many awards ranging from marching band and concert ensembles to the indoor winter performing groups. The instrumental program at PCHS has produced thousands musicians over the years. It has been through the efforts of those musicians that the program at PCHS has been named a Virginia Honor Band thirteen times. Emphasis on hard work and musicianship is what makes the Golden Cougar Band "The Pride of Pulaski County." The band is under the direction of Mr. Kevin Faller. (Updated 2022)

=== MACC ===
The school's Math MACC (under Ming Chan) Super MACC and Little League MACC (Mountain Academic Competition Conference) Team won 1st place at Super MACC, the MACC Championship in 2005. The school also sports award-winning Social Studies, Science, English, and All-Around Teams.

The All-Around team won a Super MACC championship in 2007, and the Science team went on to Super MACC after finishing second in the tournament. Social Studies finished second in the regular season, but did not go on to Super MACC. However, in 2014 Social Studies won the Super MACC championship.

=== Chess ===
Pulaski County High School also has a strong tradition in chess which culminated in the mid to late 1980s. In 1985, Pulaski County finished in second place in the national championships only 0.5 points behind the first place team. In 1987, Pulaski County hosted the national championship. The Cougars also captured the Virginia Scholastic State Chess Championship in 1998.

=== Cross Country ===
During the 2006–2007 school year, Pulaski County High School produced a girls' cross country team that successfully came in first place in the following meets: Run fer da Hills, Blue Demon Invitational, Tusculum Invitational. They also came in second during the Bristol Cross Invitational and River Ridge District Meet. The second-place finish at the River Ridge District Meet allowed them to continue as a team to the Region III meet. The girls' team advanced to the state meet for the first time in PCHS history.

In 1978, the boys' cross country team under Coach David Wright won the Roanoke Valley District title with a 10–0 record. The District final was held at Pulaski's home course. This was the first district title won by a PCHS sports team.

=== Track & Field ===
During the 2005 Outdoor Track season, Leslie Anderson led the girls' track team to a River Ridge District title, Region III title, and third-place team finish at the AA State Championships. Ms. Anderson won the 400 meters and Long Jump and finished in the runner-up spot in the 100 and 200 meter dashes. Anderson was All-State 10 times in her high school career and won two individual state titles.(400m and Long Jump in 2005). During the 2009-10 Indoor and Outdoor track season Amber Church, led the Cougar's to never before seen levels of success. The Cougar's captured a 4th place at the Indoor State AA Championships, 2nd in the River Ridge District, won the Region IV Championship and 3rd place at the AA State Championships. She scored 40 points at the Indoor State meet and followed that up with 39 points at the Outdoor State meet. Ms. Church ended her career as the most successful female athlete in Pulaski County High School history, with 19 All-State honors, 6 State Championships (100H(2), 55H, 300H, High Jump, Long Jump) and 5 State Runners-up, to go along with 37 All-District honors and 34 All-Region honors and 2 Time Roanoke Time All-Timesland Track Athlete of the Year.

Other All-State Girls include: Brenna Blevins, 7 times All-state in the 300m dash, High Jump, and Long jump from 2000 to 2003. Alfreda Harder, All-state in 2003 in the Shot Put. Liz Hager was the 2002 state champion in the discus and All-State in 2001. Nikki Roseberry, All-State in High Jump in 2005. Sabrina Hall, 6 times All-State in the 1600m and 3200m from 2006 to 2008. All-State Boys include: Michael Casseri who was the 2002 State runner up in Discuss. Keivon Payne in 2003 in the 300H. Brandon Anderson was 4 times from 2003 to 2004 in the 400m and Long Jump, was state runner-up in long jump in 2004. Thomas Doolittle in 2004 in the 500m. Lance McDaniel in 2004 and 2005 3 times in the 1600m and 3200m. Andrew Hart in 2005 in High Jump. and Josh Crowder in 2006 twice in the 800m and 1000m.

On March 4, 2025 Cole Boone broke the US High School national record in the 1000m clocking a time of 2:20.14, breaking the previous record of 2:22.28 set by Robbie Andrews in 2009.

== Notable alumni ==
- Gary Clark, former NFL player
- Shayne Graham, former NFL player
- Jeff King, former NFL player
