= Darrius Bratton =

American gridiron football player (born 1997)

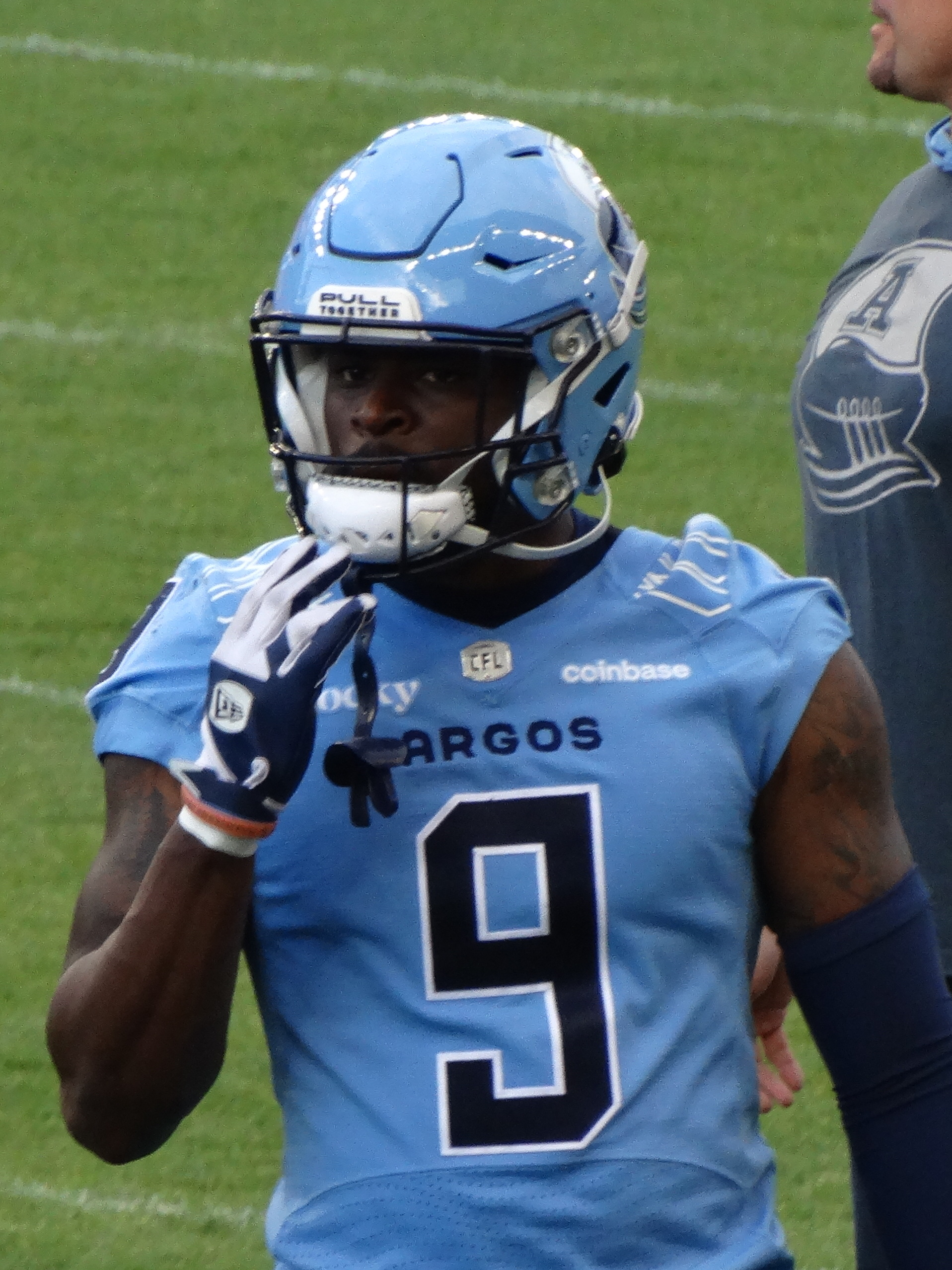
- Bratton with the Toronto Argonauts in 2025

Profile
- Position: Defensive back

Personal information
- Born: August 2, 1997 (age 29); Roanoke, Virginia, U.S.
- Listed height: 6 ft 0 in (1.83 m)
- Listed weight: 200 lb (91 kg)

Career information
- High school: William Fleming (Roanake)
- College: Virginia
- NFL draft: 2023: undrafted

Career history
- 2023–2024: Edmonton Elks
- 2025: Toronto Argonauts
- Stats at CFL.ca

Darrius Bratton (born August 2, 1997) is an American professional football defensive back. He most recently played for the Toronto Argonauts of the Canadian Football League (CFL). He played college football at Virginia.

== Early life ==
Bratton played high school football at William Fleming High School in Roanoke, Virginia. He only played in three games his senior year due to a season-ending injury. After high school, he spent a year playing for Fork Union Military Academy.

== College career ==
Bratton played college football at Virginia from 2017 to 2022. He played in nine games in 2017 and made one tackle. He appeared in 13 games, starting five, in 2018, recording 16 tackles and seven pass breakups. Bratton did not play in 2019 after suffering a season-ending injury before the start of the regular season. He played in nine games during the COVID-19 shortened 2020 season, totaling 8 tackles and one pass breakup. He appeared in 12 games, starting six in 2021, accumulating 30 tackles and six pass breakups. Bratton played in nine games, starting three, in 2022, recording 22 tackles and half a sack.

== Professional career ==
=== Edmonton Elks ===
Bratton was signed by the Edmonton Elks on May 17, 2023. He started all 18 games for the Elks during his rookie year in 2023, totaling 44 tackles on defense and one interception. He became a free agent upon the expiry of his contract on February 11, 2025.

=== Toronto Argonauts ===
On February 11, 2025, it was announced that Bratton had signed with the Toronto Argonauts. He played in 16 regular season games where he had 37 defensive tackles. He was released in the following offseason on January 19, 2026.
