= River Ridge District =

Virginia high school district

The AA River Ridge District is a district in Region IV of the Virginia High School League in the US state of Virginia. It is centered around the Roanoke Valley and New River Valley in Southwest Virginia.

== History ==
The River Ridge District was formed for the 2003–2004 school year out of the AA Blue Ridge District in Region III. In the 2002–2003 school year, the student body of Group AAA Cave Spring High School in Roanoke County was split into two Group AA sized schools with the opening of Hidden Valley High School. These two new schools gave the Blue Ridge District eleven members that year except in football, where Cave Spring remained in AAA and Hidden Valley played a limited, solely non-district schedule. The district was separated for the 2003–2004 school year when both schools played a full schedule as AA members.

The assignment of schools to the two districts was not without controversy. The Roanoke County school board wanted all of its schools to be in the Blue Ridge District. However, other schools objected because this alignment would have created a competitive imbalance in football with the prospective River Ridge District having stronger teams than the Blue Ridge District. Eventually, a compromise sent the two southwest Roanoke County schools to the River Ridge and William Fleming High School of Roanoke, Virginia to the Blue Ridge.

In the 2007–2008 school year, the River Ridge District was moved into Region IV because many of the former Group AA member schools in the region had lost enrollment and dropped into Group A. The Blue Ridge District remained in Region III.

The River Ridge District was preserved in the 2013-2014 VSHL reclassification. Patrick Henry High School in Roanoke and Carroll County High School in Hillsville joined the district. This made it so the District included schools from group classifications 3A to 6A. Each school will compete only against members of the same group classification in post-season play. Carroll County left in 2017, joining the Three Rivers District.

== Geographic makeup ==
The River Ridge District is located in Southwest Virginia. It takes its name from member schools being located in the Blue Ridge Mountains and in close proximity to the Roanoke River and New River. The district currently includes two schools located in Roanoke County, two in Montgomery County, and one each in Roanoke City, Pulaski County, and Salem City.

== Regional and state competition ==
While the VHSL uses District formatting for regular season contests and determining postseason eligibility, the teams are divided into different classes and regions for Regional and State-level competitions. As such, River Ridge District members compete in the following formats (as of 2024):

- Class 5, Region C (Patrick Henry)
- Class 4, Region D (Blacksburg, Salem)
- Class 3, Region D (Cave Spring, Christiansburg, Hidden Valley, Pulaski County)

== Member schools ==
School	Location	Mascot	Colors	2022-23 9–12 enrollment
Blacksburg High School	Blacksburg	Bruins		1,321
Cave Spring High School	Roanoke	Knights		1,056
Christiansburg High School	Christiansburg	Blue Demons		1,116
Hidden Valley High School	Roanoke	Titans		1,022
Patrick Henry High School	Roanoke	Patriots		2,005
Pulaski County High School	Dublin	Cougars		1,246
Salem High School	Salem	Spartans		1,227

== Former members ==
School	Location	Mascot	Colors	2021-22 9–12 enrollment
Carroll County High School	Hillsville	Cavaliers		1,069
