= John St. Clair =

American football player (born 1977)

No. 70, 78
- Position: Offensive tackle

Personal information
- Born: July 15, 1977 (age 49); Roanoke, Virginia, U.S.
- Listed height: 6 ft 6 in (1.98 m)
- Listed weight: 320 lb (145 kg)

Career information
- High school: Fleming (Roanoke)
- College: Virginia
- NFL draft: 2000: 3rd round, 94th overall pick

Career history
- St. Louis Rams (2000–2003); Miami Dolphins (2004); Chicago Bears (2005–2008); Cleveland Browns (2009–2010)

Awards and highlights
- First-team All-American (1999); Jacobs Blocking Trophy (1999); First-team All-ACC (1999); Second-team All-ACC (1998); Virginia Cavaliers Jersey No. 50 retired

Career NFL statistics
- Games played: 132
- Games started: 79
- Receptions: 2
- Receiving yards: 20
- Receiving touchdowns: 1
- Stats at Pro Football Reference

John Bradley St. Clair (born July 15, 1977) is an American former professional football player who was an offensive tackle in the National Football League (NFL). He was selected by the St. Louis Rams in the third round of the 2000 NFL draft. He played college football for the Virginia Cavaliers.

St. Clair also played for the Miami Dolphins, Chicago Bears, and Cleveland Browns.

== Early life ==
St. Clair was an All-America selection by Super Prep following 1995 senior season at William Fleming High School in Roanoke, Virginia. St. Clair earned four letters at tight end and defensive tackle and was also named to the All-regional team by Blue Chip Illustrated and was rated as one of the top-25 players in Virginia. He also advanced to state finals in discus all four years and lettered twice in basketball.

== College career ==
St. Clair was a four-year letterman at the University of Virginia (1996–99) who started at center his final two years. He was named First-team All-America by College Football news and CNN/SI as a senior. He also won the Jacobs Blocking Trophy for the best blocker in the ACC in 1999. As a junior, started 10 games and was named Second-team All-ACC. He moved to the offensive line as a sophomore after playing as a reserve tight end during redshirt freshman season.

== Professional career ==
=== Pre-draft ===
St. Clair did 25 reps of 225 pounds on the bench press. He did not do the drills at the 2000 NFL Combine due to a quad injury. On his Pro Day at Virginia, he did 27 reps of 225 and ran a 5.08 40 yard dash.

=== St. Louis Rams ===
St. Clair was selected by the St. Louis Rams in the third round of the 2000 NFL draft. He was on the Rams roster in 2000 and 2001 but was inactive for all 32 games plus playoffs. In 2002 St. Clair started all 16 games for Rams, including 13 at right tackle and three at left tackle. In 2003, he played in all 16 regular season games and St. Louis’ lone playoff game as a reserve tackle and on special teams. He had an 18-yard reception from Marc Bulger at Cleveland (12/8/2003).

=== Miami Dolphins ===
On March 12, 2004, the Dolphins agreed to a two-year, $2.6 million contract with St. Clair, who was an unrestricted free agent. St. Clair started all 14 of his games played at right tackle during his lone season with Miami. The Dolphins released St. Clair on September 7, 2005.

=== Chicago Bears ===
After he was released by Miami, St. Clair signed with the Bears and played in the final 13 games of the regular season, including a start at each tackle position. The next season, Chicago signed St.Clair to a three-year $5 million contract and he played all 16 games for third time in his career, with two starts at left tackle for the Bears. He also played in all three postseason contests, including Super Bowl XLI against Indianapolis (2/4/07). In 2007, he saw action in all 16 games with the Bears, starting one contest at left tackle, one at right tackle and three at left guard. He scored the Bears’ first touchdown of the season on a two-yard pass from Rex Grossman vs. Kansas City (9/17). In 2008, he started all 16 games at left tackle for Chicago, marking the second time in his career that he opened all 16 contests and the fifth time in which he appeared in every regular season contest.

=== Cleveland Browns ===
St. Clair signed a three-year $9.1 million contract with the Cleveland Browns on March 17, 2009. He started the first 14 games at right tackle before being inactive for the final two games with an ankle injury. In 2010, St.Clair sustained a severe ankle injury and only started 11 games.

On February 9, 2011, the Browns released St. Clair.

=== Personal ===
St. Clair married Shannon St. Clair in 2002 in Ridgeway, Va. The couple have twins, John Jr. and Londen.
