= Lynne Agee =

American basketball coach

Biographical details
- Born: October 7, 1948 (age 78)
- Education: Longwood College (1971); Radford University (1981)

Coaching career (HC unless noted)
- 1971–1978: William Fleming HS
- 1978–1981: Roanoke
- 1981–2011: UNC Greensboro

Head coaching record
- Overall: 602–334 (.643) (AIAW/NCAA)

Lynne Agee (born October 7, 1948) is a retired women's college basketball coach. Agee started her coaching career with William Fleming High School, where she had 94 wins and 16 losses from 1971 to 1978. With the Roanoke Lady Maroons from 1978 to 1981, Agee had 46 wins and 23 losses. Her team also made it to the first round of the 1981 AIAW women's basketball tournament for Division III. With the UNC Greensboro Spartans women's basketball team from 1981 to 2011, Agee was the university's coach in Division III, Division II and Division I basketball.

During this time period, Agee and her team reached the final of the 1982 NCAA Division III women's basketball tournament and the regional finals of the 1991 NCAA Division II women's basketball tournament. Following their 1991 debut in Division I, Agee and UNC Greensboro appeared in the first round of the 2002 Women's National Invitation Tournament during the postseason. After leaving UNC Greensboro in March 2021 with 556 wins and 311 losses, Agee had a combined 602 wins and 334 losses in college basketball. Apart from basketball, Agee coached the UNC Greensboro team that placed second in the 1983 NCAA Women's Division III Tennis Championship. She also worked for the athletic director of UNC Greensboro and was an athletic administrator for the university.

== Early life and education ==
On October 7, 1948, Agee was born in Roanoke, Virginia. Agee was on the tennis, basketball and other sports teams at William Fleming High School. For her post-secondary education throughout the 1960s, 1970s, and 1980s, Agee went to Longwood College (bachelor's, 1971) and Radford University (master's, 1981). During her education, Agee studied physical education and educational administration for her degrees.

== Career ==
From 1971 to 1978, Agee started her basketball coaching experience with William Fleming. At the high school, Agee had 94 wins and 16 losses. While in charge of the sports held at William Fleming, Agee also taught tennis and volleyball as a coach. After leaving for Roanoke College in 1978, Agee coached the Roanoke Lady Maroons until 1981. During her 46 wins and 23 losses with Roanoke, Agee and her team reached the first round of the 1981 AIAW women's basketball tournament for Division III.

With the University of North Carolina-Greensboro, Agee joined the UNC Greensboro Spartans women's basketball team as their coach in 1981. As an NCAA Division III college, Agee and her team were defeated in the final of the 1982 NCAA Division III women's basketball tournament by Elizabethtown College. In 1984, she was in the top five for most Division III wins by coaches who were currently in charge of women's basketball teams. After the college's debut to NCAA Division II in 1988, Agee and the Spartans played at the 1991 NCAA Division II women's basketball tournament. In their only Division II tournament, the Spartans reached the regional finals.

In 1991, the Spartans became joined the NCAA Division I with Agee as their head coach. During her tenure, the Spartans played in the first round of the 2002 Women's National Invitation Tournament during the postseason. After winning her 600th overall college basketball game in February 2011, Agee had 556 wins and 311 losses with UNC Greensboro when she left the school the following month. With her combined totals at Roanoke and UNC Greensboro, Agee ended her college basketball career in March 2011 with 602 wins and 334 losses.

Outside of her basketball coach tenure, Agee was coach of the men's and women's tennis team for UNC Greensboro during the early 1980s. During her tennis career, Agee and UNC Greensboro were second at the 1983 NCAA Women's Division III Tennis Championship. She was a member of an executive group in 1984 that replaced the basketball used in women's basketball games held by the NCAA. For UNC Greensboro, Agee also became an athletic director assistant for the university in 1984. During the 1990s, Agee continued to work in her athletic director position for UNC Greensboro while also working as an administrator for the university's athletics department.

== Awards and honors ==
As a women's basketball coach with UNC Greensboro, Agee was coach of the year for the Dixie Intercollegiate Athletic Conference in 1982 before winning the award consecutively from 1986 to 1987. In 1988, Agee shared the coach of the year award with Lisa Stockton. For the 1992–93 season in the Big South Conference, Agee was named coach of the year alongside Rick Reeves.

As part of the Southern Conference, Agee was coach of the year in 1999 and 2002. In 2004, Agee was named into an Athletic Hall of Fame for UNC Greensboro. Other hall of fames Agee became part of were the Guilford County Hall of Fame in 2008 and the Southern Conference Hall of Fame in 2020. Agee had the basketball court at Bodford Arena named after her in 2011.

== See also ==
- List of college women's basketball career coaching wins leaders
