= Auburn High School (Virginia) =

Location
- 1650 Auburn School Drive; Riner, Virginia 24149; United States; 37°3′43.1″N 80°26′33.4″W

Information
- School type: Public, high school
- School district: Montgomery County Public Schools
- Superintendent: Bernard Bragen
- Principal: David Hurd
- Grades: 9–12
- Enrollment: 410 (2016–17)
- Language: English
- Colors: Blue and White
- Athletics conference: VHSL Class 1 VHSL Region C VHSL Mountain Empire District
- Mascot: Eagle

Located on State Route 8 in Riner, Virginia, United States, Auburn High School serves the communities of Riner and Pilot as well as a large area of southern Montgomery County. (Note: The school was referred to as Riner High School consistently in newspaper articles prior to 1928)

== History of school buildings in Riner, Virginia ==
The first school building in Riner was probably a one-room log cabin purchased in 1873. In the 1880s a two-room school was built, with a third room added later. In 1917, the school received accreditation as a senior high school. A third school was built in 1921, this one with four rooms. Later a stage and two additional rooms were added. In 1938, the cornerstone of a new $85,000 building, paid for by Work Progress Administration funds, was laid for the new Auburn High School building. The school was first occupied in the fall of 1939.

Until the early 1970s, Auburn served all grade levels for students in the Riner community. Students from the Bethel community attended Bethel Elementary School and moved to Auburn in sixth grade. In 1972, the original Riner Elementary School was built adjacent to the high school and served kindergarten through fifth graders. In 1998 the Auburn Elementary School opened, serving all of the Bethel and Auburn communities. The middle school students moved to the old Riner Elementary building when it was vacated. The current Auburn High School building was completed in September, 2013. The Riner Elementary School, opened 41 years earlier, was razed and the lot is now used for sports activities. The 1938 high school building was converted to a middle school.

== Extracurricular activities ==
VHSL State Team Championships
Year	Class	Event
2026	1	Boys Field
2026	1	Boys Indoor Track
2026	1	Girls Indoor Track
2025	1	Boys Golf
2025	1	Boys Baseball
2025	1	Girls Outdoor Track
2025	1	Girls Indoor Track
2024	1	Girls Volleyball
2024	1	Girls Cross Country
2024	1	Boys Golf
2024	1	Girls Soccer
2023	1	Girls Softball (Note: 2023 was fourth straight title since 2020 season not held due to COVID-19)
2023	1	Girls Outdoor Track
2023	1	Girls Volleyball
2022	1	Boys Basketball
2022	1	Girls Softball
2022	1	Girls Tennis (Note: 2022 was fourth straight title since 2020 season not held due to COVID-19)
2022	1	Girls Outdoor Track
2022	1	Girls Volleyball
2021	1	Boys Baseball
2021	1	Girls Softball
2021	1	Girls Tennis
2021	1	Boys Outdoor Track
2021	1	Girls Volleyball
2020	1	Boys Basketball (Note: Co-champion since season ended before finals could be played due to COVID-19)
2020	1	Girls Volleyball
2019	1	Boys Baseball
2019	1	Girls Soccer
2019	1	Girls Softball
2019	1	Girls Tennis
2019	1	Girls Volleyball
2018	1	Boys Cross Country
2018	1	Girls Cross Country
2018	1	Girls Tennis
2018	1	Boys Outdoor Track
2018	1	Girls Outdoor Track
2017	1A	Boys Baseball
2017	1	Boys Cross Country
2017	1	Girls Cross Country
2017	1	Boys Golf
2016	1A	Girls Tennis
2017	1A	Boys Indoor Track
2017	1	Girls Outdoor Track
2016	1A	Boys Cross Country
2015	1A	Girls Tennis
2016	1A	Boys Outdoor Track
2016	1	Girls Outdoor Track
2015	1A	Boys Cross Country
2015	1A	Boys Outdoor Track
2014	1A	Boys Outdoor Track
2014	1A	Girls Volleyball
2013	1A	Girls Volleyball
2012	1A	Girls Volleyball
2005	1A	Debate
1974	A	Boys Tennis
1973	A	Boys Tennis
1967	III	Boys Basketball
