= Parry McCluer High School =

Location
- 100 Bradford Drive; Buena Vista, Virginia 24416; United States; 37°43′06″N 79°21′35″W

Information
- Funding type: Public
- Founded: 1920
- School district: Buena Vista City Public Schools
- Principal: Todd Jones
- Enrollment: 336 (2017–18)
- Colors: Blue and white
- Athletics conference: VHSL Class 1 VHSL Region C VHSL Pioneer District
- Mascot: Yosemite Sam
- Nickname: The Fighting Blues
- Rival: Rockbridge County High School; James River High School; Narrows High School
- Website: https://pmhs.bvcps.net/

Parry McCluer High School (PMHS) is a high school located in Buena Vista, Virginia, United States. The school has an enrollment of approximately 336 students. Its current principal is Todd Jones.

== Athletics ==
The Parry McCluer High School football team has won the state championship five times: in 1977, 1979, 1983, 1986, and 1987. The team was state runner-up in 1991.

The golf team won the 1980 state championship.

The boys' cross country team won the 1980, 2019, 2020, 2023, 2024, and 2025 single A state championship, and took runner-up in the 2011–12 state championship, losing to George Mason High School.

The boy's Outdoor track team got 2nd place in 2024, losing to Lancaster high school at the VHSL Class 1 state championships. At the time, this was the school's highest finish at the outdoor track state meet.

The boy's Indoor track team won the State title in 1980, 2020, and 2021

PM students got second in the 4x800 meter relay race at the Virginia 2024 Class 1A/2A Indoor State Track Meet with a time of 8:16.80, breaking the previous state record and school record for that event. A few months later in early summer, those same 4 boys won the Class 1 VHSL 2024 state Outdoor track 4 × 800 m relay with a time of 8:16.38, breaking the school record, as well as the state meet record.

The PM Softball team won Back to Back State Championships in 2015 and 2016. Their head coach is Troy Clark. The PM softball team had 3 participants in VHSCA All Star game in 2016. PM softball also had 3 participants in the 2017 VHSCA All Star game.

The girls' basketball team won their first state title in 2017 under Coach Adam Gilbert, and went on to repeat as champions the following season (2018), while winning the regional tournament as well. The Lady Blues won the state title again in 2019 completing the three-peat.

The boys basketball team has one state championship. They won the Class 1 title in 2021 over Altavista 56-39. They were led by superstar big man Spencer Hamilton who towered over his opponents at 7’ tall. Hamilton is a two time Class 1 player of the year.

Parry McCluer Middle School will be relocating to the High School starting with the 2026-27 school year, as additions and alterations will be made for the short and long term.

== Marching Blues ==
The Parry McCluer marching band was formed by the local chapter of the American Legion in 1941. It did not become an official school unit nor take on the name "marching" until 1947. The band was very successful, especially in the 1960-1990 period, during which it won first place in marching for at least one Festival of States competition, as well as many other notable achievements

The Marching Band was directed by Anna Jarrett from 2009 to 2016, Shannon Light from 2016 to 2020, and by Adam Miller from 2020 to 2022, Joshua Holsinger from 2022 to 2023, and Gabriel Wise from 2023 to 2025. The current Band Director is Gabrielle Taylor.

== Notable alumni ==
- Charlie Manuel – manager of the Philadelphia Phillies, 2005–2013
- Tony Deyo – standup comedian

== Popular culture ==
Parry McCluer High School features prominently in Orson Scott Card's novel, The Lost Gate and its sequels.
