= Eastern Montgomery High School =

Public high school in Virginia, US

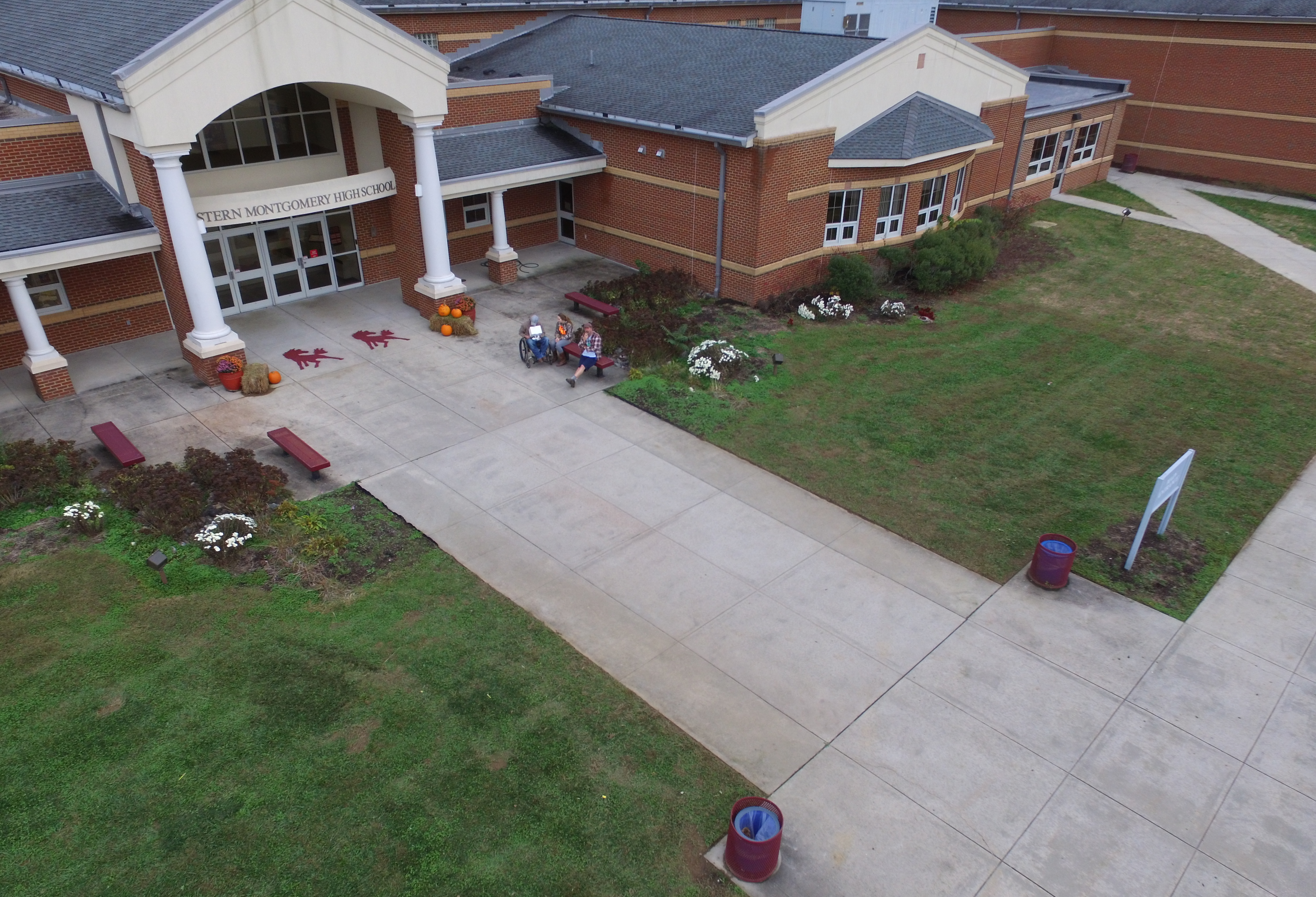

Location
- 4695 Crozier Road; Elliston, Virginia 24087; United States
- Coordinates: 37°12′24.6″N 80°14′5.5″W

Information
- School type: Public, high school
- School district: Montgomery County Public Schools
- Superintendent: Annie Whitaker (acting)
- Principal: Danny Knott
- Grades: 9-12
- Enrollment: 295 (2016-17)
- Language: English
- Colors: Maroon, Black and White
- Athletics conference: VHSL Class 1 VHSL Region C VHSL Pioneer District
- Mascot: Mustang
- Website: Official Site

Eastern Montgomery High School, built during 1999 and 2000, is located in Elliston, Virginia and is one of four high schools in Montgomery County, Virginia. The school's mascot is the Mustang, and the school colors are maroon, black and white.

== History ==
The school is considered a moving of Shawsville High School, which was originally a joined school with Shawsville Middle School. In the late nineties, a growth in the area's population caused demand for a new and larger school to house all the students. Eastern Montgomery was built soon after, with all the remaining Shawsville High students being moved to it at the start of the next year. Shawsville Middle remained in the old building, with the second building being shut down and used for storage. The schools greatest athletic success came during the 2010 season. The 2010 football team was able to reach the Division 1 State Championship Game, but were defeated by Riverhead Highschool in Staunton Virginia by a score of 49–63.

== Academics ==
Eastern Montgomery has received awards for its academics, being accredited annually for both the Standards of Learning and No Child Left Behind requirements. The school has many elective choices beyond the core classes, being particularly strong in the career and technical education and fine arts departments. Spanish is offered along with art, chorus, and band.

== Extracurricular activities ==
Eastern Montgomery has teams in baseball, basketball, cross country, cheerleading, football, golf, softball, tennis, track, soccer, and volleyball. Eastern Montgomery also competes in many academic events, including MACC, Scholastic Bowl, and Forensics. Eastern Montgomery has many awards in academic activities including a 2004 state championship in Scholastic Bowl. In 2018 Eastern Montgomery was runner-up in the Region 1C Scholastic Bowl Tournament. The Scholastic Bowl team also won the Pioneer District Tournament in 2018.
