= William Fleming High School =

Coordinates: 37.310389°N 79.985493°W

Location
- 3649 Ferncliff Avenue; Roanoke, Virginia 24017; United States

Information
- Type: Public
- Established: 1933
- School district: Roanoke City Public Schools
- NCES District ID: 5103300
- School code: 510330001438
- NCES School ID: VA-124-124040
- Principal: Tracie Anderson
- Staff: 100.63 (on an FTE basis)
- Enrollment: 1,909 (2024–25)
  - Grade 9: 565
  - Grade 10: 561
  - Grade 11: 414
  - Grade 12: 369
- Student to teacher ratio: 16.49
- Colors: Royal blue and gold
- Athletics conference: Division 4A Conference 24 North, Division 4A Blue Ridge District, Virginia High School League
- Mascot: Colonel
- Rivals: Patrick Henry High School; Northside High School
- USNWR ranking: 12,295
- Publication: (literary magazine)
- Newspaper: Yes
- Yearbook: The Beehive (1933 - 1936) The Colonel (1937 - present)
- Website: Official website

William Fleming High School is one of the only two public high schools in the Roanoke City area school division, the other being Patrick Henry High School. The school itself is located at 3649 Ferncliff Avenue, Roanoke, Virginia, in the Miller/Arrowood neighborhood. William Fleming is part of the Roanoke City Public School System, regulated by the Roanoke City School Board.

== History ==
=== Namesake ===
The name William Fleming derived from a Scottish immigrant who was a prominent physician and statesman in Virginia. Originally a native of West Virginia, Fleming migrated into Virginian borders and settled in Norfolk in 1755. After he relocated into Norfolk, he hurriedly began to involve himself in the war effort as an active physician, serving alongside the regiment of colonel and future president George Washington against the French and the Indians. Then he was promoted to the rank of colonel and upheld his position while fighting in Lord Dunmore's War until he was injured, ultimately ending his service in the military. His significance in relation to the school came about after his militant service. He continued to help nurse the ailing and was an active participant in the matters concerning both Roanoke City and Virginia. Then he served in the General Assembly as the senator of Virginia and also as the governor for an abrupt period. Along with the school, a national historical marker on the Monterey Golf Course, which denotes the former location where Colonel Fleming's plantation stood, was dedicated to his contribution.

=== School ===
In September 1933, 152 students began the school year in a newly constructed building on a 7.5-acre (30,000 m2) tract which is the present site of Breckinridge Middle School in Roanoke. The original William Fleming High School consisted of five high school classrooms, one elementary classroom, a library, a reception room, a chemistry laboratory, two locker rooms, an auditorium, and an office. In 1949, William Fleming became part of the Roanoke City School System through the annexation of part of Roanoke County by the city. William Fleming was moved to its present location in 1961 near Hershberger Road NW. In 1989, eight auxiliary classrooms were added to accommodate the arrival of ninth graders on campus as middle schools were established in the city. A new $57 million building opened in 2009 next to the existing facilities, and the construction of the school's first on-campus football stadium was completed in 2010.

== Demographics ==
As of the 2023–2024 school year, William Fleming High School had a total enrollment of 1,909 students. The student body is diverse, with a plurality of students identifying as Black or African American (46%), followed by a significant Hispanic and Latino population (31.5%).

The school participates in the Community Eligibility Provision (CEP), which allows all students to receive free meals regardless of individual household income. Approximately 95% of the student body is eligible for free or reduced-price lunch.

Enrollment by Race/Ethnicity (2023–2024)
Racial / Ethnic Group	Students	Percentage
Black or African American	879	46.0%
Hispanic / Latino	601	31.5%
White	260	13.6%
Asian	94	4.9%
Two or More Races	71	3.7%
American Indian / Alaska Native	3	0.2%
Native Hawaiian / Pacific Islander	1	<0.1%

== Academics ==
William Fleming High School serves students in grades 9 through 12. The school offers the following curriculum and courses:

- Air Force ROTC
- Business
- Electives
- ELL
- English
- Fine Arts
- Fine/Practical arts
- Foreign Language
- Health/ PE
- Mathematic
- Plato Lab
- ROTEC
- Science
- Social Studies
- Special Education
- Photography

In 2009, the credibility of William Fleming's faculty and institution at large were challenged when some of the assistant principals, under the direction of head principal Susan Willis, manipulated 30 schedules of special education students to prevent them from taking the SOLs. The state-mandated exams test student's abilities in mathematics, English, and science to ensure that the curriculum of the school aligns with what the state believes the students should be learning. Thus, by preventing certain students from taking the tests, it increased the overall scores of the school. This infringement made the local and state news, making a spectacle of William Fleming. As a result, Willis was given paid leave and the assistant principals who worked in conjunction with her were fired. Since the dilemma Fleming has struggled to maintain its accreditation with regard to its SOLs, and was at risk of losing it during the school year 2010-2011 after being audited by the state of Virginia.

== Athletics ==
William Fleming High School is a member of the Virginia High School League and competes in the 4A competition within conference 24 and the Blue Ridge District. Fleming formerly competed in the now defunct Group AAA Roanoke Valley District and the AA Blue Ridge District. William Fleming won the Group AA state title in men's basketball in 2007, and also captured two titles in the 1950s. In 1985, Fleming won the Group AAA state championship in men's outdoor track. The Colonels have two state runner-up finishes in men's AAA basketball and in AAA and AA football over the past 15 years.

William Fleming offers the following sports:

Fall	Winter	Spring
Cross Country	Cheerleading	Soccer
Golf	Basketball	Baseball
Cheerleading	Indoor Track	Softball
Football	Swimming	Outdoor Track
Volleyball	Wrestling	Lacrosse

It also offers the following extracurricular activities: Beta Club, DECA, free dance, FBLA-PBL, Forensics, French Honor Society, HOSA, Key Club, SGA, SkillsUSA, Thespian Club

== Community engagement ==
During spring break 2009, 7 students from William Fleming accompanied by students from James Madison University and representatives from Aid for America took a community service trip to Welch, West Virginia. The area is one of the poorest in the United States. The students helped to renovate a dilapidated house so that a man, who lost all of his fingers in a mining incident, could gain custody of his child.

Communally, the school has also helped in the retention of dropout students by hosting the Western Virginia Education Classic, a football game between two historically black colleges and universities. The proceeds from the game go toward the local TAP's Project Recovery Program that serves as a partnership with Roanoke City Schools to target and help students at risk of dropping out of school. After the demolition of Victory Stadium, Roanoke's premier football stadium, the classic was no longer being held. However, with Fleming's stadium the classic can proceed and the revenue can continue to help at-risk students.

== Notable alumni ==
- Calvin Bannister (Class of 2002) — NFL defensive back
- Darrius Bratton (Class of 2016) — CFL defensive back for the Edmonton Elks
- Beth A. Brown (Class of 1987) — NASA astrophysicist
- Troy Daniels (Class of 2009) — NBA player for the Los Angeles Lakers
- Jermaine Hardy (Class of 2000) — NFL defensive back
- Jamelle Hagins – professional basketball player in NBA G League.
- Nidal Hasan (Class of 1988) — perpetrator of the 2009 Fort Hood shooting
- Ashlee Holland (Class of 1997) — winner of I Wanna Be a Soap Star
- Pete Johnson (Class of 1954) — NFL running back
- Steve Robinson (Class of 1978) — collegiate men's basketball coach
- Sherman Lea – American public servant and community leader
- John St. Clair (Class of 1995) — NFL offensive tackle
- Ralph K. Smith (Class of 1960) — businessman and former Roanoke mayor
- Lee Suggs (Class of 1998) — NFL running back
- Lawrence Hamlar — African American businessman

== Faculty ==
- Bobby Watson (basketball coach) – (1964 - 1965) American basketball coach
- Lynne Agee – (1971 - 1978) American basketball coach and educator.
