= Academic Competition for Excellence =

Academic Competition for Excellence (often shortened to ACE) is a format of high school quizbowl played in the mid-Atlantic, especially in the Commonwealth of Virginia. There are several leagues in West Virginia, Virginia, and North Carolina, although many of the Virginia leagues have become feeders for Virginia High School League Scholastic Bowl competition, or play the VHSL format instead of the ACE format. (The Scholastic Bowl format allows districts to keep playing their old formats during the regular season.) ACE teams also exist throughout Arkansas, though the game follows a slightly different format.

Most quizbowl formats feature teams of three to five players from each school, competing on questions that span the realm on human knowledge. There are rarely pre-assigned reading lists, or limitations on subject matter. Informal limits, based on what students might reasonably be taught, or have learned in outside reading, do exist, and some competitions will restrict the amount of popular culture in each match.

The ACE format requires each school to field five teams of four players each. The five teams compete in four subject areas -- Mathematics, Science, Social Studies, and English -- and a fifth team plays in an All-Around competition. No student can play on two subject-area teams, although he/she can play on a subject-area team and the All-Around team. The wide variety of students (a school needs at least 16 players to compete) that can play in the ACE format makes it popular with administrators. An ACE competition usually has two schools, and consists of the five teams from each school competing one at a time.

The subject-area competitions usually have questions from subject areas that are determined before the season begins. For Math, Science, and Social Studies this is usually fairly open-ended:

- Math questions are usually written in the areas of algebra, geometry, trigonometry, and sometimes calculus.
- Science questions are usually written in the areas of biology, chemistry, physics, earth science, and sometimes computer science.
- Social Studies questions are usually written in the areas of US history, World history, Geography, and civics.

English questions are usually written from a pre-assigned reading list. The list usually consists of a number of novels, short stories, plays, and poems, and questions are about details from those works.

All-Around questions are from the four subject areas (again, using the reading list for English questions.) Usually, fine arts, philosophy, religion, and current events questions are included in the All-Around competition, but popular culture and sports are specifically excluded. (This appeals to some administrators.)

== History of ACE ==
ACE leagues began appearing in Virginia during the early and mid-1980s. The format proved popular and was widely copied by administrators across Virginia. Some leagues mirrored VHSL districts, but some leagues were more geographic in scope. During the late 1990s, some of the Virginia leagues switched to the VHSL format, and others changed their competition dates to the fall and began sending their champions to VHSL regional competition. Most of Western Virginia still refers to their Scholastic Bowl team as their "ACE team."

== ACE leagues ==
- Eastern Panhandle, WV
- James River ACE—area south of Charlottesville and west of Richmond, corresponds with the VHSL James River District
- Jefferson ACE—Charlottesville area, VA (disbanded, replaced by VHSL Jefferson District competition)
- Mountain Academic Competition Conference -- Roanoke-Galax area, VA
- Rockingham County (NC) Academic Competition Challenge -- Reidsville, NC area
- Scholastic Competition for Academic Excellence League -- Martinsville area, VA, and formerly Lynchburg area, VA
- Southwest Academic Conference -- Bristol-Wytheville-Marion area, VA
- Valley ACE—Harrisonburg area, VA (disbanded, and members joined the VHSL competition for their districts.)
