= Covington High School (Covington, Virginia) =

Former high school in Virginia, US

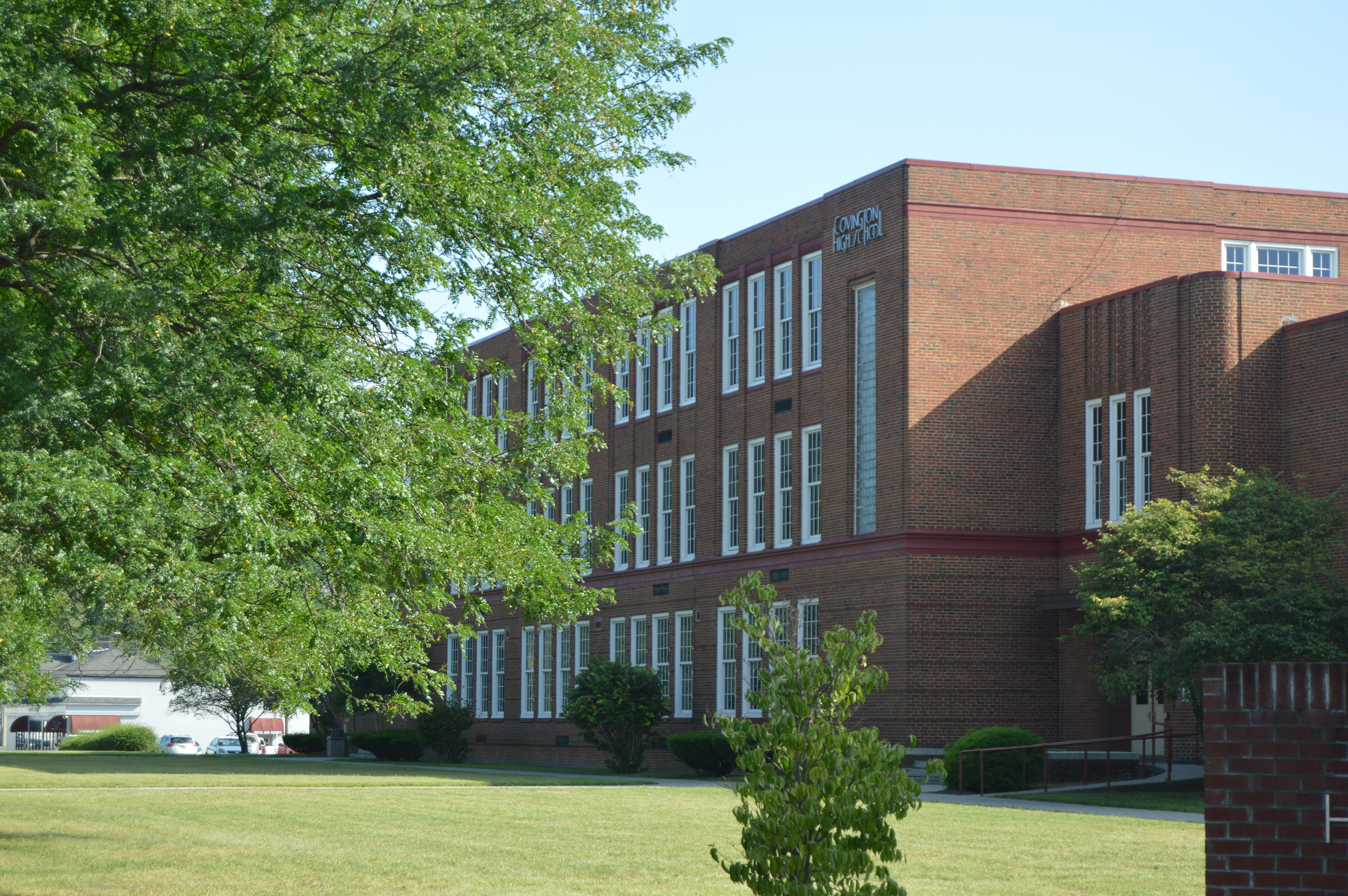
- Front of Covington High School in 2016

Location
- 530 South Lexington Avenue; Covington, Virginia 24426; United States; 37°47′4.5″N 79°59′29.4″W

Information
- School type: Public, high school
- Closed: 2023
- School district: Covington City Public Schools
- Superintendent: Melinda Snead-Johnson
- Principal: Derek Cantrell
- Grades: 8-12
- Enrollment: 373 (2016-17)
- Language: English
- Colors: Navy Blue and Vegas Gold
- Athletics conference: Pioneer District; Region C
- Nickname: Cougars
- Rival: Alleghany; Bath County; James River
- Website: Official Site
- Covington High School
- U.S. National Register of Historic Places
- Virginia Landmarks Register
- NRHP reference No.: 08000417
- VLR No.: 107-5180

Significant dates
- Added to NRHP: May 15, 2008
- Designated VLR: March 20, 2008

Covington High School was a public secondary school in Covington, Virginia, United States. It was part of Covington City Public Schools and was located on 530 South Lexington Avenue. On July 1, 2023, the school was merged with neighboring Alleghany High School.

== School information ==
Covington High School was the sole high school for Covington City in the Alleghany Highlands, and was one of the smallest high schools in Virginia at the time of the 2023 merger. Unlike most larger school districts whose high schools enroll 9th-12th graders, Covington held students from the 8th grade through 12th grade. The building has been repurposed as a new Covington Middle School that will serve all students of Alleghany County and Covington City.

== Demographics ==
Covington High School in 2014-2015 was 79% White; 20% Black, and 5% Asian, 5% Hispanic.

== Enrollment history ==
| School Year | Number of Students |
| 1995–1996 | 376 (294 in 9–12) |
| 1996–1997 | 363 (305 in 9–12) |
| 1997–1998 | 356 (282 in 9–12) |
| 1998–1999 | 355 (273 in 9–12) |
| 1999–2000 | 337 (269 in 9–12) |
| 2000–2001 | 362 (276 in 9–12) |
| 2001–2002 | 362 (295 in 9–12) |
| 2002–2003 | 359 (272 in 9–12) |
| 2003–2004 | 375 (292 in 9–12) |
| 2004–2005 | 352 (284 in 9–12) |
| 2005–2006 | 350 (277 in 9–12) |

== Test scores ==
Covington High School was a fully accredited high school based on the Standards of Learning tests in Virginia at the time of the merger.

== Athletics ==
The mascot was a Cougar and the sports teams played in the A Pioneer District and Region C. The Cougars won two state titles in football, the 1942 Class B state championship and the 1984 Virginia High School League Group A state championship.

Before 1984, Covington was an AA school participating in the AA Blue Ridge District.

== Notable alumni ==
- Bill Hepler (1945–2025), professional baseball player
- Jim Lemon (1928–2006), professional baseball player
- Linton Townes (born 1959), basketball player
