= Montgomery County Public Schools (Virginia) =

School district in Virginia, United States

Location
- Montgomery County, Virginia United States

District information
- Type: School district

Other information
- Website: www.mcps.org

Montgomery County Public Schools (MCPS) is the school district serving Montgomery County, Virginia.

== Schools ==
=== Primary (Grades K-2) ===
- Christiansburg Primary School

=== Elementary (Grades K-5) ===
- Auburn Elementary School
- Belview Elementary School
- Christiansburg Elementary School (grades 3-5)
- Eastern Montgomery Elementary School
- Falling Branch Elementary School
- Gilbert Linkous Elementary School
- Harding Avenue Elementary School
- Kipps Elementary School
- Margaret Beeks Elementary School
- Price's Fork Elementary School

=== Middle (Grades 6-8) ===
- Auburn Middle School
- Blacksburg Middle School
- Christiansburg Middle School
- Shawsville Middle School

=== High Schools (Grades 9-12) ===
- Auburn High School
- Blacksburg High School
- Christiansburg High School
- Eastern Montgomery High School
