= Blacksburg High School =

Location
- 3401 Bruin Lane; Blacksburg, Virginia 24060; United States; 37°12′39″N 80°27′36″W

Information
- School type: Public, high school
- Established: 1952
- School district: Montgomery County Public Schools
- Superintendent: Bernard F. Bragen, Jr.
- Principal: Chris Stewart
- Grades: 9–12
- Enrollment: 1,325 (2024–25)
- Language: English
- Colors: Blue and gold
- Athletics conference: Virginia High School League; Group 4A Region D River Ridge District
- Team name: Bruins
- Website: Blacksburg High School

Blacksburg High School is a high school in the Montgomery County public school division. The school serves the town of Blacksburg, Virginia, and surrounding areas of the county.

== History ==
The first Blacksburg High School was located in the former Blacksburg Female Academy building downtown on the block between Draper Road (formerly Water Street) on the east and Otey Street on the west; and between Roanoke and Jackson Streets (on the south and north respectively). The Female academy was created in the 1840s by an act of the Virginia General Assembly. By 1908, the Female Academy had closed and the town had established public school at that location. A yearbook and other published data bearing the name Blacksburg High School exists from the time when the school occupied the Female Academy building. In 1916, a dedicated high school building was constructed in the same block adjacent to Otey Street. Photographs in the Virginia Tech collection from the 1920s and 1940s show this building and the structure itself bears a cornerstone dated 1916. Today the building is owned and used by Virginia Tech.

In the 1930s a dedicated Elementary School building was constructed on the corner of Roanoke Street and Draper Road (immediately next to the old Female Academy building). In the early 1950s, the Female Academy building was finally demolished.

The third Blacksburg High School was constructed in 1952 and was located on South Main Street in Blacksburg, VA, The fourth Blacksburg High School was built in 1974. After moving out, the old building housed Blacksburg Middle School, but Blacksburg High School still returned to use the football stadium behind their original building until a new stadium was constructed in October 2008 behind the new Blacksburg Middle School. The 1952 Blacksburg High School building was demolished in the Summer of 2011, 7 years after the middle school moved out.

In 2002 the mascot of Blacksburg High School was changed from the Indian to the Bruin after extensive debate and controversy. The corresponding middle school mascot, the Brave, was changed to the Titan.

On February 13, 2010, following a snowstorm that dropped two feet of snow on the area, the gymnasium roof of the 1974 Blacksburg High School suffered a catastrophic structural failure and collapsed, causing structural damage to other areas of the school. The school building was condemned and students attended night school on a split schedule with the Blacksburg Middle School students at their school for the remainder of the year. It was determined that repair costs would exceed $18 million and would not be feasible given the age of the school; it was decided not to repair the building. For the next two years, until the school year of 2013–14, Blacksburg High School operated on a normal schedule in the Blacksburg Middle School building at 3109 Prices Fork Road, and the middle schoolers went to school in the old Christiansburg Middle School.

The new school building is located at 3401 Bruin Lane, behind the current Blacksburg Middle School and Bill Brown Football Stadium. It opened in the 2013 fall semester.

== Academic recognition ==
The Newsweek list of "America's Top Public High Schools" lists Blacksburg High School at 617 for 2012, which was down from 2011 where the school ranked 384. Blacksburg High School was ranked at 422 for 2009 while the highest ranking for 2008 was 227. Blacksburg High School was ranked 164 in 2003. This status is based partially upon how many Blacksburg High School students elect to take the Advanced Placement Exams.

== Athletics and extracurriculars ==
Blacksburg High School is a member of the Virginia High School League and competes in the AAA River Ridge District, a district in Region IV of Group AA. Blacksburg formerly competed in the AA Blue Ridge District, which it had joined when the AA New River Valley District dissolved. Blacksburg has captured the Wachovia Cup, later the VHSL Cup, the VHSL's award for overall excellence in athletics a record 15 times, in 1989–90, 1990–91 (tied), 1992–93, 2002–03, 2006–07, 2008–09, 2009–10, 2011–12, 2012–13, 2013–14, 2015–16, 2016–17, 2017–18, 2018–19, and 2020–21.

=== Soccer ===
Blacksburg has won state championships in boys' soccer in 1989, 1993, 1995, 1998, 1999, 2000, 2002, 2005, 2007, 2009, 2010, 2013, 2018, and 2026, more than any other high school in Virginia.

Blacksburg holds the record for the longest unbeaten streak, with 87 wins from 1998 to 2001. During this streak they had 64 consecutive wins, the second most in league history.

The Blacksburg Girls Soccer program has a state record of 78 straight games unbeaten from 2014 to 2017, including state championships in 2014, 2015, and 2016.

=== Tennis ===
Blacksburg were boys' state champions in 2015 and 2021,

=== Football ===
Blacksburg High School won state championships in 1977, 1989, and 2016.

=== Basketball ===
Blacksburg High School won state championships in boys' basketball in class IB for 1965 and 1968. The girls won state championships for girls' basketball in 1978, 1982, 1992, 1993, and 2002.

=== Swimming and diving ===
Blacksburg High School won state championships in boys' swimming and diving in class 4A in 2019, 2020, 2021, 2024, and 2025. The girls won the state championship in 2021.

=== Cross country ===
The cross country program has won 25 state championships and 11 runner-up state finishes. The Bruin boys won state championships for cross country in 1984, 1985, 1986, 1988, 1998, 2009, 2010, 2011, 2012, 2016, 2022, 2023, and 2024. The girls won state championships in cross country in 1982, 1983, 1984, 1985, 1986, 1989, 1990, 1992, 2006, 2007, 2008, 2011, 2012, 2013, 2014, 2015, 2016, 2017, and 2022.

In 2009, 2013, 2014 the Blacksburg girls xc team was invited to the Nike Cross Nationals in Portland, OR. The girls were 6th nationally in 2009, 31st in 2013, 7th in 2014. The girls also won the Nike Southeast Championships in North Carolina in 2012 the Blacksburg Boys finished 10th at nationals. The Roanoke Times has awarded Blacksburg athletes with the Cross Country Athlete of the Year several times.

=== Track ===
==== Indoor ====
Blacksburg holds state championships in boys' indoor track in 1972 (tied with Radford High School), 2013, and 2017 State championships in girls' indoor track were won in 2006, 2008, 2009, 2010, 2011, 2012, 2014, 2015m and 2019.

==== Outdoor ====
State championships for boys' outdoor track were won in 1949, 1981, and 1982. State championships for girls' outdoor track were won in 1982, 1983, 1984, 1985, 1990, 1991, 1993, 2009, 2010, 2014, 2017, and 2019. Blacksburg is ranked #1 for most championships in girls' outdoor track & field for Virginia with twelve. (Note: Reference actually states that the school has won eleven titles, but the count is missing the 2014 title from the previous page.)

=== Golf ===
Blacksburg has won state championships in boys' golf in 1968, 2006, 2007, 2008, 2016, 2017, 2021, 2022, 2023, 2024, and 2025.

=== Forensics and debate ===
From 1988 to 2003 the school won 15 consecutive Group AA state titles in forensics. The Debate team has won 16 state titles, including championships in 1981, 1982, 1983, 1985, 1989, 1990, 1991, 1993, 1996, 1999, 2006, 2007, 2009, 2010, 2016, and 2021. In 1999 the combined speech and debate teams were named one of the top five teams in the country at the National Catholic League Tournament in Chicago.

=== VHSL Scholastic Bowl ===
Blacksburg won the state championship in the scholastic bowl in 1999, 2010, 2024, 2025, and again in 2026. They tied for 65th in the NAQT National Competition in 2024 and 2026, their highest ever finish. In 2026 Blacksburg won the televised Battle of the Brains championship in Richmond, VA.

== Notable alumni ==
- Shane Beamer — Head football coach, University of South Carolina Gamecocks
- Lanto Griffin — Professional golfer on the PGA Tour
- Hank Hardwick — college football player for Navy Midshipmen and Virginia Tech, college football coach for Navy Midshipmen
- Josh Kaufman — Season 6 winner of NBC's vocal competition show The Voice
