= Brentsville District High School =

Coordinates: 38°41′30.51″N 77°34′5.35″W

Location
- 12109 Aden Road; Nokesville, Virginia 20181; United States

Information
- Type: Public
- Motto: Esse quam videri (To be rather than to seem to be)
- Founded: 1929
- School district: Prince William County Public Schools
- School number: (703) 594-2161
- Principal: Amanda Burke
- Grades: 9-12
- Enrollment: 838 (2024-25)
- Colors: Orange; Black
- Mascot: Tiger
- Website: brentsvillehs.pwcs.edu

Brentsville District High School, commonly known as Brentsville, is a public high school in Nokesville in unincorporated Prince William County, Virginia, United States, and part of Prince William County Public Schools. It is the only high school in Prince William County considered to be in a developing rural community.

== History ==
Brentsville District High officially opened on September 5, 1929, and hosted grades one through eleven. From 1929 to 1964, Brentsville existed in the building that currently exists as Nokesville Elementary School. In 1965, the school moved to its new building located on Aden road, and over the years additions were made to the building's structure, with the most recent being a new gymnasium building, with the old space becoming the school's current library.

In 2002, the campus ceased to function in its tandem role as middle and high school, instead becoming exclusively a high school facility. Before this point, the school was district more for students living in the Nokesville, Virginia area. Now the school is district for the Nokesville and Bristow, Virginia areas. Despite this growth, Brentsville is the smallest high school in Prince William County. Remodeling plans for 2006 included the refitting of the auditorium, adding more comfortable seats, bowing the stage, and replacing a sound panel wall.

== Demographics ==
In the 2024-2025 school year, Brentsville's student body was:

- 25.1% Hispanic
- 61.7% White
- 5.1% Black/African American
- 4.2% two or more races
- 3.5% Asian
- 0.4% American Indian/Alaskan

== Academics and programs ==
Brenstville District High School offers its students the opportunity to enroll in The Cambridge Programme and to take Cambridge University's international examinations both toward individual subject certificates as well as work towards and AICE certificate.

The school was a 2004 recipient of the Blue Ribbon Academic School award. Brentsville District High School remains the only Virginia high school to ever achieve this status. As of the 2023-2024 school year, 82% of the students continue onto high education.

The school grades its students using the Prince William County grading system and grades using academic quarters.

Grade	Numeric equivalent	GPA Conversion
A	90 - 100	4.0
B+	87 - 89	3.4
B	80 - 86	3.0
C+	77 - 79	2.4
C	70 - 76	2.0
D+	67 - 69	1.4
D	60 - 66	1.0
F	0 - 59	0.0

== Principals and school leadership ==
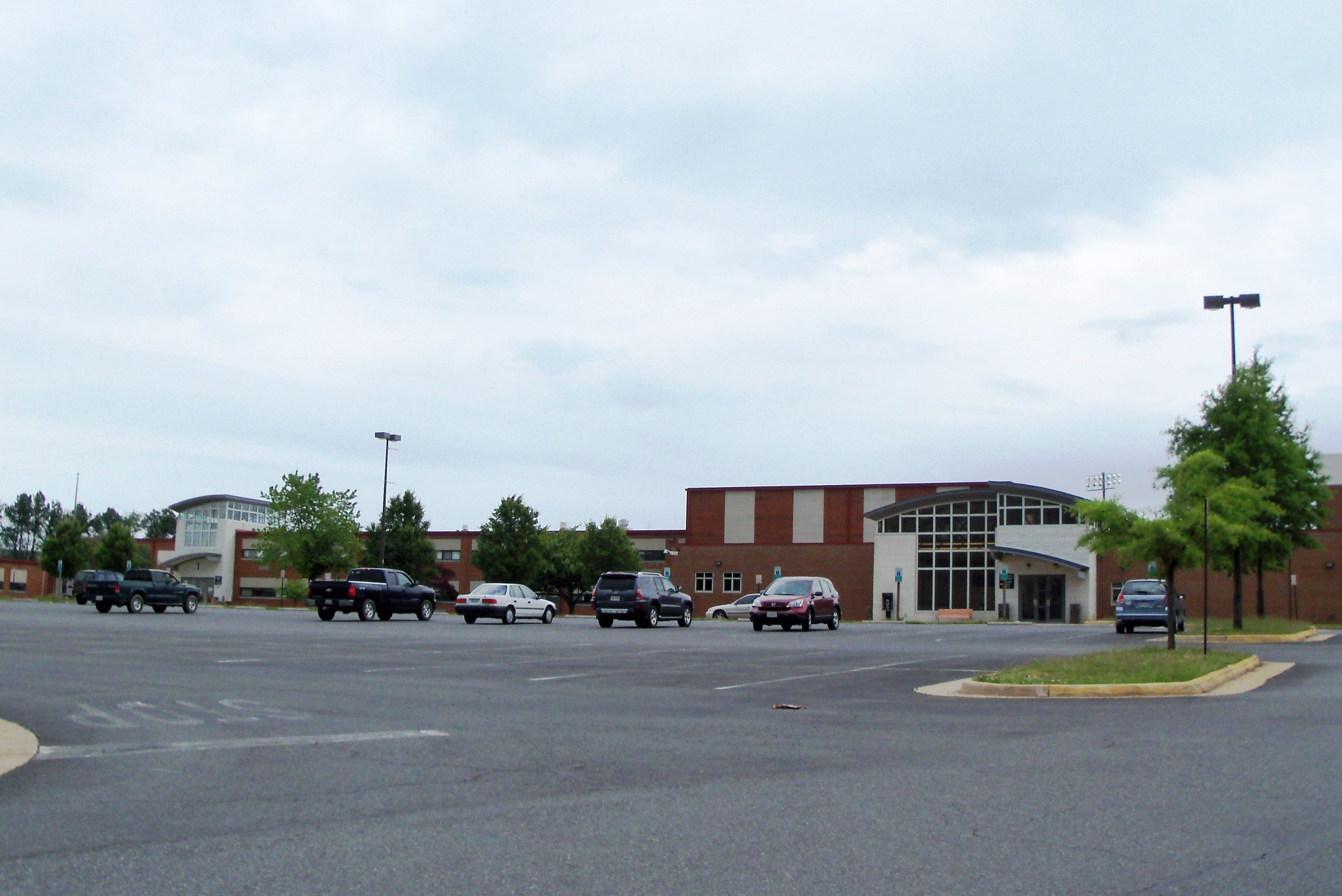
Brentsville District High School

Principal name	Years served	Current status
Amanda Burke	2026-Present	Current Principal (2026)
Katherine J. Meints	2011–2026	Retired (2026)
Robert M. Scott	2007–2011	Language Arts Teacher at Gainesville High School (2026)
Alex Carter	2005–2007	Vice President, Implementation at the Colorado Education Initiative (2026)
Michael Mulgrew	1999–2005	Retired, former Area IV associate superintendent (2026)
Norval E. Waugh	Unknown	Deceased, former associate superintendent of Stafford County Public Schools (2012)

== Extracurricular programs ==
As of 2014, there are 33 student groups considered official extracurricular programs at Brentsville District High School. These include academic, language, and religious groups. Groups such as the Future Farmers of America and the Future Business Leaders of America have been historically significant in reflecting the culture at the high school.

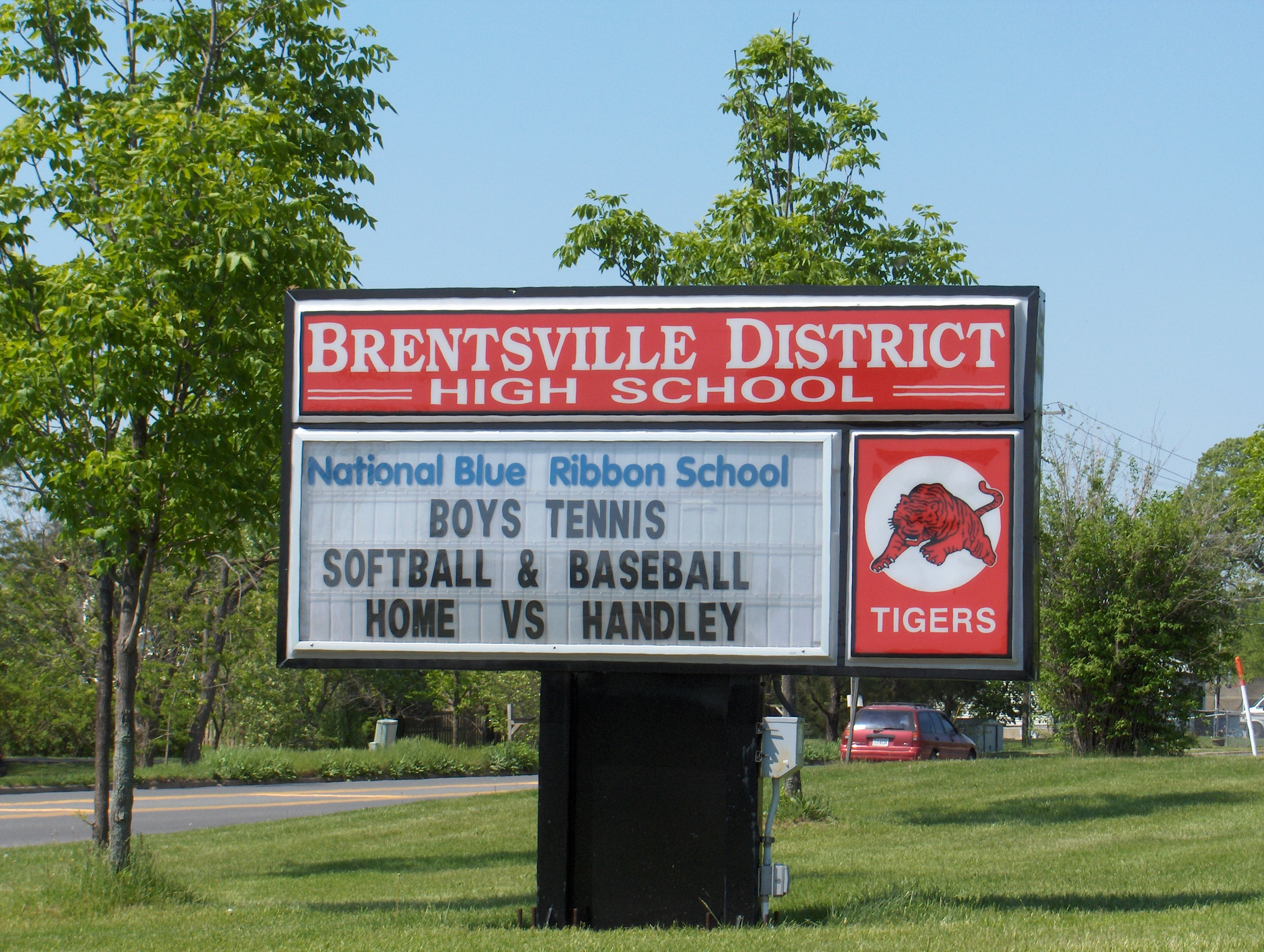
Brentsville District High School Sign

== Athletics ==
The athletic teams of Brentsville District High School (during the regular season) compete in the AA Evergreen District and Region II for which the governing body is the Virginia High School League. Brentsville is, as of 2015, one of the smallest schools to compete in Group 3A athletics. For post-season purposes, Brentsville is assigned to Conference 28 as it is a Group 3A school in the eastern region. Before the 2004 academic year, Brentsville competed in the A Bull Run District. Brentsville's official mascot for all sporting events is the tiger, the school colors are black and orange. The high school athletic program has historically performed well in its wrestling and cross country programs and surprised with outstanding seasons in multiple sports over the years, several times resulting in unexpected state championships. While the football team has never been awarded a state championship, they have made it to the state tournament in recent years. The Tigers won back to back girls' soccer State Championships in 2023 and 2024.

The high school has received academic awards including being ranked as the Sports Illustrated Magazine top athletic school in Virginia in 2005 for the 1995-2005 period. The school also received the Wachovia Cup, now known as the Wells Fargo Cup, in 2001, 2002, and 2003.

Brentsville District High School competitive teams and state championships:

Varsity athletic team	Gender participation	State championships	Championship years
Baseball	Men's	1	1995
Basketball	Men's	0	
Basketball	Women's	0	
Wrestling	Men's	9	1974; 1976; 1993; 1994; 1996; 1999; 2001; 2002; 2003
Lacrosse	Men's	0	
Soccer	Men's	1	1996
Soccer	Women's	3	2003; 2023; 2024
Cheerleading	Women's	4	2007; 2013; 2019; 2022
Cross country	Men's	7	1998; 2002; 2004; 2005; 2006; 2007; 2014
Cross country	Women's	8	1995; 1996; 1997; 1998; 1999; 2000; 2001; 2005
Dance	Women's	0	
Drill	Women's	0	
Football	Men's	0	
Lacrosse	Women's	0	
Golf	Men's	1	1989
Tennis	Men's	3	1971; 1972; 1975
Tennis	Women's	0	
Softball	Women's	1	1998
Indoor track and field	Men's	0	
Indoor track and field	Women's	0	
Outdoor track and field	Men's	0	
Outdoor track and field	Women's	1	2008
Swimming	Men's	2	2010; 2011
Swimming	Women's	0	
