= Riner, Virginia =

Riner
- Census-designated place
- Location within Shenandoah Valley Location within Virginia Location within the United States
- Coordinates: 37°3′46″N 80°26′22″W
- Country: United States
- State: Virginia
- County: Montgomery

Population (2020)
  - Total: 1,196
- Time zone: UTC−5 (Eastern (EST))
  - Summer (DST): UTC−4 (EDT)
- ZIP codes: 24149
- Area code: 540
- FIPS code: 51-67256
- GNIS feature ID: 2584908

Riner is a census-designated place in Montgomery County, Virginia, United States. The population as of the 2020 Census was 1,196.

Riner had its beginnings in 1808 when a sawmill was put into operation. The town was first called Old Forks, and then later Five Forks and Five Points. It was known primarily as Auburn from about 1850 until 1882.

The U.S. post office was the reason that the name of the village was changed from Auburn to Riner in 1882. Between the establishment of the original U.S. Post office in the community in the 1871-73 congressional session and 1882 there was no postmaster in the town, and the mail was distributed at the local store by the proprietor Major Lawrence. The citizens of the Auburn community petitioned the government for a postmaster and one was appointed in 1882. However, the result was the determination that another locale in Virginia already had the Auburn postmark. The post office was instead given the name of a prominent citizen of the village, Mr. David Riner, who later served in the Virginia House of Delegates.

The Howard-Bell-Feather House and Riner Historic District are listed on the National Register of Historic Places.

Auburn Elementary School, Auburn Middle School, and Auburn High School are all located in Riner. Camp Carysbrook is the oldest overnight camp for girls in Virginia since 1923.

== Demographics ==
Historical population
Census	Pop.	Note	%±
2020	949		—
U.S. Decennial Census; 2010 2020

Riner was first listed as a census designated place in the 2010 U.S. census.
