= Shenandoah Valley Governor's School =

Coordinates: 38°6′55.8″N 78°59′20″W

Location
- 49 Hornet Road; Fisherville, Virginia 22939; United States

Information
- Type: Magnet school
- Established: 1993
- School district: Augusta County Public Schools
- Director: Lee Ann Whitesell
- Grades: 11-12
- Enrollment: 175
- Colors: Teal, purple
- Website: Shenandoah Valley Governor's School

The Shenandoah Valley Governor's School is one of Virginia's 18 state-initiated magnet Governor's Schools. It is a part-time school where 11th and 12th grade students take advanced classes in the morning (receiving their remaining classes from their home high school).

== Curriculum ==
There are two curricula at SVGS:

The curriculum for the Math Science and Technology program includes the following college prep and dual enrollment classes: Research and Engineering, Robotics, Advanced Technology, Astrophysics, AP Computer Science, Pre Calculus, AP Calculus, DE Calculus, DE Discrete Mathematics, AP Statistics, DE Molecular Biology, AP Environmental Science, DE Environmental Chemistry, DE Physics, and AP Chemistry.

The curriculum for the Arts and Humanities program includes DE Acting I (through JMU), Acting II, DE Introduction to Theatre (through JMU), Advanced Dramatic Theories and Criticism, advanced art classes, DE Humanities 111/112, DE Communication, DE Psychology, and DE The Humanities in Western Culture (through BRCC).

== Contributing schools ==
- Buffalo Gap High School
- Fort Defiance High School
- Riverheads High School
- Staunton High School
- Stuarts Draft High School
- Waynesboro High School
- Wilson Memorial High School

== Extracurricular activities ==
- Electric Vehicle Team
- Robotics Team
- Network Team
- Envirothon Team
- Outreach (with elementary and middle schoolers)
