= VHSL Group 3A West Region =

High school athletic league in Virginia, US

The Group 3A West Region is a division of the Virginia High School League. The region was formed in 2013 when the VHSL adopted a six classification format and eliminated the previous three classification system. For the purpose of regular season competition, schools may compete within districts that existed prior to 2013, while post-season competition will be organized within four conferences that make up each region.

== Current Conference Alignment ==
=== Conference 29 ===
- Broadway High School of Broadway, Virginia
- Fluvanna County High School of Palmyra, Virginia
- Fort Defiance High School of Fort Defiance, Virginia
- Monticello High School of Charlottesville, Virginia
- Spotswood High School of Penn Laird, Virginia
- Turner Ashby High School of Bridgewater, Virginia
- Waynesboro High School of Waynesboro, Virginia

=== Conference 30 ===
- Brookville High School of Lynchburg, Virginia
- Heritage High School of Lynchburg, Virginia
- Liberty High School of Bedford, Virginia
- Rustburg High School of Rustburg, Virginia
- Tunstall High School of Dry Fork, Virginia

=== Conference 31 ===
- Alleghany High School of Covington, Virginia
- Lord Botetourt High School of Daleville, Virginia
- Magna Vista High School of Ridgeway, Virginia
- Northside High School of Roanoke, Virginia
- Rockbridge County High School of Lexington, Virginia
- Staunton River High School of Moneta, Virginia

=== Conference 32 ===
- Abingdon High School of Abingdon, Virginia
- Blacksburg High School of Blacksburg, Virginia
- Cave Spring High School of Roanoke, Virginia
- Christiansburg High School of Christiansburg, Virginia
- Hidden Valley High School of Roanoke, Virginia
- Patrick County High School of Stuart, Virginia

Jmu
