= Shenandoah District (VHSL) =

The Shenandoah District is a sports conference of the Virginia High School League which draws its members from the central part of the Shenandoah Valley, specifically clustered around Staunton and Waynesboro. The schools in the Shenandoah District compete in Region 1B with the schools of the Bull Run District, the Dogwood District, the James River District, the Tidewater District, and the Tri-Rivers District.

== Member schools ==
School	Location	Mascot	Colors	2022-23 9–12 enrollment
Buffalo Gap High School	Swoope	Bison		403
Fort Defiance High School	Fort Defiance	Indians		787
Riverheads High School	Staunton	Gladiators		460
Staunton High School	Staunton	Storm		755
Stuarts Draft High School	Stuarts Draft	Cougars		722
Waynesboro High School	Waynesboro	Little Giants		837
Wilson Memorial High School	Fishersville	Green Hornets		762
Rockbridge County High School	Lexington	Wildcats		976
Alleghany High School	Covington	Cougars		845

== Former Members ==
School	Location	Mascot	Colors	Current District
East Rockingham High School	Elkton	Eagles		Valley
Luray High School	Luray	Bulldogs		Bull Run
Page County High School	Shenandoah	Panthers		Bull Run
Stonewall Jackson High School	Quicksburg	Generals		Bull Run
