= Tinkling Spring Presbyterian Church =

Historic church in Virginia, US

- U.S. National Register of Historic Places
- Virginia Landmarks Register
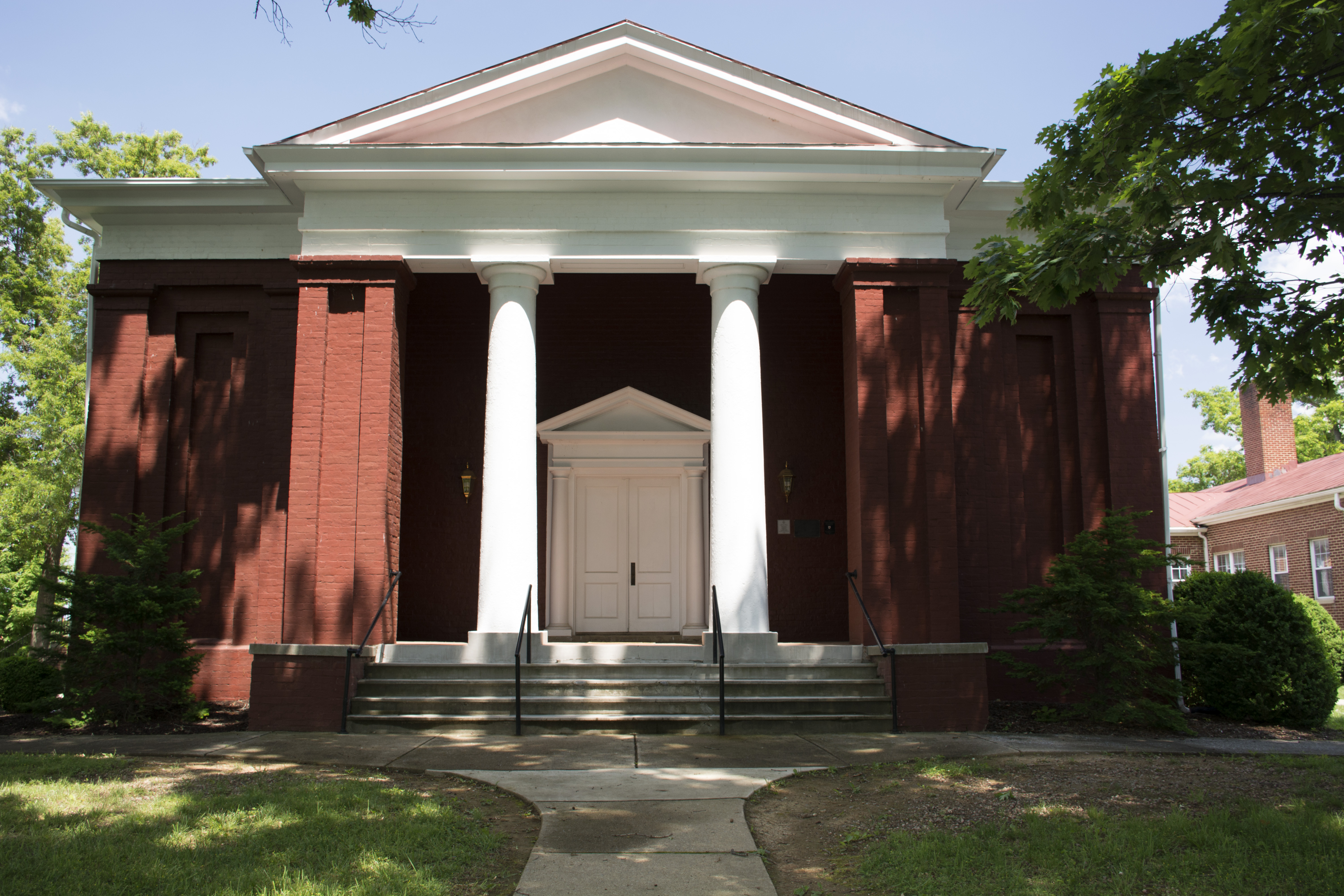

- Location within Virginia Location within the United States
- Location: VA 608, 1 mile (1.6 km) south of the junction with VA 636 and VA 631, Fishersville, Virginia
- Coordinates: 38°05′06″N 78°58′59″W
- Area: 10 acres (4.0 ha)
- Built: 1850
- Architect: Dabney, Robert Lewis
- Architectural style: Greek Revival
- NRHP reference No.: 73001993
- VLR No.: 007-0033

Significant dates
- Added to NRHP: April 11, 1973
- Designated VLR: January 16, 1973

The Tinkling Spring Presbyterian Church is a Presbyterian church founded in 1740, and is the second-oldest Presbyterian congregation in the Valley of Virginia (the Shenandoah Valley). Its historic 1850 Greek Revival building was listed on the National Register of Historic Places (NRHP) in 1973.

== History and description ==
The church's first building was a log structure built during 1742–1748. Much of the cost of the original meeting house was underwritten by Colonel James Patton. It took nearly three years to finish, with some controversy between Patton and his uncle John Lewis over where it was to be located. The first service was held there on 14 April 1745, when the Reverend John Craig wrote: "This being the first day we meet at the contentious meeting-house, about half-built." The log structure was replaced by a stone building in 1790.

The Greek Revival church is its third building, and was designed by Robert Lewis Dabney who served as pastor there from 1852–1857. The building, along with two other churches designed by Dabney, is credited with influencing ecclesiastical architecture in Virginia. Dabney designed at least two other NRHP-listed churches, Briery Church, in Briery, Virginia, and New Providence Presbyterian Church, near Brownsburg, Virginia.

The brick building is in the form of a temple with a pedimented diastyle Doric portico in the center of the facade. Recessed panels are incorporated in each anta, with another set of recessed panels flanking the portico. Brick pilasters frame the panels in addition to the four stained glass windows on the east and west sides. The west entrance has a pediment which is supported by Tuscan columns. The west door is flanked by a pair of Doric pilasters and is surmounted by a pediment with dentil cornice and a plain frieze. The building has a one-story addition in the rear which adheres to the character of the main structure, using panelled bays framed by brick pilasters. A later gable-roofed addition is connected to the church by a brick passageway to the east.

== Bibliography ==
- Wilson, Howard McKnight (1974). The Tinkling Spring: Headwater of Freedom : A Study of the Church and Her People, 1732-1952 (Second ed.). Tinkling Spring and Hermitage Presbyterian Churches. OCLC 1120317.
