= Wilson Memorial High School =

Location
- 189 Hornet Rd; Fishersville, Virginia 22939; United States; 38°7′16.5″N 78°59′6.3″W

Information
- Funding type: Public school
- Established: September 11, 1947
- Locale: Rural, Fringe
- School district: Augusta County Public Schools
- NCES District ID: 5100300
- Superintendent: Dr. Kelly F. Troxell
- NCES School ID: 510030000138
- Principal: Crystal Hanger
- Teaching staff: 59.00 (FTE)
- Grades: 9–12
- Enrollment: 837 (2024–25)
- Student to teacher ratio: 14.19
- Language: English
- Colors: Green, Vegas Gold
- Athletics conference: Virginia High School League; Region 3C; Shenandoah District
- Mascot: The Green Hornets
- Rivals: Stuarts Draft High School; Riverheads High School; Alleghany High school; Staunton High School; Fort Defiance High School
- Feeder schools: Wilson Elementary School, Hugh K. Cassell Elementary School, Wilson Middle School
- Website: Wilson Memorial High School

Wilson Memorial High School is a public school located in Fishersville, Virginia. The school is named after the 28th President of the United States, Thomas Woodrow Wilson, who was born in nearby Staunton, Virginia. WMHS, home of the Green Hornets, is located in the Woodrow Wilson Complex, which also consists of the Wilson Workforce and Rehabilitation Center, Augusta County Public Schools Board offices, Valley Career and Technical Center, Shenandoah Valley Governor's School, Valley Academy, Wilson Elementary School, and Wilson Middle School.

== History ==
The school's first class began on 11 September 1947 after Augusta County acquired a portion of the land used by the United States Army's former Woodrow Wilson General Hospital during World War II. Fifteen buildings were converted into classrooms and offices for the school after the hospital's last patient departed on March 31, 1946.

By 2007 a $20 million renovation had been completed at the current Wilson Memorial.

== Notable alumni ==
Maven Huffman, Youtuber and former professional wrestler for WWE
