= Maven (wrestler) =

American professional wrestler and YouTuber (born 1976)

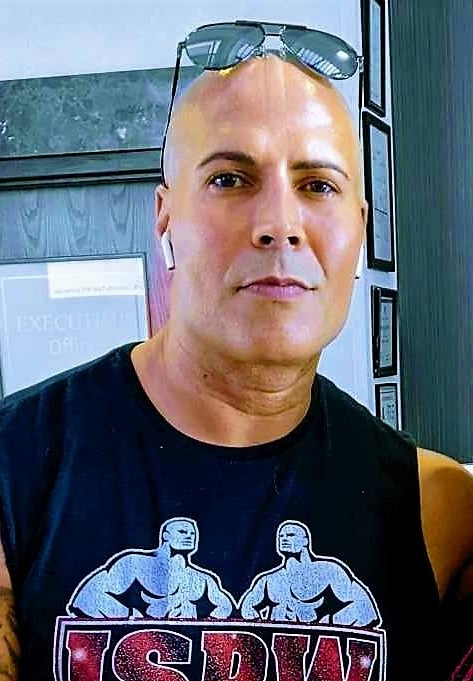
- Maven in 2023

Personal information
- Born: Maven Klate Huffman; November 26, 1976 (age 49) Nashville, Tennessee, U.S.
- Education: Eastern Mennonite University (BS)
- Life partner: Gina (2012–present)

Professional wrestling career
- Ring name(s): Maven; Maven Huffman
- Billed height: 6 ft 2 in (188 cm)
- Billed weight: 220 lb (100 kg)
- Billed from: Charlottesville, Virginia
- Trained by: Al Snow; Tazz; Heartland Wrestling Association
- Debut: October 2, 2001

YouTube information
- Channel: Maven Huffman
- Years active: 2023–present
- Genre: Professional wrestling
- Subscribers: 936 thousand
- Views: 337.7 million
- Last updated: September 19, 2026

Maven Klate Huffman (born November 26, 1976) is an American social media personality and semi-retired professional wrestler. He is the inaugural male winner of Tough Enough and went on to wrestle under his first name in the World Wrestling Federation/Entertainment (WWF/WWE) from 2001 to 2005, in which time he became a three-time WWF Hardcore Champion and was named 'Rookie of the Year' by Pro Wrestling Illustrated.

Since his departure from WWE, he has made occasional appearances on the independent circuit and in the media, including two years as a presenter on HSN. In 2023, Maven launched his YouTube channel which has amassed over 900,000 subscribers, on which he shares his experiences in professional wrestling.

== Early life ==
Maven Huffman was born on November 26, 1976, in Nashville, Tennessee, but raised in Crimora, Virginia. He has African and European ancestry. After his father left the family, his mother died by suicide the day after Christmas in 1978 when he was two years old. He was adopted by his maternal uncle and his aunt, who began raising him at age two. His aunt died from cancer in 2004. Huffman graduated from Wilson Memorial High School in Fishersville, Virginia, before attending Eastern Mennonite University.

In 1999, he moved to Portland, Oregon, where he began playing baseball for the Aloha Knights team. Prior to becoming a professional wrestler, Huffman was a middle school teacher at Twality Middle School in Tigard, Oregon, for two years.

== Professional wrestling career ==
=== World Wrestling Federation / World Wrestling Entertainment (2001–2005) ===
==== Tough Enough and Hardcore Championship (2001-2002) ====
Huffman began his professional wrestling career in 2001 upon being selected to participate in the inaugural season of Tough Enough, a reality television show used by the World Wrestling Federation (WWF) to find new WWF stars. Ultimately, Maven would become the co-winner of the competition alongside Nidia Guenard, and he was sent to the Heartland Wrestling Association (HWA) to receive further training.

On the October 4 episode of SmackDown!, Maven made his in-ring debut against Tazz, one of his Tough Enough trainers, who forced him to submit to the Tazzmission. Following the match, Tazz helped Maven to his feet before clotheslining him, thus starting a feud between the two. After losing to Tazz via submission in a rematch the following week on SmackDown!, Maven clotheslined Tazz following the match. On the October 18 episode of SmackDown!, Maven won his first wrestling match as he defeated Tazz with assistance from Tough Enough co-winner Nidia Guenard. Following this brief feud, Maven began a feud with The Undertaker after he eliminated The Undertaker from the 2002 Royal Rumble by dropkicking him from behind; The Undertaker responded in turn by returning to the ring, eliminating Maven. He proceeded to hit him with a steel chair, and beating him all the way back to the concession stand area.

On the January 28, 2002, episode of Raw, Maven was awarded a title bout by WWF co-owner Ric Flair against Chris Jericho for the Undisputed WWF Championship by virtue of never actually being eliminated from the Royal Rumble, but lost after submitting to the Walls of Jericho. After the match, Maven was attacked by The Undertaker. On the February 7 episode of SmackDown!, Maven faced The Undertaker for his WWF Hardcore Championship, and after interference from The Rock and his Tough Enough trainer Al Snow, Maven defeated The Undertaker to win the Hardcore Championship, the first championship of his career. Their feud ended after The Undertaker defeated Maven and Al Snow in a 2-on-1 handicap match when The Undertaker made Maven submit to the Dragon Sleeper. At WrestleMania X8, Maven lost the Hardcore Championship to Spike Dudley during a match with Goldust due to the title's unique 24/7 rule, but won the title back the same night from Christian due to the same rule. The following night on Raw, Maven was attacked by a debuting Brock Lesnar during his Hardcore Championship defense against Al Snow and Spike Dudley. Maven was the tenth pick for the SmackDown! brand in the WWF draft and subsequently brought the Hardcore Championship to SmackDown!, but he was punished by Vince McMahon after he lost the title to Raw superstar Raven on the March 28 episode of SmackDown!. Maven was traded to the Raw brand on November 4, 2002, where he confronted Christopher Nowinski with his former trainer Al Snow.

==== Various feuds and departure (2003-2005) ====
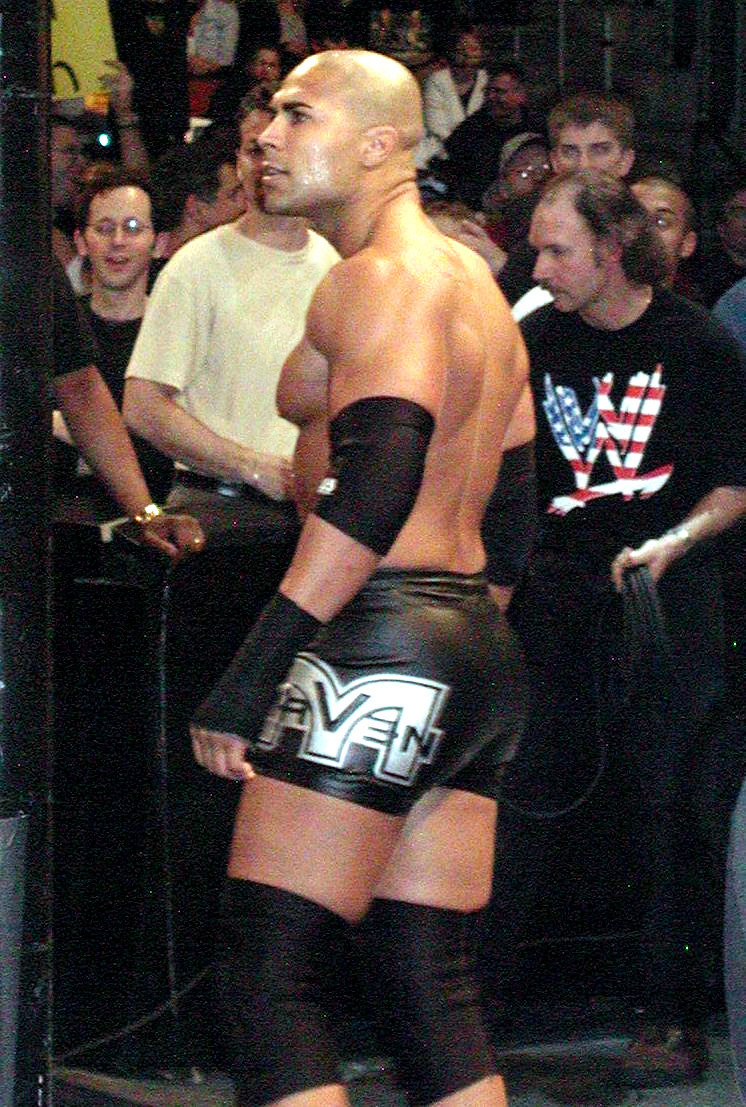
Maven in 2003

Maven entered the 2003 Royal Rumble. He attempted to eliminate The Undertaker by using a dropkick like he did the previous year, but failed and was eliminated by The Undertaker. Maven fought World Heavyweight Champion Triple H on the March 10 episode of Raw, but lost. In 2004, Maven received the biggest push in his career, even gaining a victory over then-Evolution member Batista. Maven then took part in an Elimination Match at Survivor Series, teaming with Randy Orton, Chris Benoit, and Chris Jericho to face Triple H, Batista, Gene Snitsky, and Edge for the power to control Raw for one month. Maven was attacked backstage by Snitsky prior to the match, but after Benoit was eliminated, Maven arrived to join his teammates. He was eventually eliminated by Triple H. Orton was the sole survivor and as a result, he and his team had control of Raw for one month.

Maven was the first to control Raw, booking himself in a World Heavyweight Championship match against Triple H on the November 15 episode of Raw, who tried to get out of it by offering Maven a place in Evolution. He declined, but despite interference from Jericho, Benoit, and Orton, Triple H retained the title due to interference from Snitsky and Ric Flair.

On the November 29 episode of Raw, Maven competed in a battle royal to determine the number one contender for the World Heavyweight Championship, but was eliminated by Eugene. The following week on Raw, Maven faced Eugene in a singles match, which he lost by disqualification after attacking Eugene's injured knee during the match before choking him out. After the match, Maven attacked Eugene's tag team partner William Regal as Regal came to help him, thus turning heel in the process.

Following this, Maven began feuding with Shelton Benjamin over Benjamin's Intercontinental Championship, culminating at New Year's Revolution in a singles match for the title. Before the start of the match, Maven proceeded to blast the Puerto Rican crowd before Benjamin quickly defeated him in just a matter of minutes by using a roll-up. Maven then cut a promo on Benjamin, stating that the match "didn't count", and challenged him to a re-match. Benjamin accepted, and Maven was defeated in only seconds yet again following the T-Bone Suplex.

Following his feud with Benjamin, Maven formed a tag team with Simon Dean, where he acted as a dedicated user of Dean's "Simon System" brand of nutritional products. After beating jobbers for a month, at Backlash, Maven and Simon Dean competed in a Tag Team Turmoil match for the World Tag Team Championship which was won by The Hurricane and Rosey. The team came to an end when Dean was traded to the SmackDown! brand, while Maven was subsequently released by WWE on July 5, 2005. According to Huffman, Vice President of Talent Relations John Laurinaitis explained he was let go for not having progressed to the level the company was expecting, especially after having been advised to put more focus on honing his ring-work prior to shows.

In October 2023 in his YouTube video, Huffman revealed that Laurinaitis had offered him to return in 2008, saying that Huffman had been gone long enough to not be known as the "Tough Enough kid" anymore if he returned. Huffman declined due to the guaranteed money he was making in his Home Shopping Network role at the time, a decision he regretted. In a December video, Huffman revealed that WWE was ready to offer him to be trained as an announcer at the WWE Performance Center. The deal fell through as his interview with WWE was on March 11, 2020, the day when the World Health Organization announced that COVID-19 became a pandemic.

=== Total Nonstop Action Wrestling/United Wrestling Federation (2006–2007) ===
After WWE, Maven joined United Wrestling Federation Live on February 10, 2006, and teamed alongside Jeff Jarrett to defeat Team 3D. On March 31, 2006, Maven wrestled his first match for Total Nonstop Action Wrestling, where he and Jarrett lost to Jeff Hardy and Kip James in a tag team match. After wrestling sporadically for the UWF and on house shows for TNA throughout the year, Maven wrestled his final match on October 5, 2007, where he lost to Test in a match for Full Throttle Wrestling.

=== Independent circuit (2015–present) ===
On July 11, 2015, Maven announced his return to pro wrestling. His return match took place at Brian Myers' Create A Pro Wrestling Academy in Long Island, New York on July 19, 2015. Maven teamed with Johnny Clash to defeat The Warren Cousins (Mikey Warren and TJ Warren) in his first match since 2007.

On September 26, 2015, Maven teamed with Brian Myers in a losing effort against The Cam-An Connection (Anthony Greene and Cam Zagami).

On April 16, 2016, Maven teamed with Myers and Pat Buck in a six man tag team match losing to Aesthetic Males (Beefcake Charlie, Damian Gibbs and Mike Del) in a match for the WrestlePro promotion.

Maven returned to wrestling in 2021. He defeated Matt Cardona for the vacated FWF Tough Enough Trophy Street Fight title on October 9, 2022. On July 23, 2023, he won a 26-man battle royal for Dropkick Diabetes 7 in Youngstown, Ohio. On April 27, 2024, he entered Reality of Wrestling’s 30 Man Last Stand Rumble at number 21, eliminating Inferno Tiger before being eliminated by Quentin Winters in the same way that Maven had eliminated The Undertaker in the 2002 Royal Rumble Match.

== Television career ==
In July 2005, Huffman was featured in episode three of MTV's The 70s House where he and other WWE wrestlers competed in a game of dodge ball.

In March 2006, it was announced by VH1 that Huffman would be a participant in The Surreal Life season 6. On the first episode, he was picked by the existing castmates as the seventh and final cast member in a "15 More Minutes of Fame Reality Hunk Pageant," beating four other reality "hunks", including former American Idol contestant Corey Clark.

Subsequently, Huffman was a host for a show on BET J called BET's J List. He also appeared on the Home Shopping Network's weekday morning show, HSN Today, as its exercise and wellness expert as well as the co-host of HSN's NFL Pro Football Fan Shop. He was terminated from HSN after his arrest in Florida in 2012 for an offense related to prescription drugs.

== YouTube career ==
Maven Huffman

YouTube information
- Channel: Maven Huffman
- Years active: 2023–present
- Genre: Pro Wrestling
- Subscribers: 942 thousand
- Views: 349.7 million
- Last updated: Nov 6, 2026

Huffman launched a YouTube channel in June 2023. He focuses his content on discussions of his WWE career and insights into life as a professional wrestler. The channel amassed more than 100,000 subscribers in a month and eventually reached the half-million mark.

== Filmography ==
=== Television ===
Year	Title	Role	Notes
2001	Tough Enough	Himself	
2002	Blind Date	Himself	
2005	MTV's The 70s House	Himself	
2006	The Surreal Life	Himself	
2006	BET's J List	Himself	Host
2010	HSN Today	Himself	Host

=== Video games ===
Year	Title	Notes
2002	WWE SmackDown! Shut Your Mouth	

== Personal life ==
Huffman is a Christian, and is in a relationship with a woman named Gina.

As of 2021, Huffman works in finance on Wall Street.

On April 2, 2012, Huffman was arrested in Florida after he was caught doctor shopping for oxycodone and hydrocodone, and was released on a $2,000 bond. After his arrest, Huffman underwent rehab through WWE's wellness program.

== Championships and accomplishments ==
- Pro Wrestling Illustrated
  - PWI Rookie of the Year (2002)
  - PWI ranked him #88 of the top 500 singles wrestlers in the PWI 500 in 2003
- World Wrestling Federation
  - WWF Hardcore Championship (3 times)
  - Tough Enough I – with Nidia Guenard
