= Augusta Military Academy =

- U.S. National Register of Historic Places
- Virginia Landmarks Register
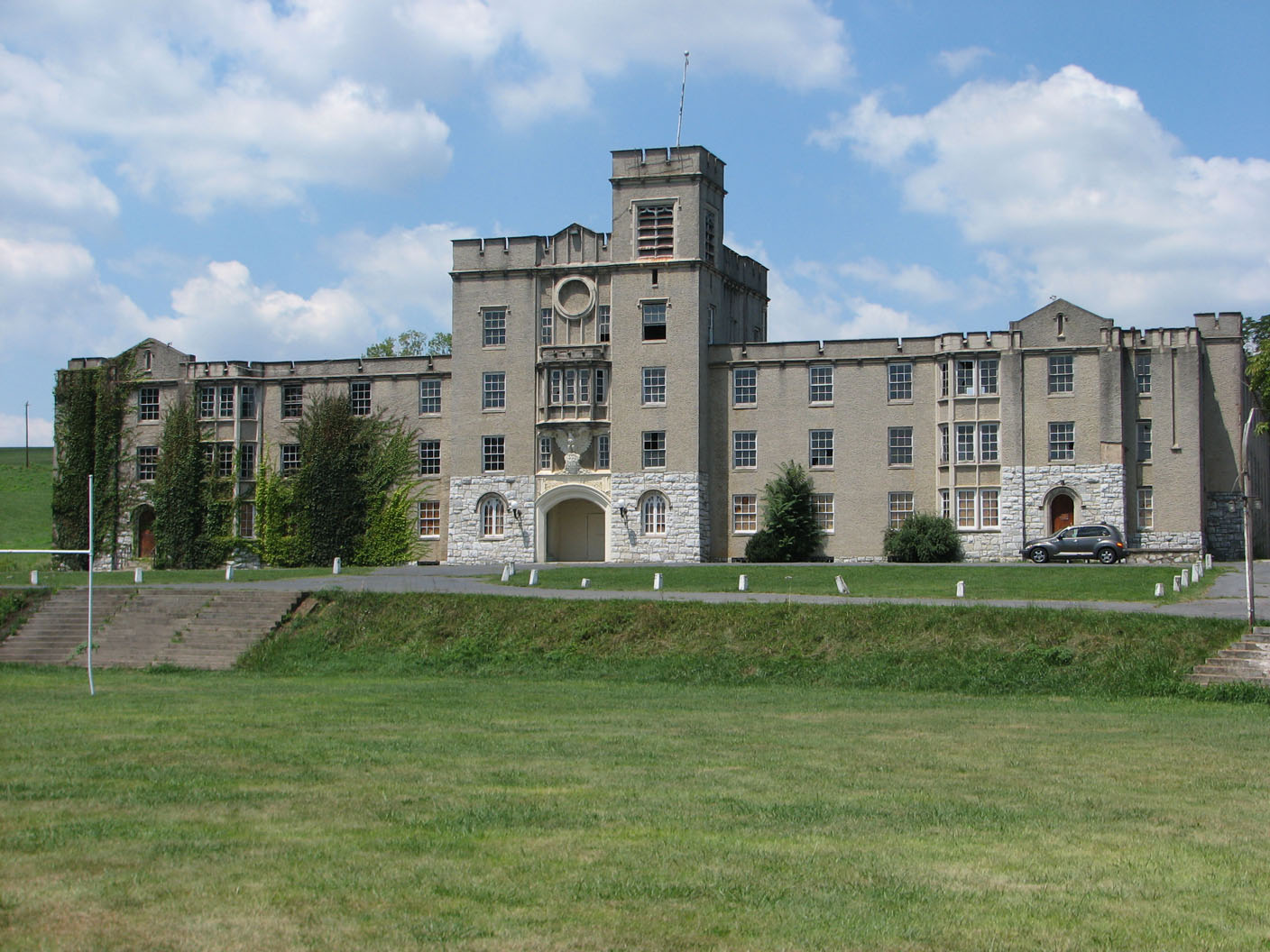
- Main Barracks, August 2006

- Location within Virginia Location within the United States
- Location: North of Staunton on U.S. 11, Fort Defiance, Virginia
- Coordinates: 38°14′15″N 078°58′37″W
- Area: 14 acres (5.7 ha)
- Built by: Collins, T.J.
- Architectural style: Gothic, Neo-Gothic
- NRHP reference No.: 83003258
- VLR No.: 007-0241

Significant dates
- Added to NRHP: February 10, 1983
- Designated VLR: September 16, 1982

The Augusta Military Academy (AMA) was a secondary education military academy in Fort Defiance, Virginia, United States. The school was established in 1865 (161 years ago) by Confederate veteran Charles Summerville Roller as the Augusta Male Academy and formally became a military academy in 1880 (146 years ago). It combined classical studies with a military curriculum and was officially named Augusta Military Academy in 1890. At the time, it was one of the first military preparatory schools in the Commonwealth of Virginia. It was one of the first such schools in the United States to adopt the Junior Reserve Officers' Training Corps program in 1919.

Until its closure in 1984 (42 years ago), the Academy had attracted over 7,000 students from the United States and abroad. Today it is owned and operated as a campground for the Virginia District of the United Pentecostal Church International. It is located on U.S. Route 11, also known as the Lee Highway.

== History ==
=== 19th century ===
Charles Summerville Roller was born in Mt. Sidney, Virginia on May 8, 1839. He secured his early education at Parkins Classical School and Mossy Creek Academy before entering the University of Virginia in 1859. At the outbreak of the Civil War he left his undergraduate studies and joined the Confederate forces, serving for most of the duration of the war with Company E, 1st Virginia Regiment under the command of General J. E. B. Stuart's cavalry.

When the War was over, there was a need in the Fort Defiance community for the resumption of some form of schooling. Four years or more had passed since most of the area's youth had received any education. Mr. Roller, aware of the situation, promptly went to work teaching boys, many of them veterans of the war, in a simple, red brick structure (now demolished) which formerly stood on the property of Augusta Old Stone Church, just north of the current AMA campus.

Roller's services to the community did not go unrewarded; he was elected to serve in the Virginia Legislature from 1871 to 1873. In his absence, education in the Fort Defiance area came to a standstill and he returned to Augusta County with renewed determination to establish a proper school for boys".

In 1878 Roller chose a site three hundred yards above the west side of the Valley Pike toll road adjoining the Old Stone Church (now U. S. Route 11) as the place upon which to build his residence and Academy which was completed in 1879 as the Academy's first building.

Over the next 18 years, Roller constructed additional units for the Academy's programs and by 1897, a group of frame buildings stood in a line parallel to the Valley Pike occupying the same space now filled by the brick collegiate structures which replaced them in the early 20th century. The original frame buildings were specifically designed for Academy use, and for their time, were quite satisfactory. On the right side of the Roller home was constructed a large wooden tower which served as an armory. A two- story wing was added to the left of the Roller home; the first floor of which was designed to serve as the Academy dining room. Although it has been enlarged and completely remodeled numerous times, the Roller home with its original Academy dining room is still in use today.

Because many of Professor Roller's first students were veterans of the Civil War, a military-type discipline for the classroom offered a means of control. The success enjoyed by this discipline early on, encouraged the founder to introduce a complete military system between 1880 and 1882. The only precedent for such a venture in Virginia was the operation of Virginia Military Institute at Lexington, which itself followed the system of the United States Military Academy at West Point, New York. In the Academy's early years all the instructors at Augusta were V.M.I. graduates, and for classes in military instruction the prescribed War Department manuals were used. By 1888 the name Augusta Classical and Military Academy was adopted and then again in 1890 the name was changed to the present Augusta Military Academy (AMA).

=== 20th century ===
At the start of the 20th Century, AMA continued to function as it had since its inception. However, upon the death of its founder, C.S. Roller on August 26, 1907, control and operation of the school transferred to his 2 youngest sons, Thomas Roller and Charles Roller Jr. The Roller brothers were themselves graduates of AMA and had gone on to further their educations at UVA and VMI respectively. (NOTE: Charles Roller Jr’s friend and roommate at VMI was the distinguished George C. Marshall)

When the U.S.A. was drawn into the Great War, the Roller brothers debated over which of them should serve the country and which should stay to run the school. In the end, Charles Roller Jr, went off to war and spent 1917-1918 serving as a Captain with the 89th Division in France. It is believed that he conceived the “Ad Astra per Aspera Society” on the long boat ride home and that it became a reality for the school in 1925.

Under the combined leadership of the Roller brothers, AMA's enrollment and standing as a prestigious college preparatory school grew. In 1916 with the passage of the “National Defense Act of 1916” the Junior Reserve Officer Training Program (JROTC) was established and AMA became the first secondary school in the state of Virginia to officially include this program into its curriculum in 1921. This opened the door to Federal logistical support for the military program but in reality, had little effect on the school's operating principles - military instilled discipline was still a pivotal principle of the school's academic and athletic programs.

The early 20th century were years of expansion both in enrollment and physical presence and A.M.A. prospered becoming a school of international repute. When Thomas J. Roller died on March 10, 1946, his younger brother and co- principal Charles S. Roller, Jr., assumed all responsibilities for the school

== Buildings ==
As enrollment in the early 1900s grew, the need for more and improved buildings grew. Old wooden structures were torn down, additional instructional facilities were built along with new dormitories during the early part of the 20th century. Most notable (and recognizable) for AMA is the "Main Barracks"; a three-story, rectangular structure constructed of rough stucco walls above a limestone-faced first story in the tower. It features an off-center, four-story entrance tower. Construction of the structure was completed in 1915.

The Mess Hall/Library/Deanes Castle Dormitory (also known as The Roller House) was built in 1879 as the residence for founder Charles Summerville Roller. It is the two-story, double-pile, frame building sheathed in German siding and covered by a hipped, slate shingle roof. It is the only original structure remaining and was rebuilt/remodeled in 1999, today serving as the AMA Museum.

The year 1946 saw the dedication of a new science hall as part of the Academic Hall. In 1959 a new Mess Hall kitchen was built. Expansions in 1961 resulted in the completion of new classrooms above' the swimming pool and in 1963 a new stairway was erected on the back of the Main Barracks.

The neo-Gothic style Gymnasium/Academic Hall consists of three sections: the original gymnasium built in 1910 and the present Gymnasium built in 1929, connected by a swimming pool.

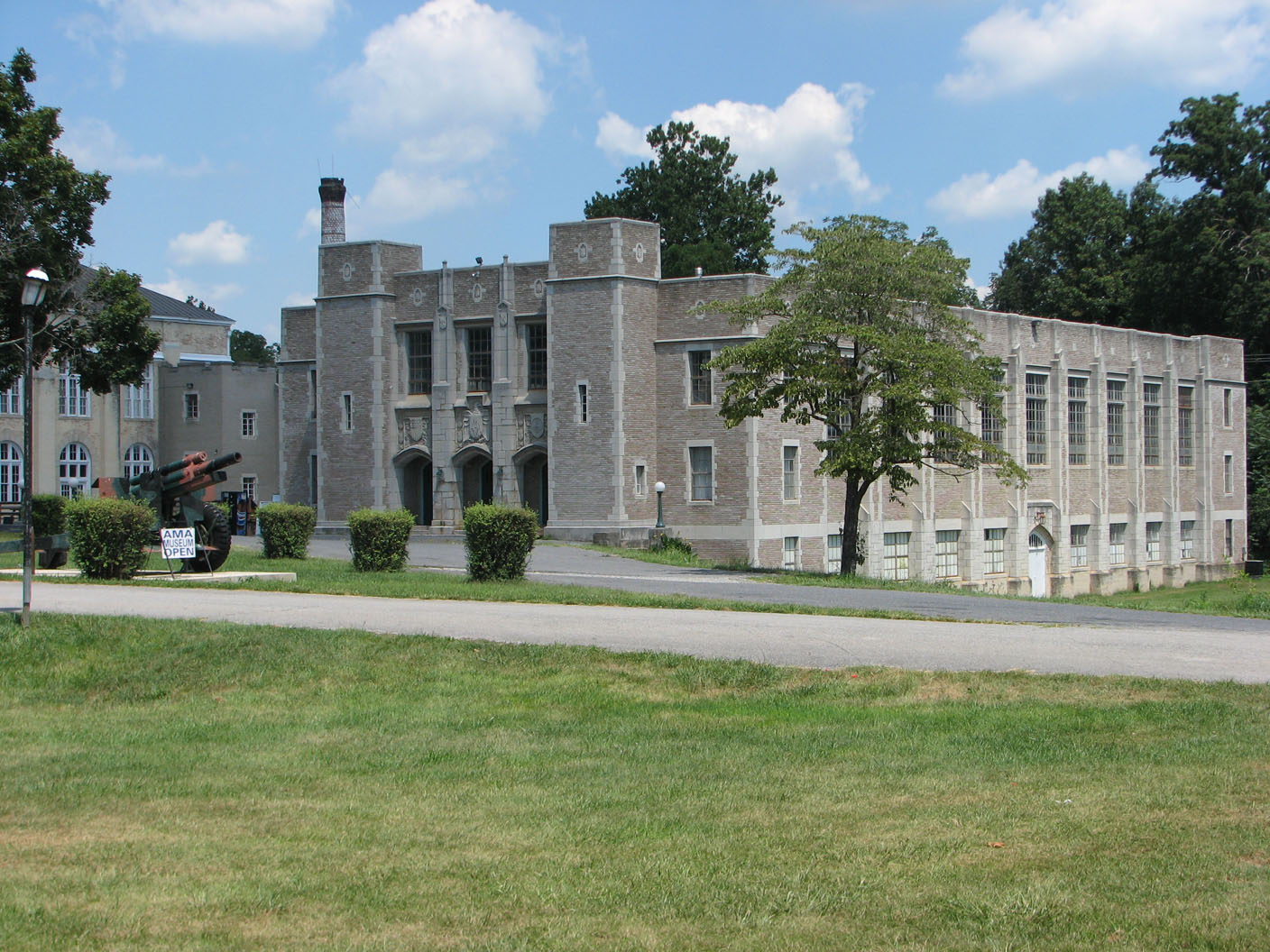
The Augusta Military Academy's fieldhouse

Each year, the Augusta Military Academy Museum hosts an alumni gathering. Among its notable alumni are Pulitzer Prize winning Author N. Scott Momaday who wrote House Made of Dawn, William H. Armstrong, the author of Sounder, and the Louisiana educator C. E. Byrd.

== Trivia ==
An episode of MTV's Fear was shot at the Augusta Military Academy. It was featured on Season 1, Episode 4 and was renamed "Hopkins Military Academy." This was mainly to protect the academy from local teenagers, ghost hunters and urban explorers.
