= Stewart Middle School =

Stewart Middle School' is the name of some schools in the US:

- Garland V. Stewart Middle Magnet School in Tampa, Florida
- Stewart Middle School (Tacoma, Washington)
- Stewart Middle School (Norristown, Pennsylvania)
- S. Gordon Stewart Middle School in Augusta County, Virginia.
- Raymond B. Stewart Middle School in Zephyrhills, Florida.
