= Augusta Stone Church =

Historic church in Virginia, United States

- U.S. National Register of Historic Places
- Virginia Landmarks Register
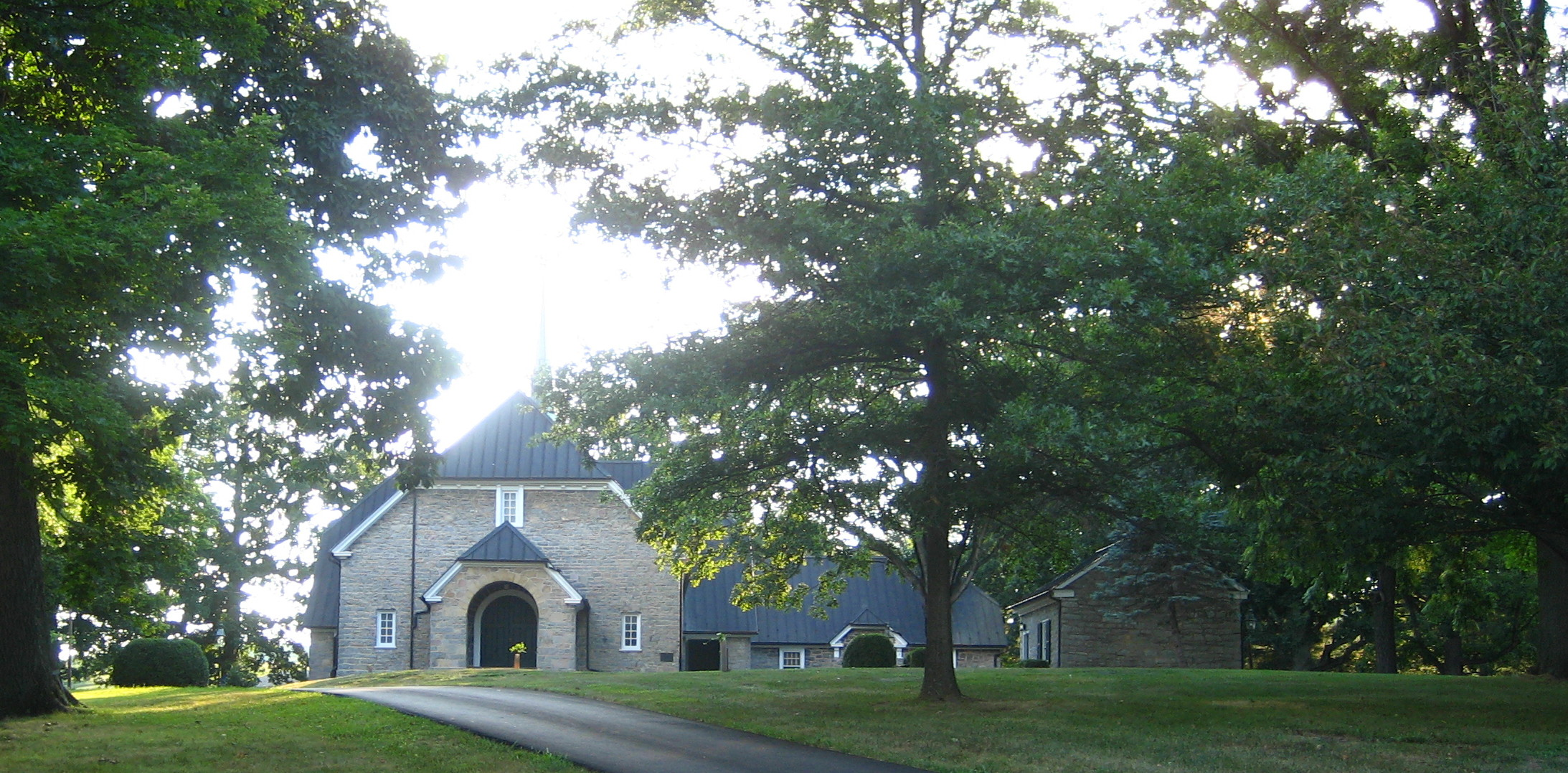

- Location within Virginia Location within the United States
- Location: U.S. 11, Fort Defiance, Virginia
- Coordinates: 38°14′17″N 078°58′32″W
- Area: 30 acres (12 ha)
- Built: 1749
- Architectural style: Colonial
- NRHP reference No.: 73001994
- VLR No.: 007-0004

Significant dates
- Added to NRHP: May 9, 1973
- Designated VLR: February 20, 1973

Augusta Stone Church is a Presbyterian (PCUSA) place of worship located in Augusta County in the Commonwealth of Virginia, USA in the unincorporated community of Fort Defiance. The church was one of two meeting houses established by The Congregation of the Triple Forks of the Shenandoah in the year 1740. Augusta Stone and the sister meeting house Tinkling Spring were both served by the Rev. John Craig. The final structure which was completed in 1749 is still in use and holds the distinction of being the oldest Presbyterian Church in continuous use in Virginia.

== History ==
The congregation was founded in 1740 by the Rev. John Craig, and a log meeting house was constructed 1/4-mile from the present stone church. The stone church was intended to serve as both a meeting house and a fort against Native American raids; construction began in 1747 and the building was dedicated on Sunday, January 22, 1749. An old tale says there is a "secret passageway" in the minister's office that was meant for a time of war. However, no member of the church has seen the alleged secret passageway, and there are no references to it in church records. In the early 1800s, the small community near the church became known as Fort Defiance. The stone church has been in continuous use since 1749, making it the oldest Presbyterian house of worship in continuous use in Virginia. Two major additions were added to the rear of the church. The transepts in the sanctuary and a wing of rooms and offices (designed by T.J. Collins) were added in 1921–22, and a large social hall (called "John Craig Hall") and kitchen were completed in 1956. The church has a museum on the property, in the old Session House (to the right of the main building in the photo), containing artifacts from the church's early history.

The two cemeteries at the church contain the graves of Revolutionary and Civil War veterans. The museum houses the baptismal records of the Rev. John Craig from 1740 to 1749.

== Location ==
Augusta Stone Church is located on U.S. Route 11 (also known as the Lee Highway) adjacent to Fort Defiance High, Clymore Elementary, and Stuart Gordon Middle schools in the Shenandoah Valley, eight miles north of Staunton and 15 miles south of Harrisonburg in the small, unincorporated community of Fort Defiance, Virginia.

== See also ==
- National Register of Historic Places listings in Augusta County, Virginia
