= Robert Lewis Dabney =

Southern Presbyterian Pastor & Theologian

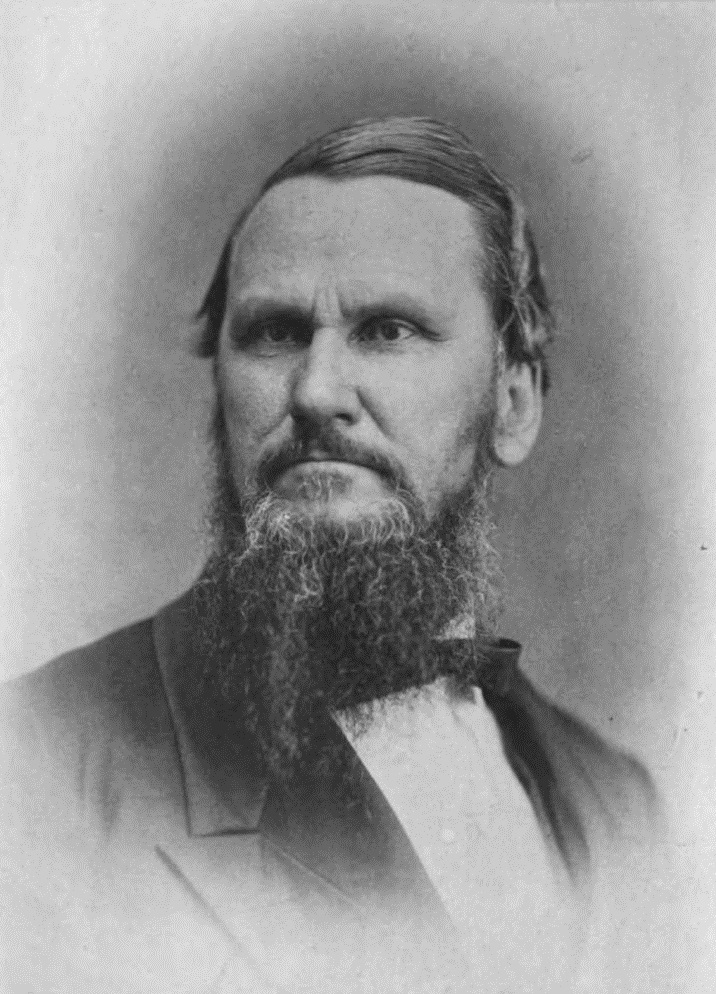
- Born: Robert Lewis Dabney; March 5, 1820
- Died: January 3, 1898 (aged 77)
- Resting place: Union Presbyterian Seminary Cemetery; Hampden-Sydney, Virginia, U.S.
- Education: Hampden-Sydney College; University of Virginia; Union Theological Seminary
- Occupations: Theologian; educator; architect
- Parent(s): Charles Dabney; Elizabeth Randolph Price Dabney.

Signature
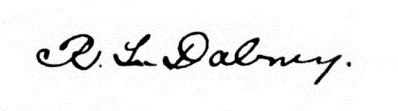

Robert Lewis Dabney (March 5, 1820 – January 3, 1898) was a Southern Presbyterian pastor and theologian, Confederate army chaplain, and architect from Virginia. He was also chief of staff and biographer to Stonewall Jackson; his biography of Jackson remains in print today.

Dabney and James Henley Thornwell were two of Southern Presbyterianism's most influential scholars. They were both Calvinist, Old School Presbyterians, and social conservatives. Some conservative Presbyterians, particularly within the Presbyterian Church in America and the Orthodox Presbyterian Church, still value their theological writings, although some within these churches have repudiated Dabney's and Thornwell's beliefs in support of white supremacy and antebellum slavery.

== Life and career ==
=== Early life ===
Robert Lewis Dabney was born on March 5, 1820. He was the sixth child (third son) of Charles William Dabney (1786–1833) and Elizabeth Randolph Price Dabney, and a descendant of Cornelius Dabney, who settled in Virginia in the 17th century. His brother, Charles William Dabney (1809–1895) was the captain of Company C, 15th Virginia Infantry Regiment.

Dabney graduated from Hampden-Sydney College with a Bachelor of Arts degree in 1837, and received a master's degree from the University of Virginia in 1842. He graduated from Union Theological Seminary in 1846.

=== Career ===
Dabney served as a missionary in Louisa County, Virginia, from 1846 to 1847 and a pastor at Tinkling Spring Presbyterian Church from 1847 to 1853, being also head master of a classical school for a portion of this time. He is considered a distinguished son of Providence Presbyterian Church. It was at Tinkling Spring that he met Margaret Lavinia Morrison. They were married on March 28, 1848. They had six sons together, three of whom died in childhood from diphtheria (two in 1855, the other in 1862). From 1853 to 1859, he was professor of ecclesiastical history and polity and from 1859 to 1869 adjunct professor of systematic theology in Virginia's Union Theological Seminary, where he later became full professor of systematics.

Dabney – whose wife was a third cousin to Confederate General Thomas "Stonewall" Jackson's wife – participated in the American Civil War on the Confederate side. During the summer of 1861 he was chaplain of the 18th Virginia Infantry, and in the following year was invited by Jackson to be his chief of staff; he served with Jackson during the Valley Campaign and the Seven Days Battles.

In 1867, he published A Defense of Virginia, and Through Her, of the South, in Recent and Pending Contests Against the Sectional Party, an apologia for slavery.

In 1868, he delivered "Ecclesiastical Relation of Negroes", a speech advocating for white supremacy in the church.

In 1883, he was appointed professor of mental and moral philosophy in the University of Texas.

By 1894, failing health compelled him to retire from active life, although he still lectured occasionally. He was co-pastor, with his brother-in-law B. M. Smith, of the Hampden-Sydney College Church 1858 to 1874, also serving Hampden-Sydney College in a professorial capacity on occasions of vacancies in its faculty.

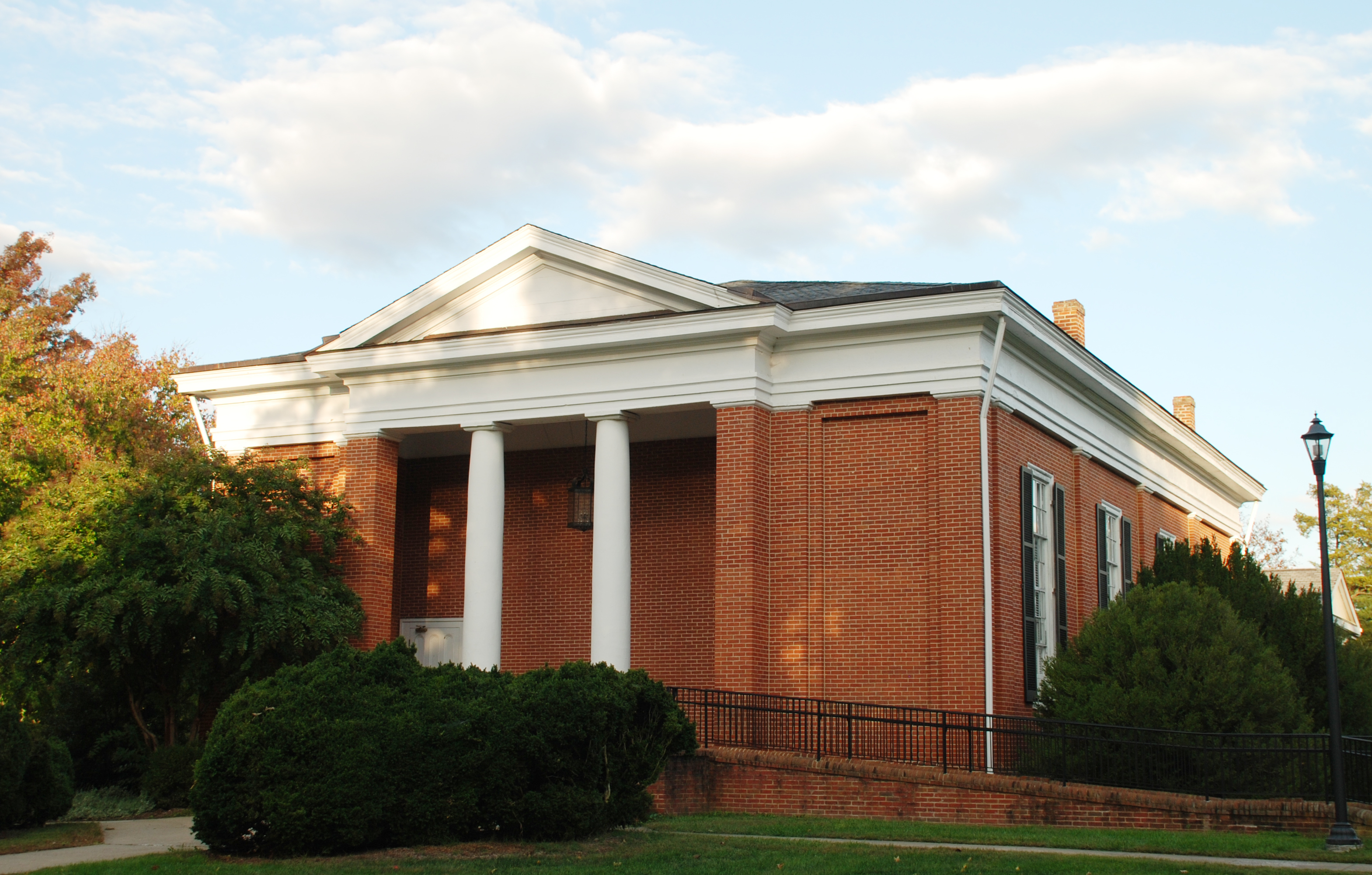
College Church at Hampden–Sydney College, c. 1860, designed by Dabney.

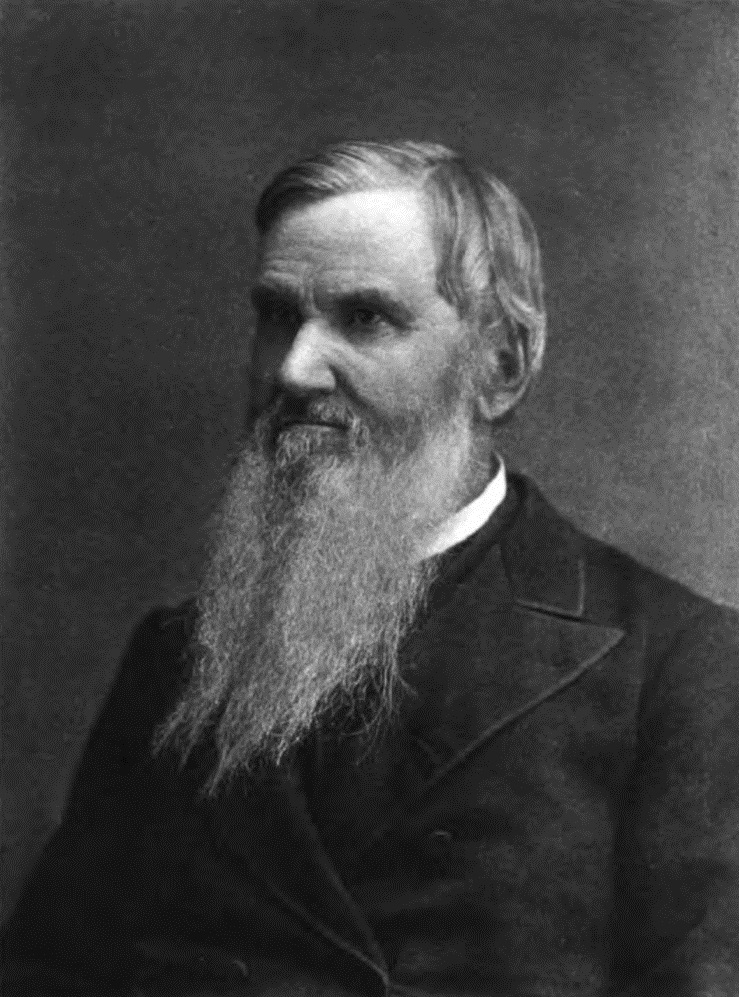
Portrait of Dabney.

=== Architecture ===
Dabney's designs for the Tinkling Spring Presbyterian Church and for two other churches in Virginia are credited with influencing church architecture in Virginia. Three works associated with Dabney are listed on the U.S. National Register of Historic Places: Tinkling Spring Presbyterian Church; Briery Church, in Briery, Virginia; and New Providence Presbyterian Church, near Brownsburg, Virginia.

=== Death ===
Dabney died in Victoria, Texas on January 3, 1898, due to complications from an acute illness.

== Major works ==
- Memoir of Rev. Dr. Francis S. Sampson (1855), whose commentary on Hebrews he edited (1857)
- Life of General Thomas J. Jackson (1866)
- A Defense of Virginia, and Through Her, of the South, in Recent and Pending Contests Against the Sectional Party (1867), an apologia for chattel slavery.
- Ecclesiastical Relation of Negroes: Speech of Rev. Robert L. Dabney, in the Synod of Virginia, Nov. 9, 1867; Against the Ecclesiastical Equality of Negro Preachers in Our Church, and Their Right to Rule Over White Christians (1868)
- Lectures on Sacred Rhetoric (1870)
- Women's Rights (1871)
- Syllabus and Notes of the Course of Systematic and Polemic Theology (1871; 2nd ed. 1878), later republished as Systematic Theology.
- Systematic Theology (1878)
- Sensualistic Philosophy of the Nineteenth Century Examined (1875; 2nd ed. 1887)
- Practical Philosophy (1897)
- The Doctrinal Various Readings of the New Testament Greek (HTML)
- Penal Character of the Atonement of Christ Discussed in the Light of Recent Popular Heresies (1898, posthumous), on the satisfaction view of the atonement.
- Discussions (1890–1897), Four volumes of his shorter essays, edited by C. R. Vaughan.
1. Theological and Evangelical (1890)
2. Evangelical (1891)
3. Philosophical (1892)
4. Secular (1897)

Also expanded later into five volumes, with the fifth volume consisting of selected shorter works, edited by J. H. Varner, published by Sprinkle Publications in 1999.
