= Waynesboro High School =

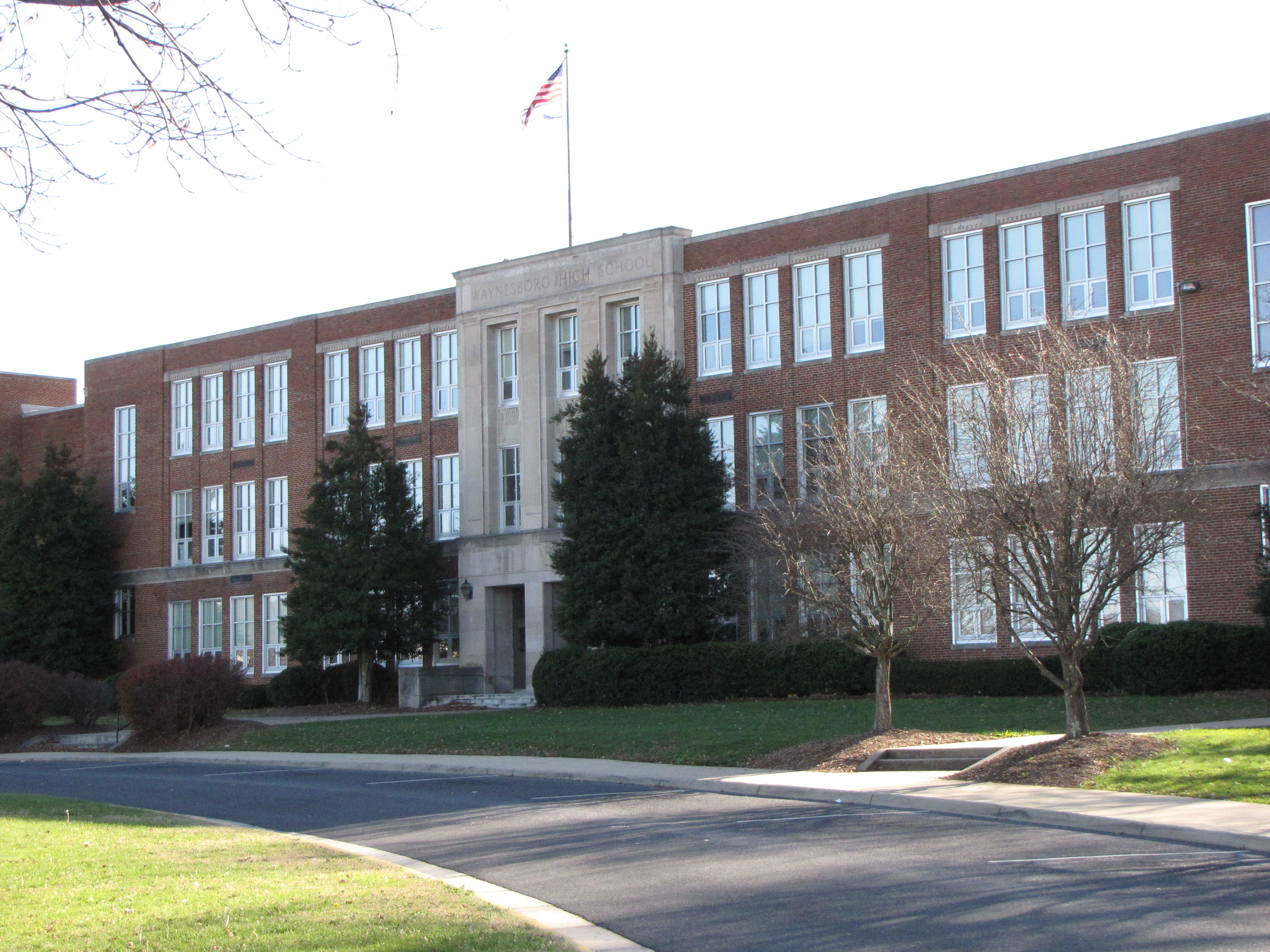
- Waynesboro High School

Location
- 1200 West Main Street; Waynesboro, Virginia 22980; United States; 38°4′14″N 78°53′52.1″W

Information
- Type: Public
- Opened: 1938
- Status: Open
- Locale: Suburban, Small
- School district: Waynesboro Public Schools
- NCES District ID: 5103930
- NCES School ID: 510393001759
- Principal: Bryan Stamm
- Teaching staff: 62.50 (on an FTE basis)
- Grades: 9–12
- Enrollment: 926 (2024–25)
- Student to teacher ratio: 14.82
- Colors: Purple and Vegas Gold
- Athletics conference: VHSL Group 3A West Region; Shenandoah District
- Team name: Little Giants
- Rival: Staunton High School; Stuarts Draft High School; Wilson Memorial High School
- Website: https://www.waynesboro.k12.va.us/o/whs

Waynesboro High School is a public high school in Waynesboro, Virginia, United States.

== History and Administration ==
In 1879, the first boys' and girls' high school was built in the city. Originally "Waynesborough High School", it became an all-boys private school just two years later. In 1906, local citizens made an effort to restart public education, and a new Waynesboro High School and elementary school were built. Due to overcrowding at Waynesboro High, a second school was built called Basic City High School. The school was in operation until the merger of Waynesboro and Basic City (this created Woodrow Wilson High School) in 1924.

Construction on the school began in 1936, funded by a Public Works Administration grant. Soon after it was completed in April 1938, there were 370 students and 13 faculty members.

In 1924, Waynesboro also opened the Rosenwald School for African Americans. The school was in operation until the desegregation of Waynesboro Public Schools in 1966. The school then merged with Waynesboro High School.

In the spring of 2015, there was an ongoing debate on the future of the building: to rebuild or renovate. As of 2018, construction began for the renovation and the new additions to Waynesboro High School.

=== Administration ===
Since 2019, Bryan Stamm has served as Waynesboro High School's principal. Before his appointment, he was an assistant principal at the school.

== Academics ==
Waynesboro High School offers several Advanced Placement (AP), Dual Enrollment (DE), Career and Technical Education (CTE), and Performing Arts classes. The school also offers American Sign Language, Latin, French, and Spanish as foreign languages.

== Athletics ==
Waynesboro High School competes in the Shenandoah District of the Virginia High School League (VHSL). The school's mascot is the Little Giants. The mascot is named for the mascot of Lewis Spilman's alma mater, Wabash College. Spilman was a newspaper owner who helped secure funding for Waynesboro High School. Waynesboro's rivals are Staunton High School, Stuarts Draft High School, and Wilson Memorial High School.

=== Sports ===
Waynesboro High School offers the following sports: football, cross country, golf, volleyball, cheerleading, basketball, indoor track, wrestling, swimming, baseball, soccer, tennis, and outdoor track.

Basketball

In 1990 and 1991, the girls' and boys' basketball teams won back-to-back state championships in basketball. In 1990, the girls defeated Martinsville High School, and in 1991, the boys defeated reigning state champions Robert E. Lee High School.

== Notable alumni ==
- Cory Alexander, former professional basketball player
- Ann Bedsole (b. 1930), first woman elected to the Alabama Senate
- Kenny Brooks, Virginia Tech women's head basketball coach
- Austin Edwards, former NFL player
- Reggie Harris, former MLB player (Oakland Athletics, Boston Red Sox, Philadelphia Phillies, Houston Astros, Milwaukee Brewers)
- Ricky Ray, former NFL defensive back
