= Staunton City Schools =

School district in Virginia, United States

Staunton City Public Schools
- 116 W. Beverley Street Stauton, Virginia, 24401

District information
- Type: Public
- Grades: PK–12
- Superintendent: Dr. Eric Irizarry
- Schools: 6
- NCES District ID: 5103690

Students and staff
- Students: 2,692 (2024–25)
- Teachers: 208.00 (on an FTE basis)
- Student–teacher ratio: 12.94

Other information
- Website: www.stauton.k12.va.us

Staunton City Schools is the public school district of Staunton, Virginia. The district operates five schools, as well as one alternative education center. A six-member board of education oversees the school district. Dr. Eric Irizarry serves as the district superintendent.

== Schools ==
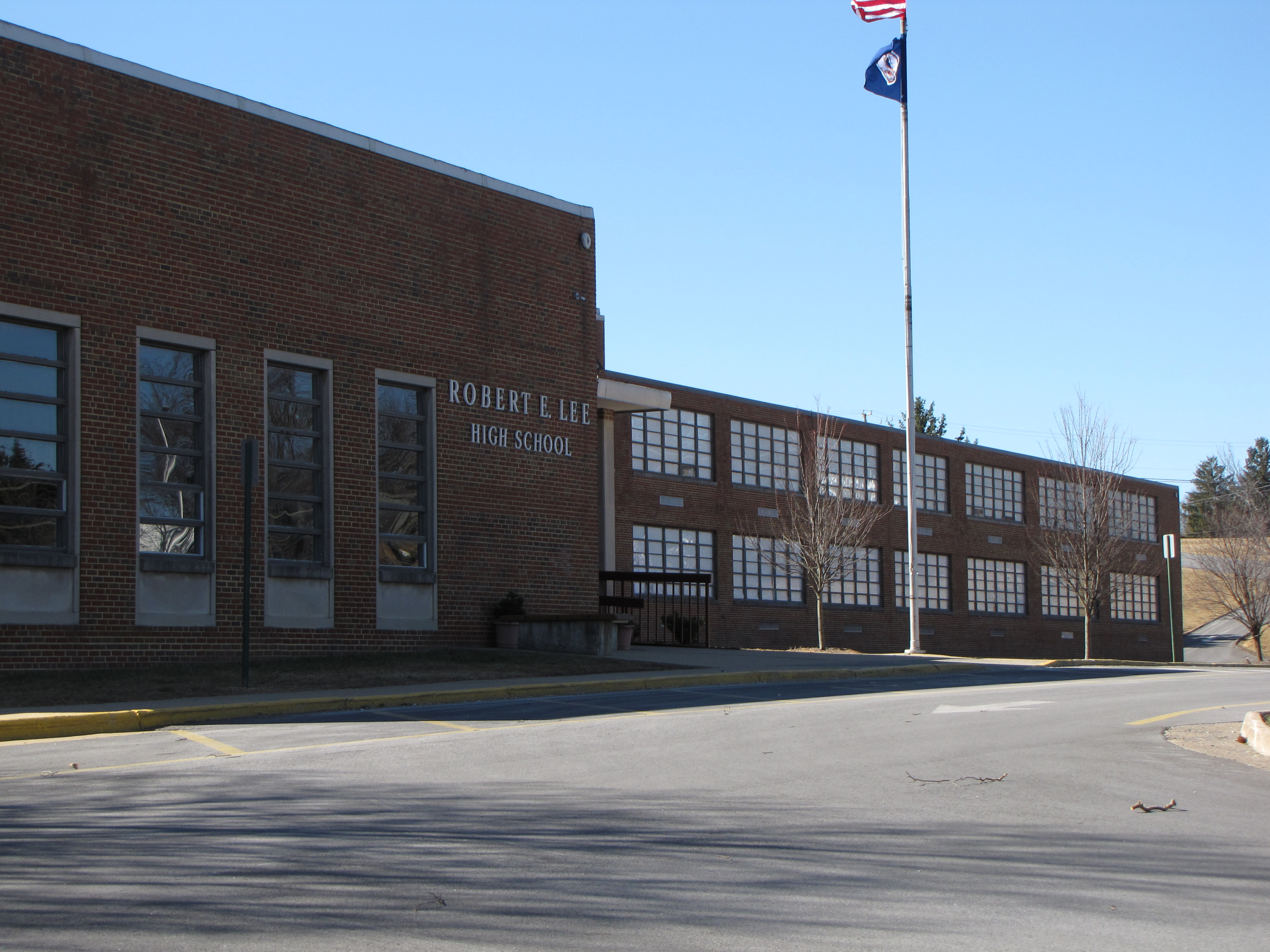
Staunton High School

- T.C. McSwain Elementary School
- A.R. Ware Elementary School
- Bessie Weller Elementary School
- Shelburne Middle School
- Staunton High School / Robert E. Lee High school
- Dixon Educational Center (includes Genesis Alternative Education Program)
