= Riverheads High School =

Coordinates: 38°1′58.1″N 79°8′22.9″W

Location
- 19 Howardsville Rd; Staunton, Virginia 24401

Information
- Type: Public school
- Motto: "Proud past, promising future"
- Established: 1962
- Locale: Rural, Distant
- School district: Augusta County Public Schools
- NCES District ID: 5100300
- NCES School ID: 510030000129
- Principal: Matt Stevens
- Teaching staff: 34.75 (on an FTE basis)
- Grades: 9–12
- Enrollment: 467 (2024–25)
- Student to teacher ratio: 13.44
- Colors: Red, Black & White
- Athletics: Baseball, Basketball, Cheerleading, Cross Country, Football, Golf, Indoor Track, Soccer, Softball, Tennis, Track and Field, Volleyball, Wrestling
- Athletics conference: A Shenandoah District; Region B
- Mascot: Gladiator
- Nickname: Red Pride
- Rivals: Wilson Memorial High School, Stuarts Draft High School, Buffalo Gap High School
- Website: Official site

Riverheads High School is a public school located in Augusta County, Virginia. Riverheads is the home of the Gladiators. Riverheads High School was built in 1962 to accommodate 600 students. Located at Routes 11 and 701, ten miles south of Staunton, it is one of five high schools serving Augusta County. A six-classroom wing was added in 1976 to provide for increased enrollment and additional course offerings. An eight-million dollar program, completed in 1997, provided renovation with improved and expanded instructional, athletic, and support facilities. Riverheads is nestled in a historic area. In the vicinity are the Hessian House, McCormick’s Grist Mill, and Old Providence Church. Nearby three major highways converge: I-81, U.S. 11, and Route 340. Students are transported by buses covering an area which extend eighteen miles at certain points. Forming the school community are areas such as Moffatts Creek, McKinley, Newport, Vesuvius, Mint Spring, Middlebrook, Greenville, Spottswood, Lofton, White Hill, Jollivue, and the southern sections of both the Stuarts Draft area and the Beverley Manor District. Membership in recent times has varied from a high of 729 (with an eighth grade) in 1978–79 to 420 in 1991–92 (with no eighth grade). Many parents are employed in agriculture, industry-labor trade, and services. A majority are high school graduates and about one-fourth have education beyond high school. The student body is stable; About 90 percent of the senior class have been at Riverheads all their high school experience. Academically, the students compare well with other students in the nation on achievement tests, scoring above the norms for the South in SAT scores. Over half of the senior class typically continue their education beyond high school. The school is accredited by the State Board of Education and by the Southern Association of Colleges and Schools. In 2015, Riverheads High School was recognized as a Blue Ribbon School by U.S. Secretary of Education Arne Duncan. Only seven schools in Virginia were awarded this prestigious title in 2015. While the community is a growing industrial area, agriculture remains important to the school community. Varied cultural and recreational opportunities, good medical services, including those for the disabled and mentally or emotionally disturbed, community employment and guidance services, varied transportation and communication services, many churches and service clubs to meet the religious and civic needs, and several educational facilities for advanced or specialized training are all available nearby.

== Athletics ==
The Gladiators have won seventeen total Virginia Division A Championships in five different sports. They have claimed ten State Championship titles in Football (2000) (2006) (2010) (2016) (2017) (2018) (2019) (2020) (2021) (2022) two in Boys' Track & Field (1975) (2009), two in Girls' Tennis (1982) (1984), two in Baseball (2013) (2018) and one in Boys' Soccer (2016).

In 2023 the Gladiators moved up from Class A to Class AA.
