= Andrew Rowsey =

American basketball player (born 1994)

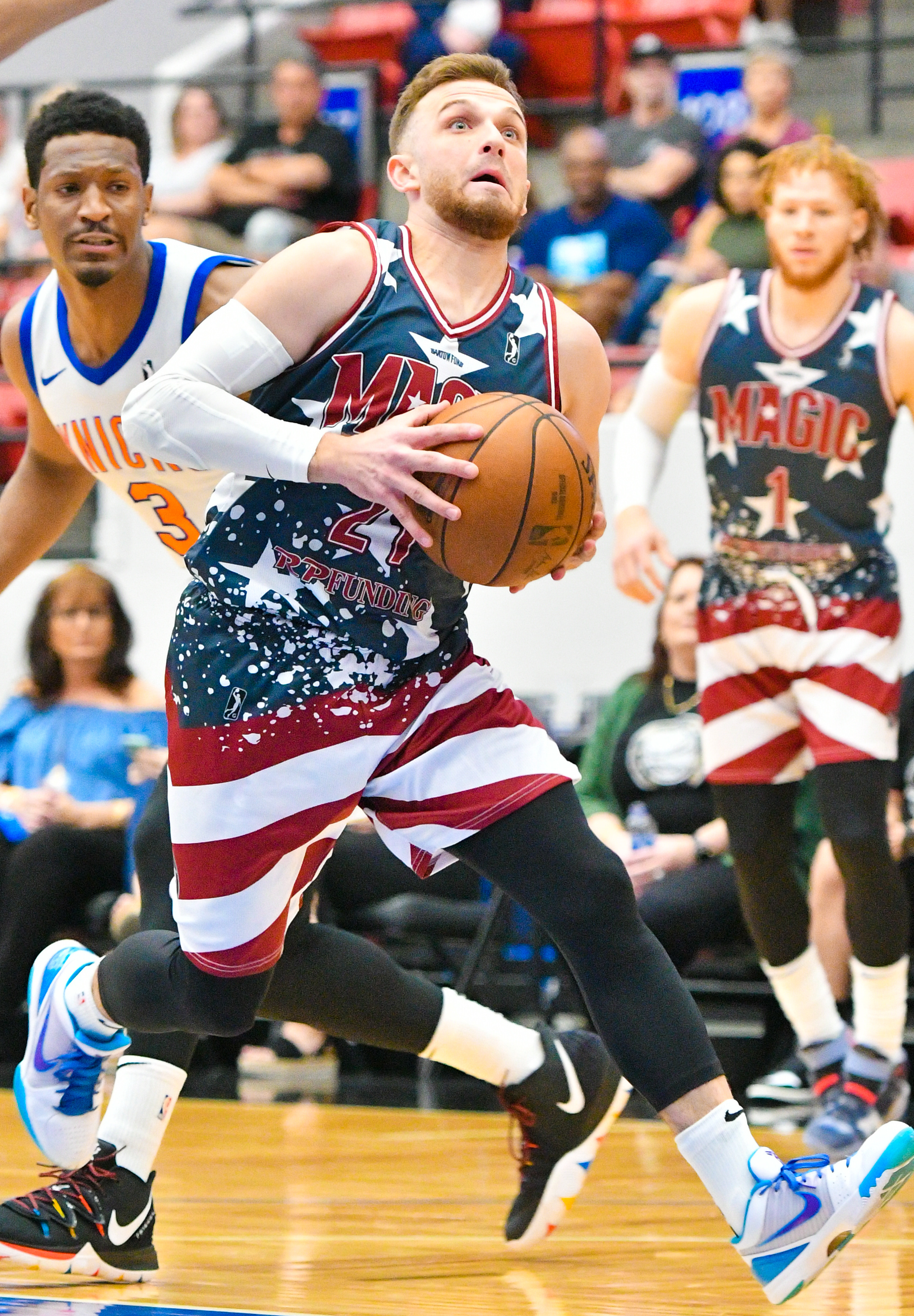
- Rowsey in 2020

Personal information
- Born: June 18, 1994 (age 32) Lexington, Virginia, U.S.
- Listed height: 5 ft 11 in (1.80 m)
- Listed weight: 175 lb (79 kg)

Career information
- High school: Rockbridge County (Lexington, Virginia)
- College: UNC Asheville (2013–2015); Marquette (2016–2018)
- NBA draft: 2018: undrafted
- Playing career: 2018–2022
- Position: Point guard

Career history
- 2018–2019: Szolnoki Olaj
- 2019–2021: Lakeland Magic
- 2021–2022: Raptors 905
- 2022: Fort Wayne Mad Ants

Career highlights
- Big East Sixth Man of the Year (2017); NBA G League champion (2021); Second-team All-Big South (2014); First-team All-Big South (2015)

Andrew Rowsey (born June 18, 1994) is an American former professional basketball player. He played college basketball for the UNC Asheville Bulldogs and the Marquette Golden Eagles.

== Early life ==
Rowsey was born on June 18, 1994, in Lexington, Virginia. He attended Rockbridge County High School, and was named the Timesland player of the year following his junior and senior seasons. He finished as the second highest scorer in Virginia high school history behind Allen Iverson. Despite this, he was lightly recruited, choosing UNC Asheville over offers from Richmond and High Point.

== College career ==
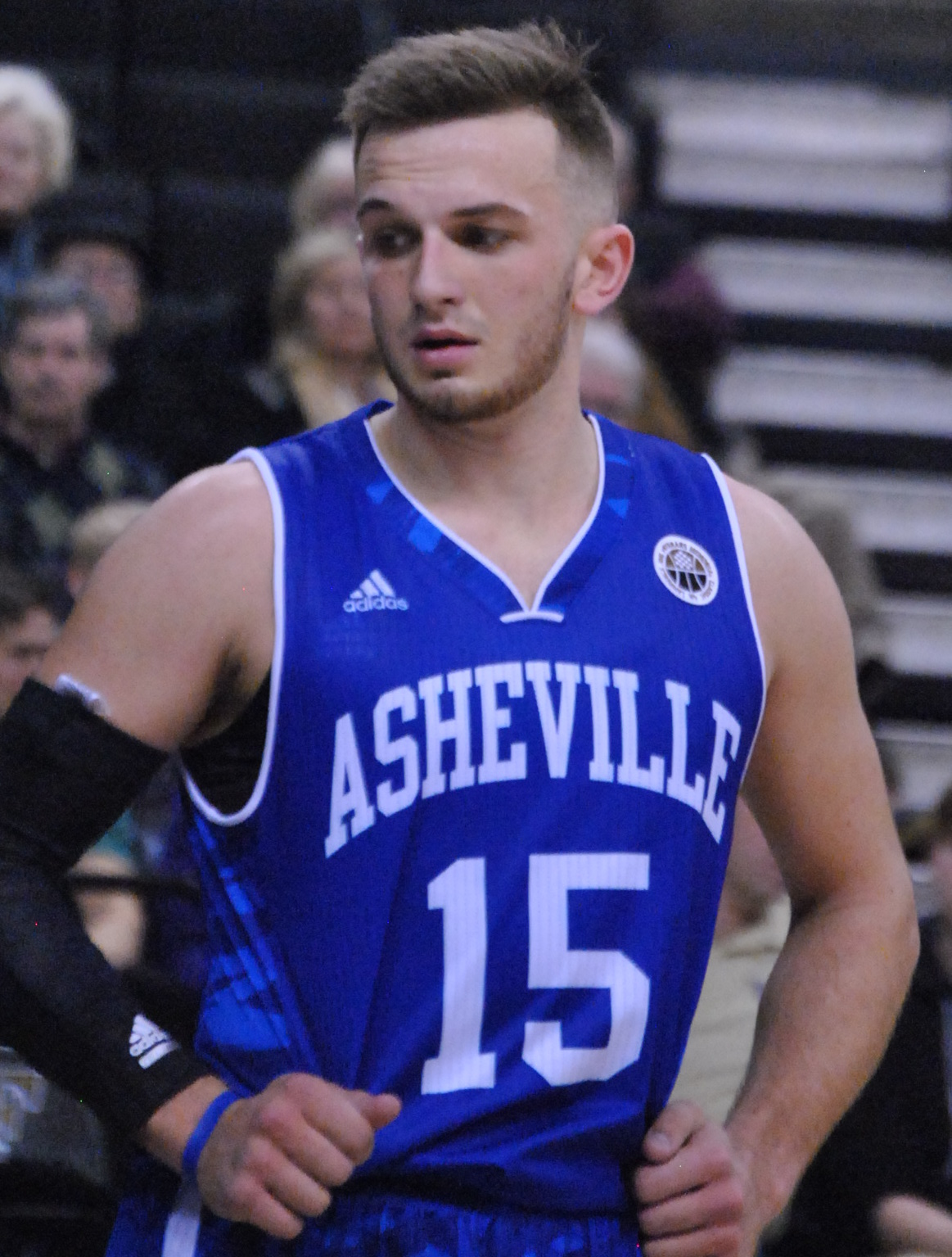
Rowsey with UNC Asheville in 2014

As a freshman at UNC Asheville, Rowsey averaged 20.3 points per game, second among freshman in Division I. He was named to the First-team All-Big South, Big South Freshman of the Year, and helped the team to a 17–15 record. He was named to the Second-team All-Conference as a sophomore, averaging 19.2 points per game. After the season, he decided to transfer to Marquette. As a redshirt junior at Marquette, he averaged 11.5 points per game and helped Marquette reach the NCAA tournament as a 10 seed. He was named the Big East Sixth Man of the Year. Rowsey scored his 2,000th point in a 70–52 victory over DePaul on January 15 and finished with 11 points. As a senior, Rowsey led Marquette to a 21–14 record and the NIT quarterfinals. He scored 29 points and tied a season-high six three-pointers in the season-ending loss to Penn State, and broke Dwyane Wade's single-season Marquette scoring record with 716 points. He also set the single-season three-pointers made mark with 125 threes. He averaged 20.5 points, 4.8 assists, and 3.0 rebounds per game in 35 games. Rowsey scored 15.0 points and posted 7.0 assists per game in the Portsmouth Invitational Tournament after the season and led his team to the championship game.

== Professional career ==
=== Szolnoki Olaj (2018–2019) ===
Rowsey was signed by the Toronto Raptors in the 2018 NBA Summer League. On July 28, 2018, Rowsey signed with Szolnoki Olaj of the Hungarian league. He averaged 11.1 points, 2.4 rebounds and 2.3 assists over 21.9 minutes per game for Szolnoki Olaj in the 2018–19 season.

=== Lakeland Magic (2019–2021) ===
On December 16, 2019, the Lakeland Magic of the NBA G League acquired Rowsey from the available player pool. On January 15, 2020, Rowsey tallied a season-high 29 points, three rebounds, two steals and an assist in a loss to the Delaware Blue Coats. On February 1, 2020, Rowsey scored a career high 43 points with seven made 3-pointers on 81% shooting in a 130–121 win against the Capital City Go-Go. Rowsey averaged 19.3 points per game and led the G League in 3-point field-goal percentage (47%).

On October 2, 2020, Rowsey signed with the Gießen 46ers of the Basketball Bundesliga as a replacement for Jonathan Stark. However, he never appeared in a game for the team. He rejoined the Lakeland Magic for the 2021 G League restart.

=== Raptors 905 (2021–2022) ===
At the beginning of the 2021–22 season, Rowsey signed with Turkish club Samsunspor. On August 30, 2021, his contract has been terminated by the club. Rowsey was acquired by the Raptors 905 to start the 2021 season. He was later waived on January 10, 2022.

=== Fort Wayne Mad Ants (2022) ===
On January 11, 2022, after Rowsey cleared waivers, he was acquired by the Fort Wayne Mad Ants.
