= Alleghany County Public Schools =

School district in Virginia, United States

Alleghany Highlands Public Schools

Address
- 100 Central Circle Low Moor, Virginia, 24457; United States

District information
- Type: Public
- Superintendent: Kim K. Halterman
- School board: Jon Lanford (Chairman); Jerry (Jay) Woodson (Vice Chairman); Jonathan Arritt; Danielle I. Morgan; Robert Umstead; John Littleton; Nicole Clemons
- Schools: 7
- NCES District ID: 5100152

Students and staff
- Enrollment: 2,804 (2024–25)
- Teachers: 218.00 (on an FTE basis)
- Staff: 248
- Student–teacher ratio: 12.86
- Athletic conference: Blue Ridge District; Region III

Other information
- Website: www.ahps.k12.va.us

Alleghany Highlands Public Schools is a public school system which serves Alleghany County and the independent city of Covington in the lower Shenandoah Valley of Virginia. It was created on July 1, 2023, when Alleghany County and Covington City merged their two school systems due to declining attendance.

The system consists of approximately 2,700 students across six schools, of which there are four elementary schools, one middle school, and one high school.

== Schools ==
=== Secondary schools ===
- Alleghany High School, Covington
- Covington Middle School, Covington
- Clifton Academy, Covington

=== Elementary schools ===
All elementary schools hold students in grades K-5.

- Callaghan Elementary School, Covington
- Jeter-Watson Elementary School, Covington
- Mountain View Elementary School, Covington
- Sharon Elementary School, Clifton Forge

=== Former schools ===
Two elementary schools, one middle school, and two high schools have been closed or consolidated due to declining enrollment.

- Alleghany County High School, Low Moor
- Boiling Spring Elementary School, Covington
- Clifton Forge High School, Clifton Forge
- Clifton Middle School, Clifton Forge
- Covington High School, Covington
- Falling Spring Elementary School, Hot Springs
