= Rockbridge County High School =

Location
- 143 Greenhouse Road; Lexington, Virginia 24450; United States; 37°48′7″N 79°25′21.2″W

Information
- Type: Public secondary school
- Motto: Together, We Are Rockbridge!
- Established: 1992
- Locale: Town, Distant
- School district: Rockbridge County Public Schools
- NCES District ID: 5103370
- NCES School ID: 510337000204
- Principal: Shaun Sparks
- Teaching staff: 76.00 (on an FTE basis)
- Grades: 9–12
- Enrollment: 916 (2024–25)
- Student to teacher ratio: 12.05
- Colors: Blue, Silver & White
- Athletics: Baseball, Basketball, Cheerleading, Cross Country, Football, Golf, Indoor Track, Soccer, Softball, Tennis, Track and Field, Volleyball, Wrestling, Swimming, Lacrosse
- Athletics conference: Shenandoah District
- Nickname: Wildcats
- Website: rchs.rockbridge.k12.va.us

Rockbridge County High School is a secondary school in Lexington, Virginia.

== History ==
Rockbridge County High School was built in 1992 to include all students in Rockbridge County and Lexington, Virginia in grades 9–12. This school consolidated the former Rockbridge High School, Lexington High School, and Natural Bridge High School. It is operated by Rockbridge County Public Schools. The school's mascot is the Wildcat.

== Demographics ==
The demographic breakdown of the 967 students enrolled for the 2017–2018 school year was:

- Male – 52.8%
- Female – 47.2%
- Native American/Alaskan – 0.4%
- Asian/Pacific islander – 1.3%
- Black – 4.9%
- Hispanic – 2.9%
- White – 87.8%
- Multiracial – 2.7%

In addition, 30.3% of the students were eligible for free or reduced lunch.

== Sports ==
Rockbridge County High School currently supports 13 Varsity teams including Marching Band, Cheerleading (football and competition), Wrestling, Football, Volleyball, indoor/outdoor Boys' and Girls' track and field, Girls' and Boys' Basketball, Girls' and Boys' Lacrosse, Golf, Swimming, Baseball, Softball, Girls' and Boys' Soccer, Girls' and Boys' Tennis and 8 Junior Varsity teams including Cheerleading, Football, Volleyball, Baseball, Girls' and Boys' Soccer, Softball, Girls' and Boys' Basketball as well as an Academic Team.

== Notable alumni ==
- Brent Pry, Virginia Tech Hokies head football coach
- Ben Cline, United States representative
- Kelly Evans, CNBC news anchor
- Andrew Rowsey, professional basketball player
