= Staunton High School =

Public high school in Virginia, US

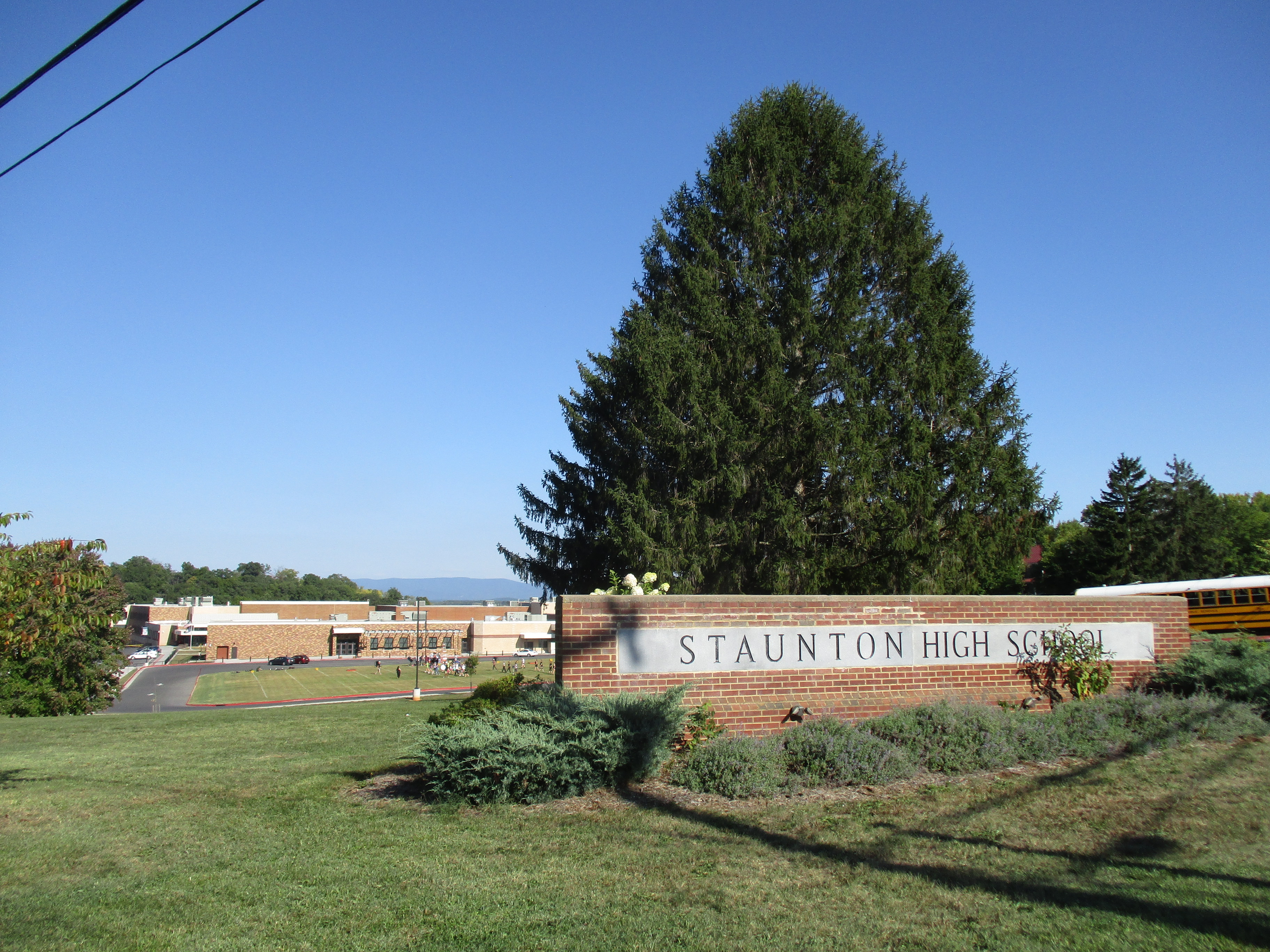
- Staunton High School

Location
- 1200 North Coalter St. Staunton, Virginia 24401; United States; 38°9′53.6″N 79°3′11.5″W

Information
- Funding type: Public school
- Motto: "Fate whispered to the warrior, 'you cannot withstand the storm.' The warrior replied, 'I am the storm.'"
- Locale: City, Small
- School district: Staunton City Public Schools
- NCES District ID: 5103690
- NCES School ID: 510369001606
- Principal: Tammy Lightner
- Teaching staff: 58.00 (on an FTE basis)
- Grades: 9–12
- Enrollment: 766 (2024–25)
- Student to teacher ratio: 13.21
- Language: English (Language Classes include Spanish, French, Latin, and American Sign Language)
- Colors: Blue and silver
- Athletics conference: Shenandoah District
- Mascot: Storm
- Rivals: Waynesboro High School, Fort Defiance High School
- Newspaper: The News Flash
- Website: shs.staunton.k12.va.us
- Staunton High School
- U.S. National Register of Historic Places
- Virginia Landmarks Register
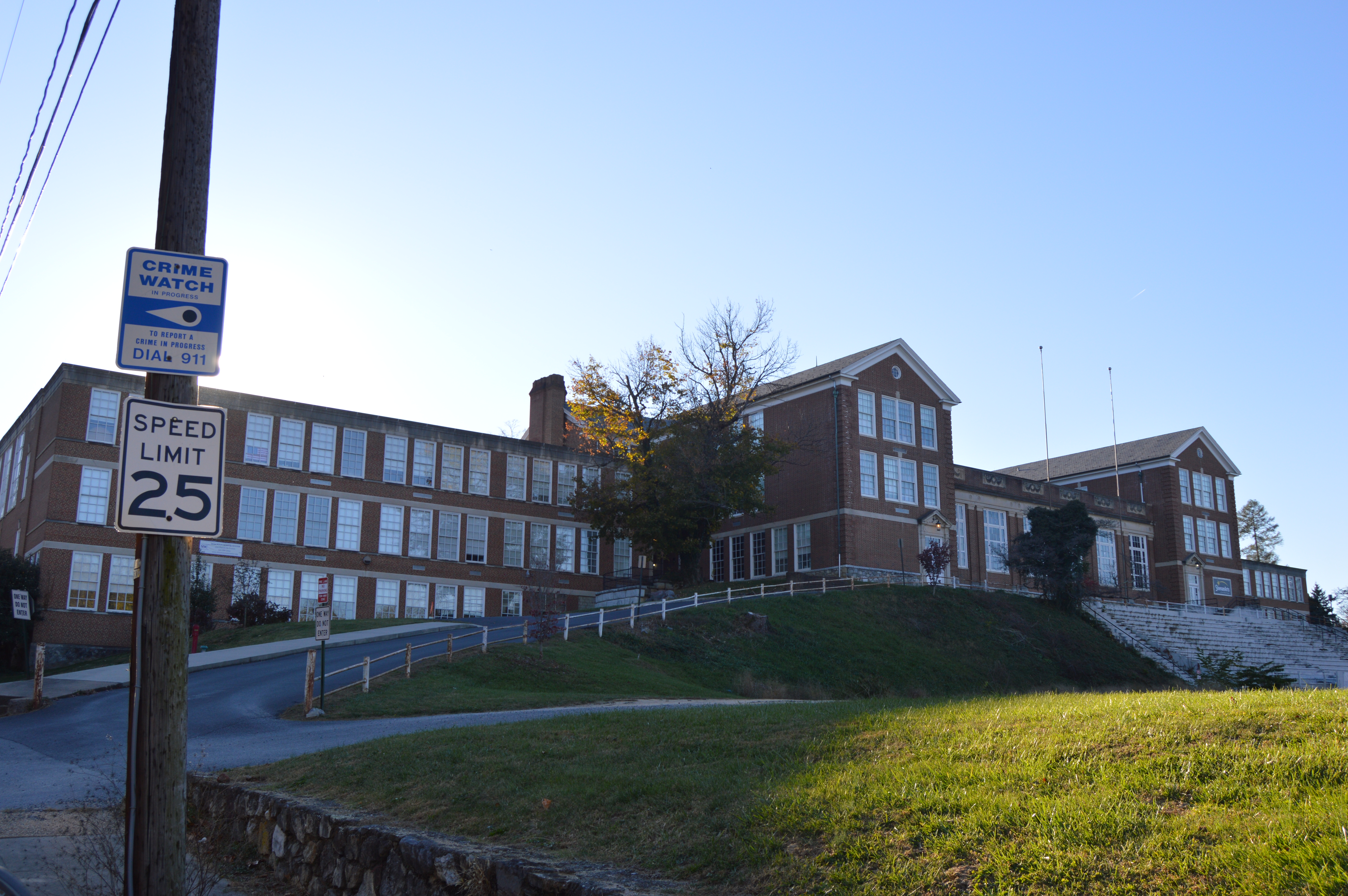
- Original complex

- Location within Virginia Location within the United States
- Location: 274 Churchville Ave., Staunton, Virginia
- Coordinates: 38°9′53.6″N 79°3′11.5″W
- Area: 5.3 acres (2.1 ha)
- Built: 1926
- Architect: T.J. Collins & Son
- Architectural style: Colonial Revival
- NRHP reference No.: 09000122
- VLR No.: 132-0037

Significant dates
- Added to NRHP: March 10, 2009
- Designated VLR: December 18, 2008

Staunton High School is a public high school in Staunton, Virginia, United States. It is a part of Staunton City Schools, a public school district that also includes three elementary schools, a middle school, and an alternative education program.

== History ==
Staunton High School was originally opened in the early 1900s and renamed Robert E. Lee High School in 1914 during the monthly school board meeting held on April 30, 1914 at the urging of the United Daughters of the Confederacy.

In 1983, the school moved to what had been John Lewis Junior High School, on North Coalter Street. The original building subsequently housed a summer ESL school and a parochial school operated by the Roman Catholic Diocese of Richmond, and was later renovated into senior apartments. It was added to the National Register of Historic Places in 2009.

In July 2014 The News Leader received a letter to the editor that suggested renaming Robert E. Lee High School; The majority of the newspaper's editorial board and key employees agreed and suggested possible names. In August 2017, in the wake of the Unite the Right rally in Charlottesville, Virginia, the editorial board stated that it may be "tougher" to keep the school named after Lee. In October 2018, after months of debate, as well as "focus groups and community listening sessions" conducted by the Virginia Center For Inclusive Communities, the Staunton School Board voted 4–2 in favor of renaming the school. The next month, following a public survey with over 4,000 submissions, it was decided the school would return to its original name, Staunton High School. The change took effect on July 1, 2019.

== Notable alumni ==
- Francis Collins – geneticist with the Human Genome Project
- John C. Reed – cell biologist with Roche Pharmaceuticals
- Larry Sheets – former MLB player (Baltimore Orioles, Detroit Tigers, Seattle Mariners)
- Frederick Swann – composer and concert organist
- Tyler Zombro – Vice President of Pitching for the Chicago Cubs
