= Briery Church =

Historic church in Virginia, United States

- U.S. National Register of Historic Places
- Virginia Landmarks Register
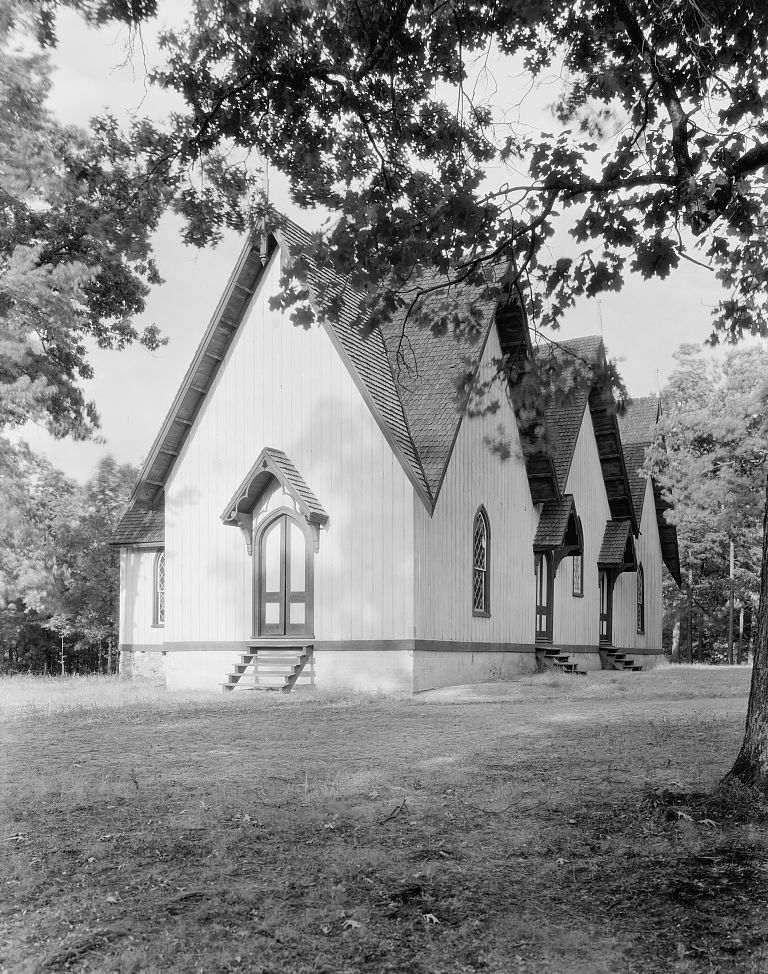
- Briery Church, 1930s

- Location within Virginia Location within the United States
- Location: North of the junction of VA 747 and VA 671, Briery, Virginia
- Coordinates: 37°5′23″N 78°28′44″W
- Area: 8.8 acres (3.6 ha)
- Built: 1855
- Architect: Dabney, Rev. Robert Lewis
- Architectural style: Gothic Revival
- NRHP reference No.: 69000371
- VLR No.: 073-0038

Significant dates
- Added to NRHP: November 29, 1969
- Designated VLR: May 13, 1969

Briery Church is a historic Presbyterian Church located at Briery, Prince Edward County, Virginia. While the congregation dates as far back as 1755, the present building was designed by Rev. Robert Lewis Dabney (1820–1898) and built about 1855. It is a one-story, board-and-batten covered frame structure with a T-shaped plan. It has a steep gable roof with overhanging eaves, three cross gables, and lancet window openings in the Gothic Revival style.

It was listed on the National Register of Historic Places in 1969.

The first house of worship was built about 1760. Among the early church leaders were Samuel Stanhope Smith, Drury Lacy, and John Blair Smith, each of whom served as president of Hampden-Sydney College. Samuel S. Smith also served as president of Princeton University (then known as College of New Jersey) and John B. Smith also served as first president of Union College in New York. In 1766, funds were raised as part of a plan to 'support the gospel' which enabled the purchase of slaves that were then rented out.

The church remains an active congregation. It belongs to the Presbytery of the Peaks within the Presbyterian Church (USA).
