= New Providence Presbyterian Church (Brownsburg, Virginia) =

Historic church in Virginia, United States

- U.S. National Register of Historic Places
- Virginia Landmarks Register
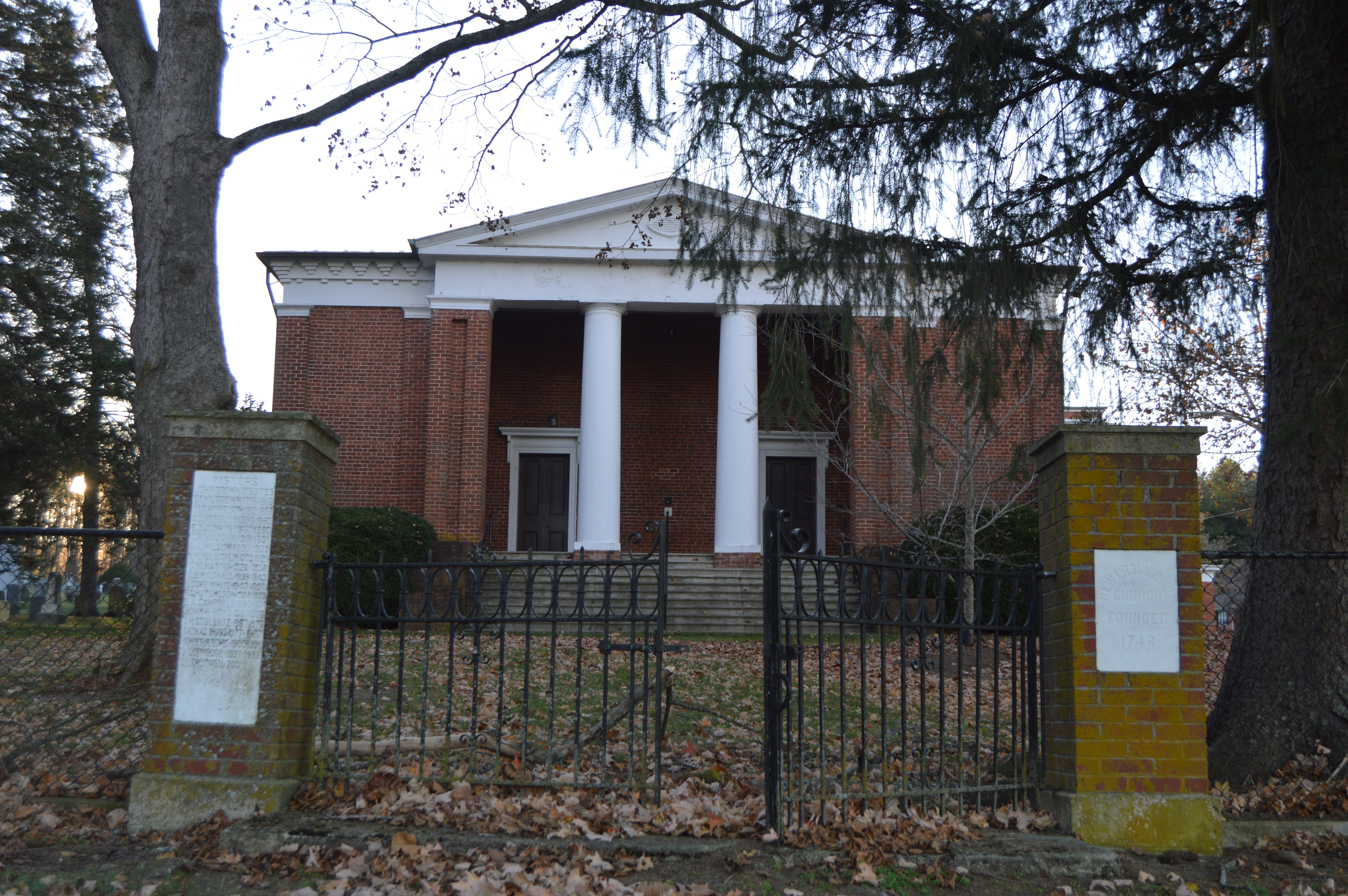
- Front of the church

- Location within Virginia Location within the United States
- Location: Northeast of Brownsburg, Virginia
- Coordinates: 37°57′6.5″N 79°18′8″W
- Area: 2 acres (0.81 ha)
- Built: 1859
- Architect: Robert Lewis Dabney
- Architectural style: Greek Revival
- NRHP reference No.: 80004223
- VLR No.: 081-0046

Significant dates
- Added to NRHP: March 26, 1980
- Designated VLR: February 21, 1978

New Providence Presbyterian Church is a historic Presbyterian church located at Brownsburg, Rockbridge County, Virginia. It was built in 1859, and is a monumental, one-story Greek Revival style brick building. Rev. Robert Lewis Dabney (1820-1898) may have had a hand in the design of New Providence. The front facade features a central recessed portico marked by slightly projecting flanking piers and a similarly projecting pediment supported on two massive, unfluted Doric order columns. In 1926 a three-story, brick Sunday School wing was added to the rear.

It was listed on the National Register of Historic Places in 1980.
