= Fort Defiance, Virginia =

Unincorporated community in Virginia, United States

Fort Defiance
- Census-designated place
- Location within the state of Virginia
- Coordinates: 38°14′25″N 078°58′19″W
- Country: United States
- State: Virginia
- County: Augusta County
- Established: 1740
- Elevation: 1,286 ft (392 m)

Population (2002)
  - Total: 780
- Time zone: UTC-5 (EST)
  - Summer (DST): UTC-4 (EDT)
- ZIP code: 24437
- Area code: 540

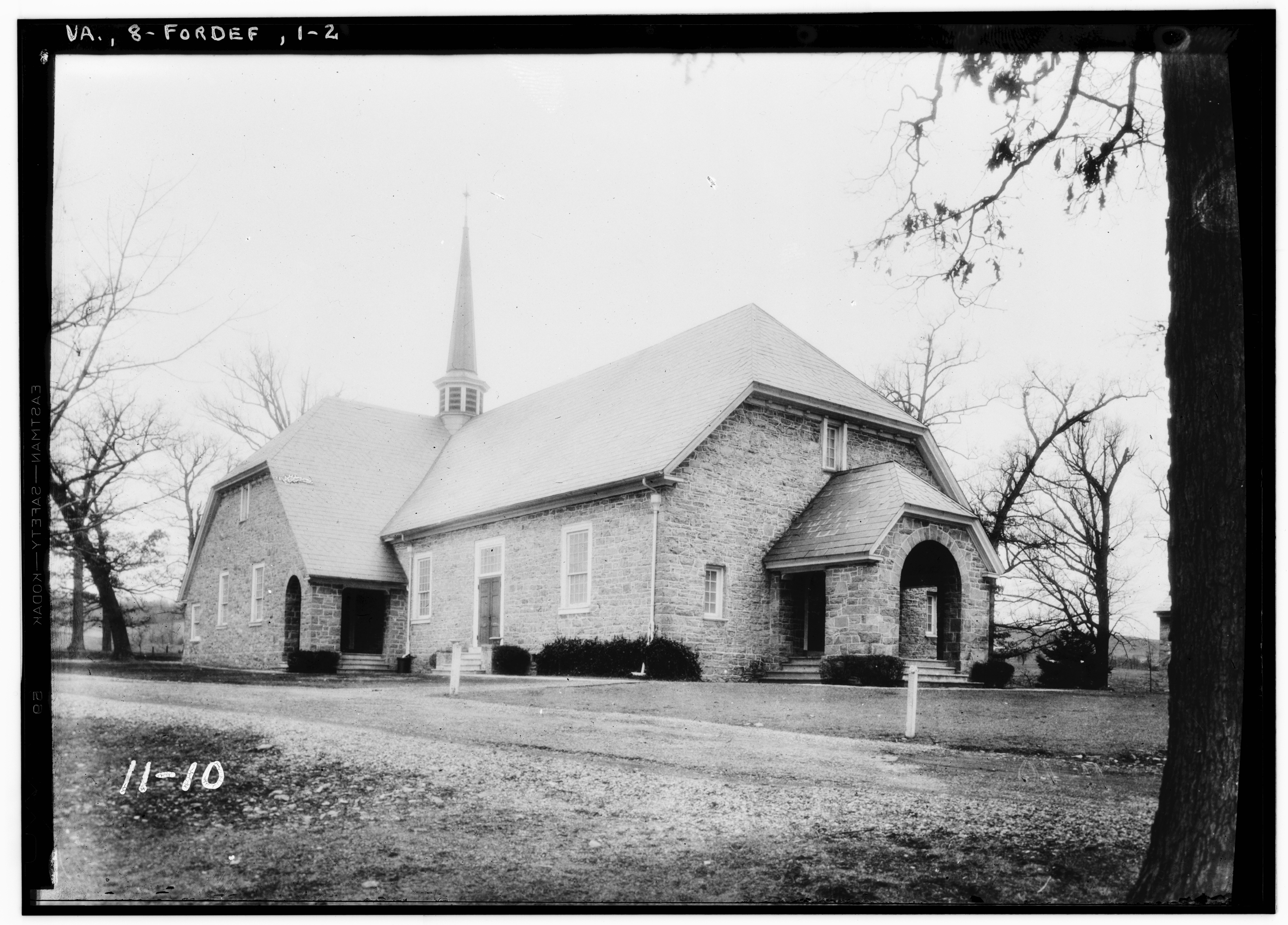
1933 photo of the Old Stone Church from the Historic American Buildings Survey.

Fort Defiance is an unincorporated community in Augusta County, Virginia, United States. It is part of the Staunton–Waynesboro Micropolitan Statistical Area.

== History ==
Augusta Stone Church was established in the area now known as Fort Defiance in 1740. Local legend claims the church was used as a haven during the French and Indian War, when Augusta County was the western frontier of the country. The original church building was made of logs and, along with the historic cemetery, was located east of present-day U.S. Route 11 and to the rear of the stone church. Following the defeat of General Edward Braddock at the Battle of the Monongahela on 9 July 1755, parishioners fortified the Old Stone Presbyterian Church and named the fortification Fort Defiance. The name Fort Defiance was not applied to the community until the late 19th century.

== Sites of interest ==
- Augusta Military Academy, a now-defunct military academy that was one of the first in the nation to adopt the JROTC program and site of historical marker VA-A100 Augusta Military Academy;
- Augusta Stone Church, the oldest Presbyterian Church in continuous use in Virginia;
- Historical Marker VA-A99 Willow Spout, a willow tree planted in the mid-19th century over a spring so that water was driven out a spout driven in the tree's side into a wooden trough.

== Education ==
Fort Defiance is served by Augusta County Public Schools. Clymore Elementary School, Stewart Middle School and Fort Defiance High School are within the unincorporated area's boundaries.
