= Stuarts Draft High School =

Public high school in Virginia, US

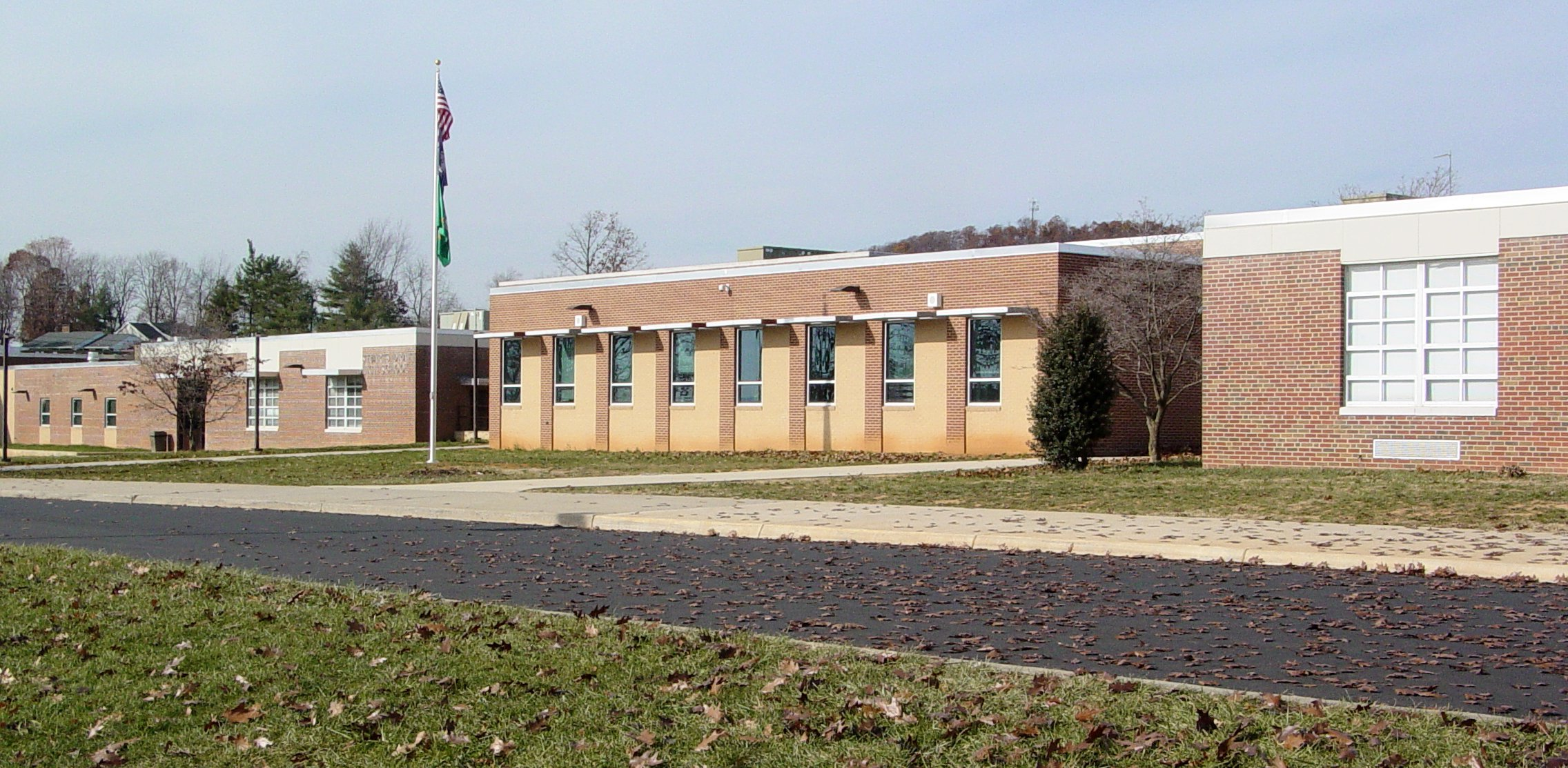
- Stuarts Draft High School following the completion of renovations in 2007

Location
- 1028 Augusta Farms Road; Stuarts Draft, Virginia 24477; United States; 38°2′48″N 79°0′46″W

Information
- School type: Public, high school
- Established: 1970; 56 years ago
- Locale: Rural, Fringe
- School district: Augusta County Public Schools
- NCES District ID: 5100300
- Superintendent: Dr. Kelly F. Troxell
- NCES School ID: 510030000132
- Principal: Tony Ramsey
- Teaching staff: 46.50 (on an FTE basis)
- Grades: 9–12
- Enrollment: 668 (2024–25)
- Student to teacher ratio: 14.37
- Language: English
- Colors: Maroon, White and Light Gray
- Athletics: Football, Baseball, Softball, Soccer, Basketball, Volleyball, Wrestling, Golf, Cross Country, Track and field, Tennis, Marching band and Cheerleading
- Athletics conference: A Shenandoah District; Region B 2A East Conference 36
- Mascot: Cougar
- Rivals: Wilson Memorial High School, Waynesboro High School and Riverheads High School
- Website: www.augusta.k12.va.us/stuartsdrafths

Stuarts Draft High School is in the community of Stuarts Draft in southeastern Augusta County, Virginia. The school opened in 1970 during a consolidation period for the county's public schools. Stuarts Draft High School originally served grades 8 through 12, and housed the 7th grade due to overcrowding at Stuarts Draft Elementary School (now Guy K. Stump Elementary School). Today, Stuart Draft High School serves 668 students in grades 9–12.

A middle and elementary school have been built in proximity to Stuarts Draft High School, creating one of two school complexes in the county. Four percent of the student body is African American, six percent is multiracial, one percent is Native American, two percent is Asian, and eight percent is Hispanic. Eleven percent of the students receive special education services. Stuarts Draft High School performs respectably on standardized tests. The school maintains an 87% pass rate on SOL end-of-course tests; the mean SAT verbal and math score is 509 and 523 respectively. Sixty-three percent of Stuarts Draft seniors attend college; of that number, 35% go to four-year institutions.
