= Alleghany High School (Virginia) =

Location
- 210 Mountaineer Drive; Covington, Virginia 24426; United States
- 37°47′19.2″N 79°54′32.6″W

Information
- Former name: Alleghany County High School
- School type: Public, high school
- Established: 2023 (merged with Covington High School)
- Locale: Rural, Fringe
- School district: Alleghany County Public Schools
- NCES District ID: 5100152
- NCES School ID: 510015201883
- Principal: Derek Cantrell
- Teaching staff: 60.00 (on an FTE basis)
- Grades: 9–12
- Enrollment: 818 (2024–25)
- Student to teacher ratio: 13.63
- Language: English
- Colors: Navy, Columbia Blue, White
- Athletics conference: VHSL Region 3C; Shenandoah District
- Nickname: Cougars
- Website: ahs.ahps.k12.va.us

Alleghany High School is a public secondary school in Alleghany County, VA, United States. It is part of Alleghany Highlands Public Schools and is located at 210 Mountaineer Drive. Though the school has a Covington mailing address, it is actually about four miles east of Covington City, about two miles west of Low Moor, and roughly 9 miles from Clifton Forge. Since 2023, it has served residents of both Alleghany County and the independent city of Covington.

== History ==
Alleghany High School's current building opened in 1963 as Alleghany County High School. The school's colors were red, white, and Columbia blue, and the mascot was known as the Colt.

In 1983, Clifton Forge High School, located in nearby Clifton Forge closed down, and students from there were consolidated with ACHS forming the current Alleghany High School. Also as a result of the consolidation, Alleghany's mascot changed to the Mountaineer, as this was the mascot of the former Clifton Forge High School. The school's colors remained the same.

In 1985, the school building was severely flooded, with multiple feet of water pooling in some areas. The damage was immense but the building was renovated later that year. The school has not flooded as badly since then, though water has formed puddles in certain areas more recently.

In 2005, the Alleghany County School Board began holding meetings with the public and also started negotiations with contractors about the possibility of building a new Alleghany High School building. The current high school is located on top of a floodplain which has narrowly escaped flooding in recent years, and current resources at Alleghany are strained.

In late 2020, it was announced that Alleghany County Public Schools and Covington City Public Schools would merge. The new school system is known as Alleghany Highlands Public Schools. On July 1, 2023, Covington High School merged with Alleghany to create a new Alleghany High School that took on Covington's Cougar nickname.

== Demographics ==
During the 2014–15 school year, Alleghany High School's student body contained 10.2% minority students. This follows a generally increasing trend of minorities from the 2004 rate of 7.8%.

== Academics ==
Alleghany High School offers a variety of classes in all the main four core subject areas of English, Math, Science and Social Studies. Each subject includes different levels (B, A, Honors, AP, and DE), depending on grade level and class. The credit requirements for a standard diploma are 22 standard credits and 6 verified credits. Advanced diploma credit requirements are 26 or more standard credits and 9 verified credits. Foreign Language class credits are not required for a standard diploma.

Alleghany High School also offers classes through the Jackson River Technical Center, Jackson River Governor's School, and Mountain Gateway Community College.

The school is accredited by the Virginia Department of Education (VDOE) in the Standards of Learning tests in Virginia in English, History, and Science. However, the school is accredited with warning in Math due to scores below the VDOE standards. The average SAT scores for the high school often hover in the upper-400s and lower-500s.

== Athletics ==
The athletic teams are nicknamed the Cougars and currently compete in VHSL Region 3C and the Shenandoah District. The football team plays its home games at Casey Field & Boodie Albert Stadium in downtown Covington.

== Notable alumni ==
- Dana Brunetti (1991), media executive and film producer
- Noah Ricardo Green, perpetrator of the April 2021 United States Capitol car attack
