= Briery, Virginia =

Unincorporated community in Virginia, United States

Briery
- Unincorporated community
- Location within the Commonwealth of Virginia Briery (the United States)
- Coordinates: 37°05′30″N 78°27′28″W
- Country: United States
- State: Virginia
- County: Prince Edward
- Time zone: UTC−5 (Eastern (EST))
  - Summer (DST): UTC−4 (EDT)

Briery is an unincorporated community in Prince Edward County, Virginia, United States.

The Briery Church was listed on the National Register of Historic Places in 1969.
