= Buffalo Gap High School =

Public high school in Virginia, US

Coordinates: 38°11′39.1″N 79°13′4.8″W

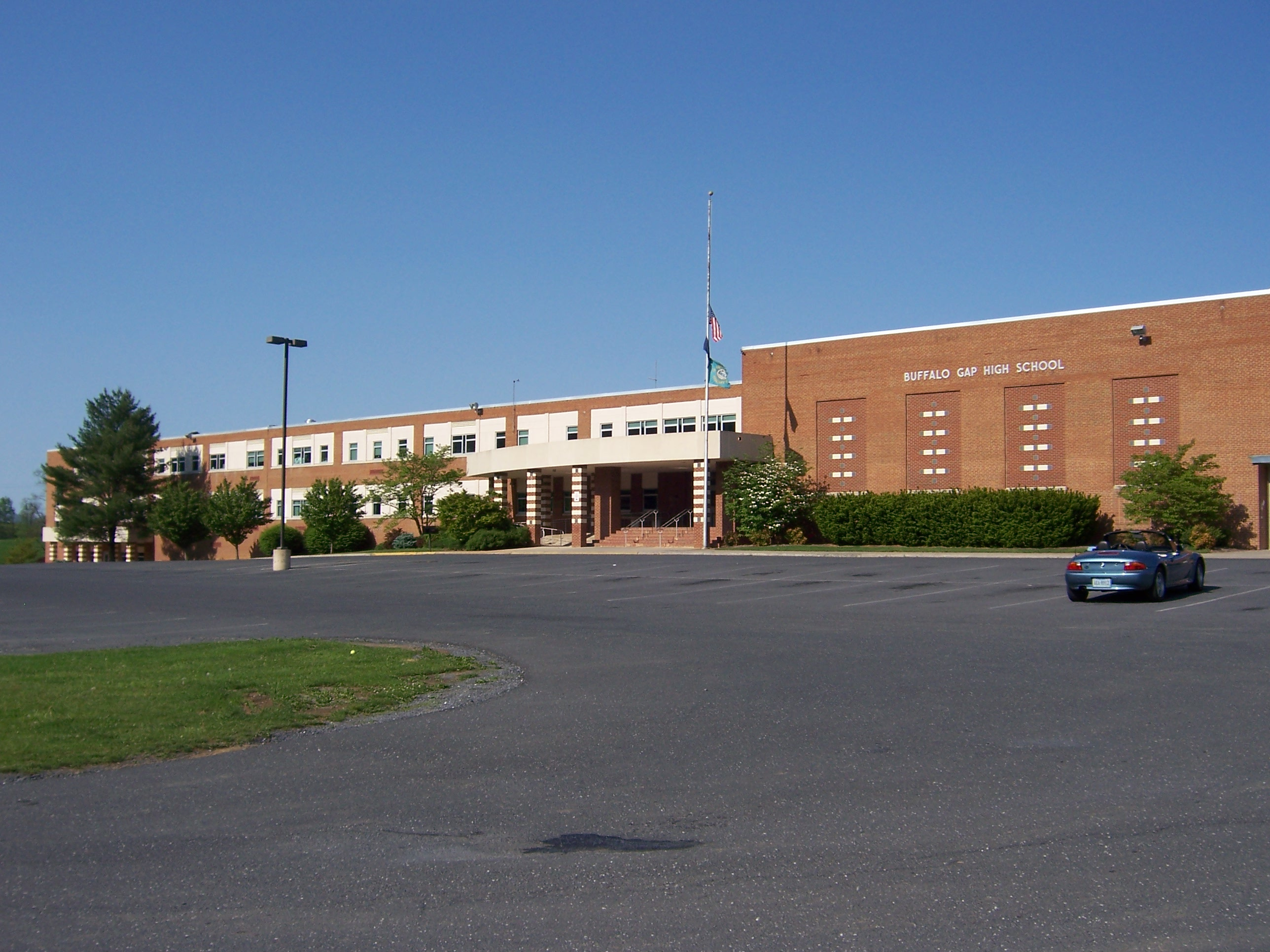

Location
- 1800 Buffalo Gap Highway; Swoope, Virginia 24479; United States

Information
- School type: Public, high school
- Established: 1962
- Locale: Rural, Distant
- School district: Augusta County Public Schools
- NCES District ID: 5100300
- Superintendent: Kelly F. Troxell
- NCES School ID: 510030000117
- Principal: Jesse Ault
- Teaching staff: 32.25 (on an FTE basis)
- Grades: 9–12
- Enrollment: 410 (2024-2025)
- Student to teacher ratio: 12.71
- Language: English
- Colors: Black, Old Gold & White
- Athletics: Baseball, Basketball, Cheerleading, Cross Country, Football, Golf, Indoor Track, Soccer, Softball, Tennis, Track and Field, Volleyball, Wrestling
- Athletics conference: Shenandoah District, Region 1B, Class 1A
- Mascot: Bison
- Website: Official site

Buffalo Gap High School (BGHS) is a public school located in Swoope, Virginia. The Buffalo Gap class of 2007 scored higher in all SAT categories than every public school in Augusta County and inlying cities. The school draws its name from the nearby Buffalo Gap.

As of 2026, the current principal is Jesse Ault.

Before the 2014–2015 school year, Dr. Ian Marshall replaced William Deardorff as the principal of BGHS. Deardorff had been the principal for over 20 years.

== Athletics ==
Despite winning district championships in every major high school sport, Buffalo Gap's primary source of local and state-wide commendation has been for its running programs. The girls' track team has won the 2004, 2005, 2006, and 2007 Single A Virginia High School League State Championship Track Meet. The boys' cross country team has placed second in the VHSL State Championship Race (2000) and has won the State Cross Country Meet twice. Today, the track team maintains a consistently strong performance, particularly in the boys' 4x8 and 4x4 events, often qualifying for state competitions. These teams also consistently place well in the Shenandoah District and Region 1B. The girls' team has also continued to make appearances at the state level.

In 2007, the varsity football team completed a perfect 14-0 season, winning the school's first state championship in football.

The girls' basketball team won the state championship in 1984 and were runners-up in 1983.

In March 2008 and 2009, the Varsity Girls' Basketball team won back-to-back Group A Division 1 State Championships.

The girls' basketball team also made state runs multiple years in a row from the 2020–2021 season through the 2023–2024 season. In 2021, the girls' basketball team finished as Class 1A state runners-up, and in 2024, they were Shenandoah District champions and region 1B champions.

Overall, the girls’ basketball program recognizes Kelly Hoover as their most accomplished athlete. She was part of the 1984 state championship team and scored over 2,000 points, making her the highest scoring basketball player in both the girls' and boys' basketball programs. Kelly went on to play collegiate basketball at Virginia Commonwealth University (VCU), where she held the Rams' career shooting record for 23 years. She is in the VCU Hall of Fame, and her jersey is retired and hangs in the Siegel Center today.

Buffalo Gap also has a strong softball program and has made consistent state appearances. They are in the top 100 teams in the state of Virginia. Multiple players from the program have furthered their career playing college softball as well. One of the most notable players is Kate Alger, who now plays at Christopher Newport University. During her time at Buffalo Gap, Alger was a standout performer on the softball team, earning first-team All-District and All-Region honors and being named Player of the Year during her senior season. She also received second-team All-District honors as a freshman and sophomore. Alger seamlessly transitioned to, quickly establishing herself as one of the nation's top pitchers. She ranked seventh in the NCAA with a 0.97 ERA, leading the league in ERA and batting average against (.167). Kate was named to the NCAA All-Championship Team and helped her team secure their first national title. She continued her success in college, posting a 16-6 record with a 1.31 ERA and earning several accolades, including first team All-Conference and first team All-State honors.

The Buffalo Gap wrestling team has an impressive record, being 6-time district champions, 4-time sectional champions, and regional champions in 2024. They have produced 9 individual state champions, and many wrestlers consistently compete and place in the state tournament. In the 2023–2024 season, the team became inclusive for female wrestlers. During the first year, one female wrestler made it to the girls' state championship, reaching round 16 but had to forfeit due to injury. Another female wrestler also reached the state championship and wrestled in the VAWA, becoming a state champion in 2023–2024, the second wrestler to do so.

Buffalo Gap cheerleading has success. In the 2023–2024 season, the cheer team was declared Virginia UCA regional champions for the first time in school history. The team also competed in the UCA game day competition. While they did not receive bids to nationals, they did beat two nationally ranked teams, had zero deductions, and achieved their highest score to date.

Although the athletic programs are smaller and often have fewer athletes than their competitors, Buffalo Gap athletes continue to impress their community and make yearly state appearances in at least one sport.

== Notable alumni ==
- Donald DePoy, born August 10, 1949, fifth-generation bluegrass musician, music educator, and music event organizer.
- Tony Schiavone, former National Wrestling Alliance, World Championship Wrestling, World Wrestling Federation, and current All Elite Wrestling commentator, host, and producer as well as the leader of Slapdick Nation.
- Charles R. Miller, U.S. Army major general, BGHS class of 1986.
