= Augusta County Public Schools =

School district in Augusta County, Virginia, United States

- 18 Government Center Lane Verona, Virginia, 24482

District information
- Type: Public
- Grades: Pre-K–12
- Superintendent: Dr. Kelly Troxell
- Deputy superintendent(s): Dr. Miranda Ball
- Chair of the board: David R. Shiflet
- Schools: 19
- NCES District ID: 5100300

Students and staff
- Students: 10,130 (2024–25)
- Teachers: 722.10 (on an FTE basis)
- Student–teacher ratio: 14.03

Other information
- Website: www.augusta.k12.va.us/

Augusta County Public Schools is the organization that operates the public school system in Augusta County, Virginia. Located in the Shenandoah Valley, the district serves over 10,000 students and operates 19 schools: 9 elementary, 5 middle, 5 high. The district also operates a technical center.

== Leadership ==
=== Superintendent ===
Dr. Kelly Troxell is the current superintendent. Dr. Troxell previously served as the Executive Director of Personnel for the school district.

The previous superintendent, Dr. Eric W. Bond, was appointed in 2014. He was the district's Assistant Superintendent for Personnel and the Assistant Superintendent for Operations. In 2024, Bond was selected as the Virginia Region V Superintendent of the Year. Bond announced his retirement, effective on December 31, 2025.

=== School Board ===
There are seven members of the Augusta County School Board. As of 2026, the members are:

- Beverly Manor District – Daniel H. Whitmire
- Middle River District – David R. Shiflett, Chair
- North River District – Dr. Sharon F. Griffin
- Pastures District – Dr. John L. Ocheltree Jr.
- Riverheads District – vacant
- South River District – Mike J. Lawson
- Wayne District – Tim Z. Swortzel, Vice Chair

== Schools ==
As of 2024, Augusta County operates 19 schools. All schools in the county are fully accredited. The newest schools, Buffalo Gap and Riverheads Middle Schools, both opened in the fall of 2024.

=== High ===
- Buffalo Gap High School
- Fort Defiance High School
- Riverheads High School
- Stuarts Draft High School
- Wilson Memorial High School

=== Middle ===
- Buffalo Gap Middle School
- Riverheads Middle School
- S. Gordon Stewart Middle School
- Stuarts Draft Middle School
- Wilson Middle School

=== Elementary ===
- Churchville Elementary School
- Edward G. Clymore Elementary School
- Craigsville Elementary School
- Hugh K. Cassell Elementary School
- North River Elementary School
- Riverheads Elementary School
- Guy K. Stump Elementary School
- Stuarts Draft Elementary School
- Wilson Elementary School

=== Other ===
- Shenandoah Valley Governor's School
- Valley Career and Technical Center

== See also ==
- List of school divisions in Virginia
