= Fort Defiance High School =

Public school in Virginia, United States

Coordinates: 38°14′50.4″N 78°58′25.8″W

Location
- 195 Fort Defiance Rd; Fort Defiance, Virginia 24437

Information
- Type: Public school
- Locale: Rural, Fringe
- School district: Augusta County Public Schools
- NCES District ID: 5100300
- Superintendent: Kelly Troxell
- NCES School ID: 510030000124
- Principal: Fonda Morris
- Teaching staff: 52.15 (on an FTE basis)
- Grades: 9–12
- Enrollment: 731 (2024–25)
- Student to teacher ratio: 14.02
- Colors: Royal Blue, White
- Athletics: Baseball, Basketball, Cheerleading, Cross Country, Football, Golf, Marching band, Indoor Track, Soccer, Softball, Tennis, Track and Field, Volleyball, Wrestling
- Athletics conference: VHSL 2B Region; Shenandoah District
- Mascot: Native American
- Website: Official Website

Fort Defiance High School is a public school located in Fort Defiance, Virginia. It is often referred to by its initials, FDHS or Fort.

== Academics ==
Fort Defiance was rated Fully Accredited by the Virginia Department of Education in the 2005–2006 and 2006–2007 school years. Students scored above state average on all 2006 Standards of Learning tests. In 2006, students from Fort Defiance won the International Canon Envirothon. Fort Defiance offers two AP courses to students: AP United States History and AP United States Government and Politics. Dual Enrollment courses are also offered through Blue Ridge Community College in nearby Weyers Cave, VA. These courses allow students to earn college credit while still attending high school. The foreign languages offered at Fort Defiance are Spanish, Latin, and French. Students must take at least two years of two languages or three years of one.

== Athletics ==
Fort Defiance has won many district championships, and 13 state championships. The Girls' Tennis team won the 1998, 1996, and 1989 AA Virginia High School League State Tennis Championships. The Girls' tennis team won the 1987, 1988, 1990, and 1995 Virginia High School League State Winter Tennis Championships. The Boys' Cross Country Team won the 2003 AA State Championships and were runner up in the 2004 AA State Championships.

== Notable alumni ==
- Dell Curry, basketball player
- Quin Houff, racing driver
- Robert A Tuten, Track Player
