= Valley District (VHSL) =

School district in Virginia, U.S.

The 3A Valley District is a district in Region 3C of the Virginia High School League. As the district's name implies, all the schools are located in the central part of the Shenandoah Valley of Virginia, along Interstate 81. Most of the member schools are part of the Harrisonburg areas.

== Overview ==
In 2007, all of the Valley District member schools moved from Region II to Region III due to the growth of Region II and the realignment of the AA River Ridge District from Region III to Region IV. In addition, the district split into two separate districts after the regional shift. The Harrisonburg area schools (Broadway, Harrisonburg, Spotswood, and Turner Ashby) formed the AA Massanutten District. The Staunton area schools (Fort Defiance, Lee, Rockbridge County, Stuarts Draft, and Waynesboro) formed the AA Southern Valley District.

In 2010, the VHSL reestablished the Valley District, with a few modifications from the prior configuration. The Massanutten District teams would were joined by Fort Defiance, Robert E. Lee, and Waynesboro from the Southern Valley District. Rockbridge County returned to the AA Blue Ridge District and Stuarts Draft moved down to the A Shenandoah District. The new Valley District became a member of Region III in the Fall of 2011.

Fort Defiance, Robert E. Lee, Spotswood, and Waynesboro are participants of VHSL Division 3, while Broadway, Harrisonburg, and Turner Ashby are participants of VHSL Division 4. The VHSL Divisional Alignments only are effective in Football, Boys Basketball, and Girls Basketball and the divisions are based upon school enrollment.

In 2013, the VHSL released a new plan where Stuarts Draft High School rejoined the Valley District in the start of the 2013 school year from the Group A Shenandoah District, giving the district 8 teams.

The current district lineup was approved by the VHSL for the 2023-2027 cycle.

== Member schools as of 2024 ==
School	Location	Mascot	Colors	2025-26 9–12 enrollment
Broadway High School	Broadway	Gobblers		932
East Rockingham High School	Elkton	Eagles		821
Harrisonburg High School	Harrisonburg	Blue Streaks		998
Rocktown High School	Harrisonburg	Raptors		1,011
Spotswood High School	Penn Laird	Trailblazers		880
Turner Ashby High School	Bridgewater	Knights		998
William Monroe High School	Stanardsville	Green Dragons		952

== Former Members ==
School	Location	Mascot	Colors	Current District
Rockbridge County High School	Lexington	Wildcats		Shenandoah
Fort Defiance High School	Fort Defiance	Indians		Shenandoah
Robert E. Lee High School	Staunton	Fighting Leemen		Shenandoah
Stuarts Draft High School	Stuarts Draft	Cougars		Shenandoah
Waynesboro High School	Waynesboro	Little Giants		Shenandoah

Note: Robert E. Lee High School is now known as Staunton High School and their nickname is now the Storm. This name change happened after they left the Valley District

== District Titles ==
- Golf
  - 2011-Spotswood Regular Season & Tournament Champs
  - 2012-Spotswood Regular Season & Tournament Champs
- Football
  - 2011-Broadway
  - 2012- Robert E. Lee & Fort Defiance Regular Season Co-Champs
- Boys Cross Country
  - 2011-Spotswood
  - 2012-Fort Defiance
- Girls Cross County
  - 2011-Fort Defiance
  - 2012-Turner Ashby
- Competition Cheerleading
  - 2018-Spotswood
  - 2011-Harrisonburg Regular Season Champs/Broadway Tournament Champs
  - 2012-Harrisonburg Regular Season & Tournament Champs
- Volleyball
  - 2011-Fort Defiance Regular Season & Tournament Champs
  - 2012-Turner Ashby Regular Season Champs/Fort Defiance Tournament Champs
- Boys Basketball
  - 2018-Spotswood
  - 2012-Robert E. Lee Regular Season Champs/Broadway Tournament Champs
  - 2013-Spotswood Regular Season & Tournament Champs
- Girls Basketball
  - 2018-Spotswood
  - 2012-Robert E. Lee Regular Season Champs/Spotswood Tournament Champs
  - 2013-Spotswood Regular Season & Tournament Champs
- Boys Swim & Dive
  - 2012-Turner Ashby
  - 2013-Turner Ashby
- Girls Swim & Dive
  - 2012-Spotswood
  - 2013-Spotswood
- Boys Indoor Track
  - 2012-Fort Defiance
  - 2013-Turner Ashby
- Girls Indoor Track
  - 2012-Harrisonburg
  - 2013-Harrisonburg
- Wrestling
  - 2012-Turner Ashby Regular Season & Tournament Champs
  - 2013-Harrisonburg Regular Season Champs/Turner Ashby Tournament Champs
- Baseball
  - 2012-Spotswood Regular Season Champs/Broadway Tournament Champs
  - 2013-Spotswood Regular Season & Tournament Champs
  - 2021-Spotswood Regular Season
  - 2022-Spotswood Regular Season
  - 2023-Spotswood Regular Season
  - 2024-Spotswood Regular Season
  - 2025-East Rockingham Regular Season
- Softball
  - 2012-Fort Defiance Regular Season & Tournament Champs
  - 2013-Fort Defiance Tournament Champs
- Boys Tennis
  - 2012-Harrisonburg Regular Season & Tournament Champs
  - 2013-Spotswood Regular Season & Tournament Champs
- Girls Tennis
  - 2012-Spotswood Regular Season & Tournament Champs
  - 2013-Broadway Regular Season & Tournament Champs
- Boys Soccer
  - 2012-Harrisonburg Regular Season Champs/Spotswood Tournament Champs
  - 2013-Turner Ashby Regular Season & Tournament Champs
- Girls Soccer
  - 2012-Spotswood Regular Season & Tournament Champs
  - 2013-Harrisonburg Regular Season Champs/Broadway Tournament Champs
- Boys Track & Field
  - 2012-Turner Ashby
  - 2013-Turner Ashby
- Girls Track & Field
  - 2012-Harrisonburg
  - 2013-Turner Ashby

== Regional Titles & Runner-Ups ==
- 2011-2012
  - Spotswood Boys Golf—Region 3 Runner-Up
  - Spotswood Boys Cross Country—Region 3 Runner-Up
  - Broadway Football—Region 3 Division 4 Champions
  - Turner Ashby Boys Swim & Dive—Region 3 Champions
  - Spotswood Girls Swim & Dive—Region 3 Champions
  - Robert E. Lee Girls Basketball- Region 3 Division 3 Champions
  - Broadway Girls Basketball- Region 3 Division 4 Champions
  - Spotswood Girls Tennis- Region 3 Runner-Up
  - Harrisonburg Boys Tennis- Region 3 Runner-Up
  - Spotswood Girls Soccer- Region 3 Runner-Up
  - Broadway Softball- Region 3 Champions
- 2012-2013
  - Spotswood Boys Golf—Region 3 Champions
  - Harrisonburg Cheerleading—Region 3 Champions
  - Spotswood Girls Swim & Dive—Region 3 Champions
  - Spotswood Boys Basketball—Region 3 Champions
  - Fort Defiance Boys Basketball—Region 3 Runner-Up
  - Spotswood Girls Basketball—Region 3 Champions
  - Broadway Girls Tennis—Region 3 Runner-Up
  - Spotswood Boys Tennis—Region 3 Runner-Up
- 2018-2019
  - Spotswood Girls Basketball-Region 3 Champions
  - Competition Cheer-Region 3 Champions
- 2024-2025
  - Spotswood Baseball-Region 3 Champions

== State Championships & Runner-Ups ==
- 2011-2012
  - Robert E. Lee Girls Basketball Division 3 State Champions
  - Broadway Softball AA State Runner-Up
  - Spotswood Girls Tennis AA State Runner-Up
- 2012-2013
  - Spotswood Golf AA State Runner-Up
  - Spotswood Girls Basketball Division 3 State Champions
  - Spotswood Boys Basketball Division State Runner-Up
- 2016-2017
  - Turner Ashby Baseball
- 2018-2019
  - Spotswood Girls Basketball State Champions
- 2024-2025
  - Spotswood Girls Cross County
  - Spotswood Boys Basketball
  - Broadway Softball
  - Spotswood Baseball
