= Bull Run District =

Region 1B athletic district

Bull Run District is a Region 1B athletic district under the Virginia High School League (VHSL).

== Member schools as of 2024 ==
School	Location	Mascot	Colors	2022-23 9–12 enrollment
Central High School	Woodstock	Falcon		804
Clarke County High School	Berryville	Eagles		680
Luray High School	Luray	Bulldogs		502
Madison County High School	Madison	Mountaineers		424
Page County High School	Shenandoah	Panthers		552
Rappahannock County High School	Washington	Panthers		312
Stonewall Jackson High School	Quicksburg	Generals		598
Strasburg High School	Strasburg	Rams		416

Note: In 2020, the Shenandoah County School Board voted to change the name of Stonewall Jackson High School to Mountain View High School. In 2024, the school board reversed that decision, reverting the name to Stonewall Jackson High School

== Former Members ==
School	Location	Mascot	Colors	Current District
East Rockingham High School	Elkton	Eagles		Valley
Manassas Park High School	Manassas Park	Cougars		Northwestern
Warren County High School	Front Royal	Wildcats		Northwestern
William Monroe High School	Stanardsville	Green Dragons		Valley
