= AA Massanutten District =

US high school sports conference

The AA Massanutten District was a high school conference of the Virginia High School League, consisting of schools in Rockingham County and Harrisonburg, Virginia. Schools in the Massanutten District competed in AA Region III with the schools in the AA Blue Ridge District, the AA Seminole District, and the AA Southern Valley District.

The district was created in 2007 out of the former members of the AA Valley District which were located in the Harrisonburg area.

== Member schools ==
- Broadway High School Gobblers of Broadway, Virginia
- Harrisonburg High School Blue Streaks of Harrisonburg, Virginia
- Spotswood High School Trailblazers of Penn Laird, Virginia
- Turner Ashby High School Knights of Bridgewater, Virginia

== End of the District ==
It was announced in 2009 that the Massanutten District would join part of the Southern Valley District and become the "Valley District." The member schools would be Spotswood, Turner Ashby, Harrisonburg, Broadway, Waynesboro, Robert E. Lee, and Fort Defiance. The final season of the Massanutten District was the 2010–2011 season.

== District championships ==
Girls Volleyball – 2007-Spotswood, 2008-Turner Ashby, 2009-Spotswood, 2010-Turner Ashby

Boys Cross Country – 2007-Spotswood, 2008-Spotswood, 2009-Spotswood, 2010-Spotswood

Girls Cross Country – 2007-Turner Ashby, 2008-Harrisonburg, 2009-Harrisonburg, 2010-Turner Ashby

Football – 2008-Harrisonburg, 2009-Harrisonburg, 2010-Harrisonburg

Competition Cheer – 2007-Spotswood, 2008-Turner Ashby, 2009-Spotswood, 2010-Spotswood

Golf – 2007-Harrisonburg, 2008-Turner Ashby, 2009-Spotswood, 2010-Harrisonburg

Boys Basketball – 2008-Harrisonburg, 2009-Spotswood, 2010-Spotswood, 2011-Broadway

Girls Basketball – 2008-Turner Ashby, 2009 Co-Champions-Turner Ashby & Spotswood, 2010-Turner Ashby, 2011-Spotswood

Boys Swimming & Diving- 2008-Waynesboro, 2009-Waynesboro, 2010-Waynesboro, 2011-Turner Ashby

Girls Swimming & Diving – 2008-Spotswood, 2009-Spotswood, 2010-Spotswood, 2011-Spotswood

Boys Indoor Track – 2008-Spotswood, 2009-Harrisonburg, 2010-Spotswood, 2011-Harrisonburg

Girls Indoor Track – 2008-Turner Ashby, 2009-Spotswood, 2010-Spotswood, 2011-Harrisonburg

Wrestling – 2008-Turner Ashby, 2009-Turner Ashby, 2010-Turner Ashby, 2011-Turner Ashby

Scholastic Bowl – 2008-Spotswood, 2009-Spotswood, 2010-Spotswood, 2011-Harrisonburg

Forensics – 2008-Spotswood, 2009-Spotswood, 2010-Spotswood, 2011-Harrisonburg

Baseball – 2008-Turner Ashby, 2009-Turner Ashby, 2010-Broadway

Softball – 2008-Turner Ashby, 2009-Turner Ashby, 2010-Broadway, 2011-Broadway

Boys Outdoor Track – 2008-Turner Ashby, 2009-Spotswood, 2010-Harrisonburg, 2011-Turner Ashby

Girls Outdoor Track – 2008-Spotswood, 2009-Spotswood, 2010-Spotswood, 2011-Harrisonburg

Boys Tennis – 2008-Harrisonburg, 2009-Harrisonburg, 2010-Spotswood, 2011-Spotswood

Girls Tennis – 2008-Spotswood, 2009-Spotswood, 2010-Spotswood, 2011-Spotswood

Boys Soccer – 2008-Turner Ashby, 2009-Turner Ashby, 2010-Harrisonburg

Girls Soccer – 2008-Harrisonburg, 2009-Harrisonburg, 2010-Harrisonburg

== Regional Champions ==
2007–2008

Spotswood Boys Cross Country Team

Turner Ashby Golf Team

Spotswood Boys Diving Team

Spotswood Girls Diving Team

Spotswood Girls Swimming Team

Turner Ashby Wrestling Team

Spotswood Girls Tennis Team

Harrisonburg Boys Tennis Team

Turner Ashby Boys Soccer Team

Harrisonburg Girls Soccer Team

Turner Ashby Girls Softball Team

2008–2009

Spotswood Boys Cross Country Team

Harrisonburg Golf Team

Turner Ashby Wrestling Team

Harrisonburg Boys Indoor Track Team

Spotswood Boys Basketball Team

Turner Ashby Girls Basketball Team

Spotswood Scholastic Bowl Team

Spotswood Girls Tennis Team

Harrisonburg Boys Tennis Team

Spotswood Girls Outdoor Track Team

Harrisonburg Boys Soccer Team

Turner Ashby Girls Softball Team

2009–2010

Spotswood Boys Cross Country Team

Broadway Boys Basketball Team

Spotswood Girls Basketball Team

Turner Ashby Wrestling Team

Harrisonburg Boys Soccer Team

2010–2011

Harrisonburg Football Team

Harrisonburg Scholastic Bowl Team

Spotswood Girls Swimming & Diving Team

Spotswood Girls Basketball Team (AA Division 3)

Turner Ashby Girls Basketball Team (AA Division 4)
