= HCPS =

HCPS may refer to:

- Harford County Public Schools
- Harrisonburg City Public Schools
- Hantavirus cardiopulmonary syndrome
- Healthcare Professionals
- Henderson County Public Schools
- Henrico County Public Schools
- Hillsborough County Public Schools

== See also ==
- HCP (disambiguation)
