= Broadway High School =

Broadway High School may refer to:

- Broadway High School (San Jose, California)
- Broadway High School (Broadway, Virginia)
- Broadway High School (Seattle)
