= Massanutten (disambiguation) =

Massanutten, Virginia is a census-designated place in Rockingham County. Massanutten may also refer to:

- Massanutton Heights, a historic home located near Luray, Page County, Virginia
- Massanutten Military Academy, a military academy for grades 7–12
- Massanutten Mountain, a mountain of the Ridge-and-Valley Appalachians
- Massanutten Trail, a National Recreation Trail in George Washington National Forest
- AA Massanutten District, a defunct high school athletics conference
