= Harrisonburg High School =

Harrisonburg High School may refer to:

- Harrisonburg High School (Louisiana) in Harrisonburg, Louisiana
- Harrisonburg High School (Virginia) in Harrisonburg, Virginia
