= Tyler Nickel =

American basketball player (born 2003)

No. 55 – New York Knicks
- Position: Small forward
- League: NBA

Personal information
- Born: September 5, 2003 (age 23) Harrisonburg, Virginia, U.S.
- Listed height: 6 ft 7 in (2.01 m)
- Listed weight: 220 lb (100 kg)

Career information
- High school: East Rockingham (Elkton, Virginia)
- College: North Carolina (2022–2023); Virginia Tech (2023–2024); Vanderbilt (2024–2026)
- NBA draft: 2026: 2nd round, 47th overall pick
- Drafted by: Phoenix Suns
- Playing career: 2026–present

Career history
- 2026–present: New York Knicks
- 2026–present: →Westchester Knicks
- Stats at NBA.com
- Stats at Basketball Reference

Tyler Christopher Nickel (born September 5, 2003) is an American basketball player for the New York Knicks of the National Basketball Association (NBA), on a two-way contract with the Westchester Knicks of the NBA G League. He played college basketball for the North Carolina Tar Heels, Virginia Tech Hokies and Vanderbilt Commodores.

== Early life and high school ==
Nickel attended East Rockingham High School in Elkton, Virginia. As a junior, he averaged 33.7 points, 10.1 rebounds, 3.9 assists and 1.6 steals per game. Coming out of high school, Nickel was rated as a four-star recruit by 247Sports, receiving offers from schools such as Butler, LSU, North Carolina and Virginia Tech. He committed to play college basketball at North Carolina.

== College career ==
=== North Carolina ===
As a freshman during the 2022–23 season, Nickel played in 25 games, averaging 2.1 points and 0.6 rebounds per game. After the season, he entered the NCAA transfer portal.

=== Virginia Tech ===
Nickel transferred to play for the Virginia Tech Hokies. On January 10, 2024, he dropped 24 points and five three-pointers in a victory versus Clemson. Nickel finished the 2023–24 season averaging 8.8 points, 2.2 rebounds and 1.3 assists in 33 games played with seven starts. After the season, he once again entered the NCAA transfer portal.

=== Vanderbilt ===
Nickel transferred to play for the Vanderbilt Commodores. In 2024–25, he started in all 33 games, averaging 10.4 points, 2.4 rebounds and 0.9 assists per game. On December 13, 2025, Nickel dropped a career-high 30 points and eight three-pointers in a win against Central Arkansas. On February 14, 2026, he scored a game-high 25 points in a victory over Texas A&M. Nickel started all 36 games, averaging 13.5 points, 3.3 rebounds and 1.2 assists per game, while shooting 40% from three. After the conclusion of the season, he declared for the 2026 NBA draft.

== Professional career ==
On June 24, 2026, Nickel was selected by the Phoenix Suns with the 47th overall pick in the 2026 NBA draft then immediately traded to the New York Knicks in a multi-team trade that sent Koa Peat to the Suns.
