= Stonewall Jackson High School (Shenandoah County, Virginia) =

Location
- 150 Stonewall Ln; Quicksburg, Virginia 22847; United States; 38°42′13.4″N 78°39′48″W

Information
- Former names: Mountain View High School (2021–2024); Stonewall Jackson High School (1959–2021)
- Type: Public
- Established: 1959
- School district: Shenandoah County Public Schools
- Principal: Michael Lenox
- Grades: 9 to 12
- Enrollment: 598 (2023–24)
- Colors: Red, Black, and White
- Athletics conference: A Bull Run District; Region B
- Mascot: General
- Website: https://sjhs.shenandoah.k12.va.us/

Stonewall Jackson High School is a public high school located in Quicksburg, Shenandoah County, Virginia, United States. It is home to almost 625 students, in grades 9–12. The school is part of the Shenandoah County Public School System. Michael Lenox is the current principal.

Named after the Confederate General, Stonewall Jackson High School opened as a whites-only school in 1960. On July 9, 2020, the Shenandoah County School Board voted to rename the school to Mountain View High School, one of many US schools to remove Confederate names in the wake of the George Floyd protests. In May 2024, the Shenandoah County School Board voted 5–1 to restore the Stonewall Jackson name. The school is the first school in the country to restore a removed Confederate name.

The school's colors are red, black, and white, and the school mascot is "the Generals."

== History ==
Stonewall Jackson High School was dedicated on April 24, 1960, according to school board minutes. It was opened as a segregated, whites-only school during the 1959–1960 school year, as one of the three newly consolidated schools in the county. Thomas L. Snyder was approved as the first principal of the high school. The first year's enrollment in grades 8–12 was 501. There were originally nineteen classrooms. In 1964, four classrooms were added while one was lost in becoming the guidance office. Major construction was done in 1993, with six classrooms added which became known as the science wing.

Renovations were done and new additions were built in 2004. Each existing classroom was renovated and air conditioning was installed. New construction consisted of a gymnasium, four locker rooms, weight room, wrestling room, indoor/outdoor concession stand, PE offices, training room, laundry room, band room, chorus room, library media center, office suite, guidance office suite, clinic, expanded cafeteria, seven new classrooms, and a teacher's workroom.

Starting in the 2018–2019 school year, 8th grade was returned to the high school to accommodate for overcrowding. In 2023, eighth grade returned to the middle school.

== Naming controversy ==
On July 9, 2020, the Shenandoah County School Board voted to change the school's name from "Stonewall Jackson High School" to "Mountain View High School." As Stonewall Jackson High School, it was named for Thomas "Stonewall" Jackson, a Civil War general who fought for the Confederacy. At the same time, the school board also voted to change the name of Ashby-Lee Elementary School and to remove the "Rebel" mascot from North Fork Middle School. This was part of the Board's next steps for a resolution condemning racism and affirming the division's commitment to an inclusive school environment for all. Residents circulated petitions both for and against the name changes. One petition in support of the name changes garnered more than 2,000 signatures, while another petition against the name changes garnered more than 3,000 signatures. Committees made up of parents, citizens, staff, and students presented recommendations for new names and mascots to the School Board in December 2020, with a School Board vote at the January 14, 2021, meeting, 6–0, in favor of changing the name of the school to Mountain View High School.

On June 10, 2022, after three school board members running on a platform against teaching Critical Race Theory in schools were elected, a vote to restore the Stonewall Jackson name was defeated in a 3–3 vote.

On May 10, 2024, a new school board voted 5–1 to reverse the name change, and the school was renamed again, this time back to the original Stonewall Jackson High School. As a result, the NAACP filed a lawsuit against the school district, on the grounds that the restoration endorses discrimination against Black students. This lawsuit reached a landmark in September 9, 2025 when a federal judge ruled that plaintiffs' First Amendment rights had been violated, arguing that the school used them as "mobile billboards" for Confederate symbolism. The judge refrained from issuing an order to change the school names, opting instead to save such a decision until ruling on the 14th Amendment, Title VI of the Civil Rights Act of 1964, and the Equal Education Opportunities Act in December 2025. On August 6, 2026, the same federal judge ruled that the school board had discriminated against Black students, violating the 14th Amendment, Civil Rights Act, and Equal Educational Opportunities Act. The judge ordered the school board to rename the schools. On August 13, the school board voted 6-0 to appeal the ruling.
