= Miller–Kite House =

Historic house in Virginia, United States

- U.S. National Register of Historic Places
- Virginia Landmarks Register
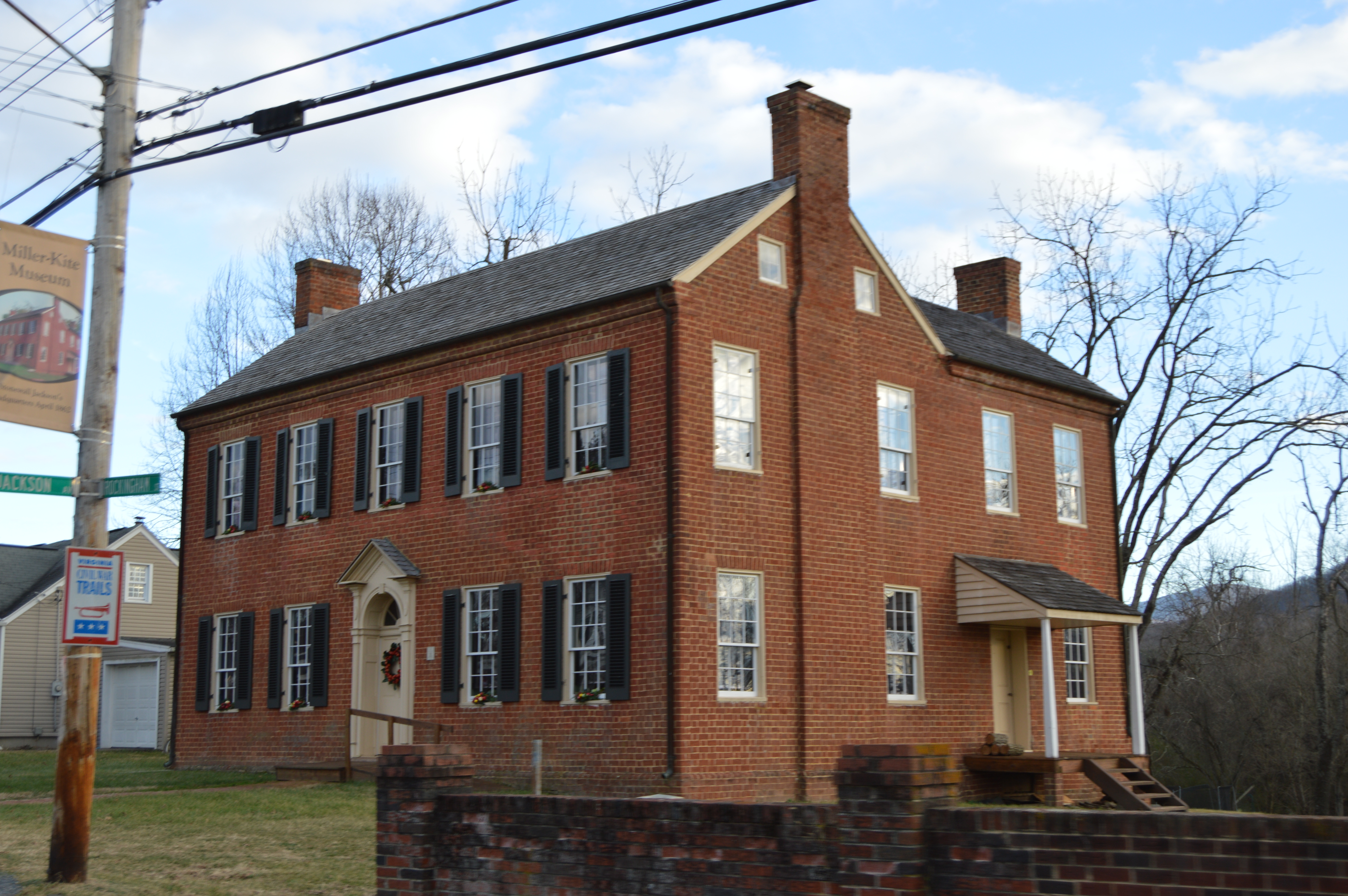
- Front and western side

- Location within Virginia Location within the United States
- Location: 302 Rockingham St., Elkton, Virginia
- Coordinates: 38°24′31″N 78°36′57″W
- Area: Less than 1 acre (0.40 ha)
- Built: 1827
- Built by: Samuel Gibbons
- Architectural style: Modified I-house
- NRHP reference No.: 79003083
- VLR No.: 216-5063

Significant dates
- Added to NRHP: February 1, 1979
- Designated VLR: October 17, 1978

Miller–Kite House, also known as Kite House, is a historic home located at Elkton, Rockingham County, Virginia. It was built in 1827, and is a two-story, five-bay, L-shaped brick I-house dwelling. It has a cross-gable roof with eaves decorated with sawnwork filigree. It is traditionally believed to have been the headquarters of General Stonewall Jackson during the time that the renowned Valley Campaign was planned in April 1862. The house is a town landmark and museum operated by the Elkton Historical Society.

It was listed on the National Register of Historic Places in 1979.
