= Kite Mansion =

Historic house in Virginia, United States

- U.S. National Register of Historic Places
- Virginia Landmarks Register
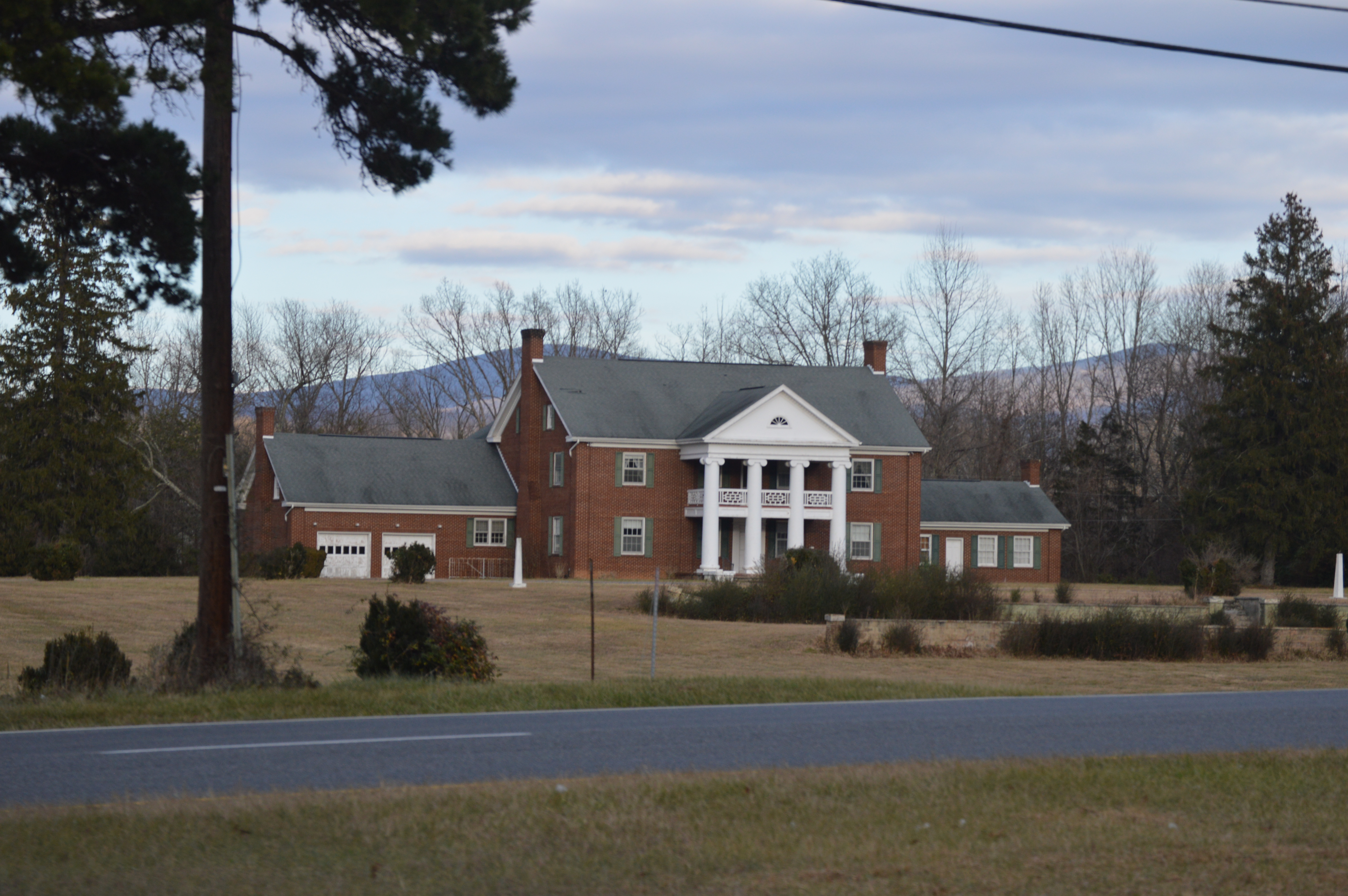
- Distant view of the house

- Location within Virginia Location within the United States
- Location: 17271 Spotswood Trail, Elkton, Virginia
- Coordinates: 38°24′11″N 78°36′15″W
- Area: 5.8 acres (2.3 ha)
- Built: 1948
- Architect: William Edgar Kite
- Architectural style: Colonial Revival
- NRHP reference No.: 07000049
- VLR No.: 082-5408

Significant dates
- Added to NRHP: February 13, 2007
- Designated VLR: September 6, 2006

The Kite Mansion, also known as the Kite House, is a historic home located in Elkton, Rockingham County, Virginia. It was built in 1948, and consists of a two-story, five-bay, central-passage plan main block with flanking one-story wings in the Colonial Revival style. It is constructed of concrete block and clad in running bond brick. The front facade features a Classical Revival style, pedimented, two-story portico. Also on the property is a contributing greenhouse.

It was listed on the National Register of Historic Places in 2007.
