= John Wade (American football) =

American football player (born 1975)

No. 66, 76, 71
- Position: Center

Personal information
- Born: January 25, 1975 (age 51); Harrisonburg, Virginia, U.S.
- Listed height: 6 ft 5 in (1.96 m)
- Listed weight: 299 lb (136 kg)

Career information
- High school: Harrisonburg
- College: Marshall
- NFL draft: 1998: 5th round, 148th overall pick

Career history
- Jacksonville Jaguars (1998–2002); Tampa Bay Buccaneers (2003–2007); Oakland Raiders (2008–2009)

Awards and highlights
- NCAA I-AA national champion (1996); First-team All-MAC (1997)

Career NFL statistics
- Games played: 131
- Games started: 110
- Fumble recoveries: 2
- Stats at Pro Football Reference

Robert John Wade (born January 25, 1975) is an American former professional football player who was a center in the National Football League (NFL). He was selected by the Jacksonville Jaguars in the fifth round of the 1998 NFL draft. He played college football for the Marshall Thundering Herd.

Wade also played for the Tampa Bay Buccaneers and Oakland Raiders.

== Early life ==
While attending Harrisonburg High School in Harrisonburg, Virginia, Wade was a three-year letterman in both football and baseball. In football, he was a first-team All-District and a second-team All-State honoree. In 2006, Harrisonburg High School named their weight room "The Wade Room", after him.

Wade attended Marshall University and started 2 years.

== Professional career ==
Wade, a 12-year professional and perennial starter, split his time in the NFL between the Jacksonville Jaguars (1998–2002) and Tampa Bay Buccaneers (2003–2007). He started 88 games in the past six years, missing just eight games in 2004 due to a dislocated knee. During John Wade's NFL career he started a total of 110 games, including 6 playoff starts. On March 31, 2008, he signed with the Oakland Raiders. Wade was released by the Raiders during the 2009 pre-season. They agreed to an injury settlement.
