= East Rockingham High School =

Location
- 250 Eagle Rock Road; Elkton, Virginia 22827; United States; 38°23′54.1″N 78°39′32.5″W

Information
- School type: Public, high school
- Motto: Labor Omnia Vincit ("Hard work conquers all.")
- Opened: August 2010
- School district: Rockingham County Public Schools
- Principal: Marc Sweigart
- Grades: 9-12
- Enrollment: 720 (2016-17)
- Colors: Red and Black
- Athletics conference: Valley District; Region C
- Mascot: Eagles
- Website: School Website

East Rockingham High School is located in Elkton, Virginia, United States; it is part of Rockingham County Public Schools and opened in August 2010. It relieved a severe overcrowding problem at Spotswood High School, which currently houses around 950 students. East Rockingham competes athletically in the VHSL Valley District and Region 3C. The principal is Marc Sweigart. The assistant principals are Cory Blanton, Molly Smith, and Janae Pettit. The school's mascot is the Eagle and their school colors are red and black. The main rival of East Rockingham is Spotswood.

== Notable alumni ==
- Tyler Nickel, college basketball player
