= Landon Turner =

American football player (born 1993)

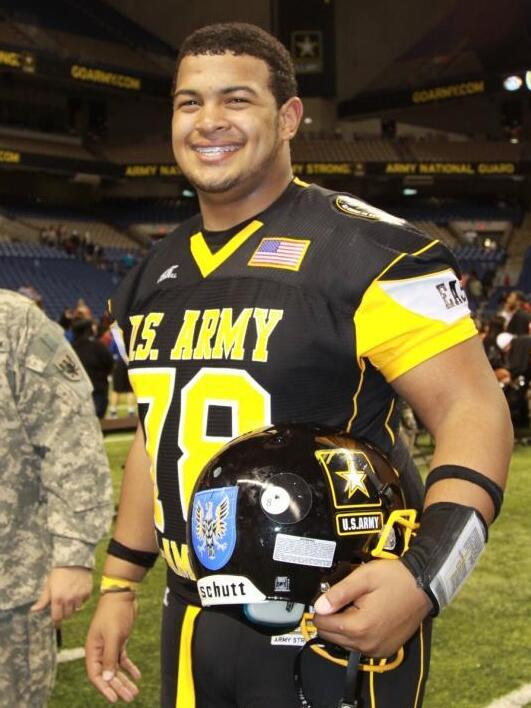
- Turner at the 2011 U.S. Army All-American Bowl

No. 78
- Position: Guard

Personal information
- Born: May 15, 1993 (age 33); Morgantown, West Virginia, U.S.
- Listed height: 6 ft 4 in (1.93 m)
- Listed weight: 325 lb (147 kg)

Career information
- High school: Harrisonburg (Harrisonburg, Virginia)
- College: North Carolina
- NFL draft: 2016: undrafted

Career history
- New Orleans Saints (2016–2018); Minnesota Vikings (2018)*; Carolina Panthers (2018–2019)*; Seattle Seahawks (2019)*
- * Offseason or practice squad member only

Awards and highlights
- First-team All-American (2015); First-team All-ACC (2015); Jim Parker Trophy (2015)

Career NFL statistics
- Games played: 7
- Games started: 1
- Stats at Pro Football Reference

Landon Turner (born May 15, 1993) is an American former professional football player who was a guard in the National Football League (NFL). He played college football for the North Carolina Tar Heels. His uncle Jim Braxton played for the Bills and Dolphins in the 1970s.

== Early life ==
Turner was a four-year starter at Harrisonburg High School in Harrisonburg, Virginia. He was All-State his junior and senior years, as he paved the way for running back Michael Holmes, who later played at Virginia Tech, to rush for more than 5,000 yards combined in both seasons. In Turner's senior season, he helped Harrisonburg to the VHSL Division 4 state final, where they lost 41–21 to Alex Carter's Briar Woods High School. Turner was named a U.S. Army All-American and Parade All-American following his senior year.

College recruiting
Name	Hometown	School	Height	Weight	40^{‡}	Commit date
Landon Turner; OG	Harrisonburg, VA	Harrisonburg HS	6 ft 5 in (1.96 m)	308 lb (140 kg)	5.3	Jul 11, 2010
Landon Turner; OG	Recruit ratings: Scout: Rivals: (80)					
Overall recruit ranking: Scout: 16 Rivals: 16
‡ Refers to 40-yard dash; Note: In many cases, Scout, Rivals, 247Sports, On3, and ESPN may conflict in their listings of height, weight and 40 time.; In these cases, the average was taken. ESPN grades are on a 100-point scale.; Sources: "North Carolina Commit List for 2011". Rivals.; "Scout.com Football Recruiting: North Carolina". Scout.; "RecruitTracker 2011: North Carolina". ESPN.; "Scout.com Team Recruiting Rankings". Scout.; "2011 Team Ranking". Rivals.com.

== College career ==
After redshirting his first year at North Carolina, Turner saw action in twelve games in 2012. He served as a backup his first eight games, before replacing an injured Brennan Williams at right guard for the final four games of the season. He would remain a starter throughout his four years. In his junior year, he was named 3rd team All-ACC by the media. As a senior, he was named consensus 1st-Team All-ACC and 1st Team All-American by the Associated Press (AP) and won the Jim Parker Trophy.

== Professional career ==
=== New Orleans Saints ===
Turner was signed by the New Orleans Saints as an undrafted free agent following the 2016 NFL draft.

On September 2, 2017, Turner was waived by the Saints and was signed to the practice squad the next day. He signed a reserve/future contract with the Saints on January 16, 2018.

On September 1, 2018, Turner was waived by the Saints. He was re-signed to the practice squad on October 24, but was released three days later.

=== Minnesota Vikings ===
On October 30, 2018, Turner was signed to the Minnesota Vikings' practice squad. He was released by the Vikings on November 8.

=== Carolina Panthers ===
On December 19, 2018, Turner was signed to the Carolina Panthers' practice squad. He signed a reserve/future contract with the Panthers on December 31. Turner was waived by Carolina on May 29, 2019.

=== Seattle Seahawks ===
On August 20, 2019, Turner was signed by the Seattle Seahawks. He was waived by the Seahawks as a part of final roster cuts on August 31.
