= Bon Air (Elkton, Virginia) =

Historic house in Virginia, United States

- U.S. National Register of Historic Places
- Virginia Landmarks Register
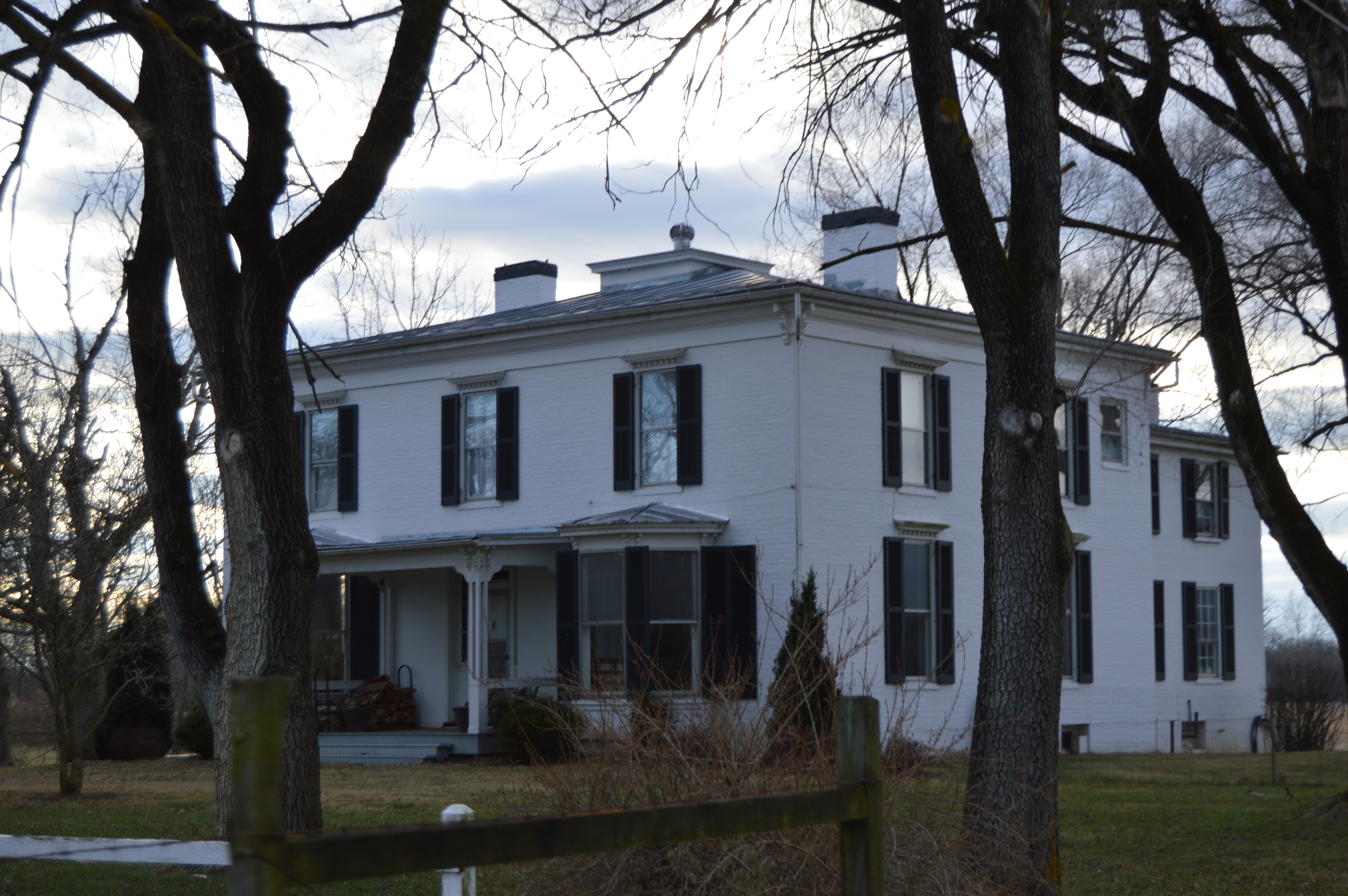
- Front and western side

- Location within Virginia Location within the United States
- Location: 2477 Bear Lithia Rd., near Elkton, Virginia
- Coordinates: 38°26′10″N 78°37′8″W
- Area: 0.8 acres (0.32 ha)
- Built: c. 1870
- Architectural style: Italianate, Greek Revival
- NRHP reference No.: 07000399
- VLR No.: 082-5157

Significant dates
- Added to NRHP: May 2, 2007
- Designated VLR: March 7, 2007

Bon Air, also known as the Adam and Susan Bear House and Bear Lithia, is a historic home located near Elkton, Rockingham County, Virginia. It was built about 1870, and is a two-story, central-passage plan brick dwelling with Italianate and Greek Revival style decorative details. It has a metal-sheathed, hip-and-deck roof, a rear two story ell, front and back porches, and two one-story bay windows on the front facade. Also on the property is a contributing two-level meat house/storage building. The house stands next to Bear Lithia Springs, a boldly flowing water source acquired by the Bear family during the colonial period and commercially exploited in the late-19th and early-20th centuries.

It was listed on the National Register of Historic Places in 2007.
