= Henry G. Blosser =

American nuclear physicist

Henry "Hank" Gabriel Blosser (March 16, 1928, Harrisonburg, Virginia – March 20, 2013, East Lansing, Michigan) was an American nuclear physicist, known as a director for designing and building superconducting cyclotrons.

== Biography ==
His father, Emanuel Blosser (1877–1953), was a prominent citizen of Harrisonburg, Virginia, and was extremely successful in the poultry business and in banking. After graduating from Harrisonburg High School in 1945, Henry Blosser attended the University of Virginia (UVA) for a year and then served for two years in the U.S. Navy. At UVA he was an undergraduate from 1948 to 1951, when he graduated with a bachelor's degree in mathematics. From 1951 to 1954 he was a graduate student in physics at UVA, graduating with an M.S. in 1952 and a Ph.D. in 1954. His Ph.D. thesis Large-angle scattering of electrons at 65 kilovolts was supervised by Frank L. Hereford Jr.

From 1954 to 1958 in Oak Ridge National Laboratory's Cyclotron Nuclear Research Group, Blosser was a physicist and group leader. At Michigan State University (MSU), he was an associate professor from 1958 to 1961, a full professor from 1961 to 1990, and a university distinguished professor from 1990 until he retired in 2003. At MSU's cyclotron laboratory he was the director 1958 to 1985 and co-director from 1985 to 1988, when he resigned as co-director. From 1984 until his death in 2013 he was also an adjunct professor in Wayne State University's department of radiation oncology.

Henry developed a new generation of superconducting cyclotrons that redefined the nature of cyclotrons. The driving idea was that, compared with a typical cyclotron, the average magnetic field could be three times larger and the radius three times smaller for a given energy. That reduced the mass of the magnet steel by a factor of 15–20 and the cost of the cyclotron as well as that of the necessary building infrastructure.

After formally retiring from MSU in 2013, he developed cyclotrons for cancer therapy.

He used his experience in cyclotron miniaturization to build a neutron-producing machine so small that it could be mounted on a gantry and rotated around the patient being treated, which helped reduce damage to tissue surrounding the tumor. The cyclotron was installed at Harper Hospital in Detroit, and from 1992 to 2012, it treated more than 2000 patients. Later Henry developed and patented a cyclotron that produced beams of 250-MeV protons for cancer therapy ...

In 1968 Blosser was elected a Fellow of the American Physical Society. He was a Guggenheim Fellow for the academic year 1973–1974. In 1984 he was one of ten people designated as "Michiganian of the Year" by The Detroit News.

In 1992 he received, jointly with Robert E. Pollock, the American Physical Society's Tom W. Bonner Prize in Nuclear Physics for pioneering development of innovations in particle accelerators. Blosser's work was cited as follows:

The room temperature and superconducting cyclotron developments and the novel beam cooling techniques have formed the basis for a new generation of facilities throughout the world which are currently providing important tools to advance our understanding of nuclear and particle properties in the medium energy regime. These developments have also led to important advances in accelerator techniques for the neighboring disciplines of Atomic and Medical Physics.

Upon his death in 2013 he was survived by his widow, 4 children, 14 grandchildren, and 2 great-grandchildren.

== Selected publications ==
- Nolen, J.A.; Mallory, M.L.; Dubois, M.J.; Gavalya, A.R.; Harwood, L.H.; Kashy, E.; Laumer, H.W.; Zeller, A.F.; Blosser, H.G. (1983). "The Integrated Cryogenic—Superconducting Beam Transport System Planned for MSU". Proceedings of the 12th International Conference on High-Energy Accelerators, Held at Fermilab, August 11–16, 1983. pp. 549–551.
- Blosser, H. G.; Powers, W. E.; Maughan, R. L.; Orton, C. G.; Ragan, D. P.; Blosser, G. F.; Burleigh, R. J.; Jemison, E. B. (1984). "Superconducting cyclotron for neutron radiation therapy". Proceedings of the 10th International Conference on Cyclotrons and their Applications, East Lansing, Michigan, USA, 30 April – 3 May 1984 (PDF). pp. 431–435.
- Maughan, R.L.; Blosser, H.G.; Blosser, E.B.; McEnhill, K. (1996). "Cryogenic aspects of the operation of a superconducting cyclotron-based neutron therapy facility". Bulletin du Cancer/Radiothérapie. 83: 146s – 152s. doi:10.1016/0924-4212(96)84901-2. PMID 8949768.
- Maughan, R. L.; Yudelev, M.; Porter, A. T.; Forman, J. D.; Blosser, H. G.; Blosser, E. B.; Blosser, G. F. (1999). "Neutron Radiation Therapy with the Harper Hospital Superconducting Cyclotron: Six years Operating Experience". Proceedings of the 15th International Conference on Cyclotrons and their Applications, Caen, France, 14–19 June 1998 (PDF). pp. 141–144.
