= Akeem Jordan =

American football player (born 1985)

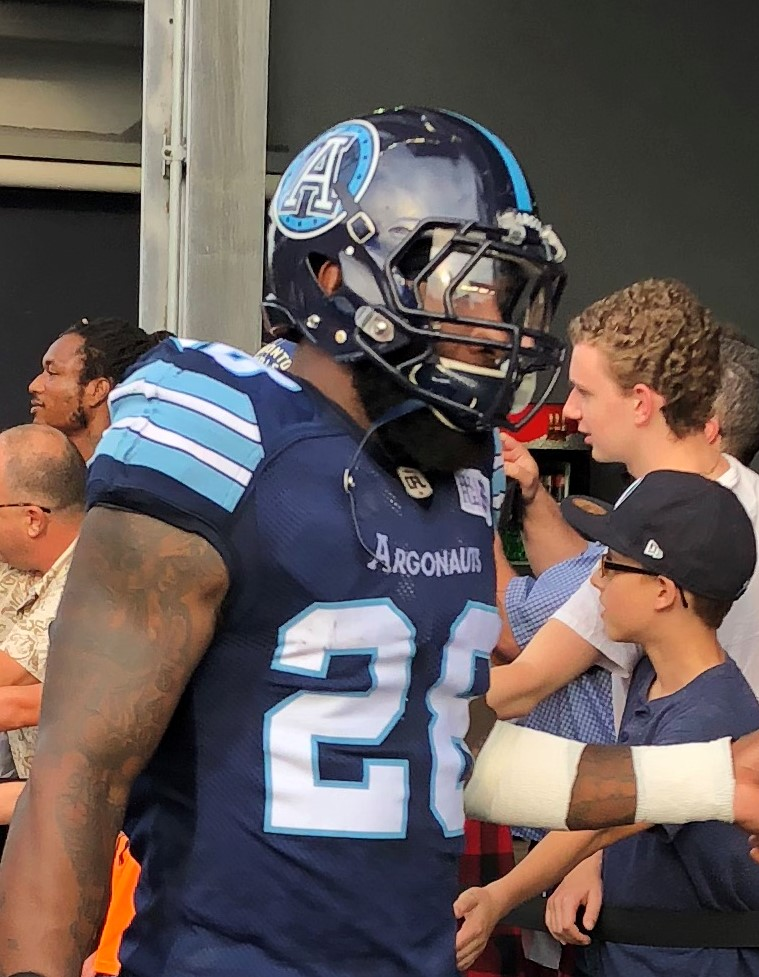
- Jordan with the Toronto Argonauts in 2018

No. 54, 55, 56
- Position: Linebacker

Personal information
- Born: August 17, 1985 (age 41); Harrisonburg, Virginia, U.S.
- Listed height: 6 ft 1 in (1.85 m)
- Listed weight: 226 lb (103 kg)

Career information
- High school: Harrisonburg
- College: James Madison
- NFL draft: 2007: undrafted

Career history
- Philadelphia Eagles (2007–2012); Kansas City Chiefs (2013); Washington Redskins (2014); Toronto Argonauts (2017–2018)

Awards and highlights
- 105th Grey Cup champion; First-team All-American (2006); 2× All-CAA (2005–2006); CAA Defensive Player of the Year (2006)

Career NFL statistics
- Total tackles: 332
- Sacks: 1.0
- Forced fumbles: 4
- Fumble recoveries: 2
- Interceptions: 2
- Stats at Pro Football Reference

Akeem Raphael Jordan (born August 17, 1985) is an American former professional football player who was a linebacker in the National Football League (NFL) and Canadian Football League (CFL). He was signed by the Philadelphia Eagles as an undrafted free agent in 2007. He also played for the Kansas City Chiefs, Washington Redskins, and Toronto Argonauts. He played college football for the James Madison Dukes.

== Early life ==
Jordan attended Harrisonburg High School in Virginia. While there, he played high school football. In 2001, he was named the Virginia Group AA Player of the Year after leading his team to a state title. He earned first-team all-state honors in 2002 as a senior defensive back, and second-team honors as a running back.

== College career ==
Jordan played college football at James Madison University, where he was a member of the 2004 national championship team which defeated the University of Montana to win the title. He was named the Colonial Athletic Association Football Conference Defensive Player of the Year in 2006 after posting 140 tackles including 17 tackles for a loss, 5.5 sacks, one forced fumble, and one fumble recovery. He finished third in voting for the 2006 Dudley Award, which is given annually to the best college football player in Virginia, behind Vince Hall and Chris Long. Jordan was named to the American Football Coaches Association Division I-AA Coaches' All-America Team in 2006. He finished second in voting for the Buck Buchanan Award, which is given to the best defensive player in Division I FCS. He was named the Virginia Defensive Player of the Year following the season as well. In his career as a Duke, he appeared in 50 games (26 starts) and made 299 tackles and 7.5 sacks. He graduated from James Madison in 2007.

== Professional career ==
=== Philadelphia Eagles ===
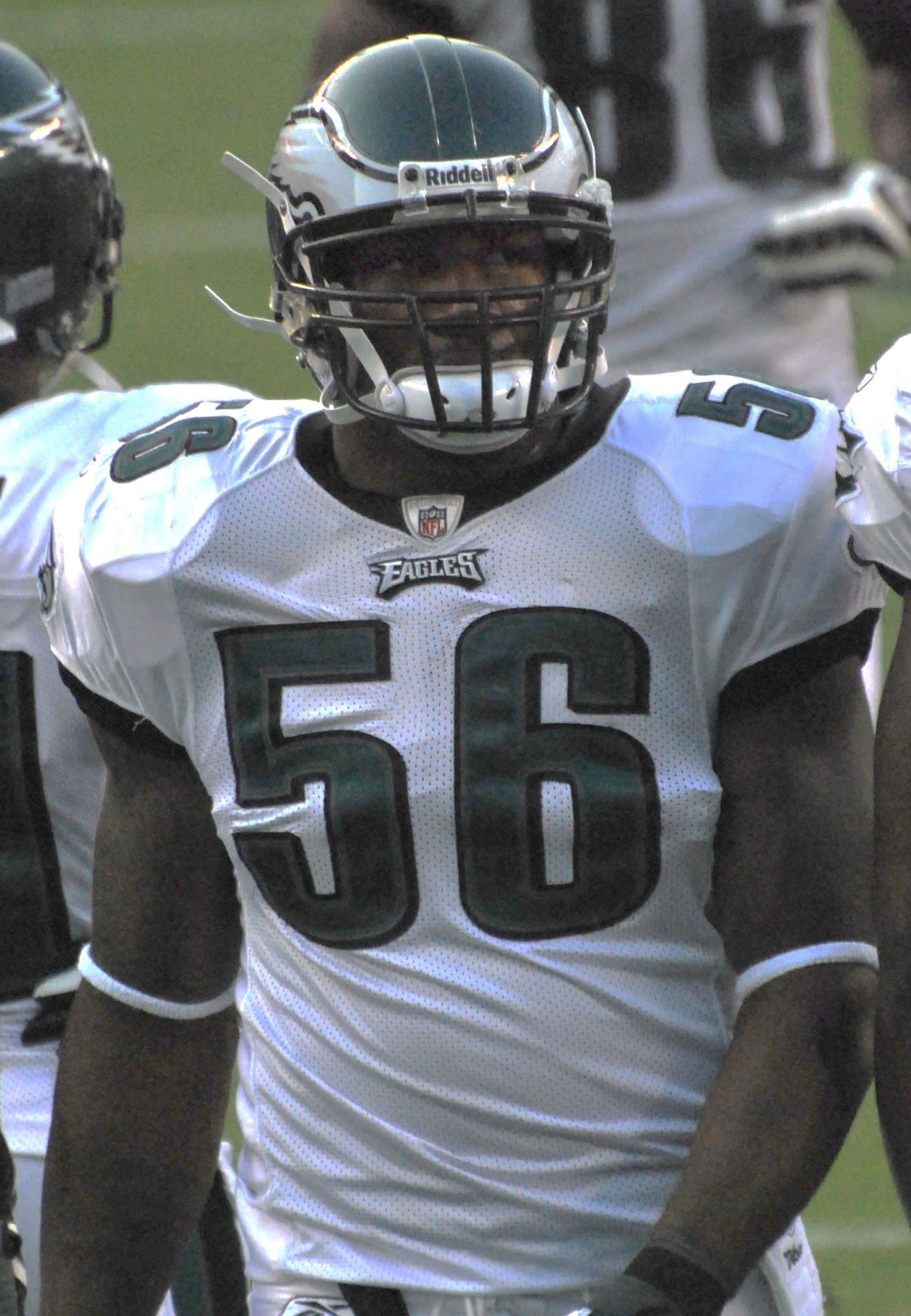
Jordan with the Philadelphia Eagles.

Signed as an undrafted free agent by the Philadelphia Eagles in 2007, Jordan played in all preseason games and led the team in tackles when the preseason was over. He made the final cuts when the Eagles had to come down to the 53-man roster, but was cut and signed to the practice squad the next day when the Eagles picked up two free agents. On October 29, 2007, the Eagles cut linebacker Matt McCoy and called up Jordan from the practice squad. He made his NFL debut later that week, playing special teams against the Dallas Cowboys. Jordan made his first NFL start in week 17 of the 2007 season at weakside linebacker against the Buffalo Bills after Takeo Spikes was placed on injured reserve. He recorded 14 tackles in the game. He played in nine games as a rookie and finished fourth in special teams productions.

Jordan began the 2008 season as the backup weakside linebacker to Omar Gaither, playing mostly on special teams. In a week 12 game against the Baltimore Ravens, Jordan replaced Gaither at weakside linebacker. Jordan led the team with nine tackles in the game. He kept the starting weakside linebacker job for the remainder of the season. The next week against the Arizona Cardinals on Thanksgiving night, Jordan recovered his first career fumble. He recorded 10 tackles in a week 16 loss to the Washington Redskins.

Jordan beat out Gaither for the starting right outside linebacker job before the 2009 season. Jordan made an interception in each of the first two weeks of the season. He missed four straight games after suffering a hyperextended knee in a week 9 game against the Dallas Cowboys. He rotated with Jeremiah Trotter at middle linebacker upon his return. Jordan made two starts at middle linebacker. Jordan finished the season with 82 tackles in ten starts.

Jordan was re-signed to a one-year restricted free agent tender on March 22, 2010. He beat out Moise Fokou for the starting strongside linebacker job in the preseason, but was replaced by Fokou after starting the first four games of the season.

Jordan was not offered a tender following the 2010 season. He was re-signed to a one-year contract on July 30, 2011. He was re-signed again to a two-year contract on September 6.

=== Kansas City Chiefs ===
Jordan agreed to terms on a one-year deal with the Kansas City Chiefs on April 13, 2013, reuniting him with former head coach Andy Reid.

=== Washington Redskins ===
Jordan signed with the Washington Redskins on March 19, 2014. He was placed on the active roster on October 18, 2014. On November 25, the Redskins waived him off their injured reserve.

=== Toronto Argonauts ===
On September 12, 2017, Jordan signed with the Toronto Argonauts of the Canadian Football League. Jordan made his debut on October 7, 2017 against the Saskatchewan Roughriders and made 10 tackles. Jordan played in 4 games in 2017, and played in 15 games in 2018. After receiving an extension prior to free agency opening, Jordan was released following the 2019 preseason. In 19 regular season games with the Argos, Jordan produced 41 tackles, 9 special teams tackles, and a forced fumble.

== NFL career statistics ==
Legend
**Bold**	Career high

=== Regular season ===
Year	Team	Games		Tackles					Interceptions					Fumbles			
Year	Team	GP	GS	Cmb	Solo	Ast	Sck	TFL	Int	Yds	TD	Lng	PD	FF	FR	Yds	TD
2007	PHI	9	1	20	17	3	0.0	2	0	0	0	0	0	0	0	0	0
2008	PHI	**16**	6	62	53	9	0.0	**7**	0	0	0	0	0	0	**2**	0	0
2009	PHI	12	**10**	**71**	**60**	11	**1.0**	5	**2**	**14**	0	**11**	**6**	0	0	0	0
2010	PHI	**16**	3	26	22	4	0.0	2	0	0	0	0	1	0	0	0	0
2011	PHI	15	7	40	32	8	0.0	1	0	0	0	0	0	0	0	0	0
2012	PHI	14	7	45	36	9	0.0	4	0	0	0	0	0	**2**	0	0	0
2013	KAN	**16**	**10**	67	54	**13**	0.0	3	0	0	0	0	0	**2**	0	0	0
2014	WAS	2	0	1	0	1	0.0	0	0	0	0	0	0	0	0	0	0
		100	44	332	274	58	1.0	24	2	14	0	11	7	4	2	0	0

=== Playoffs ===
Year	Team	Games		Tackles					Interceptions					Fumbles			
Year	Team	GP	GS	Cmb	Solo	Ast	Sck	TFL	Int	Yds	TD	Lng	PD	FF	FR	Yds	TD
2008	PHI	**3**	**3**	**13**	**8**	**5**	0.0	0	0	0	0	0	0	0	0	0	0
2009	PHI	1	0	4	3	1	0.0	0	0	0	0	0	0	0	0	0	0
2010	PHI	1	0	0	0	0	0.0	0	0	0	0	0	0	0	0	0	0
2013	KAN	1	0	0	0	0	0.0	0	0	0	0	0	0	0	0	0	0
		6	3	17	11	6	0.0	0	0	0	0	0	0	0	0	0	0

== Personal life ==
Jordan and two of his James Madison teammates were charged with assault and battery by a teammate in February 2006. The teammate dropped the charges on March 20, 2006, but gave no reason for doing so. Jordan was arrested and served with a citizen-obtained warrant for misdemeanor assault and battery in Harrisonburg, Virginia, on June 19, 2011.
