= Elkton, Virginia =

- Town
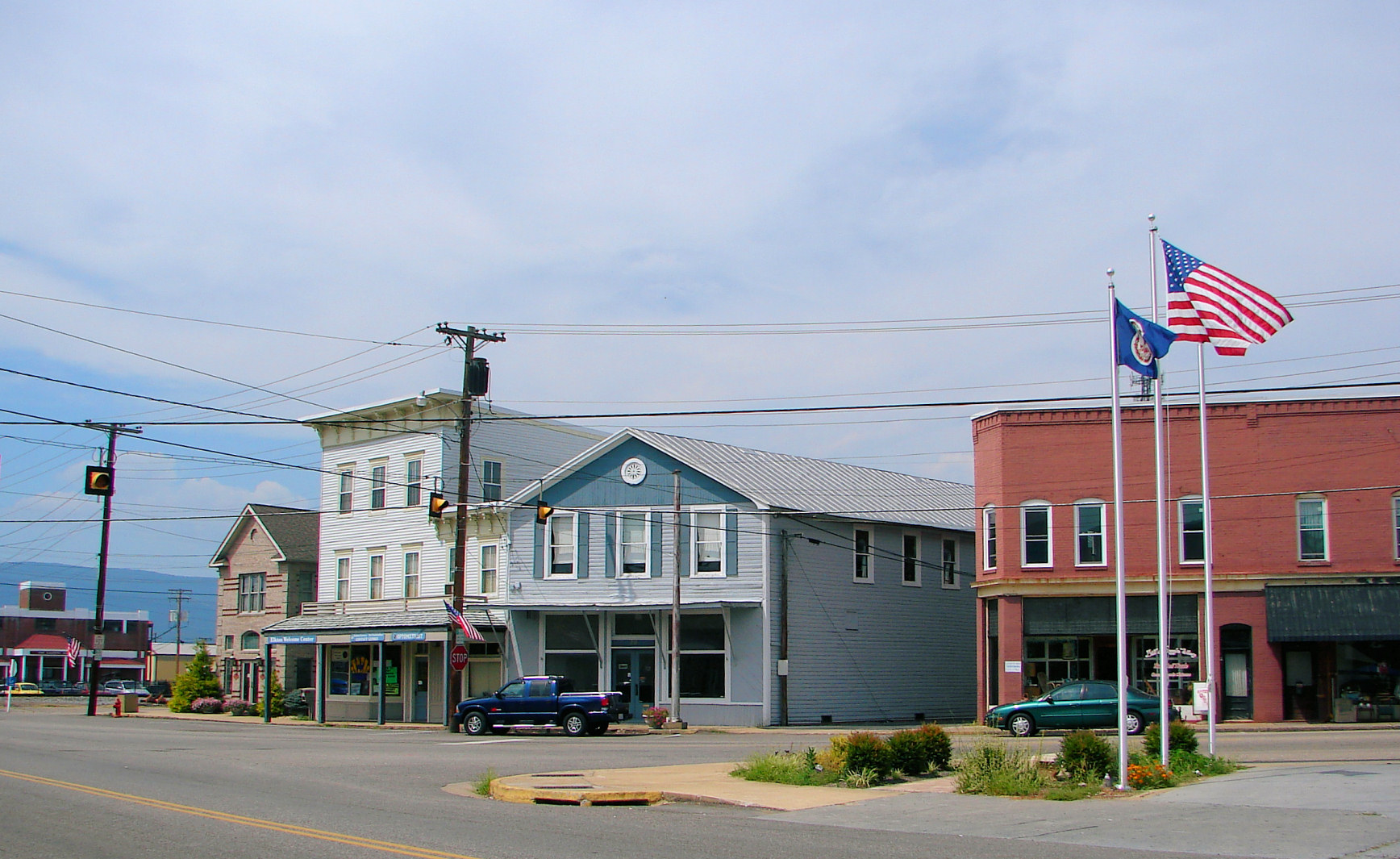

- Flag Logo
- Nickname: Conrad's Store
- Motto: The First Permanent Settlement West of the Blue Ridge Mountains.
- Location of Elkton within Rockingham County

- Location in Virginia Elkton, Virginia (the United States)
- Coordinates: 38°24′30″N 78°37′13″W
- Country: United States
- State: Virginia
- County: Rockingham

Government
  - Type: Council Manager

Area
  - Total: 3.21 sq mi (8.31 km^{2})
  - Land: 3.16 sq mi (8.19 km^{2})
  - Water: 0.046 sq mi (0.12 km^{2})
- Elevation: 971 ft (296 m)

Population (2010)
  - Total: 2,941
  - Estimate (2019): 2,903
  - Density: 918.0/sq mi (354.44/km^{2})
- Time zone: UTC−5 (Eastern (EST))
  - Summer (DST): UTC−4 (EDT)
- ZIP Code: 22827
- Area code: 540
- FIPS code: 51-25408
- GNIS feature ID: 1494217
- Website: Official website

Elkton (formerly Conrad's Store) is an incorporated town in Rockingham County, Virginia, United States. It is included in the Harrisonburg metropolitan area. The population was 2,941 at the 2020 census and 2,762 at the 2010 census. Elkton was named for the Elk Run stream.

It is located along the South Fork of the Shenandoah River at the intersections of east–west U.S. Route 33 and north–south U.S. Route 340. The town celebrated its 100th anniversary in 2008.

== History ==
One of the first European-Americans to settle permanently in the area was Adam Miller (Mueller), a native of Germany. In 1741, Miller purchased 820 acres (3.3 km^{2}), including a large lithia spring, near Elkton and lived on this property for the remainder of his life. He sold 280 acres (1.1 km^{2}) of this property to his son-in-law, Jacob Baer, and the spring on Miller’s land is still known as Bear Lithia Spring.

Conrads Store was a general store built by George Conrad about 1812. George Conrad was a son of Captain Stephen Conrad who served during the American Revolution. In 1816, Conrads Store became a United States post office with George Conrad as its first postmaster. During the American Civil War (1861–1865), Conrads Store operated as a Confederate post office. In September 1866, postal service was briefly discontinued at Conrads Store, and intermittently resumed and discontinued over the next decade until 1881 when the name, Elkton, was adopted as the name of new passenger station of the Shenandoah Valley Railroad. In January 1881, Elkton, Virginia was established as a post office. The Town of Elkton was officially incorporated on March 14, 1908.

An important building in the town's history is the Jennings House. Built in 1840 by Dr. Samuel B. Jennings, the house was transformed into a hospital during the Civil War. The historic Jennings House was converted to house the local government. In the Summer of 2016, local government offices & the Elkton Police Department were moved out of the Jennings building in favor of the Elkton Area Community Center. On December 11, 2020, the Jennings House was opened as the Elkton Town Hall after a nearly 8 month restoration process to restore the home and add modern amenities like updated electric, plumbing, HVAC, ADA compliant restrooms, and a wheelchair lift. The town Christmas tree can be found across the street from the house.

Located on Rockingham Street, the Miller-Kite House was the headquarters of General Stonewall Jackson at the start of the Shenandoah Valley Campaign during the Civil War. Now the house is a town landmark and museum, housing many items from the war and some of Jackson's personal belongings. In one of the second-story windows a cardboard cutout of the General watches the street. Many visitors report stories of ghosts or unusual behavior while in the house.

In addition to the Miller-Kite House, Bon Air and the Kite Mansion are listed on the National Register of Historic Places.

== Geography ==
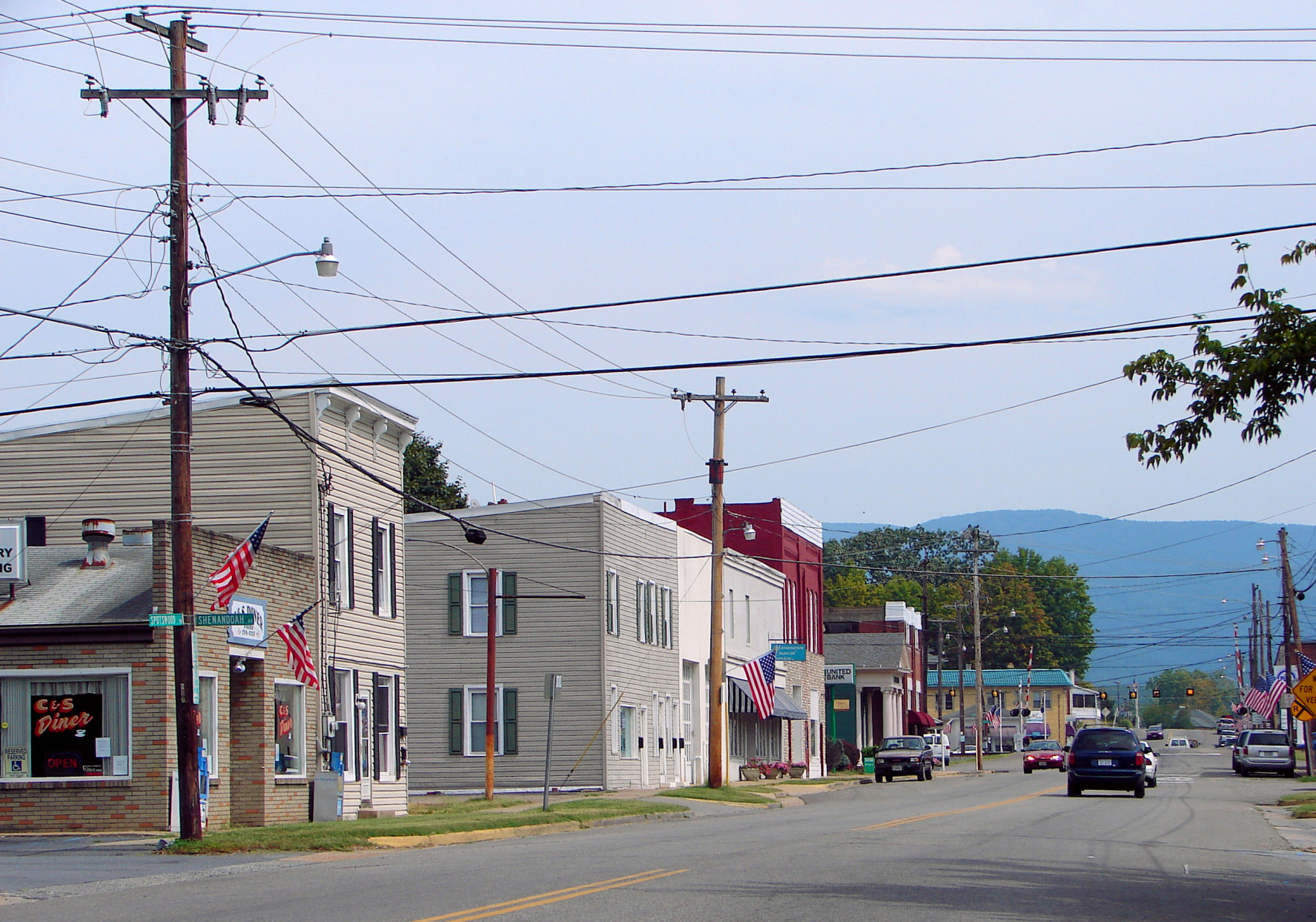
Elkton with the Blue Ridge Mountains in the background

Elkton is located at 38°24′30″N 78°37′13″W (38.408298, −78.620321). It is located on the northeast portion of Rockingham County, Virginia. Elkton is bordered by Page County to the north, the Blue Ridge Mountains to the east, the Massanutten Mountain range to the west, and the Merck manufacturing plant and MillerCoors brewery and distribution center to the south. Norfolk Southern's Virginia Division's rail line, Route 33, and the South Fork of the Shenandoah River all cut through the town. The general area is agricultural, filled with farm lands and rural scenes.

According to the United States Census Bureau, the town has a total area of 1.4 square miles (3.6 km^{2}), of which 1.4 square miles (3.5 km^{2}) is land and 0.04 square mile (0.1 km^{2}) (1.43%) is water.

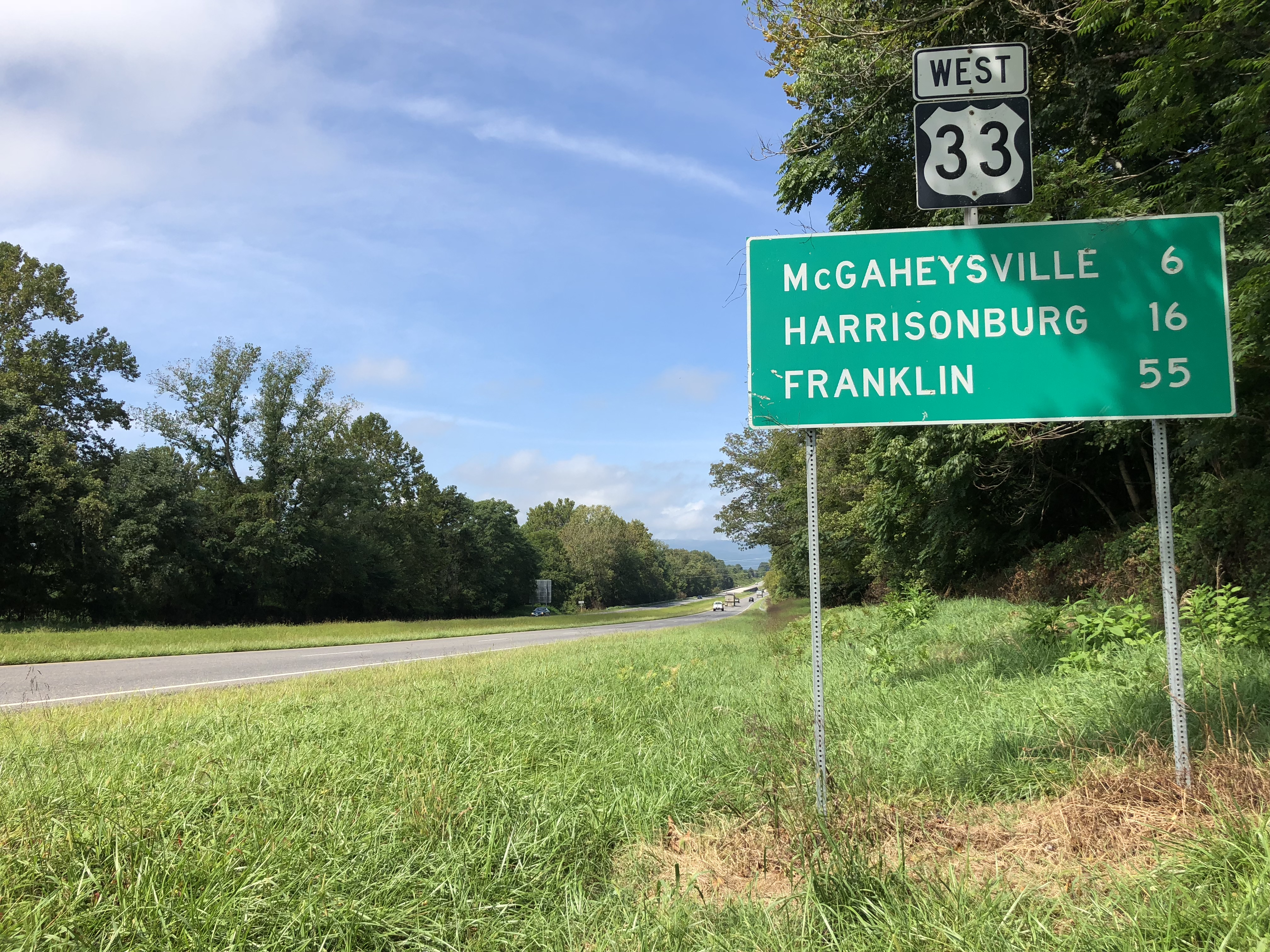
US 33 is the largest and busiest road in Elkton

== Transportation ==
The main roads providing access to Elkton are U.S. Route 33 and U.S. Route 340. US 33 was realigned, and the old alignment through downtown Elkton is now US 33 Business.

== Demographics ==
Historical population
Census	Pop.	Note	%±
1910	873		—
1920	905		3.7%
1930	965		6.6%
1940	1,050		8.8%
1950	1,361		29.6%
1960	1,506		10.7%
1970	1,511		0.3%
1980	1,520		0.6%
1990	1,935		27.3%
2000	2,042		5.5%
2010	2,726		33.5%
2020	2,941		7.9%
U.S. Decennial Census

As of the census of 2010, there were 2,762 people, 862 households, and 555 families residing in the town. The population density was 1,485.4 people per square mile (575.5/km^{2}). There were 919 housing units at an average density of 668.5 per square mile (259.0/km^{2}). The racial makeup of the town was 95.49% White, 2.74% African American, 0.15% Native American, 0.24% Asian, 0.05% from other races, and 1.32% from two or more races. Hispanic or Latino of any race were 1.81% of the population.

Major ancestry groups reported by Elkton residents include: United States or American - 23.9%, German - 15.3%, English - 8.4%, Irish - 6.9%, Scotch-Irish - 4.6%, Dutch - 2.3%, Scottish - 2.2%, Norwegian - 1.2%, French - 1.6%, Welsh - 1.1%, Italian - 0.8%, Polish - 0.9%, French Canadian - 0.3%, Hungarian - 0.2%, Russian - 0.2%, Slovak - 0.2%, West Indian (excluding Hispanic groups) - 0.2%, Other ancestries - 12.1%.

There were 862 households, out of which 28.3% had children under the age of 18 living with them, 47.9% were married couples living together, 11.0% had a female householder with no husband present, and 35.5% were non-families. 28.7% of all households were made up of individuals, and 11.3% had someone living alone who was 65 years of age or older. The average household size was 2.34 and the average family size was 2.86.

In the town, the population was spread out, with 22.9% under the age of 18, 9.2% from 18 to 24, 30.6% from 25 to 44, 22.4% from 45 to 64, and 14.9% who were 65 years of age or older. The median age was 37 years. For every 100 females, there were 89.4 males. For every 100 females age 18 and over, there were 88.1 males.

The median income for a household in the town was $35,556, and the median income for a family was $41,500. Males had a median income of $30,032 versus $21,996 for females. The per capita income for the town was $17,192. About 4.7% of families and 6.8% of the population were below the poverty line, including 9.4% of those under age 18 and 7.7% of those age 65 or over.

== Education ==
Although incorporated towns may operate their own schools under Virginia law, Elkton area schools are operated by Rockingham County Public Schools, a Virginia public school division.

Elkton houses three public schools: Elkton Elementary School, Elkton Middle School, and East Rockingham High School. Elkton Elementary School was built in 1938 on West B Street to house Elkton High School, but its role changed when a new school was built. Elkton Middle School was originally Elkton High School, built in 1957 primarily for grades eight through twelve. Additions were built to the high school in 1967, building a ten-room annex for more classes; and the elementary school in 1972, replacing part of the original building. In 1980, a new high school, Spotswood Senior High School (now Spotswood High School), was built for eastern Rockingham County, Virginia, combining Montevideo and Elkton High Schools. The new school, located in Penn Laird, Virginia and literally on the Massanutten Mountain, housed grades 10-12. Ninth grade was added for the 1984-85 school year. Over the years, Elkton Elementary added programs such as Head Start for preschoolers. In the 1990s a baseball field, used for Elkton softball teams, was built next to the middle school. In the late 1990s, renovations were done to Elkton Elementary School, as well as the addition of a new playground was built specifically for the lower grades. In 2001, more construction took place as the old playground, with original wooden trucks and sharp metal edges, was replaced by softer and brighter rounded metallic structures. In 2005, more renovations were done to Elkton Middle School, such as changing the old band room into an addition to the cafeteria, building a new computer lab, and adding another gym separate from the main for public use, such as the Elkton Recreation League Basketball teams. In 2006 the fifth grade was moved from Elkton Elementary School to the middle school because of the extra space made by the renovations made in 2005. In 2010 the fifth grade was moved back to the elementary school.

In 2010, the County Board of Education opened a new high school for the eastern Rockingham area, East Rockingham High School, located in Solsburg beside River Bend Elementary School. Its attendance district encompasses the Elkton, McGaheysville, River Bend, and South River elementary school districts.

== Events ==
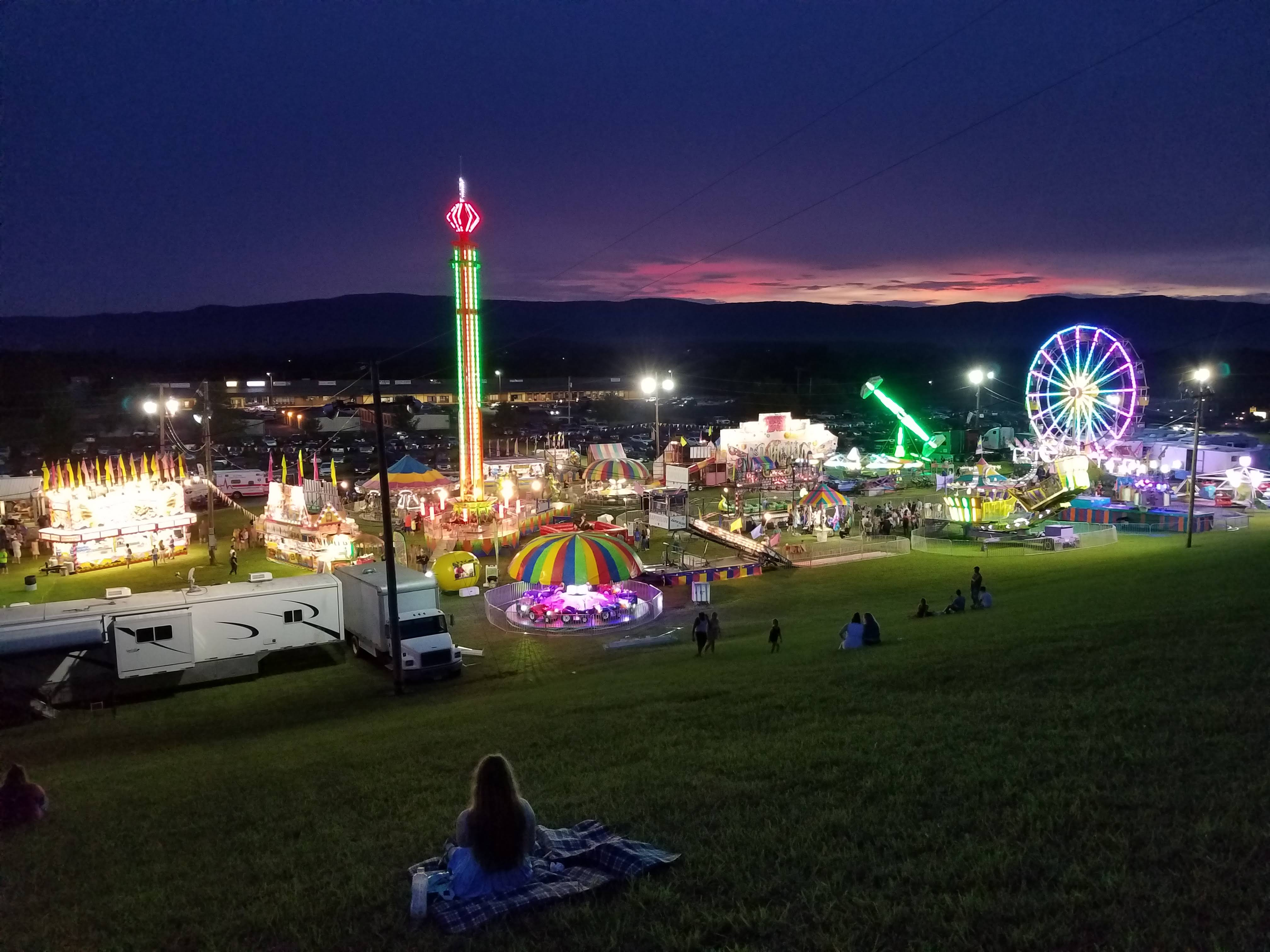
Elkton Field Day, July 4, 2018

Since 1908, the town has held a carnival called Elkton Field Day. It is held in early July and features rides, good food, yard sales, live bluegrass music, fireworks, and a greased pole climbing contest in which contestants try to retrieve prize money at the top of the 25 foot pole covered in hand soap. The event is sponsored by the Junior Order of the United American Mechanics in Elkton. The group gives out scholarships and help for those in need.

== Sports ==
The town has a team in the Rockingham County Baseball League called the Elkton Blue Sox.
