= Rockingham County Public Schools =

School district in Virginia, United States

Rockingham County Public Schools is the public school district in Rockingham County in the U.S. state of Virginia.

== General information ==
- RCPS has received nearly $2 million in 21st Century Community Learning Centers grants from the U.S. and VA Depts. of Education to operate before- and after-school programs at five elementary schools in cooperation with Boys & Girls Clubs of Harrisonburg and Rockingham County.
- The four high schools offer students a variety of opportunities to earn college credit while in high school, including dual enrollment classes, as well as Advanced Placement (AP) classes in all major content areas.
- All high schools offer alternative education programs for at-risk students.
- All high schools have multi-purpose computer labs that remain open to students until 5:30 p.m., Monday through Thursday, during the school year.
- A Smaller Learning Communities grant for $300,000 was received from the U.S. Dept. of Education to improve programs such as middle to high school transition.
- The Character Counts program has been implemented in all elementary, middle and high schools.
- RCPS has over 4,000 computers, which are deployed in every classroom, office, library, and computer lab. Middle school students take two year-long computer technologycourses.
- The Career Cluster Program provides a focused program to assist participating students with a seamless transition from school to work. RCPS is supported privately by the Rockingham Educational Foundation, Inc. During the 2006–2007 school year, the Foundation will contribute approximately $75,000 in support of a variety of school initiatives and student scholarships.
- The Rockingham Educational Foundation provides a Teacher Supply Depot for classroom teachers. The Depot is a warehouse where teachers can select hundreds of free items for classroom usage.
- Summer Science Camps are conducted at all elementary schools through a contribution from Merck & Company, Inc. to the Rockingham Educational Foundation, Inc.
- The three high schools collaboratively publish a monthly community newspaper called, etc... It has a circulation of about 30,000.
- During 2005–2006, 3,524 parents, college and high school students, business people, members of civic groups, and others volunteered in our schools. They donated over 113,786 hours of service.
- All teachers are required to possess eight Technology Standards for Instructional Personnel.
- Many teachers have achieved certification based on the National Educational Technology Standards for Teachers.
- Over 37% of Rockingham County teachers have master's degrees.
- Elementary and middle schools provide after-school tutoring and homework assistance.
- Each high school sponsors a Future Educators Association and teaching mentorships for credit.

== Schools ==
=== High schools ===
- Turner Ashby High School
- Broadway High School
- East Rockingham High School
- Spotswood High School

=== Middle schools ===
- Elkton Middle School
- J. Frank Hillyard Middle School
- Montevideo Middle School
- Wilbur S. Pence Middle School

=== Elementary schools ===
- Cub Run Elementary School
- Elkton Elementary School
- Fulks Run Elementary School
- Lacey Springs Elementary School
- Linville-Edom Elementary School
- McGaheysville Elementary School
- Mountain View Elementary School
- John C. Myers Elementary School
- Ottobine Elementary School
- Peak View Elementary School
- Plains Elementary School
- Pleasant Valley Elementary School
- River Bend Elementary School
- South River Elementary School
- John Wayland Elementary School

=== Other schools ===
- Massanutten Technical Center
- Rockingham Academy

== Awards ==
- Rockingham County Public Schools is one of only 24 school divisions in Virginia which met or exceeded No Child Left Behind Act (NCLB) achievement objectives during the 2005–2006 school year. Rockingham County was one of the largest school divisions on this elite list.
- Congressman Bob Goodlatte recognized Montevideo Middle School Instructional Technology Resource Teacher Joe Showker with a Children's Champion Award for his work with the Web Wise Kids (WWK) program throughout Virginia.
- The newest grant news would be for our Title I school that were recognized as Distinguished Title I Schools and received Academic Achievement grants. Fulks Run and South River Elementary Schools each received $17,000 for the past two years of SOL Assessment achievement. Pleasant Valley and Mountain View Elementary Schools received $8,500 each for their students' SOL Assessment achievement.
- RCPS teacher, Janis Churchill, was selected as the outstanding elementary school technology teacher in Virginia by the International Society for Technology in Education Association.
- For their work during the 2005–2006 school year, numerous RCPS teachers received Shenandoah Valley Economics Awards, and many of those teachers received state-level recognition.
- J. Frank Hillyard Middle School teacher, Allen Ruliffson won the Virginia Economic Teacher of the Year Award.
- High school agriculture, business, family and consumer sciences, health sciences, marketing, technology, and trade and industrial students competed in regional, state, and national level competitions, receiving numerous individual and team awards. Students served as regional and state officers of their career and technical education youth organizations. Annually, RCPS middle and high school students win scholarships from the State Fair of Virginia and other agencies as a result of their participation in career and technical programs.
- The Spotswood High School Chapter of the Future Educators of America (FEA) received an invitation to present at the 2007 National Conference for FEA.
- Rockingham County employs 11 teachers that have earned certification as master teachers by the National Board of Professional Teaching Standards.
