= Harrisonburg City Public Schools =

School district in Harrisonburg, Virginia, US

Location
- Harrisonburg, VA

District information
- Superintendent: Dr. Michael G. Richards
- Schools: 13
- Budget: $110,000,000

Students and staff
- Students: 6500
- Staff: 1250

Other information
- Website: https://www.harrisonburg.k12.va.us/

Harrisonburg City Public Schools is a public school division in Harrisonburg, Virginia, United States. The division includes two high schools (Harrisonburg High School) and (Rocktown High School), two middle schools (Thomas Harrison Middle School, Skyline Middle School), six elementary schools (W.H. Keister Elementary School, Smithland Elementary School, Spotswood Elementary School, Stone Spring Elementary School, Waterman Elementary School, and Bluestone Elementary School), Elon Rhodes Early Learning Center and a vocational school, Massanutten Technical Center. The school division is led by Division Superintendent Dr. Michael G. Richards. Dr. Richards was appointed Superintendent in May 2019.

== Enrollment ==
More than 6,400 students are enrolled in HCPS, and of these more than 40% are English language learners (English as a Second Language, ESL), making the school system one of the most diverse in the state of Virginia. The top foreign languages spoken by students are Spanish, Tigrinya, and Kurdish. More than 70 languages are spoken by students.

== History ==
In the early 2000s, controversy surrounded the construction of a new high school as well as the use of the old building. Initial discussions indicated the old building was to become a 5th and 6th grade intermediate school. However, in March 2005, the school board voted to turn the old high school property over to the city. This allowed Harrisonburg City Council to enter into a five-year $7.5 million lease of the old high school property (building, athletic fields, and parking lots) to James Madison University in July 2005. The agreement included an option to purchase the property, which JMU capitalized on, in May 2006, with an offer to purchase the property at $17 million. In June 2006, the sale was approved by the city council, as a method of funding street improvements and a new school.

Construction of Skyline Middle School And Smithland Elementary was completed in 2008. The schools are distinctly separate student bodies, but are located within one physically consolidated building. The fifth grade is located on the middle school side in the central connecting hallway, to allow the fifth grade to return to the elementary student body - should the school system decide to change grade configuration.

=== School Configuration Discussion of 2005 ===
At the June 21, 2005 School Board meeting Dr. Ford, school superintendent, presented to the board for discussion whether when a new combined elementary school/middle school is opened it should open as a K-4; 5-8 or a K-5; 6-8 configuration. The issues are:

1. Making that decision up front will have implications for actual design and construction of the facility.
2. The preferred configuration of staff and community based on past discussions and present practice is K-5, 6-8 but retaining that configuration in the future would require construction of another elementary school (perhaps an additional $13–15 million in construction costs). Construction of the combined facility and either initial or ultimate use of it as a K-4, 5-8, along with changing other elementary schools in the city to K-4 and Thomas Harrison Middle School to 5-8 would utilize the new combined school and existing schools in a way that would not require building an additional elementary school.
3. The question that had been previously raised by board members was whether it would be better to do an initial redistricting for the new combined school and keep the K-5; 6-8 configuration as long as possible after it opens, and then when elementary schools become crowded, change to a K-4; 5-8 and redistrict again; or would it be better to make the change to K-4, 5-8 division-wide when the new school opens and thus avoid having to redistrict again. Of course, at any point in the future redistricting might be necessary due to population shifts in the city regardless of grade configuration choices.

School board member Kerri Wilson proposed that the board consider an alternative to the above. Her proposal is to make the four current elementary schools K-3 schools, using Thomas Harrison Middle School as a division-wide 4-5 school. And instead of building a combined school, build a new 6-8 middle school for the city. K-3 students would attend existing elementary schools and the size of each school would eventually be 400-450; 4th and 5th grade students would be educated in a single school facility at Thomas Harrison and the enrollment there would eventually be 850-900; and grades 6 to 8 would at "build out" be in a single school of 1300-1400 students. Each school would, of course, begin with smaller numbers than those listed above since there are about 325 students per grade level currently division-wide. Mrs. Wilson discussed her reasons for her proposal and agreed to send to the board her list of advantages for this configuration.

=== Construction of Second High School ===
In May 2019, Harrisonburg City Public Schools initiated a two phase process of Programming and Design for a second high school, with a targeted opening of Fall 2022. Due to the Coronavirus Pandemic, the School Board and the City Council agreed to pause construction for one year, making the projected opening date fall of 2023.

== Schools ==
=== Elementary schools ===
HCPS elementary schools serve kindergarten through fifth grade.

- Bluestone Elementary School
- W. H. Keister Elementary School
- Smithland Elementary School
- Spotswood Elementary School
- Stone Spring Elementary School
- Waterman Elementary School

=== Middle schools ===
HCPS middle schools serve grades six through eight.

- Thomas Harrison Middle School
- Skyline Middle School

=== High schools ===
- Harrisonburg High School
- Rocktown High School

=== Technical/other schools ===
- Elon Rhodes Early Learning Center
- Massanutten Technical Center
- Massanutten Regional Governors School
