= Turner Ashby High School =

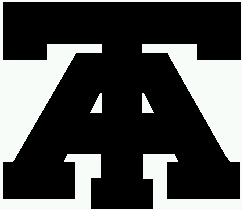

Location
- 800 North Main Street; Bridgewater, VA 22812; United States; 38°23′50.6″N 78°57′27.6″W

Information
- School type: Public, high school
- Motto: Be Just and Fear Not
- Established: 1956
- School district: Rockingham County Public Schools
- Superintendent: Oskar Scheikl
- Principal: Chris Noll
- Faculty: 147
- Grades: 9–12
- Enrollment: 1,082 (2016-17)
- Student to teacher ratio: 13:1
- Campus: Rural
- Colors: Black, silver, and white
- Athletics conference: VHSL Group 3A West Region; Valley Region
- Mascot: Knight
- Rival: Harrisonburg High School
- Yearbook: Crag
- Website: tahs.rockingham.k12.va.us/o/tahs

Turner Ashby High School is located in Bridgewater, Virginia in the Rockingham County Public School district.

== History ==
When Turner Ashby High School opened in the fall of 1956, it became the third consolidated high school in Rockingham County. Schools consolidated were Bridgewater, Dayton, and Mt. Clinton. The original Turner Ashby building was located on a twenty-acre plot on the north side of Dayton, and now serves grades six through eight as Wilbur S. Pence Middle School.

The name Turner Ashby High School was selected by the Rockingham County School Board as an act of Massive Resistance against school desegregation (see Davis v. County School Board of Prince Edward County).The Ashby District was named for Confederate officer Turner Ashby, a native of Fauquier County, who prior to the war led a violent mob in attacking Clarke County Virginia farmer John C. Underwood for speaking against slavery. Ashby's political connections forced Stonewall Jackson to promote him to cavalry commander during the first year of the American Civil War. Ashby was killed in battle near Harrisonburg just prior to Jackson's victories at Cross Keys and Port Republic and the culmination of the 1862 Valley Campaign.

The original building was designed and constructed for grades eight through twelve. The approximate cost of the school was $1,000,000.00. Classroom additions were added in 1960 and 1962. Mobile units were added for classroom use in 1973, 1975, and 1980. Also, beginning in 1966, Rockingham County School desegregated for the first time, and the eighth grade was moved to the John Wayland Intermediate School, now John Wayland Elementary School.

Turner Ashby High School moved into a new facility on Route 42 north of Bridgewater in the fall of 1989. The new facility, including site development, furnishings, building, etc. was built for approximately $15,300,000.00.

This modern facility has more cafeteria, music, athletic, storage, and classroom areas designed to serve up to 1200 students. Three mobile units were added for classroom use in 1998, and five more were added in 2000.

During the 2001-2002 school year and the following summer, a new wing was added to the 1989 building. This addition added more than twenty new classrooms including four new science rooms and another general purpose computer lab. Along with the addition of the new wing, the library was expanded and a girls’ team room was added.

== Principals ==
- F. N. Postlethwait - 1956-1961
- W. Carl Yowell - 1961-1964
- E. Cameron Miller - 1964-1969
- Samuel Ritchie - 1969-1992
- Michael Loso - 1992-1997
- Delmer Botkin - 1997-2005
- Steven Walk - 2005–2015
- Phil Judd - 2015–2022
- Chris Noll - 2022–present

== Competitive titles ==
=== Sports titles ===
- 1968 State II Boys’ Track & Field
- 1968 State II Boys' Basketball
- 1971 State AA Baseball
- 1974 State AA Baseball
- 1975 State AA Baseball
- 1985 State AA Girls' Volleyball
- 1998 State AA Girls' Basketball
- 1999 State AA Girls' Basketball
- 2000 State AA Cheerleading
- 2002 State AA Baseball
- 2004 State AA Softball
- 2005 State AA Division III Football
- 2006 State AA Baseball
- 2007 State AA Baseball
- 2015 State AA Girls' Basketball
- 2017 State 3A Baseball

=== Marching band titles ===
- 2004 Class A James Madison University Parade of Champions
- 2007 Class A James Madison University Parade of Champions
- 2017 Class A James Madison University Parade of Champions

=== Drama titles ===
- 2017 1st Place Technical Olympics at Virginia Theatre Association Conference
- 2016 1st Place VHSL 3A State Championship One Act Play "Peter/Wendy"
- 2016 3A State Outstanding Performance Award for Gino Stickley and Blaire Sharman
- 2016 All Star Cast Award for Gino Stickley One Act Play "Peter/Wendy" at Virginia Theatre Association Conference
- 2016 Distinguishable Technical Merit Award One Act Play "Peter/Wendy" at Virginia Theatre Association Conference
- 2016 Honorable Mention One Act Play "Peter/Wendy" at Virginia Theatre Association Conference
- 2016 3A West Regional Outstanding Performance Award for Gino Stickley
- 2016 1st Place 3A West Regional Competition One Act Play "Peter/Wendy"
- 2016 Conference 29 Outstanding Performance Award for Gino Stickley, Blaire Sharman, and Brad Ridder
- 2016 1st Place Conference 29 Competition One Act Play "Peter/Wendy"
- 2015 Conference 29 Outstanding Performance Award for Blaire Sharman, Gino Stickley, and Wyatt Coggins
- 2015 2nd Place Conference 29 Competition One Act Play "The Great Choice"
- 2012 competed at Southeastern Theatre Conference (representing the state of Virginia) "Anatomy of Gray" All Superior Ratings
- 2011 1st Place VHSL State Championship "Anatomy of Gray"
- State All Star Cast Awards: Megan Clinedinst and Andrew Raines
- 2011 1st Place Southern Valley Regional Competition One Act Play "Anatomy of Gray"
- 2011 1st Place Massanutten District Competition One Act Play "Anatomy of Gray"
- 2011 1st Place Virginia Theatre Association Conference One Act Competition "Anatomy of Gray"
- 2011 1st Place State Competition One Act Play
- 2010 4th Place State Competition One Act Play
- 2010 1st Place Massanutten Regional Competition One Act Play
- 2010 2nd Place Massanutten District Competition One Act Play
- 2010 Superior Rating at Virginia Theatre Association Conference One Act Competition
- 2009 4th Place State Competition One Act Play
- 2009 1st Place Massanutten Regional Competition One Act Play
- 2009 1st Place Massanutten District Competition One Act Play
- 2009 Superior Rating at Virginia Theatre Association Conference One Act Competition "Alice in Wonderland"
- 2009 All Star Cast Award for Colin McLaughlin at Virginia Theatre Association Conference
- 2009 All Star Cast Award for Lindsey Fitzgerald at Virginia Theatre Association Conference
- 2010 1st Place Massanutten Regional Competition One Act Play "The King Stag"
- 2010 2nd Place Massanutten District Competition One Act Play "The King Stag"
- 2010 Superior Rating at Virginia Theatre Association Conference One Act Competition "The King Stag"
- 2002 1st place VHSL one act competition "Picnic on the Battlefield" directed by Michelle Canada
- 2002 VHSL district competition outstanding Performance by an Actor Douglas "Alan" Diehl
- 2002 1st place forensic duo interp Patrick Tucker and Douglas Diehl
- 2002 VTA All Star Cast Douglas Diehl, Patrick Tucker
- 2000 VHSL 1st place "Echos in the Hallway" written and directed by Joseph Hiney

== Student organizations ==
- Art
- Association for Computing Machinery
- Creative Writing
- Debate
- Distributive Education Clubs of America
- Diversity
- Drama
- Effective School-wide Discipline / Student Connections
- Family, Career and Community Leaders of America
- Forensics
- French
- Future Business Leaders of America
- Future Educators Association
- Future Farmers of America
- NAC
- National Honors Society
- Pre-Medical
- Ruri-Teen
- Technology Student Association
- Tri-M / Musical Heritage Society
- Science
- SkillsUSA
- Spanish
- Sports Medicine
- STARS
- Student Council Association
- Yearbook
- Youth and Government

== Notable alumni ==
- Alan Knicely (Class of 1973) - former MLB player (Houston Astros, Cincinnati Reds, Philadelphia Phillies, St. Louis Cardinals)
- Brian Bocock (Class of 2003) - former Major League Baseball player for the San Francisco Giants, and minor league affiliates for the Philadelphia Phillies, Pittsburgh Pirates, Toronto Blue Jays, and Kansas City Royals
- Brenan Hanifee (Class of 2016) - MLB player for the Detroit Tigers
