= HCP =

HCP may refer to:

== Businesses ==
- HashiCorp (NASDAQ: HCP), an American software company
- Healthpeak Properties (formerly HCP, Inc.), an American investment company
- H. Cegielski – Poznań, a Polish manufacturing company
- Health Consumer Powerhouse, a Swedish think tank
- Highland Capital Partners, a venture capital firm

== Health and medicine ==
- Hereditary coproporphyria
- Himalayan Cataract Project
- Human Connectome Project
- Hydrocephalus, or "water on the brain"
- Haemolysin-coregulated protein, in the Type VI secretion system
- Healthcare proxy
- Healthcare professional

== Chemistry and materials ==
- Hardened cement paste
- Phosphaacetylene
- Hexagonal close-packed arrangement of spheres

== Other uses ==
- Aga Khan Historic Cities Programme
- Habitat Conservation Plan
- Hamiltonian Circuit Problem, in computer science
- Handicap (horse racing), in horse racing
- Harding Charter Preparatory High School, in Oklahoma City, Oklahoma, United States
- Haut Commissariat au Plan in Morocco
- Heritage College, Perth, in Australia
- Hitachi Content Platform, the foundational component of the Hitachi Data Systems cloud architecture
- High card points in contract bridge
- Howrah Police Commissionerate, in West Bengal, India
- Hypnotize Camp Posse, American hip hop music group from Memphis, Tennessee
