= Broadway High School (San Jose, California) =

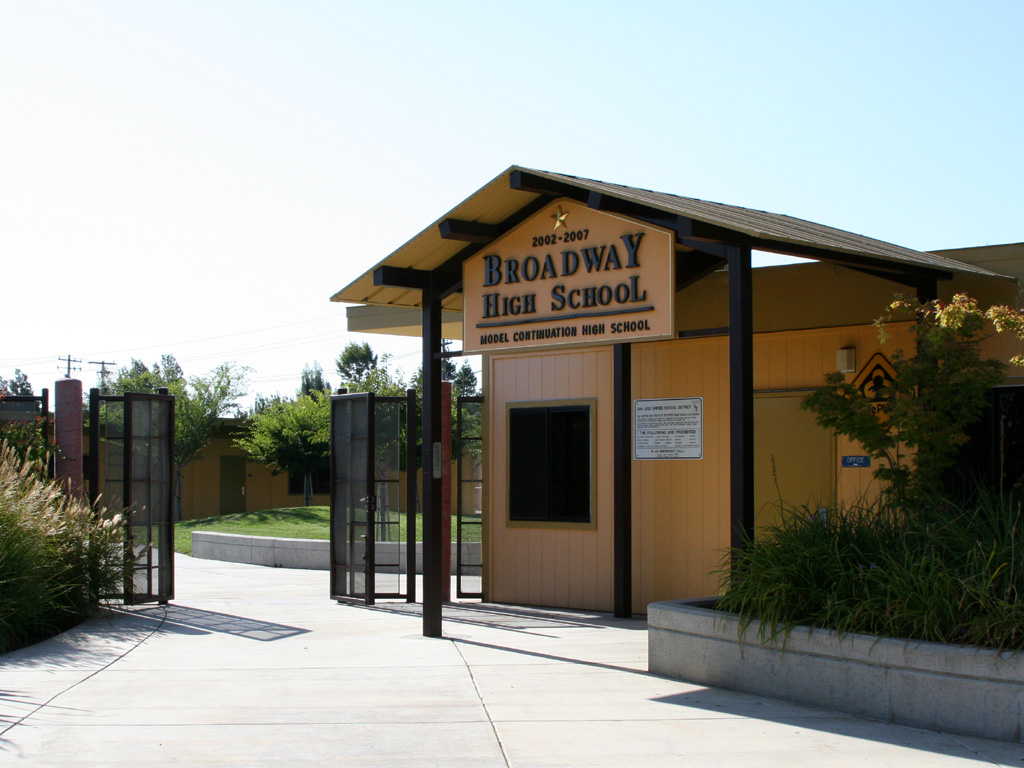

Location
- 4825 Speak Lane; San Jose, California 95118; United States; 37°15′41″N 121°52′48″W

Information
- Established: 1976
- School district: San Jose Unified School District
- Principal: Giovanni Bui
- Teaching staff: 17.90 (FTE)
- Student to teacher ratio: 10.22
- Website: www.sjusd.org/broadway

Broadway High School is an alternative secondary school located in San Jose, California which serves students within the San Jose Unified School District. The school was first opened in 1976.
