= William Monroe High School =

Location
- 254 Monroe Drive; Stanardsville, Greene County, Virginia 22973; United States; 38°17′37″N 78°26′37″W

Information
- Type: Public secondary school
- Established: 1925
- School district: Greene County Public Schools
- NCES District ID: 5101710
- Superintendent: Andrea Whitmarsh
- School code: VA-039-0390072
- CEEB code: 472145
- NCES School ID: 510171000702
- Principal: Kris Wimmer
- Faculty: 65.75 (on an FTE basis)
- Grades: 9–12
- Enrollment: 957 (2022-2023)
  - Grade 9: 258
  - Grade 10: 250
  - Grade 11: 234
  - Grade 12: 215
- Student to teacher ratio: 14.56:1
- Colors: Green, black, and white
- Athletics conference: Valley District
- Nickname: Dragons
- USNWR ranking: 10,347
- Newspaper: The Dragons' Tale
- Yearbook: The Trail Mile
- Website: wmhs.greenecountyschools.com

William Monroe High School is a public secondary school in Stanardsville, Virginia, United States.

== History ==
William Monroe High School is the only public secondary school in Greene County, Virginia. The school's namesake, William Monroe, immigrated to the area from Great Britain in 1749. Monroe's will provided that the interest from his estate be used for the free education of the area youth. When Greene County was formed from Orange County in 1838, the Greene Humane Society was incorporated to administer the portion of the fund allotted to the county.

William Monroe High School was opened in 1925 as a one-story frame building with eight classrooms surrounding an auditorium. In 1934, two additional classrooms were built onto the rear of the building. Four high school classrooms were used for elementary students until William Monroe Elementary School was opened during the 1954-1955 school year.

Following the will of the voters of Greene County voters in 1961, a new William Monroe High School was opened in 1962. This building contained 15 classrooms on two parallel wings, a gymnasium/auditorium/cafeteria, and offices for guidance and administration. An addition of 4 classrooms and a library was built in 1970, and in 1982, a cafeteria was added, providing seating for 200 students. The following year, 1983, the school was expanded to include a new gymnasium with a seating capacity of 1200, coach's offices, and an extra classroom. In 1986, renovations occurred at the Greene County Technical Education Center, raising it to a contemporary state-of-the-art building.

Further renovations and additions to the main building were completed in January 1987. This expansion included a modern auditorium, dressing rooms, a performing music classroom, two computer labs, five classrooms, and teacher offices, bringing the total classroom number to 33.

In the fall of 1992, William Monroe Middle School was opened at the renovated site of William Monroe Elementary. The eighth-grade class moved to William Monroe Middle School to give the high school a 9-12 configuration.

In the summer of 1995, old sections of the building were renovated, and nine new classrooms and a large workroom were added to create a new science wing. The school subsequently added eleven classrooms (mobile units) adjacent to the math/science wing.

An alternative education program was started on March 1, 2000. It was housed in Trailer 13. In 2001, with the approval of the school board, this program was developed into a charter school called the New Directions Academy. The physical facility doubled and now has a full-time director, three teachers, and two secretarial assistants. The New Directions Academy continues to serve middle and high school students but is no longer a charter school.

A building addition was approved in the spring of 2005, and a new 18-classroom wing running parallel to the math/science wing was opened in late 2006.

In November 2020, modern renovations of the middle and high school won VMDO Architects the Platinum Design Award from the Virginia School Boards Association’s Exhibition of School Architecture.
