= Virginia Band and Orchestra Directors Association =

The Virginia Band and Orchestra Directors Association (more commonly known as VBODA) is an organization of high school, middle school, and elementary school band and orchestra directors within the Commonwealth of Virginia, whose mission is to help promote opportunities of music education to K-12 students. Many of the events that the VBODA organizes schools from around Virginia to compete with each other, and to give outstanding individual student musicians a chance to work with renowned conductors around the United States. The VBODA is the primary arbiter for various band and orchestra events throughout the Commonwealth of Virginia.

== Organization ==
The VBODA is a subsidiary of the Virginia Music Educators Association and MENC: The National Association for Music Education. The VBODA itself has an executive board, which consists of a President, President-Elect, Secretary, Treasurer, Middle School Representative, String Representative, Manual Editor, Manual Distribution Manager, and Marching Festival Chairman. The VBODA has 16 districts which are run by the executive board, and are under the supervision of a district representative. All executive board members and district representatives are band or orchestra directors of schools throughout Virginia.

== VBODA Sponsored Events and Awards for School Ensembles ==
=== State Marching Band Festival ===
The State Marching Band Festival is held in five different school sites throughout the Commonwealth, which are the West, Central, East, Northeast, and Southeast. Most schools in each of the competition sites are roughly located in their respective region within Virginia. Groups are then classified by the marching band's number of playing members (winds + percussion), from 1A (smallest, 50 or fewer members) to 5A (largest).

Unlike many other band competitions, there are no awards for 1st place, etc., but every band receives a rating of I (Superior); II (Excellent); III (Good); IV (Fair); or V (Poor). In "Olympic Festival" format, a panel of five judges rates each band. The highest and the lowest ratings from individual judges are removed before determining the band's final rating. An example would be if a band receives one I rating, three II ratings, and one III rating; the I and III would be removed, giving the band a final rating of II, which is the average of the other three judges who all gave the band a II.

=== District Concert Band Festival ===
This event is held typically in the first couple of weekends in March. Unlike the State Marching Band Festival where there are five sites spread out throughout the region, the Concert Band festival is held at least one site for each district, because more groups typically perform at this event. Many high schools have two or three concert bands and thus bring each group to the festival. A very large amount of middle schools also bring their bands to this event as well.

Each band is classified by the grade of music they are playing, which ranges from I (easy) to VI (hard). Most high school bands play music that range from grade IV to VI; middle school bands tend to play music in the grade II or III category, and some middle school bands with a high degree of talent play at grade IV.

In the concert band festival, most bands choose to play three pieces in an auditorium. The repertoire always consists of one march, one piece from an overture or suite, and one piece of their choice. A panel of three judges then grades the group a rating from I to V, similar to the way judges give ratings at the State Marching Festival. After the concert, the band will go to a different room to sightread a piece. The piece is always two grade levels below the repertoire they played at the concert (A band that plays Grade VI in the concert plays a Grade IV in the sightreading), unless it is a Grade II or I band who would play a beginning level piece. The sightreading judge then assigns the band a rating from I to V.

Some bands choose not to do sightreading, and perform only in the concert. By doing so, they are to prepare four pieces (one march, one overture/suite, and two other pieces of the band's choosing at the same level). During the festival, the band will still play three pieces like other bands who do sightreading because of time constraints. The three pieces are chosen in this order. First, the march will be played. Of the remaining three pieces, the judges (about a week before the festival) get to pick one of the three remaining pieces, and the band chooses the third piece of the remaining two after the judges pick.

The four judges' ratings are all averaged (but weighted more heavily towards the concert judges) to determine the band's final rating, which ranges from I to V. For example, a band that received two I's and a II from the third concert judge, and a II from the sightreading judge will receive a final rating of I, but a band with two II's and a I from the third concert judge and the sightreading judge get a II, though both bands had two I's and II's.

=== District/Regional Orchestra Festival ===
This event is held typically in the first half of March in the same format as the District Concert Band Festival, except with string only ensembles and other symphony orchestras from both the high and middle school level. Many schools bring multiple groups to the festival, especially if they have a strong orchestra program.

The festival is held at the district level whenever possible, but orchestras may have regional festivals, and/or may play during the District Concert Band Festival, especially if there are not many school districts with orchestra programs in the area.

All groups are stratified based on the grade of music (I to VI like the band) they are playing and are assigned a rating of I to V in the same format as the concert band festival, based on their concert and sightreading performance if they choose to do so.

=== Virginia Honor Band ===
Any school that receives a final rating of I at both the State Marching Band Festival and at Concert Band Festival with its highest graded ensemble is given the title of a Virginia Honor Band, a practice established in 1982. Schools are given special recognition if they win Honor Band Award 10 times and 15 times. Any school that wins the Virginia Honor Band Award 20 times or more is given the "Hall of Fame" designation.

Currently, seven schools are in the Hall of Fame: Lake Braddock Secondary School of Burke has been an Honor Band every year since the award was established (31 times); Charlottesville High School of Charlottesville (27 times); Hermitage High School of Richmond (30 times); Blacksburg High School (30 times); Robinson Secondary School of Fairfax (28 times); North Stafford High School (21 times); and James River High School of Midlothian (21 times).

== VBODA Sponsored Events and Awards for Individuals ==
=== All Regional Orchestra ===
There are several regions for the All Regional Orchestra which are composed of multiple districts. They are:

- Northern Virginia (Districts 10-12)
- North Central (9, 14-16)
- South Central (1, 3, 5, 6, 7, 13)
- Southeastern (2, 4, 8)

There are roughly 110 members in the regional orchestra, which includes mostly string players and some wind and percussion players. The auditions are typically held in late September for all players, and all auditions are administered by judges behind a partition to ensure anonymity as judges tend to be local high and middle school band and orchestra directors.

String players play two major scales, and a melodic minor three octaves in range. They also play a prepared piece, and a sight-reading piece. Wind and mallet percussion players play two major scales for the full range of their instrument, chromatic scale for the full range of their instrument as well as a prepared piece and a sight-reading piece. Percussion players play rudiments and rolls on the snare drum, as well as on other instruments including the timpani and auxiliary percussion.

The event is held around the first or second weekend of November each year, and the group is conducted by a guest conductor, usually from the college level. The top players of each instrumental section are eligible to audition for the All Virginia Band and Orchestra.

=== All District Band ===
All 16 VBODA districts have their own District Band, unlike the Regional Orchestras which combine several districts together.

Auditions for the All District Band are typically in early December or early January depending on the district's policy. Wind and mallet percussion plays play two major scales for the full range of their instrument; as well as prepared and sightreading pieces. Percussion players play rudiments and rolls on the snare drum, as well as on other instruments including the timpani and auxiliary percussion.

There are at least two district bands, one middle school band of about 100 members (6th, 7th and 8th grade); and a high school band with at least 100 members (9th-12th grade). Many districts however choose to have more than one band, usually for the high school level. Districts 10 and 12 (Fairfax County Public Schools, Arlington County, and Alexandria) have two bands, the top musicians in a wind ensemble of about 50 members and a consolation band with 100 members. The remaining districts choose to have two large high school bands with about 100 members each.

The event is held around the first or second weekend of February each year, and the group is conducted by a guest conductor, usually from the college level. The top players in each instrumental section are eligible to audition for the All Virginia Band and Orchestra.

=== All Virginia Band and Orchestra ===
Top players in the All Regional Orchestras and the All District Bands are eligible to audition for the All Virginia Band and Orchestra (more commonly known as All State Band or Orchestra), which is held on the third or fourth Saturday in February at a Virginia college or university. Historically, the auditions have been held at James Madison University in Harrisonburg.

String players, with the exception of double bass players are only eligible to play in the orchestra. All players are to play all major scales up to three octaves and all melodic minors up to and including 4 sharps and flats. They then are to play a prepared etude and sightreading piece which consists of the rest of their score. Harp players also are only able to audition for the orchestra, and are to play a technical etude (40% of score); a prepared piece (40% of score); and sightreading (20%) of score.

Most wind players (except for saxophones, euphoniums, and most low reeds) are eligible to audition for both the band and orchestra to play two major scales, and their chromatic scale to the full range of their instruments all which count for 40% of their score. They then play a prepared piece and sightreading selection which count 30% each toward their score.

Percussion players are eligible to audition for both the band and orchestra. They are to audition on three instruments which they will play prepared pieces and sightreading on: timpani, snare, and mallets. The top performers on timpani, snare, and mallets are the ones who make All Virginia. Auditioners go to six rooms during the audition in the following order where they play rudiments and scales (if applicable): Timpani prepared piece; Timpani sightreading; Snare prepared piece; Snare sightreading; Mallets prepared piece; Mallets sightreading If an auditioner makes All Virginia in more than one percussion category, she or he is placed in the group and category that she or he preferred to be in.

The placement of students in the band and orchestra is dependent on the auditioner's preference (if available) and how well she or he does relative to other auditioners. There is one orchestra, and two concert bands (the first band is the Symphonic Band, the second band is the Concert Band). Each group has about 110 members each.

The All Virginia Band and Orchestra event is held during the first Thursday through Saturday of April in a Virginia high school, college, or university in varying locations each year.

=== Virginia Honor Band Directors ===
Individual band directors of Virginia high schools who receive the honor band award multiple times are given special recognitions if they do so 10 and 15 years, regardless at how many schools she or he won the honor band with. A band director joins the VBODA "Hall of Fame" if she or he wins the award 20 times, again without regard to how many schools the director won the honor band award previously.

Currently, there are three Hall of Fame Band Directors, who are Vince Tornello, who won the award 26 times, all at Charlottesville High School of Charlottesville City; Dan Schoemmell, who won the award 22 times, 11 at James Wood High School of Winchester, and 11 at Sherando High School of Stephens City; and Roy Holder, who won the award 22 times, 20 at Lake Braddock Secondary School and 2 at West Potomac High School of Alexandria.
