= Broadway High School (Broadway, Virginia) =

Location
- 269 Gobbler Drive; Broadway, Virginia 22815; United States; 38°36′21″N 78°47′41″W

Information
- School type: Public, high school
- Motto: "Working together within a positive atmosphere to provide a foundation for lifelong learning."
- Established: 1872
- School district: Rockingham County Public Schools
- Superintendent: Larry Shifflett
- Principal: Dan Sanders
- Grades: 9–12
- Enrollment: 1,038 (2016-17)
- Colors: Gobbler green, black and white
- Athletics conference: VHSL Region 3C; Valley District
- Mascot: Strut the fighting gobbler
- Newspaper: The Gobbler Gab
- Yearbook: Memories
- Website: Website

Broadway High School is a public secondary school in Broadway, Virginia. It is located at 269 Gobbler Drive.

== History ==
The original Broadway School was a small, one-room building that opened in the mid-1870s and was taught by C. E. Barglebaugh, just eighteen years old. Four rooms were added over the years, but it burned down in 1907. A brick building with a library, office, auditorium, and six rooms replaced it. A high school was built adjacent to that building in 1920, and grade school and high school were divided. A new facility built west of the town in the 1950s was used as a high school until completion of the current building at its current location in January 1998, upon which time it became J. Frank Hillyard Middle School, named for its former principal. The SCA buried a time capsule in 1992 that will be opened in 2032.

== Athletic ==
Fall	Winter	Spring
Football Girls Flag Football Girls & Boys Cross Country Girls Volleyball Girls Golf Girls Tennis Boys Water Polo	Girls & Boys Basketball Girls Water Polo Soccer Wrestling Cheer	Boys Tennis Football Boys Volleyball Girls & Boys Swimming Boys Golf Boys Baseball Girls Softball Track & Field

== Band department ==
The band department is currently headed by Danny Holland, and consists of Concert Band for the younger musicians, Wind Ensemble for mostly upperclassmen, and the Jazz band year round. Marching band begins in late summer and generally ends with a Christmas parade. For those who aren't in the cast or crew of the spring musical, there is pit orchestra. Broadway Band Department earned the status of Virginia Honor Band in both 2007 and 2010 as well as the Music Department earning the honor of Blue Ribbon School in 2010. The Fighting Gobbler Regiment is a proud blue ribbon school, winning local and state competitions yearly.

=== Marching Band ===
- 2005: (Fate of the Gods) First place in class A Parade of Champions at James Madison University
- 2005: (Fate of the Gods) Excellent Rating at VBODA
- 2006: (Ghost Train) First place in class A Parade of Champions at James Madison University
- 2006: (Ghost Train) Superior Rating at VBODA
- 2007: (Dances from Estancia) Superior Rating at VBODA
- 2008: (The Mask of Zorro) Excellent Rating at VBODA
- 2009: (Artist's Palette) Superior Rating at VBODA
- 2010: Dreams and Nightmares, an original composition by Ben Frenchak - Superior Rating at VBODA and First Place in Class A at Parade of Champions, hosted by James Madison University
- 2013: Transcendent Journey - Superior Rating at VBODA
- 2014: Mirror Images- Excellent Rating at VBODA
- 2015: Trials and Triumphs- Superior Rating at VBODA
- 2016- Deja Vu- Superior Rating at VBODA
- 2017- Melodium Aeturnum- Superior Rating at VBODA
- 2018: Journey to Joy- Superior Rating at VBODA
- 2019: Spectrum- Superior Rating at VBODA
- 2021: Of Bells and Angels- Superior Rating at VBODA
- 2022: Across the Universe- Superior Rating at VBODA
- 2023: Trapped!- Superior Rating at VBODA
- 2024: As I Sit And Wonder- Superior Rating at VBODA
- 2024: First place class 2A at Powhatan Fall Classic, Orange Division Grand Champion

=== Wind Ensemble ===
- 2004 Superior Rating at VBODA
- 2005 Superior Rating at VBODA
- 2006 Superior Rating at VBODA
- 2007 Superior Rating at VBODA
- 2008 Superior Rating at VBODA
- 2009 Superior Rating at VBODA
- 2010 Superior Rating at VBODA
- 2011 Superior Rating at VBODA
- 2012 Superior Rating at VBODA
- 2013 Superior Rating at VBODA
- 2014 Superior Rating at VBODA
- 2023 Superior Rating at VBODA
- 2024 Superior Rating at VBODA

== Academics ==
The Broadway Academic team of '06-'07 had twenty-six members: one freshman, six sophomores, one junior, and eighteen seniors. Their A team beat all schools at least once save for Lee and Rockbridge.

Broadway High School is also a participant in Massanutten Regional Governor's School for Integrated Science and Technology, alongside all the other schools in the district.
