= Spotswood High School (Virginia) =

Public high school in Virginia, US

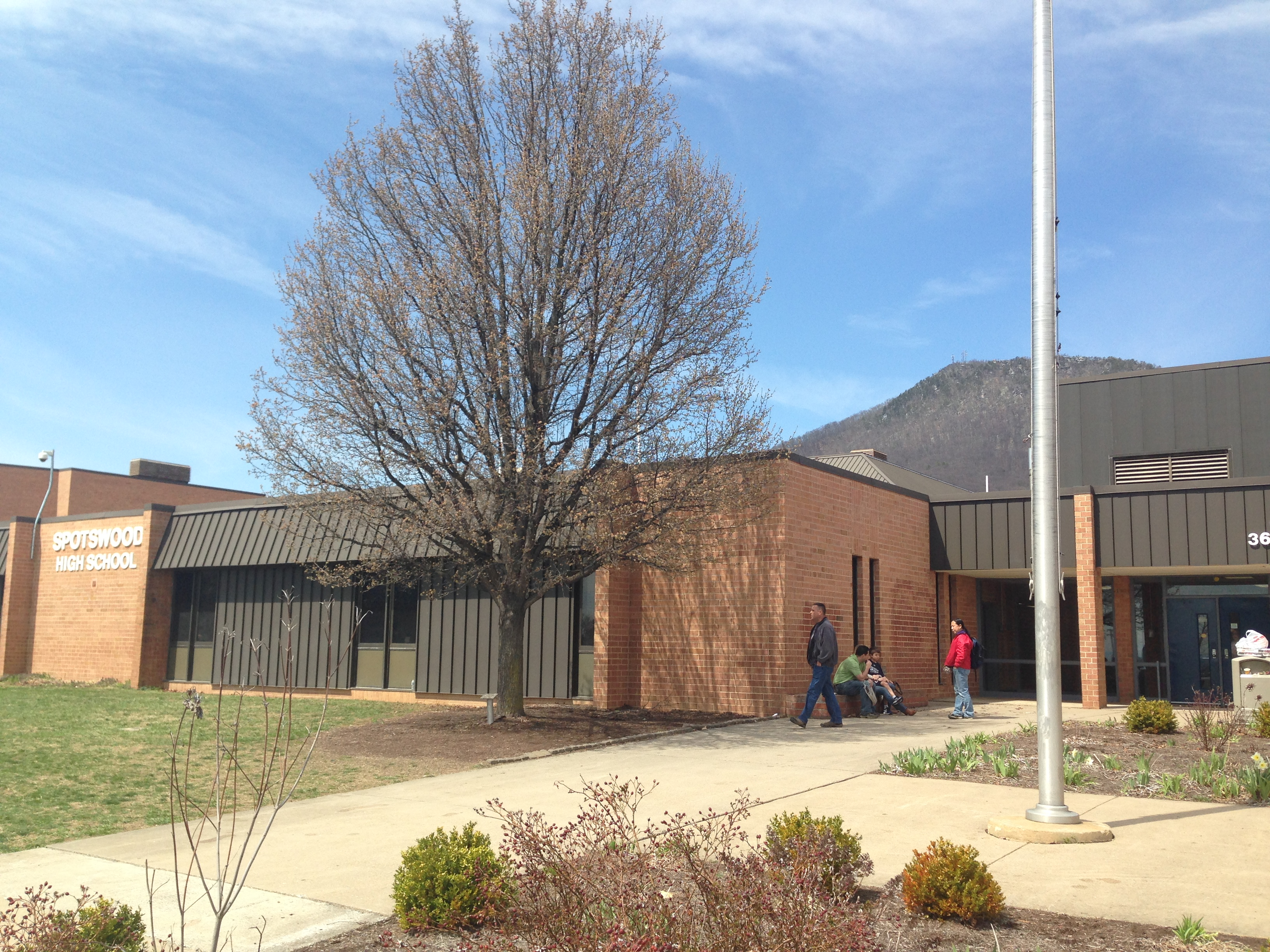

Location
- 368 Blazer Drive; Penn Laird, Virginia 22846; United States; 38°22′30″N 78°45′46″W

Information
- School type: Public high school
- Motto: All students will acquire the knowledge, skills, and values needed for personal growth and responsible citizenship.
- Founded: 1980
- Locale: Rural, Fringe
- School district: Rockingham County Public Schools
- NCES District ID: 5103390
- Superintendent: Larry Shifflett
- NCES School ID: 510339001872
- Principal: Brandy Strickler
- Teaching staff: 59.41 (on an FTE basis)
- Grades: 9–12
- Enrollment: 880 (2024–25)
- Student to teacher ratio: 14.81
- Language: English
- Colors: Blue and Gray
- Athletics conference: VHSL Group 3A West Region; Valley District
- Mascot: Trailblazer
- Team name: Trailblazers
- Rival: East Rockingham Eagles
- Newspaper: none
- Yearbook: The Blaze
- Website: shs.rockingham.k12.va.us

Spotswood High School is a high school in Penn Laird, Virginia, in shadow of the Massanutten Peak. As of 2026, it competes in the Virginia High School League.

== History ==
Spotswood High School was established in 1980 as Spotswood Senior High School, serving grades 10–12. James Upperman was the first principal. The school was named in honor of Lieutenant-Colonel Alexander Spotswood. The school colors, blue and gray, were selected from the colors of the two high schools it consolidated in the 1980s: Elkton High School (blue and gold) and Montevideo (maroon and gray). Elkton's High School color was actually navy blue, however, royal blue was used instead. The official nickname selected was Trailblazers even though it is rarely used. In the fall of 1984, Spotswood became a 9–12 school and changed to its present name, Spotswood High School.

In 2009, Rockingham County Public Schools took notice of the increased population in the eastern portion of Rockingham County and opened its fourth high school, East Rockingham High School. The opening of ERHS alleviated the overcrowding problem at Spotswood and cut the enrollment of the school in half.

== Current administration ==
- Principal – Brandy Strickler
- Asst. Principal – Rebecca Arbaugh, Jeff Bond, & Anneke Martin
- Athletic Director – Matt Rhea
- Resource Officer – Rodrigo

== Student body ==
The enrollment of Spotswood is approaching the 900 mark. The students come from several small towns and unincorporated communities in the area, such as Penn Laird and Keezletown. In 2008, the student body population was reported by the Board of Education to have the following enrollment characteristics. In 2008, the student population was approaching 1500, but after the new East Rockingham High School opened in 2009, the overcrowding problem was alleviated temporarily. In 2020, students from the Grottoes area were moved to East Rockingham High School due to further overcrowding.

- Grade

9th	10th	11th	12th
213	214	214	211

- Gender

Male	Female
429	423

== VHSL titles ==
- 1981 State AA Girls Softball State Champions
- 1981 State AA Girls Cross Country Champions
- 1982 State AA Girls Tennis Spring Champions
- 1993 State AA Boys Basketball Team Champions
- 1995 State AA Girls Cross Country Champions
- 1999 State AA Boys Outdoor Track Champions
- 2005 State AA Girls Basketball Winter Champions
- 2019 State AAA Girls Basketball Winter Champions
- 2020 State AAA Girls Basketball Winter Champions
- 2024 State AAA Girls Cross Country Champions
- 2025 State AAA Boys Basketball Winter Champions
- 2025 State AAA Baseball Champions

== Band ==
Spotswood High School was named a Virginia Honor Band in 2007-2008. This is the first time the band program has received this honor since 2004-2005. The Spotswood Fine Arts Program has also been nominated for the VMEA Blue Ribbon Award, which honors programs in that have worked towards a superior rating for the Marching Band, Concert Band, and Choir-which Spotswood High School did in 2007-2008.

Spotswood High School, in Penn Laird Virginia, has several musical groups, including concert band, wind ensemble, one percussion ensembles, a jazz ensemble, and the Marching Trailblazers, composed of winds, percussion, and the color guard.

The band program at SHS has won numerous musical awards in many categories for each group, including nine Virginia Honor Band awards, which require a superior rating from each the Symphonic Band and the Marching Band. A Virginia Honors Band award requires that the marching band receive a superior rating (I) at the annual state marching festival, and the highest level concert band of the school also receive a superior (I).

There are usually two or three 'stage' concerts, in some combination of Concert, Symphonic, and Jazz, at Spotswood per year; in addition, the two concert bands perform yearly at the VBODA District Band Festival. The marching band performs at every home football game on Friday nights, as well as various competitions throughout the fall.

== Controversy ==
Spotswood made headlines briefly in 2000, when teacher Jeff Newton, with the backing of freedom of speech advocacy organizations including the ACLU and American Library Association, went to court over an incident covering several weeks in September 1999, when then principal C. James Slye ordered Newton to remove anticensorship pamphlets from his classroom's door that had been posted in observance of Banned Books Week. The pamphlet in question was a list of books that had been challenged or banned in schools, libraries and bookstores around the country during the late 1990s; these books include several revered and widely read American works, such as Adventures of Huckleberry Finn, The Color Purple, Of Mice and Men and Death of a Salesman, but also include highly sexualized or "vulgar" books that the US Supreme Court found legal to exclude from public schools in the 1982 case of Board of Education v. Pico. ALA | Challenged and Banned Books The ACLU charged that Spotswood was effectively censoring the anticensorship message of the pamphlet outside of his constitutional rights and blatantly failed to follow the Rockingham County School Board Policy for mediating issues related to controversial and sensitive materials. The suit was dismissed before the case could be heard, when Newton resigned from the district.

== Notable alumni ==
- Daryl Irvine (class of 1983), professional baseball player in Major League Baseball
