= Harrisonburg High School (Virginia) =

Public school in Virginia, United States

Location
- 1001 Garbers Church Road; Harrisonburg, Virginia 22801; United States; 38°26′32″N 78°54′33″W

Information
- Type: Public
- Motto: Unity in Diversity
- Established: 1879
- School district: Harrisonburg City Public Schools
- Principal: Melissa Hensley
- Grades: 9–12
- Enrollment: 998 (2024–25)
- Colors: Navy Blue, red, and white
- Athletics conference: Virginia High School League; Class 3 Region 3C; Valley District League
- Team name: Blue Streaks
- Newspaper: Newsstreak
- Yearbook: The Taj
- Website: harrisonburg.k12.va.us/hhs

Harrisonburg High School (HHS), part of the Harrisonburg City School System, is a public high school located in Harrisonburg, Virginia, United States. HHS serves grades nine through twelve, and its athletic teams are known as the Blue Streaks. During the 2024-2025 school year, 998 students were enrolled. It was rated "Fully Accredited" by the Virginia Department of Education for the 2017–2018 school year. As of the fall of 2024, it serves students residing in the western part of Harrisonburg.

== History ==
Harrisonburg High School was founded in 1879 and was initially located on South Main Street. In 1928, it was moved to South High Street; in 1967, the high school was moved to Grace Street. During this time it housed students from grades seven upward, but when Thomas Harrison Middle School was built in 1989, grades seven and eight were shifted from the high school department, and the high school expanded to include both South High Street and Grace Street complexes. The complex was used to hold wrestling shows for Jim Cornette and his Smokey Mountain Wrestling promotion until its closure in 1995. The entire complex renovated in 1994, on its hundredth anniversary, but was subsequently leased and later sold to James Madison University, after the construction and opening of a new building on Garbers Church Road on August 24, 2005. The HHS school board agreed to move to One Court Square in Harrisonburg; its plans were endorsed by the Harrisonburg City Council on February 8, 2011. In August 2019, the Harrisonburg City Council announced the plan to build a second high school in Harrisonburg in order to alleviate overcrowding in HHS. Rocktown High School was officially opened at the beginning of the 2024–25 school year, serving students residing in the eastern part of Harrisonburg.

== VHSL titles ==
Harrisonburg is in the Valley District of the Virginia High School League (VHSL). Originally in Region II, it was reclassified as Region V in 2007. When VHSL replaced its former three group classification system with a six group classification system in 2013, Harrisonburg became part of Group 5A, renamed to Class 5 in 2023. After the drop in enrollment following the opening of Rocktown High School, Harrisonburg High School was moved to Class 3 in 2024, which went into effect for the 2025-26 season.

- 1969–1976 State AA Boys Tennis Champions
- 1978, 1979 State AA Boys Basketball Champions
- 1979 State AA Girls Outdoor Track Champions
- 1980–1982 State AA Girls Tennis Champions
- 1991 State AA Boys Tennis Champions
- 1991 State AA Girls Tennis Champions
- 1987, 1989, 1993 State AA Creative Writing
- 1994 State AA Girls Outdoor Track Champions (tied with Abingdon)
- 1996 State AA Boys Golf Champions
- 2001 State AA Division 3 Football Champions
- 2007 State AA Boys Outdoor Track Champions
- 2007–08 State AA Theatre Champions
- 2011–2012 State AA Debate Champions

== Notable alumni ==
- Henry G. Blosser (1928–2013), Nuclear physicist and winner of the Tom W. Bonner Prize in Nuclear Physics
- Akeem Jordan – Former NFL football player
- John Otho Marsh Jr. – Career U.S. Army officer (1944–1976), U.S. Representative from the State of Virginia (1963–1971), and as the Secretary of the Army under Presidents Ronald Reagan and George Bush (1981–1989)
- Bill Mims – Current Justice of the Supreme Court of Virginia, former Virginia Attorney General
- Ralph Sampson – Former NBA basketball player and Hall of Famer
- Howard Stevens – Former NFL football player
- Kristi Toliver – Current WNBA coach and former WNBA basketball player
- Landon Turner – Current NFL football player
- John Wade – Retired NFL football player
