= List of neighborhoods in Roanoke, Virginia =

This is a list of neighborhoods in Roanoke city, Virginia as defined and mapped by the city of Roanoke. The city has 49 officially designated neighborhoods within its city limits.

Airport

The Airport neighborhood is located in far, north, central Roanoke and is bound by Roanoke County, Airport Road, Hershberger Road, and Interstate 581. As the name would suggest, the primary feature of the neighborhood is the Roanoke Regional Airport, with most development being commercial in nature beginning with the opening of Crossroads Mall in 1961.

Belmont

Belmont is located in central Roanoke and is bound by the Norfolk Southern shops, 13th Street, Highland Avenue and Interstate 581. The majority of the structures standing within the neighborhood date from Roanoke's emergence as a railroad center between 1890 and 1950. In recent years, Belmont has seen significant urban revitalization efforts undertaken from the city with a program entitled Southeast... By Design.

Cherry Hill

Cherry Hill is located in far west, central Roanoke and is bound by 31st Street, Shenandoah Avenue, the Norfolk Southern railroad right-of-way and the city of Salem. Originally developed around the Roanoke Electric Steel plant in the late 1940s, this has since transitioned into a more traditional suburban neighborhood with most homes constructed in the 1970s and 1980s.

Downtown

Downtown Roanoke is located at the heart of the city and is roughly bounded by Interstate 581, Elm Avenue, 5th Street and the Norfolk Southern right-of-way. The Downtown core is noted as the center of business for the Roanoke Valley, the Roanoke City Market, Downtown Historic District and many other attractions and amenities.

Edgewood-Summit Hills

Edgewood-Summit Hills is located in far west, central Roanoke and is bound by Melrose Avenue, Peters Creek Road, the Salem Turnpike and the city of Salem. Primarily residential in nature, the majority of its homes were built in the 1950s through 1960, this was annexed by Roanoke in 1976.

Fairland

Fairland is located in northern Roanoke and is bound by Interstate 581, Hershberger Road, and Cove Road. Fairland is primarily residential in nature with the bulk of structures constructed since the 1950s.

Fallon

Fallon is located in east, central Roanoke and is bound by the Norfolk Southern right-of-way, 13th Street, Dale Avenue and the town of Vinton. The majority of the structures standing within the neighborhood date from Roanoke's emergence as a railroad center between 1890 and 1950.

Franklin-Colonial

The Franklin-Colonial neighborhood generally encompasses the areas between Franklin Road and Colonial Avenue between Brandon Road and the Roanoke County line. Developed primarily in the post-World War II era, the neighborhood is residential with commercial uses fronting both Colonial Avenue and Franklin Road. Bisected by the Roy L. Webber Expressway, this is also the location of the Virginia Western Community College campus.

Gainsboro

Gainsboro is located in central Roanoke and is bound by Shenandoah Avenue, 5th Street, Orange Avenue and Interstate 581. Resting just to the southwest of the original 1835 Gainesborough settlement, the present day Gainsboro began to develop in the 1850s following the arrival of the Virginia and Tennessee Railroad. Incorporated as part of the original Roanoke in 1882, most of its development occurred between 1890 and 1940. Serving as the historic center of Roanoke's African-American community, the area is also notable as the location of the Hotel Roanoke.

Garden City

Annexed by the city in 1949, Garden City is located in far, southeast Roanoke and is bound by Roanoke County, Mill Mountain, Riverland Road, Yellow Mountain Road and the Blue Ridge Parkway. Development of the neighborhood can be traced to the establishment of the American Viscose Plant along the Roanoke River in 1917. Initially remaining relatively rural in nature, after the annexation rapid suburbanization occurred within the area giving it its current appearance.

Gilmer

Gilmer is located in central Roanoke and is bound by the Norfolk Southern Railway right-of-way, Moorman Avenue, 5th Street and 14th Street. Originally developed in the 1920s, the neighborhood in recent years has seen significant revitalization efforts since 1980 led by the Northwest Neighborhood Environmental Organization.

Grandin Court

Grandin Court is located in southwest Roanoke and is bound by Grandin Road, Creston Avenue, Persinger Road and Roanoke County. Developed between 1920 and 1960, the neighborhood was annexed into Roanoke by way of two separate annexations occurring in both 1926 and 1943. Today the neighborhood is primarily residential in character and is the location of Fishburn Park and Patrick Henry High School.

Greater Deyerle

Greater Deyerle is located in far southwest Roanoke and is bound by the Norfolk Southern right-of-way, the Raleigh Court neighborhood, Salem and Roanoke County. Taking its name from early Roanoke County architect and builder Benjamin Deyerle, this was annexed into Roanoke in 1976. The development of Deyerle has primarily occurred since the 1950s, being predominantly residential with commercial lining the main arterials.

Harrison

Harrison is located in central Roanoke and is bound by Orange Avenue, Moorman Road, 5th Street and 14th Street. Noted as being the location of the 1914 Harrison School, the first school for African-American children constructed in the Roanoke Valley, today the neighborhood retains its large stock of homes built between 1900 and 1920.

Hollins

Hollins, not to be confused with the Census Designated Place called Hollins in Roanoke County, is located in northeast Roanoke along Tinker Creek and was annexed into the city in 1976.

Hurt Park

Hurt Park is located in west, central Roanoke and is bound by 10th Street, 24th Street, the Roanoke River and the Norfolk Southern railroad right-of-way. The neighborhood is characterized by its large stock of mansions constructed for railroad executives around the turn of the 20th century.

Kenwood

Kenwood is located in southeast Roanoke and is bound by Dale Avenue, 13th Street, the Roanoke River and the town of Vinton. Originally developed around the American Viscose Plant along the Roanoke River in 1917, Kenwood is a traditional residential area with the bulk of the housing constructed between 1920 and 1940.

Loudon-Melrose

Loudon-Melrose is located in west, central Roanoke and is bound by 14th Street, 24th Street, Orange Avenue and the Norfolk Southern railroad right-of-way. The Loudon-Melrose area initially developed after the completion of the Salem-Melrose streetcar line with most structures dating back to the 1920s.

Mecca Gardens

Mecca Gardens is located in northeast Roanoke at the border with Roanoke County and was annexed into the city in 1976. The area is dominated by low density residential development occurring primarily since the 1970s.

Melrose-Rugby

Melrose-Rugby is located in north, central Roanoke, and is bound by Orange Avenue, Lafayette Boulevard, Interstate 581 and Washington Park. Initially developed between 1889 and 1920 as a result of the construction of the Salem-Melrose streetcar line by 1890, Melrose-Rugby is regarded as one of Roanoke's initial suburbs. Due to the historic nature of the area, in 2002 Melrose-Rugby was designated as Roanoke's first Neighborhood Design District.

Mill Mountain

Mill Mountain is located in southeast Roanoke and consists of the mostly undeveloped areas of Mill Mountain. Largely undeveloped and preserved as parkland since donated to the city in the 1940s, Mill Mountain is the location of both the Mill Mountain Star and the Mill Mountain Zoo and the former site of the Mill Mountain Incline.

Miller Court/Arrowood

Miller Court/Arrowood is located in far northwest Roanoke at the border with Roanoke County along Peters Creek Road. The area is dominated by low density residential development occurring primarily since the 1960s.

Monterey

Monterey is located in northeast Roanoke at the border with Roanoke County and was annexed into the city in 1976. The area is dominated by low density residential development occurring primarily since the 1970s.

Morningside

Morningside is located in southeast Roanoke and is bound by 13th Street, Highland Avenue and the Roanoke River. Originally developed as the location of the American Viscose Plant along the Roanoke River in 1917, Morningside has both a traditional residential area with the bulk of the housing constructed between 1920 and 1940 in addition to industrial areas in the vicinity of the former plant.

Mountain View

Mountain View is located in west, central Roanoke and is bound by Cleveland Avenue, Patterson Avenue, 19th Street and 10th Street. The neighborhood is characterized by its large stock of mansions constructed for railroad executives around the turn of the 20th century.

Norwich

Norwich is located in western Roanoke, south of the Roanoke River and to the north of the Raleigh Court neighborhood. Developed in the 1880s as an industrial village, Norwich was annexed into Roanoke in 1919 and since the 1960s has remained residential in character with some areas of industrial infill.

Old Southwest

Old Southwest is located in central Roanoke and is bound by Marshall Avenue, Day Avenue, Jefferson Street and the Roanoke River. Listed on both the Virginia Landmarks Register and the National Register of Historic Places, Old Southwest was annexed by Roanoke in 1890 and developed into a wealthy residential area just south of downtown. Today the neighborhood is a mix of commercial and residential uses and is experiencing significant gentrification.

Peachtree/Norwood

Peachtree/Norwood is located in far northwest Roanoke at the border with Salem. The area is dominated by low density residential development occurring primarily since the 1960s.

Preston Park

Preston Park is located in northeast Roanoke at the border with Roanoke County. The area is dominated by residential development occurring primarily since the 1960s.

Raleigh Court

Raleigh Court is located in southwest Roanoke, south of the Roanoke River and the Memorial Bridge and to the north of the Grandin Court neighborhood. Seeing its first significant development in 1906, the neighborhood was annexed into Roanoke in 1919 and is considered to be Roanoke's first suburb. Today the neighborhood is mixed-use in character and is the location of the Grandin Village.

Ridgewood Park

Ridgewood Park is located in far west, central Roanoke and is bound by Peters Creek Road, the Salem Turnpike, Shenandoah Avenue and the city of Salem. Originally farmland, in area is primarily residential in character as it developed in the 1950s and 1960s. It was annexed by Roanoke in 1976.

Riverdale

Riverdale is located in far southeast Roanoke and is bound by Rutrough Road, the Roanoke River and the town of Vinton. Areas closest to the former American Viscose Plant exhibit a more traditional residential area with the areas on the periphery exhibiting more contemporary suburbanization trends.

Riverland/Walnut Hills

Riverland/Walnut Hills is located in southeast Roanoke and is located at the base of Mill Mountain south of the Roanoke River. Dating to the 1920s, the neighborhood forms the gateway to Mill Mountain from the city.

Roundhill

Roundhill is located in northern Roanoke and is bound by Hershberger Road, Williamson Road and Interstate 581. Today the area is recognized as a regional retail destination as the location of Valley View Mall, with residential development occurring in the eastern areas of the neighborhood since the 1960s.

Shenandoah West

Shenandoah West is located in west, central Roanoke and is bound by 24th Street, 31st Street, Orange Avenue and the Norfolk Southern railroad right-of-way. The area is primarily residential and the location of the Lansdowne and Melrose Towers public housing communities.

South Jefferson

South Jefferson is located southeast of Downtown Roanoke and is roughly bound by the Roy L. Webber Expressway and the Roanoke River. Consisting of former warehouses and brownfields adjacent to the Norfolk Southern right-of-way, this area is seeing significant redevelopment including the Carilion Clinic.

South Roanoke

South Roanoke is located in southern Roanoke between Mill Mountain, Franklin Road and Roanoke County. Centered on the historic Crystal Springs, South Roanoke was annexed into Roanoke in 1915. Today the neighborhood remains mostly intact as it was originally developed and remains one of Roanoke's more affluent, established neighborhoods.

South Washington Heights

South Washington Heights is located in far west, central Roanoke and is bound by Peters Creek Road, the Salem Turnpike, Melrose Avenue and 36th Street. Primarily residential in nature, this area also features the Williams Memorial Park.

Southern Hills

Southern Hills is the southernmost neighborhood in Roanoke, located between U.S. 220, Mill Mountain Parkway and Roanoke County. Annexed into Roanoke in 1976, Southern Hills is an area of contrasts with higher density residential and commercial development along 220 and rural, low density development at its interior.

Villa Heights

Villa Heights is located in northern Roanoke and is bound by Cove Road, Lafayette Boulevard, Melrose Avenue and the Roanoke Country Club. Villa Heights was originally subdivided in 1910 with the southern section having homes dating back to the 1920s and the northern section becoming more modern in design.

Wasena

Wasena is located in south, central Roanoke and is bound by the Roanoke River, Greater Raleigh Court and Brandon Avenue. Taking its name from the Native American word meaning "beautiful view," Wasena developed as an early suburb of Roanoke in the 1920s.

Washington Heights

Washington Heights is located in northwest Roanoke, and is dominated by low density residential development occurring primarily since the 1940s.

Washington Park

Washington Park is located in central Roanoke and is bound by Orange Avenue, 10th Street and Interstate 581. Seeing rapid development between 1920 and 1960, this is the location of Washington Park and the Lincoln Terrace public housing project.

West End

West End is located in central Roanoke and is bound by Campbell Avenue, Marshall Avenue, 5th Street, 7th Street, 10th Street and the Norfolk Southern railroad right-of-way. Located immediately west of Downtown Roanoke, this area contains a significant number of commercial and industrial properties.

Westview Terrace

Westview Terrace is located in far northwest Roanoke, and is dominated by low density residential development occurring primarily since the 1960s.

Wildwood

Wildwood is located in eastern Roanoke at the border with the town of Vinton and was annexed into the city in 1976. The area is dominated by low density residential development occurring primarily since the 1970s with commercial development along its Orange Avenue frontage.

Williamson Road

The Williamson Road neighborhood is located in east central Roanoke and is centered on Williamson Road from Bowman Park to its crossing with Interstate 581. Today the area is the location of the Berglund Center, home of the Roanoke Rail Yard Dawgs professional hockey team.

Wilmont

Wilmont is located in far west, central Roanoke and is bound by Peters Creek Road, the Salem Turnpike, Shenandoah Avenue and 36th Street. Primarily residential in nature, this area features both traditional and suburban characteristics as its development occurred between 1920 and 1960.
