= Williamson Road =

Road in Roanoke County, Virginia, US

Williamson Road is an approximately 8.0 mi (12.9 km) long road in Roanoke City and Roanoke County, Virginia. The road runs from downtown Roanoke in the south through the Botetourt County line in the north. For the majority of its length Williamson Road carries U.S. Route 11. The road was named after the former Williamson farm through which a portion of the road was constructed after Virginia obtained the land through eminent domain.

== Route ==
Williamson Road begins in the south at an interchange with Jefferson Street near the boundary of downtown Roanoke with the Old Southwest neighborhood. For the next couple of blocks, Williamson Road passes through an area consisting largely of parking garages for downtown Roanoke. The road enters the business district of downtown Roanoke at its intersection with Elm Avenue (State Route 24), which is also the location of the former Carilion Roanoke Community Hospital. For the next several blocks, Williamson Road generally marks the eastern edge of commercial development in downtown Roanoke. Williamson Road also picks up the US 11 and, briefly, the U.S. Route 221 designations in downtown. After crossing Norfolk Southern's railyard on the Hunter Viaduct, Williamson Road passes the Hotel Roanoke before an interchange with Interstate 581. The Roanoke Civic Center is located just beyond I-581 at the intersection of Williamson Road and Orange Avenue, which carries U.S. Route 460 and also picks up US 221 here. The 460-221 concurrency continues through Bedford, Virginia.

The approximately three mile segment of Williamson Road between Orange Avenue and Hershberger Road (State Route 101) developed into Roanoke's first major automobile centered commercial strip during the middle of the 20th century. Retail establishments such as Sears, restaurants, motels, and car dealerships were mainstays of Williamson Road. Cruising Williamson Road became a favored Saturday night activity for Roanoke's teenagers. The road still maintains some remnants of this history though most major retail has left for malls with largely small, locally owned businesses remaining. Magic City Ford, a dealership located across from the Roanoke Civic Center and on the corner of Orange Avenue and Williamson Road is one of only two large dealerships on Williamson Road. The other dealership being Berglund, originally a Chevrolet dealership that now sells several other makes, which maintains its original location near Orange Avenue. Other new dealerships have left for larger spaces, though there are still some used car dealers. Williamson Road still has many restaurants with both fast food and sit down establishments. The area has also seen the establishment of businesses catering to Roanoke's growing number of Latino and Asian immigrants.

== History ==
In the early 1980s, Williamson Road was home to massage parlors, which were frequently raided by police as suspected brothels, until neighborhood pressure and police action led to their closure.

In addition to businesses, Williamson Road has churches, schools, and a library. A business association has promoted a number of projects to improve the appearance of sections of the road. The ultimate goal is to develop Williamson Road and the surrounding neighborhoods into an urban village akin to the Grandin Village area of southwest Roanoke.

Williamson Road maintains largely the same character after its intersection with Hershberger Road. The best known business on this stretch is Happy's Flea Market which opened in the 1970s but is now closed. Happy's featured a large indoor building, formerly a department store, with rented stalls and an outdoor area which had vendors every Saturday and Sunday. Williamson Road crosses into Roanoke County shortly after Happy's. Peters Creek Road (State Route 117) terminates at its intersection with Williamson Road. Plantation Road (State Route 115) provides access to Interstate 81 and several industries, most notably ITT. The gateway to Hollins University connects to Williamson Road near its northern terminus at the Botetourt County line.
