= Villa Heights =

Villa Heights may refer to:

- Villa Heights, Henry County, Virginia, a census-designated place in Henry County, Virginia, United States
- Villa Heights (house), a historic house in Roanoke, Virginia
- Villa Heights, Roanoke, Virginia, a neighborhood in Roanoke, Virginia, United States
