= Eastgate, Roanoke, Virginia =

Coordinates: 37.293°N 79.908°W

Eastgate is a neighborhood of Roanoke, Virginia, in the United States. Eastgate is located in eastern Roanoke, along the eastern bank of Tinker Creek. It is bordered by the neighborhoods of Hollins on the west, Monterey on the north, Mecca Gardens and Wildwood on the southeast, and by Roanoke County to the northeast. Originally included as part of Roanoke County, Wildwood was annexed by the city in 1976. Predominantly rural prior to its annexation, growth within the neighborhood has been suburban in nature since the 1970s.
