= Campbell County Airport =

Campbell County Airport may refer to:

- Campbell County Airport (Tennessee) in Jacksboro, Tennessee, United States (FAA: JAU)
- Brookneal/Campbell County Airport in Brookneal, Virginia, United States (FAA: 0V4)
- Gillette–Campbell County Airport in Gillette, Wyoming, United States (FAA: GCC)
