= William Ruffner Middle School =

William Ruffner Middle School may refer to:

- W.H. Ruffner Academy in Norfolk, Virginia
- William Ruffner Middle School (Roanoke, Virginia), located in the Miller Court/Arrowood neighborhood
