= Belmont, Roanoke, Virginia =

Neighborhood of Roanoke, Virginia

Coordinates: 37.269506°N 79.931218°W

Belmont is a Roanoke, Virginia neighborhood located in southeast Roanoke. It borders the neighborhoods of Hollins and Williamson Road on the north, Morningside and South Jefferson to the south, Downtown on the west and Fallon on the east. Today the neighborhood is bisected by Virginia State Route 24 (Bullitt/Jamison Avenue) and is bordered by Interstate 581 to the west.

== History ==
Originally established as a neighborhood serving workers of the neighboring Roanoke Shops, the majority of the development in Belmont dates from between the 1890s and 1950s. The Southeast Action Forum serves as the citizen advocacy group for the neighborhood. The Belmont Methodist-Episcopal Church and Roanoke City Firehouse No. 6 are listed on the National Register of Historic Places.
