= Cherry Hill, Virginia =

Cherry Hill is the name of some populated places in the U.S. state of Virginia:

- Cherry Hill, Prince William County, Virginia
- Cherry Hill, Roanoke, Virginia
