= Airport, Roanoke, Virginia =

Airport
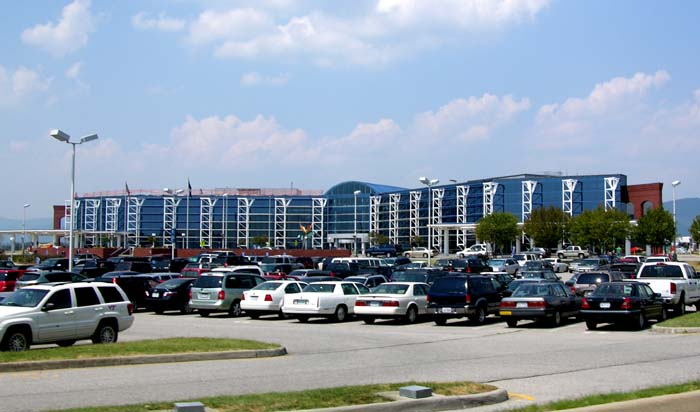
- Roanoke Regional Airport terminal building

- Location within Virginia Location within the United States
- Coordinates: 37°19′18.7″N 79°58′13″W
- Country: United States
- State: Virginia
- City: Roanoke
- Time zone: UTC-5 (EST)
  - Summer (DST): UTC-4 (EDT)
- ZIP Codes: 24012
- Area code: 540

Airport is a Roanoke, Virginia neighborhood located in north, central Roanoke surrounded roughly by Virginia State Route 118 to the south and by Interstate 581 to the west, centered on the Roanoke Regional Airport. It borders the neighborhoods of Miller Court/Arrowood on the west, Roundhill on the south and Roanoke County on the north and east.

== History ==
Annexed from Roanoke County in 1976, most development within the Airport neighborhood has been commercial in nature beginning with the opening of Crossroads Mall in 1961. Outside of the Roanoke Regional Airport property, the area remains primarily commercial and was also the location of the Advance Auto Parts corporate headquarters.
