= Interstate 73 in Virginia =

Highway in Virginia

Future Interstate 73

Route information
- Maintained by VDOT

Major junctions
- South end: I-73 / US 220 at the North Carolina state line near Price
- US 58 concurrency near Martinsville; I-581 concurrency from Roanoke to Hollins; I-81 concurrency from near Roanoke to Christiansburg; US 219 in Rich Creek, Virginia
- North end: I-73 / US 460 at the West Virginia state line in Glen Lyn

Location
- Country: United States
- State: Virginia

Highway system
- Interstate Highway System; Main; Auxiliary; Suffixed; Business; Future; Virginia Routes; Interstate; US; Primary; Secondary; Byways; History; HOT lanes
← SR 73	→ SR 74

Interstate 73 (I-73) was a planned Interstate Highway in Virginia. Authorized by the Intermodal Surface Transportation Efficiency Act of 1991 (ISTEA), Virginia's section would begin at the North Carolina state line and follow the U.S. Route 220 (US 220) corridor through Martinsville and Roanoke, then westerly into West Virginia, possibly along Corridor Q. Since its inception, environmental studies have been completed; but, because it scores low for project jobs in the state, the Virginia Department of Transportation (VDOT) has shelved plans for the foreseeable future. In 2024, the project was rescinded due to lack of funding.

== Route description ==
In Virginia, I-73 would continue north from the state line parallel to the US 220 corridor all the way to Roanoke. US 220 is a rural four-lane highway with many safety issues. As such, Virginia has decided to have I-73 immediately diverge from US 220 upon entering the commonwealth from North Carolina and travel around the east side of Martinsville, with US 220 as a freeway around the west side of Martinsville. The two would meet briefly south of Rocky Mount. I-73 would continue its northbound journey paralleling US 220 to the east until they converge south of Roanoke. At that point, I-73 and US 220 will run concurrent to I-581, which I-73 will follow to I-81.

If I-73 is extended northward, from Roanoke, it would turn southwest on I-81, running concurrent to east of Blacksburg, and then use the Smart Road to Blacksburg. The rest of the way to West Virginia would be an upgrade of US 460, Corridor Q of the Appalachian Development Highway System.

== History ==
In 1991, as Congress worked on reauthorization of the Surface Transportation Act, the Bluefield-to-Huntington Highway Association wanted an Interstate Highway, which would be called I-73, to run from Detroit, Michigan, to Charleston, South Carolina. In West Virginia, the highway would run alongside US 52, which was only two lanes but was still being used to transport coal from mines to barges on the Ohio River. The influential Robert Byrd, at the time West Virginia's senior senator, chaired the Senate Appropriations Committee, but even Byrd said funding for such a highway would be hard to find. In North Carolina, Marc Bush of the Greensboro Area Chamber of Commerce admitted the plan would benefit his area but said it was not a priority.

ISTEA defined High Priority Corridor 5, the "I-73/74 North-South Corridor from Charleston, South Carolina, through Winston-Salem, North Carolina, to Portsmouth, Ohio, to Cincinnati, Ohio, and Detroit, Michigan." This would provide for a single corridor from Charleston, splitting at Portsmouth, with I-74 turning west to its current east end in Cincinnati, and I-73 continuing north to Detroit.

In North Carolina, any new construction would require more money than the state had available, but Walter C. Sprouse Jr., executive director of the Randolph County Economic Development Corporation, pointed out that most of the route of I-73 included roads already scheduled for improvements that would make them good enough for Interstate designation. A connector between I-77 and US 52 at Mount Airy was planned, and US 52 from Mount Airy to Winston-Salem and US 311 from Winston-Salem to High Point were four-lane divided highways. A US 311 bypass of High Point was planned, which would eventually connect to US 220 at Randleman. I-73 would follow US 220 to Rockingham. Another possibility was following I-40 from Winston-Salem to Greensboro. In Winston-Salem, congestion on US 52 was expected to be a problem. The route through High Point was approved in May 1993.

By November of that year, however, an organization called Job Link, made up of business leaders from northern North Carolina and southern Virginia, wanted a major highway to connect Roanoke with the Greensboro area. It could be I-73, the group said, but did not have to be. In April 1995, John Warner, who chaired the Senate subcommittee that would select the route of I-73, announced his support for the Job Link proposal. This distressed Winston-Salem officials who were counting on I-73, though Greensboro had never publicly sought the road. But an aide to Senator Lauch Faircloth said the 1991 law authorizing I-73 required the road to go through Winston-Salem. Faircloth got around this requirement, though, by asking Warner to call the highway to Winston-Salem I-74. In May, Warner announced plans to propose legislation that made the plan for two Interstates official.

The National Highway System Designation Act of 1995 added a branch from Toledo, Ohio, to Sault Ste. Marie, Michigan, via the US 223 and US 127 corridors. (At the time, US 127 north of Lansing was part of US 27.) It also gave details for the alignments in West Virginia, Virginia, North Carolina, and South Carolina. I-73 and I-74 were to split near Bluefield, West Virginia, joining again between Randleman and Rockingham; both would end at Charleston. The American Association of State Highway and Transportation Officials (AASHTO) approved the sections of I-73 and I-74 south of I-81 in Virginia (with I-74 ending at I-73 near Myrtle Beach) on July 25, 1996, allowing for them to be marked once built to Interstate standards and connected to other Interstate routes. The final major change came with the Transportation Equity Act for the 21st Century of 1998 (TEA-21), when both routes were truncated to Georgetown, South Carolina.

North Carolina took the lead in signing highways as I-73 following AASHTO's approval in 1997 and since has approved construction projects to build new sections of the Interstate Highway. I-73 is essentially complete from Piedmont Triad International Airport in Greensboro to just south of Ellerbe. Two new sections of what will be I-73 are being completed, the section from the US 220/NC 68 junction to Piedmont Triad International Airport and the section south of Ellerbe to the junction with US 74 west of Rockingham. I-74 runs concurrent with I-73 from north of Asheboro to Rockingham, whence it will follow US 74 to Wilmington. The only other progress in building I-73 can be seen in Virginia and South Carolina. In 2005 Virginia completed an environmental impact statement (EIS) for its recommended route for I-73 from I-81 in Roanoke to the North Carolina border. The Federal Highway Administration (FHWA) approved the EIS report in April 2007. Virginia can now go ahead and draw up plans to construct the highway and proceed to build it once funds are obtained. South Carolina also has shown recent interest in building its section of I-73 with a corridor selected for the route from I-95 to Myrtle Beach in 2006 and a final decision on how the highway should be routed north of I-95 to the North Carolina border in July 2007. In January 2006, the South Carolina state legislature introduced bills to construct I-73 as a toll highway. It is hoped a guaranteed stream of revenue will allow it to build its section of I-73 within 10 years. The FHWA approved South Carolina's proposal on August 10, 2007.

Ohio and Michigan both abandoned further environmental studies on their portions of I-73. Most of the I-73 corridor in both of these states follows existing freeways or highways scheduled to be upgraded to freeways under plans that predate I-73. Furthermore, West Virginia has rebuilt its section of the corridor as a multilane surface highway instead of an Interstate-quality freeway, further preventing I-73 from going beyond Virginia.

On May 24, 2016, Ronald "Skip" Ressel Jr., president of the I-73 committee serving the Martinsville area, announced that he would not pursue building I-73 through his part of the state; a proposed corridor would follow the same general route, however, and be maintained by the Commonwealth of Virginia. This corridor, however, also faces local opposition. There have been no further public updates on I-73 and much of its funding has been used for other projects.

In a July 2024 presentation to the Commonwealth Transportation Board, which has ultimate authority over all transportation projects in the state, VDOT recommended the board rescind its original 2001 approval of I-73's routing. VDOT stated that the project's earmarked federal funding has been repurposed, and additional funding had not materialized and was unlikely to be found. At the September 2024 meeting, the project was suspended.

== Exit list ==
The exit list was the VDOT preferred corridor.

County	Location	mi	km	Exit	Destinations	Notes
Henry					I-73 south / US 220 south – Greensboro	Future continuation into North Carolina
Henry					US 220 north – Ridgeway	Future interchanges (unfunded)
Henry					SR 87 – Ridgeway, Eden	Future interchanges (unfunded)
Henry					US 58 west – Stuart	Future interchanges (unfunded)
Henry					SR 650 (Irisburg Road)	Existing interchange of US 58
Henry					US 58 / US 58 Bus. west – Danville, Martinsville	Future interchanges (unfunded)
Henry					SR 57 – Chatham	Future interchanges (unfunded)
Henry					SR 658 (Foxfire Road)	Future interchanges (unfunded)
Henry					SR 890 (Figsboro Road)	Future interchanges (unfunded)
Franklin					US 220 – Martinsville, Rocky Mount	Future interchanges (unfunded)
Franklin					SR 619 (Sontag Road)	Future interchanges (unfunded)
Franklin					SR 40 – Rocky Mount, Gretna	Future interchanges (unfunded)
Franklin					SR 635 (Bonbrock Mill Road)	Future interchanges (unfunded)
Franklin					SR 684 (Boones Mill Road)	Future interchanges (unfunded)
Roanoke					US 220 south – Rocky Mount	Future interchanges (unfunded)
City of Roanoke					To Blue Ridge Parkway	Future interchanges (unfunded)
City of Roanoke					US 220 Bus. north (Franklin Road) / SR 419 north – Salem	Existing interchanges of US 220
City of Roanoke					Wonju Street / Colonial Avenue / to Franklin Road	Existing interchanges of US 220
City of Roanoke					US 220 Bus. north (Franklin Road)	Existing interchanges of US 220
City of Roanoke					SR 24 (Elm Avenue) – Vinton	Existing interchanges of I-581/US 220
City of Roanoke					US 11 / US 220 Bus. / US 221 south – Downtown Roanoke	Existing interchanges of I-581/US 220
City of Roanoke					US 460 (Orange Avenue)	Existing interchanges of I-581/US 220
City of Roanoke					Valley View Boulevard – Airport	Existing interchanges of I-581/US 220
City of Roanoke					SR 101 (Hershberger Road) – Airport	Existing interchanges of I-581/US 220
City of Roanoke					SR 117 (Peters Creek Road)	Existing interchanges of I-581/US 220
Roanoke					I-81 / US 220 north – Salem, Bristol, Lexington	Existing interchanges of I-581/US 220
1.000 mi = 1.609 km; 1.000 km = 0.621 mi: Unopened

== See also ==
Interstate 73
Previous state: North Carolina	Virginia	Next state: West Virginia
