= Virginia State Route 221 =

The following highways in Virginia have been known as State Route 221 (SR 221):

- Virginia State Route 221 (1923–1928), spur of SR 22 (now SR 311) to Catawba Hospital
- Virginia State Route 221 (1930–1933), now SR 118
- U.S. Route 221 in Virginia (early 1930s – present)
