= Fairland, Roanoke, Virginia =

Neighborhood of Roanoke, Virginia

Coordinates: 37.3011°N 79.9717°W

Fairland is a Roanoke, Virginia neighborhood located in north, central Roanoke across Interstate 581, opposite Valley View Mall. It borders the neighborhoods of Miller Court/Arrowood and Villa Heights on the west and Roundhill and Melrose-Rugby on the east. As of the 2000 U.S. Census, Fairland has a population of 1,492 residents.

== History ==
Developed in an area formerly covered by farmland, the area is now predominantly residential in character. Nearly all of the structures in the area have been constructed since the 1950s with the majority being brick ranch-style in character.
