= Roundhill, Roanoke, Virginia =

Coordinates: 37°18′8.46″N 79°57′6.13″W

Roundhill is a Roanoke, Virginia neighborhood located in northwest Roanoke. It borders the neighborhoods of Airport on the north, Williamson Road on the south, Preston Park on the east, and Fairland, Melrose-Rugby and Washington Park on the west opposite Interstate 581.

== History ==
Annexed from Roanoke County in 1949, much of the residential development within the neighborhood reflects that of typical suburban development following World War Two. Today the neighborhood is the location of Huff Lane Elementary School, Roundhill Elementary School and Huff Lane Park. Additionally, the area has developed into a regional shopping destination with the opening of Valley View Mall in 1985.
