= South Jefferson, Roanoke, Virginia =

South Jefferson
- Roanoke Neighborhood
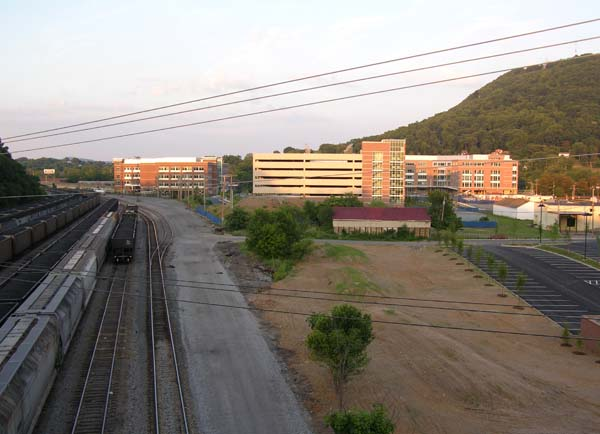
- Carilion Clinic campus and the Norfolk Southern Railway
- Interactive map of South Jefferson
- Coordinates: 37°15′14″N 79°56′38″W
- Country: United States
- State: Virginia
- City: Roanoke
- Elevation: 922 ft (281 m)
- Time zone: UTC-5 (EST)
  - Summer (DST): UTC-4 (EDT)
- ZIP Codes: 24016
- Area code: 540

South Jefferson is a Roanoke, Virginia neighborhood located in southeast Roanoke, surrounded roughly by the Roanoke River to the south and east and the Roy L. Webber Expressway to the west, centered on South Jefferson Street. It borders the neighborhoods of Old Southwest on the west, Belmont and Downtown on the north, and Riverland/Walnut Hills via the Walnut Street Bridge on the east.

== History ==
Historically serving various industrial activities, in May 2000 the South Jefferson area was identified as the South Jefferson Redevelopment Area by the City of Roanoke. The area is seeing significant redevelopment including the construction of the Carilion Clinic campus and the Virginia Tech Carilion School of Medicine.
