= Williamson Road, Roanoke, Virginia =

Coordinates: 37°16′56.2″N 79°56′0.4″W

Williamson Road is a Roanoke, Virginia neighborhood in north-central Roanoke. It borders the neighborhoods of Roundhill and Preston Park to the north, Belmont to the south, Hollins to the east, and Gainsboro and Washington Park to the west opposite Interstate 581. It is bisected by Williamson Road.

== History ==
The area that encompasses the Williamson Road was annexed from Roanoke County in two separate annexations, with the areas south of present-day U.S. 460 (Orange Avenue) annexed in 1882 and those north annexed in 1949. Much of the residential development within the neighborhood reflects that of typical suburban development following World War Two. Today the neighborhood is the location of the Roanoke Civic Center and Bowman Park.
