= Virginia State Route 101 =

State highway in Roanoke, Virginia, United States

State Route 101
- Hershberger Road

Route information
- Maintained by VDOT
- Length: 3.17 mi (5.10 km)
- Existed: 1969–present

Major junctions
- West end: SR 117 in Roanoke
- SR 116 in Roanoke; Future I-73 / I-581 / US 220 in Roanoke
- East end: US 11 in Roanoke

Location
- Country: United States
- State: Virginia
- Counties: City of Roanoke

Highway system
- Virginia Routes; Interstate; US; Primary; Secondary; Byways; History; HOT lanes
← SR 100	→ SR 102

State Route 101 (SR 101) is a primary state highway in the U.S. state of Virginia. Known as Hershberger Road, the state highway runs 3.17 miles (5.10 km) from SR 117 east to U.S. Route 11 (US 11) within Roanoke. SR 101 is a major east–west arterial on the north side of Roanoke, where it connects Interstate 581 (I-581) and US 220 with Roanoke–Blacksburg Regional Airport.

== Route description ==
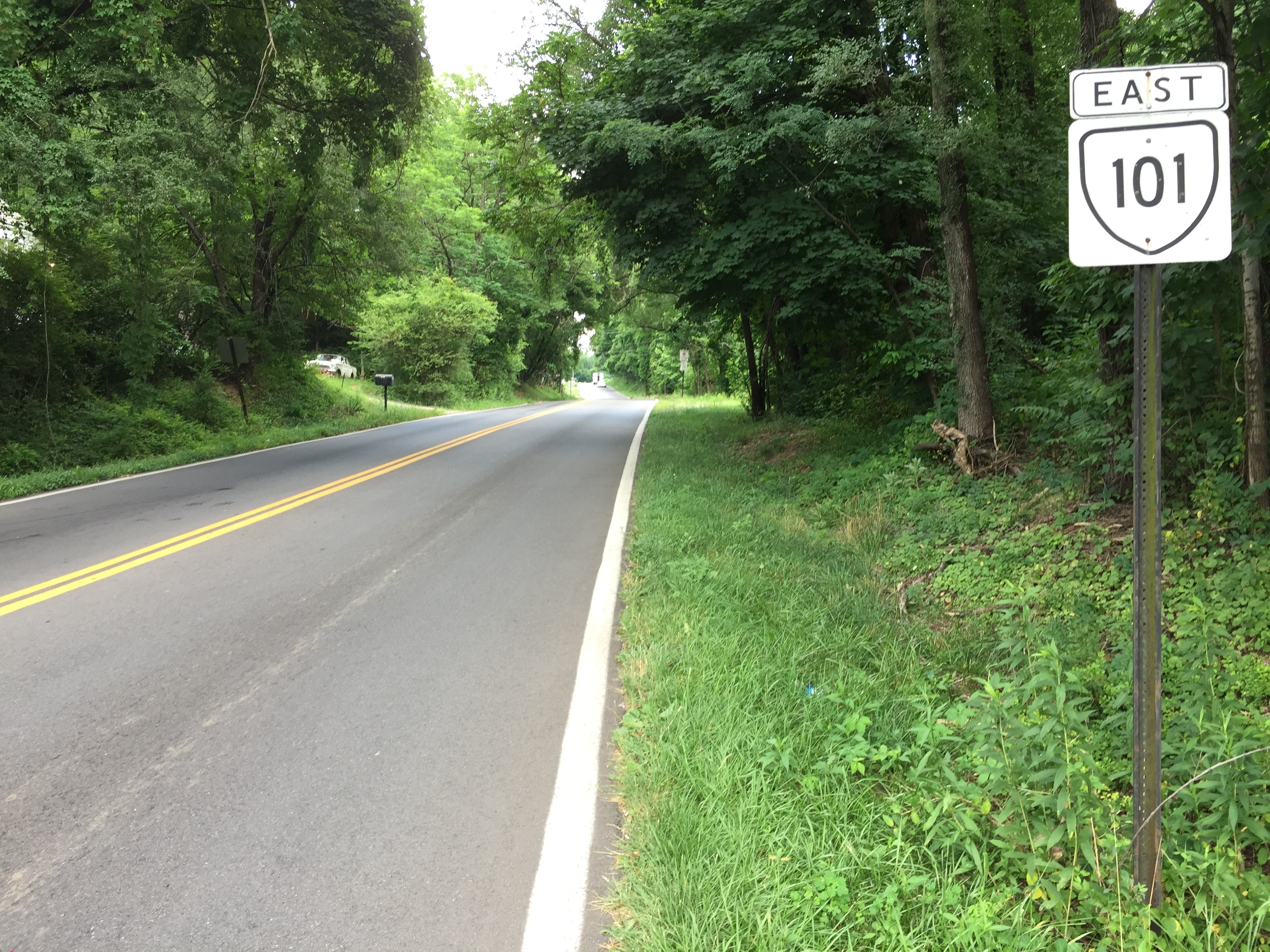
View east at the west end of SR 101 at SR 117 in Roanoke

SR 101 begins at an intersection with SR 117 (Peters Creek Road) in the northwestern part of the city of Roanoke. The state highway heads east as a two-lane undivided road between the Westview Terrace and Washington Heights neighborhoods. SR 101 expands to a six-lane divided highway just west of its intersection with Cove Road, which heads south as SR 116. The state highway curves northeast through a commercial area where it has a cloverleaf interchange with I-581 and US 220. SR 101 passes along the southern edge of the Roanoke Regional Airport property and has a partial cloverleaf interchange with the intersecting boulevard, which heads south as Valley View Boulevard toward the Valley View Mall and north as Aviation Drive to provide access to the airport. The interchange includes a flyover ramp from eastbound SR 101 to northbound Aviation Drive. The state highway continues east through another commercial area to its eastern terminus at US 11 (Williamson Road). Hershberger Road continues east as a two-lane undivided city street to the eastern city limits of Roanoke, where it continues into Roanoke County as SR 625 to SR 115 (Plantation Road).

== Major intersections ==
The entire route is in Roanoke.

mi	km	Destinations	Notes
0.00	0.00	SR 117 (Peters Creek Road) to US 11 – Roanoke, Salem	Western terminus
1.34	2.16	SR 116 south (Cove Road)	Northern terminus of SR 116
1.92	3.09	I-581 / US 220 – Lexington, Bristol, Downtown Roanoke	I-581 exit 3
2.42	3.89	Valley View Boulevard / Aviation Drive north – Airport	interchange
3.17	5.10	US 11 (Williamson Road)	Eastern terminus
1.000 mi = 1.609 km; 1.000 km = 0.621 mi
