= Morningside, Roanoke, Virginia =

Neighborhood of Roanoke, Virginia

Coordinates: 37°15′38.50″N 79°55′22.13″W

Morningside is a Roanoke, Virginia neighborhood located in east, central Roanoke, along the north bank of the Roanoke River. It borders the neighborhoods of South Jefferson and Riverland/Walnut Hills on the west, Kenwood and Riverdale on the east, Belmont on the north and both Garden City and Mill Mountain on the south. In being the location of the former American Viscose plant, the Morningside neighborhood exhibits both industrial characteristics as well as development patterns typical of those experienced for an American city during the early 20th century.
