= Norwich Historic District =

Historic district in Roanoke, Virginia, U.S.

- U.S. National Register of Historic Places
- U.S. Historic district
- Virginia Landmarks Register
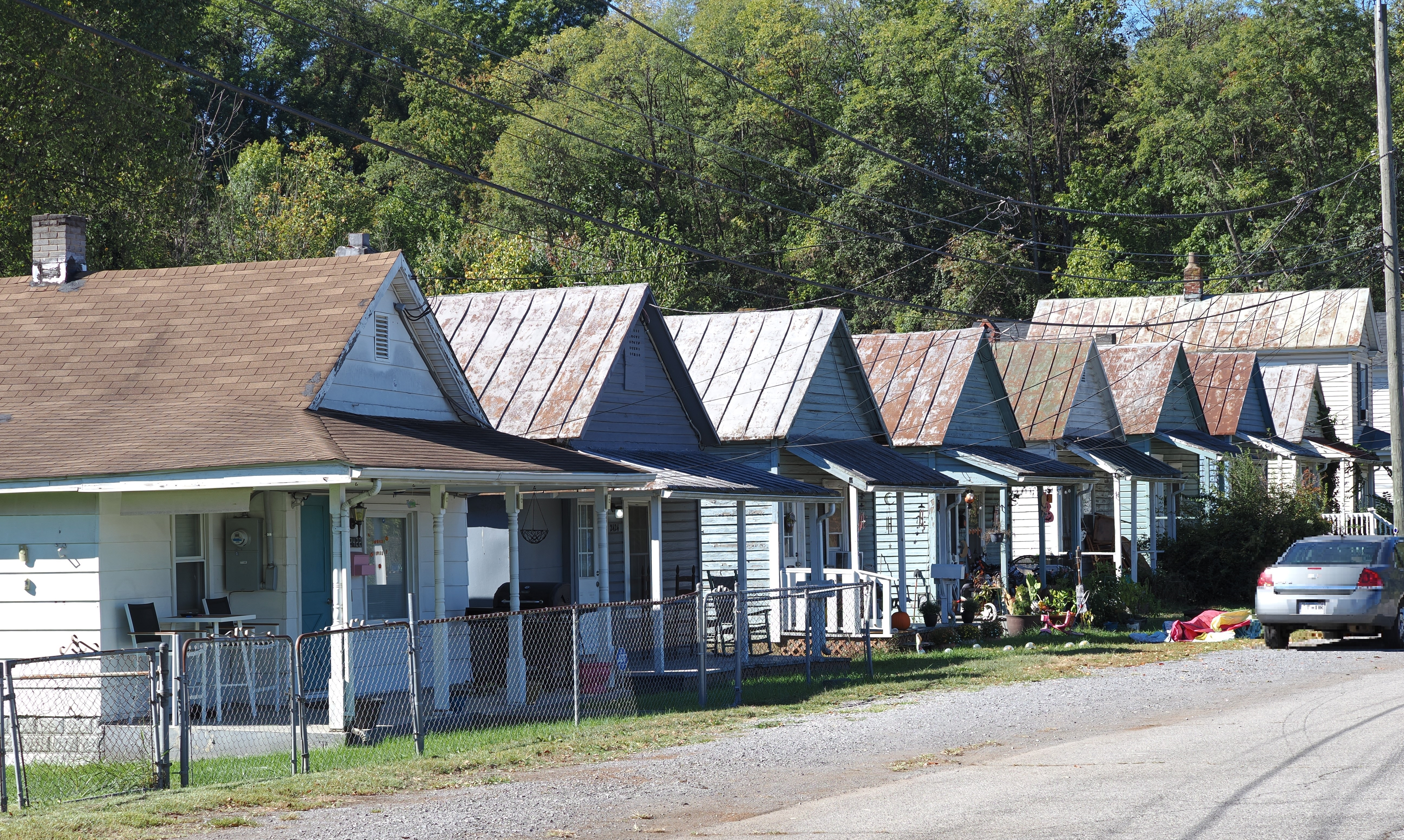
- Shotgun-style houses in the district

- Location within Virginia Location within the United States
- Location: 1815-2433 Roanoke Avenue SW, 614-920 Bridge Street SW, Penn Street SW, Russell Avenue SW, Buford Avenue SW, Charlevoix Court SW, Irvine Street SW, Warwick Street SW, Rolfe Street SW, Ashlawn Street SW, and Bedford Street SW, Roanoke, Virginia
- Coordinates: 37°16′13″N 79°58′34″W
- Area: 55 acres (22 ha)
- Built: 1890–1955
- Architectural style: Folk Victorian, Vernacular
- NRHP reference No.: 100010835
- VLR No.: 128-6478

Significant dates
- Added to NRHP: September 17, 2024
- Designated VLR: June 20, 2024

The Norwich Historic District is located in the southwest section of Roanoke, Virginia, US. It consists of 55 acres (22 ha) of primarily residential housing and industrial buildings and is situated immediately south of the Roanoke River and west of the city's downtown. The district's historical significance dates to the 1890 establishment of the Roanoke Development Company, a real estate firm that developed the neighborhood and lured industry to the area. One such factory was the Norwich Lock Company, which along with later area businesses built housing for its employees. The majority of these houses, many of which are near-identical shotgun-style cottages, still stand in the 21st century. The district is the only intact collection of late-1800s workers' housing in the city and a rare extant example in the American South. It consists of 116 contributing resources including two sites and one structure, and was listed on the National Register of Historic Places in 2024.

== Geography ==
The district is located immediately south of the Roanoke River and about two miles to the west of downtown Roanoke. The river, which is obscured from view by trees in much of the district, forms its northern border while a pronounced ridge forms the southern. The eastern and western boundaries are each made by Roanoke Avenue as it ascends out of the location's bowl-shaped topography. These natural features combine with the area's lower elevation relative to its surroundings to create an isolated setting that contributes to the neighborhood's historic cohesiveness.

== History ==
=== Pre-20th century ===
The lowlands where present-day Norwich is located were used as farmland prior to the land boom that followed the founding of the City of Roanoke. Historic deeds termed the area "Turkey Bottom", presumably due to a significant wild turkey population. Following the 1883 location of the headquarters of the Norfolk and Western Railway in the area, Roanoke grew at a rapid enough rate to earn the nickname "The Magic City", and by 1890, land speculation was widespread in the city. In October of that year, the Roanoke Development Company was chartered with $1.1 million in capital, of which $500,000 was earmarked for purchasing land and the rest for the purpose of bringing industry to it. The company bought 1,300 acres southwest of the city and had platted the Turkey Bottom area by the end of 1891. Bridges and roads were built, and the company was also successful in having streetcar service extended to the neighborhood.

The first industrial firm to locate to the district was the Norwich Lock Company, formerly of Norwich, Connecticut. The company was looking to move closer to its source of iron and coal, and after touring multiple locations in the South, ultimately chose Roanoke. The venture became a victim of the Panic of 1893, and though it closed after only two years of operation in Roanoke, the area has been named for it since. Other firms to move to the area in its first years of development were the Duvall Engine Works and the Bridgewater Carriage Works.

The Norwich Lock facility was unoccupied until 1899, when it was taken over by the Roanoke Cotton Mill Company, which operated at the site until being purchased in 1910. The cotton mill continued the lock company's practice of building housing for its employees. Norwich Lock had built at least fifty houses by 1893, and the cotton mill had built "rows of cottages" in the neighborhood by the early 1900s. These houses were typically small and built using common plans, and were designed primarily in the pyramidal and shotgun cottage varieties of the Folk National style. The few Folk Victorian houses in the district were likely built for managers of the neighborhood's industry.

Due to the 1893 economic downturn and subsequent closure of Norwich Lock, some of the unoccupied cottages were relocated to other locations in Roanoke and sold at a profit. These relocations explain the number of empty lots in the neighborhood, along with the fact that the Roanoke Development Company optimistically reserved some lots assuming their worth would increase as the area developed.

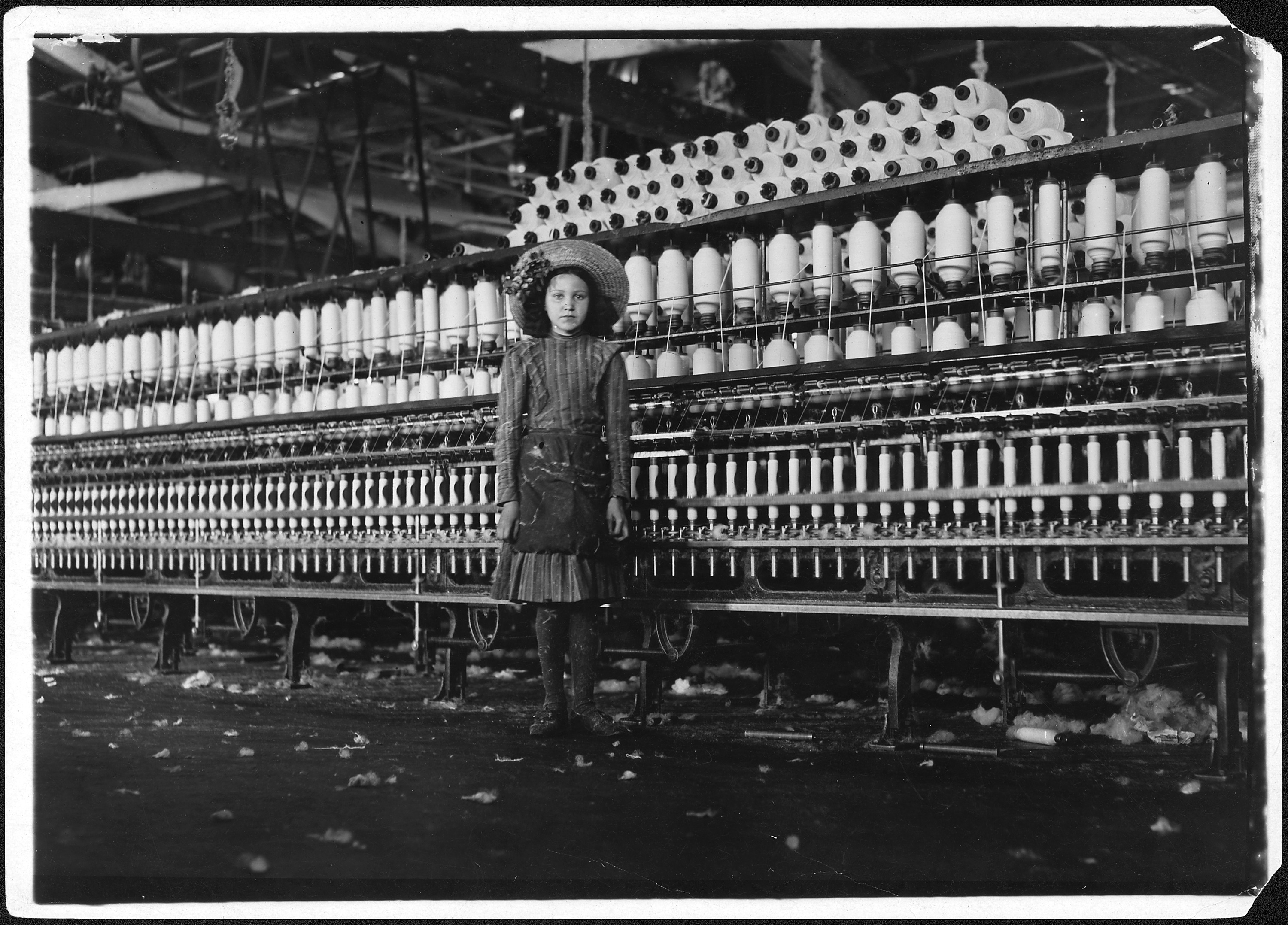
A Roanoke Cotton Mills employee photographed by Lewis Hine

=== 1900s to present ===
Norwich's mill was the subject of scrutiny early in the 20th century. As part of an investigation into child labor by the National Child Labor Committee, the photographer Lewis Hine came to the Roanoke business in 1911 to document cases of violations of Virginia's law, which limited employment to those at least fourteen years old (though children of dependent parents could work as soon as twelve). Many of the subjects of Hine's photographs, who were frequently barefoot and working with dangerous equipment, gave their ages as fourteen despite often appearing much younger. The following year a state inspector visited and cited the mill's manager along with the parents of four children for violation of the labor law.

Norwich was not provided much assistance by local government. In its early years it was part of Roanoke County, but as that municipality considered the neighborhood under the aegis of Roanoke City, "Norwichians were disowned and neglected by both", according to a local historian. The area was eventually annexed by the city in 1919, but the district was still without water and sewer services for years afterwards.

Fluctuating economic circumstances continued to affect the area during the first half of the 20th century. Following the closure of the cotton mill, a twine mill opened in the facility in 1911 and operated with varying ownership and at varying levels of capacity until closing in 1928. The buildings had numerous owners afterwards, but various plans to fully inhabit the location never succeeded and the site was razed in the mid-20th century. The Duvall Engine Works, Bridgewater Carriage Works, and later firms such as the Acme Match Company and Crystal Springs Soap Company were major employers for the neighborhood but did not enjoy significant longevity.

One business that did see long-term success was the Harris Hardwood Company, which had opened by 1919 and whose 1955 construction of an office building marks the end of the district's period of historical significance. During its existence the firm survived fire and several instances of the Roanoke River cresting its banks, only to finally cease production following the crippling flood of 1985. Another long-lasting company in the district was the Walker Machine and Foundry Corporation. That firm built its Norwich factory in 1920 and did not close until nearly a century later in the midst of a legal battle with Roanoke City. The city had long been trying to extend its Roanoke River greenway system through the district and needed a 30-foot-wide (9.1 m) stretch of land at the edge of the Walker property. The foundry was concerned that such a transaction would cause them to lose their air quality permit which they held only through a grandfather clause. The Walker foundry closed in 2019, and the company alleged in a lawsuit that the dispute with the city and its threat to use eminent domain to acquire the land were the cause of the closure. The two parties settled in 2020 with Walker receiving $750,000 and a railroad spur and Roanoke City receiving nearly five acres of property. The Norwich stretch of the greenway opened in 2023.

The district was listed on the National Register of Historic Places in 2024. It comprises 116 contributing resources which include two sites and one structure. The historical integrity of the district has remained largely intact into the 21st century, particularly with regards to its residential resources. The workers' cottages are a notable example of late-19th and early-20th century mill employee housing (only 21 homes in the district have been constructed post-1920), and there are no other such collections of housing extant in Roanoke and very few in the region. While many of the area's original industrial resources no longer exist, others have been built in their place.

== See also ==
- National Register of Historic Places listings in Roanoke, Virginia
