= Peachtree/Norwood, Roanoke, Virginia =

Coordinates: 37°18′22.49″N 80°0′57.17″W

Peachtree/Norwood is a Roanoke, Virginia neighborhood located in far northwest Roanoke. It borders the neighborhoods of Edgewood-Summit Hills on the south, Washington Heights and Westview Terrace on the east, Roanoke County on the north and the City of Salem on the west. The neighborhood is predominantly residential in character throughout its central area with commercial development along both its U.S. 460 (Melrose Avenue) and Virginia State Route 117 (Peters Creek Road) frontages. Its development patterns typical of those experienced for an American city during the mid-20th century with low-density housing.
