= Norwich, Roanoke, Virginia =

Norwich
- Roanoke Neighborhood
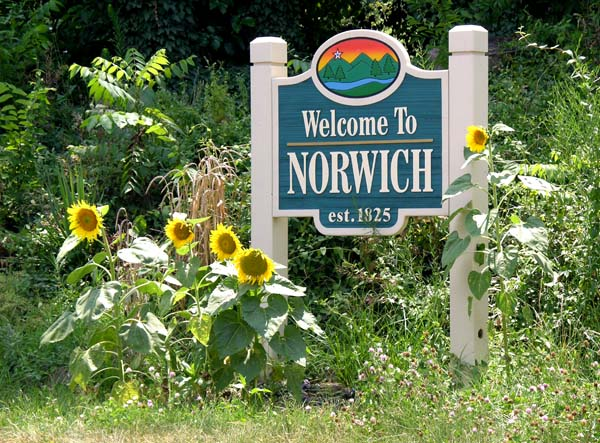
- Welcome signage off Memorial Avenue
- Interactive map of Norwich
- Coordinates: 37°16′12″N 79°58′39″W
- Country: United States
- State: Virginia
- City: Roanoke
- Elevation: 958 ft (292 m)
- Time zone: UTC-5 (EST)
  - Summer (DST): UTC-4 (EDT)
- ZIP Codes: 24015
- Area code: 540

Norwich is a Roanoke, Virginia neighborhood located in west central Roanoke, immediately south of the Roanoke River. It borders the neighborhoods of Mountain View on the east, and Raleigh Court on the south. The northern and western reaches of the neighborhood are bound by the Roanoke River, without crossings into both Hurt Park and Cherry Hill across the river. As of the 2000 U.S. Census, Norwich has a population of 652 residents.

== History ==
The origins of Norwich trace to the establishment of the first permanent home in 1825. By the 1880s, the area developed as an industrial village, with foundries and factories such as, the Norwich Twine Mill and the Harris Hardwood Company. Annexed to Roanoke in 1919, the area since the 1960s has remained primarily residential in character, with some areas of industrial infill on the periphery. Most homes in the Norwich community were built in 1900. Formed in 1996, the Norwich Neighborhood Alliance serves as the citizen advocacy group for the neighborhood. A portion of the neighborhood, the Norwich Historic District, was listed on the National Register of Historic Places in 2024.
