= Preston Park, Roanoke, Virginia =

Neighborhood of Roanoke, Virginia

Coordinates: 37°18′53″N 79°56′31″W

Preston Park is a neighborhood located in northeast Roanoke, Virginia. It borders the neighborhoods of Williamson Road on the south, Monterey and Hollins on the east, and Roundhill and the Airport on the west. The northern border is shared with Roanoke County. The name of the neighborhood reflects the fact that the large park of the same name is located within the neighborhood.

== History ==
Annexed from Roanoke County in 1949, much of the residential development within the neighborhood reflects that of typical suburban development following World War Two. Today the neighborhood is the location of Monterey Elementary School, Preston Park Elementary School, James Breckinridge Middle School, Preston Park and Andrews Park.
