= Fallon, Roanoke, Virginia =

Neighborhood of Roanoke, Virginia

Coordinates: 37°16′23″N 79°54′50″W

Fallon is a Roanoke, Virginia neighborhood located in southeast Roanoke. It borders the neighborhoods of Hollins on the north, Kenwood to the south, and Belmont on the west. The eastern and part of the northern border is shared with the town of Vinton. Today the neighborhood is bisected by Virginia State Route 24 (Dale Avenue) and is bordered by Tinker Creek to the east.

== History ==
Originally established as a neighborhood serving workers of the neighboring Roanoke Shops, the majority of the development in Fallon dates from between the 1890s and 1950s. The Southeast Action Forum serves as the citizen advocacy group for the neighborhood, and today Fallon is both the location of Fallon Park and the Fallon Park Elementary School.
