= Virginia State Route 118 =

State highway in Virginia, US known as Airport Rd

State Route 118
- Airport Road

Route information
- Maintained by VDOT
- Length: 1.84 mi (2.96 km)
- Existed: July 1, 1933–present

Major junctions
- South end: US 11 in Roanoke
- North end: SR 117 in Hollins

Location
- Country: United States
- State: Virginia
- Counties: City of Roanoke, Roanoke

Highway system
- Virginia Routes; Interstate; US; Primary; Secondary; Byways; History; HOT lanes
← SR 117	→ SR 119

State Route 118 (SR 118) is a state highway in the U.S. state of Virginia. Known as Airport Road, the state highway runs 1.84 miles (2.96 km) from U.S. Route 11 (US 11) in Roanoke north to SR 117 in Hollins. SR 118 provides supplemental access to Roanoke Regional Airport, whose primary access road is Aviation Drive, which is more directly connected with SR 101, Interstate 581, and US 220.

== Route description ==
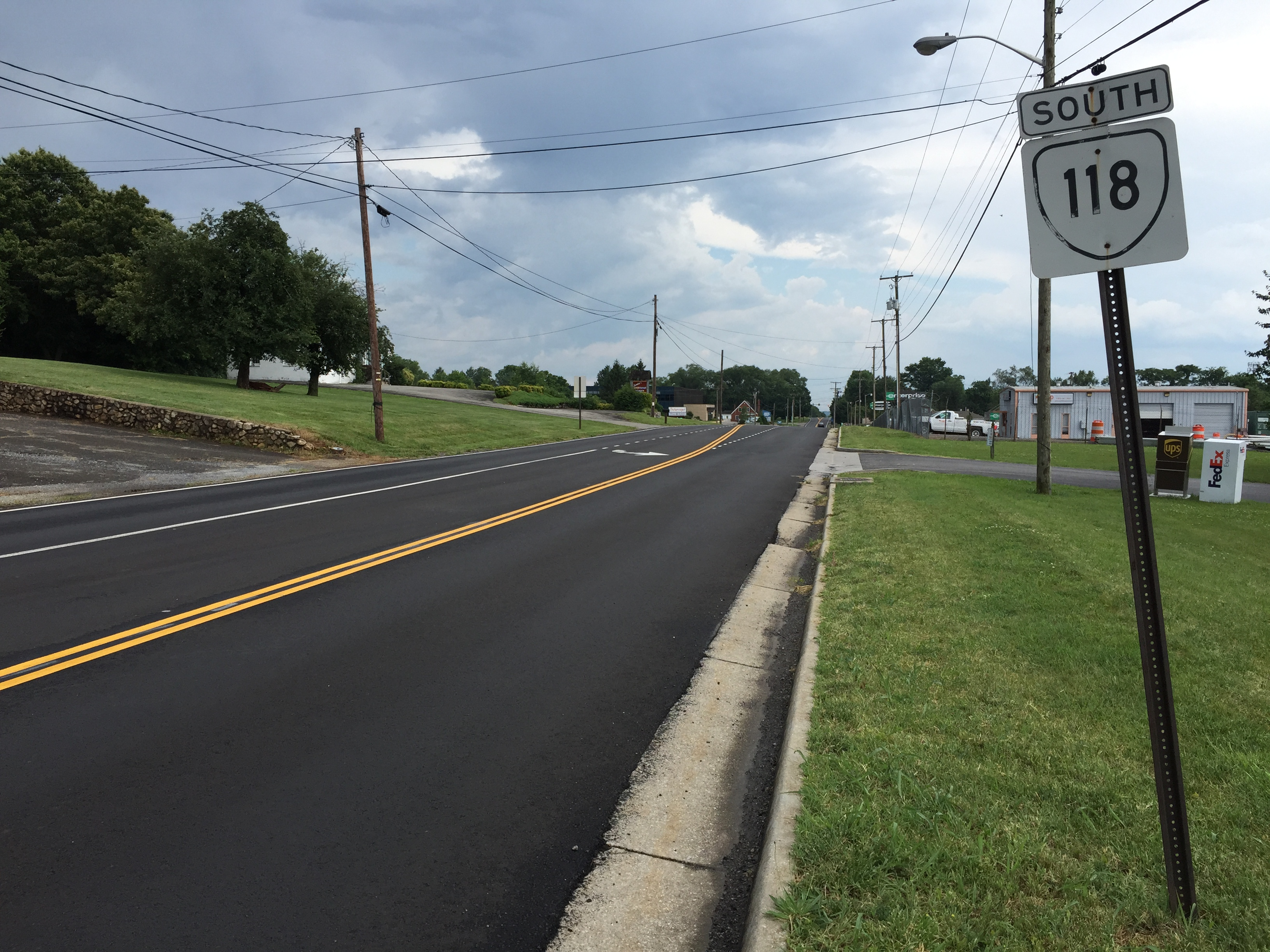
View south along SR 118 at Municipal Road in Roanoke

SR 118 begins at an intersection with US 11 (Williamson Road) just north of US 11's intersection with SR 101 (Hershberger Road). The state highway heads north as a two-lane undivided road between a shopping center to the west and a residential area to the east. SR 118 continues through an industrial area to the east of Roanoke Regional Airport and intersects Municipal Road, which leads to Aviation Drive, the road that serves the airport terminal. The state highway curves northeast and descends into a tunnel that passes under the airport's east–west runway. At the north end of the tunnel, SR 118 enters Roanoke County, passes through a residential area, and reaches its northern terminus at SR 117 (Peters Creek Road) on the west side of Hollins.

== Major intersections ==
County	Location	mi	km	Destinations	Notes
City of Roanoke		0.00	0.00	US 11 (Williamson Road)	Southern terminus
Roanoke	Hollins	1.84	2.96	SR 117 (Peters Creek Road) to US 11 / US 460	Northern terminus
1.000 mi = 1.609 km; 1.000 km = 0.621 mi

< SR 220	District 2 State Routes; 1928–1933	SR 222 >
