= Villa Heights, Roanoke, Virginia =

Coordinates: 37.2958°N 79.9711°W

Villa Heights is a Roanoke, Virginia neighborhood located in northwest Roanoke north of U.S. 460 (Melrose Avenue). It borders the neighborhoods of Washington Heights on the west, Melrose-Rugby on the east, Fairland, Miller Court/Arrowood and Westview Terrace on the north and Shenandoah West and South Washington Heights on the south. As of the 2000 U.S. Census, Villa Heights has a population of 2,840 residents.

== History ==
Originally subdivided in 1910 as one of Roanoke's early suburbs, the character of Villa Heights shifts from that of a traditional turn of the century neighborhood to that of typical suburban. The neighborhood takes its name from Villa Heights, an early 19th century Federal and Classical revival house originally owned by Elijah McClanahan. Today, Villa Heights is the location of the Roanoke Country Club and Villa Heights Park.
