= Mecca Gardens, Roanoke, Virginia =

Coordinates: 37°17′47″N 79°53′24″W

Mecca Gardens is a Roanoke, Virginia neighborhood and is the most eastern neighborhood within the city limits It borders the neighborhoods of Wildwood on the west, Eastgate on the north across Orange Avenue, the town of Vinton on the south and Roanoke County on the east.

== History ==
Originally included as part of Roanoke County, Mecca Gardens was annexed by the city in 1976. Growth within the neighborhood has been suburban in nature since the 1970s with significant commercial development located along its U.S. Route 460 (Orange Avenue) frontage.
