= Miller Court/Arrowood, Roanoke, Virginia =

Coordinates: 37°19′3.49″N 79°59′46.14″W

Miller Court/Arrowood is a Roanoke, Virginia neighborhood located in northwest Roanoke, bound to the east by Interstate 581. It borders the neighborhoods of Westview Terrace on the west, Fairland on the south, Airport on the east and Roanoke County on the north. The neighborhood sees both a mix of residential and commercial development throughout its area. Its development patterns typical of those experienced for an American city during the mid-20th century with low-density housing and commercial developments along its Virginia State Route 117 (Peters Creek Road) frontage.

Today the area is noted as being the location of both William Fleming High School and William Ruffner Middle School.
