= Wildwood, Roanoke, Virginia =

Coordinates: 37°17′7″N 79°54′47″W

Wildwood is a neighborhood in eastern Roanoke, Virginia, in the United States. It lies along U.S. 460 (Orange Avenue) and is bordered by the neighborhoods of Hollins on the west, Mecca Gardens on the east, Eastgate on the north, and the town of Vinton to the south. Originally included as part of Roanoke County, Wildwood was annexed by the city in 1976. Predominantly rural prior to its annexation, growth within the neighborhood has been suburban in nature since the 1970s with significant commercial development located along its Orange Avenue frontage.
