= Ridgewood Park, Roanoke, Virginia =

Neighborhood in Roanoke, Virginia, US

Coordinates: 37°17′15.49″N 80°1′7.14″W

Ridgewood Park is a Roanoke, Virginia neighborhood located in far western Roanoke. It borders the neighborhoods of Edgewood-Summit Hills on the north, Cherry Hill on the south and Wilmont on the east. The western border is shared with the city of Salem.

== History ==
Annexed by the city from Roanoke County in 1949, Ridgewood Park is primarily residential in nature. The area features both traditional and suburban characteristics.
