= Cherry Hill, Roanoke, Virginia =

Neighborhood of western Roanoke in Virginia, United States

Coordinates: 37°16′33.49″N 80°0′24.14″W

Cherry Hill is a Roanoke, Virginia neighborhood located in far western Roanoke. It borders the neighborhoods of Ridgewood Park and Wilmont on the north, Greater Deyerle, Raleigh Court, Norwich and Hurt Park to the south and Shenandoah West on the east. The western border is shared with the city of Salem. Today the neighborhood is bisected by Virginia State Route 117 (Peters Creek Road) and is bordered by the Norfolk Southern Railway right of way on the south.

== Early history ==
Annexed by the city from Roanoke County in 1976, the oldest concentration of structures dating from the late 1950s can be found in the Northwestern section of the neighborhood. The further one travels South and East along Cherryhill Rd. and Frances Dr., construction dates for houses enter into the 1960s.

Neighborhoods that immediately neighbor Cherry Hill Park (the original name of the development) include Wilmont Farms, Signal Hill (now a defunct neighborhood name), and Boulevard Estates. Cherry Hill also bordered the VA Medical Center property prior to the extension of Peters Creek Road. The neighborhood was developed with a single entrance on Shenandoah Avenue. The original entrance was moved to a new entrance East of the original entrance as a result of the Peters Creek extension project. The neighborhood was originally physically isolated from any other neighborhoods. A rough dirt path did allow one to have walking access to Westside Boulevard.

Upon inquiry in great detail with the City of Roanoke, it is now known that no detailed documentation was transferred from the County to the City during annexation and Roanoke City officials have admitted to not actually knowing the early history of the neighborhood; however, many of the first residents of the neighborhood were still alive at the time this entry was submitted and they retain the details related to the beginning history, and even the pre-history, of this neighborhood.

The document titled "Peters Creek South Neighborhood Plan", adopted by city council on October 17, 2005 is grossly in error in reporting 'facts' about the neighborhood. Many errors within the city's GIS database were reported to the city prior to this date; however, the City of Roanoke has chosen to not correct their records regarding this neighborhood.

Two structures were known to exist prior to the development of the neighborhood:

1.) A two-story frame house at the top of "Cherry Hill", dating from the early 20th century, and

2.) A beautiful two-story brick hotel constructed by the N&W Railway in the 1800s, located at the end of Cherryhill Circle.

Before the annexation, the neighborhood was situated between the City of Salem and the City of Roanoke --- within the small strip of Roanoke County that separated the two cities. The neighborhood attracted new residents from the older developments of Boulevard Estates, Ridgewood Park, and other nearby neighborhoods as an opportunity to step up to a better and larger home. The neighborhood attracted many workers from the nearby General Electric plant in Salem, VA (which opened in 1956); however, the original residents were employed by many Roanoke area companies and institutions.

== Development ==
Cherry Hill Park was developed by Byron Lewis (BL) Radford beginning in 1956 or 1957.

The great majority of the homes built in the late 1950s were a single-story Rambler ('Ranch' is preferred in the local vernacular) with three bedrooms (sometimes used as a configuration of two bedrooms and a den as the third bedroom was small), a kitchen with adjoining dining area, a living room, and a single bathroom. The Ranch homes include a full basement.

Some early homes in the development include Split-Level styles as well as L-shaped Ranch styles. Homes built at later dates in the development include Splanch-style homes (sometimes referred to as 'Splachers' in this region of the country).

All Ranch-style homes are constructed in brick and are based on variations of two floor plans. Some of the Ranch homes also include a covered carport and some basements extend beneath the carport. Split level homes were faced in brick in combination with wood siding. All homes include a driveway. Splanch-style homes are faced with mostly wood siding and some brick.

In the earliest beginnings of the neighborhood, Mr. Radford was building homes 'to order' as quickly as possible to fulfill the demand of home so many new home purchases. The rush to complete homes did have some negative impact as essential steps in construction were missed in some homes causing structural defects that became evident a few years later.

While individual owners were waiting for construction to be completed, they would often visit with the constructions crews and request special favors such as swapping kitchen cabinetry (deemed to be made of better hardwoods) from other incomplete homes.

Mr. Radford had two daughters, named Nancy and Frances. Nancy Drive and Nancy Circle were named after daughter, Nancy, while Frances Drive was named after Frances.

== Annexation and the Tensions of the 1970s ==
Roanoke City and the City of Salem never shared a common border until the annexation of 1976. The small strip of Roanoke County separating the two cities was closed in the final Roanoke City annexation. Annexation is no longer allowed in Virginia.

The news of annexation had a tremendous effect on many residents in that they did not want to be a resident of Roanoke City or send their children to Roanoke City schools (then as now deemed to be inferior to Roanoke County schools). When notice was given that the Commonwealth approved the act, which was far in advance of the official day that Cherry Hill Park became a part of Roanoke City, many residents made plans to move. By the mid-1970s a large number of houses were on the market or had already been sold. It should not be assumed that the annexation itself was the sole cause in the forthcoming mass exodus of neighborhood residents.

As the 1970s began, typically all-Caucasian neighborhoods bordering Cherry Hill, namely Wilmont Farms, Signal Hill, and the Westside Blvd. NW area, were seeing a building influx of African-American residents. For a region of the country where school segregation did not end until 1973, the Roanoke Valley showed, by example, how communities in such a region maintained almost absolute borders between White and Black sections and neighborhoods. The 1970s became a time where borders based on race began to be 'Gray'. Many Cherry Hill residents jointly discussed the influx of 'minorities' in surrounding neighborhoods with great alarm as police presence based on nefarious activity did increase in these neighborhoods. Cherry Hill residents discussed their anxiety of feeling unsafe.

When the first African-American moved into Cherry Hill, he did not stay long as petty acts of vandalism on his property were committed repeatedly. The second African-American resident also suffered such acts of vandalism, but, stuck it out and stayed put for many years.

== Exodus of the neighborhood ==
By the 1975 to 1976 time frame, the exodus of Whites began. Houses put up for sale did not sell quickly. It is true that some residents preferred to sell their homes only to Whites; however many homes took several years to be sold. By 1977, many residents were so eager to move away, they began to actually state that they no longer cared who they sold their house to. In effect, they gave up trying to 'save the neighborhood'.

Those that moved in the exodus in just a short span of time relocated to either Roanoke County or the City of Salem. It is known that a very small number relocated to Botetourt County.

For those that could not move before Labor Day of 1977, children of neighborhood parents that remained were required to now attend Roanoke City Schools. For those High School Students who had attended Andrew Lewis High School in Salem, they would now Attend William Fleming High School in Roanoke City. For those Junior High School Students that had attended Salem Intermediate School, they would now attend Lucy Addison Junior High School in Roanoke City.

Of course, many families were able to sell their homes and move out of Cherry Hill (Roanoke City) while children were attending Roanoke City Schools.

== Cherry Hill Park Today ==
From the 1970s, Cherry Hill Park has followed a course of decay. Even well before the recession of 2007 to 2013, the condition of the homes, lawns, and streets, have shown the signs of a continual lack of maintenance.

Although at the time this article was written research showed that the City of Roanoke had no plans for revitalization, it would be best to inquire with the City to be sure if such plans do or do not exist. It is a traditional course for the city to allow the overwhelming number of neighborhoods in the city (not all, but most) to decay without positive leadership to reverse what has been a persistent problem.
