= Hollins, Roanoke, Virginia =

Neighborhood in the U.S. state of Virginia

Coordinates: 37.341°N 79.943°W

Hollins is a Roanoke, Virginia neighborhood located in eastern Roanoke, immediately to the west of Tinker Creek. It borders the neighborhoods of Preston Park and Williamson Road on the west, Monterey, Eastgate and Wildwood on the east across Tinker Creek, and Fallon on the south. Its public education is at Northside High School. The extreme southeast corner of the neighborhood also is bounded by the town of Vinton. This neighborhood should not be confused with the Census Designated Place called Hollins in Roanoke County.

== History ==
Originally included as part of Roanoke County, Hollins was annexed by the city in 1976. Growth within the neighborhood has been suburban in nature since the 1970s with significant commercial development located along its U.S. Route 460 (Orange Avenue) frontage.
