= Shenandoah West, Roanoke, Virginia =

Coordinates: 37°17′6″N 79°58′57″W

Shenandoah West is a Roanoke, Virginia neighborhood located in west Roanoke south of U.S. 460 (Melrose Avenue). It borders the neighborhoods of South Washington Heights, Wilmont and Cherry Hill on the west, Loudon-Melrose on the east, Villa Heights on the north and Hurt Park on the south opposite the Norfolk Southern rail yard.

== History ==
The Shenandoah West neighborhood had developed since the mid-20th century and is dominated by industrial uses at its southern fringe with the remainder of residential and commercial development typical of that of contemporary suburban. The area is also the location of the Lansdowne and Melrose Towers public housing projects.
