= Monterey, Roanoke, Virginia =

Neighborhood in the U.S. state of Virginia

Coordinates: 37.311156°N 79.920049°W

Monterey is a neighborhood located in northeastern Roanoke, Virginia, in the United States. It is the most northeastern neighborhood within the city. It is bordered by the neighborhoods of Preston Park on the west, Eastgate on the east, Hollins on the south, and by Roanoke County to the north. Originally included as part of Roanoke County, Wildwood was annexed by the city in 1976. Predominantly rural prior to its annexation, growth within the neighborhood has been suburban in nature since the 1970s.
