= Garden City, Roanoke, Virginia =

Coordinates: 37°13′54.52″N 79°55′42.14″W

Garden City is a Roanoke, Virginia neighborhood located far southeast Roanoke, abutting Mill Mountain. It borders the neighborhoods of Morningside and Riverdale on the north, and Mill Mountain and Southern Hills to the west. The eastern border is shared with Roanoke County. As of the 2000 U.S. Census, Garden City has a population of 2,981 residents.

== History ==
Annexed by the city in 1949, development of Garden City can be traced to the establishment of the American Viscose Plant along the Roanoke River in 1917. Initially remaining relatively rural in nature, after the annexation rapid suburbanization occurred within the area giving it its current appearance with the majority of the built environment dating from the 1950s and 60s.
