= Edgewood-Summit Hills, Roanoke, Virginia =

Coordinates: 37°17′31.49″N 80°1′0.14″W

Edgewood-Summit Hills is a Roanoke, Virginia neighborhood located in far western Roanoke. It borders the neighborhoods of Peachtree/Norwood on the north, Ridgewood Park on the south and South Washington Heights on the east. The western border is shared with the city of Salem and Roanoke County.

== History ==
Annexed by the city from Roanoke County in 1976, Edgewood-Summit Hills is historically one of the oldest places of settlement in the Roanoke Valley. Established in 1769, the German settlement known as New Antrim was developed in the vicinity of present-day Edgewood-Summit Hills. Built in 1800 and demolished in 1999 in spite of local preservation efforts, the Howbert House was part of the original New Antrim, and at the time of its demolition was one of the oldest and rarest recorded buildings in Roanoke.

Today the neighborhood features suburban development patterns, with the majority of structures built during the 1950s through 1960. The Edgewood-Morwanda-Summit Hills Neighborhood Organization serves as the neighborhood advocacy group.
