= South Washington Heights, Roanoke, Virginia =

Neighborhood in Roanoke, Virginia, United States of America

Coordinates: 37.292130°N 80.000180°W

South Washington Heights is a neighborhood in Roanoke, Virginia, located in far western Roanoke. It borders the neighborhoods of Washington Heights and Villa Heights on the north, Wilmont on the south, Shenandoah West on the east and Edgewood-Summit Hills on the west. The neighborhood fronts U.S. Highway 460 (Melrose Avenue) along its entire northern boundary.

== History ==
Annexed by the city from Roanoke County in 1976, South Washington Heights has a mixture of commercial and residential developments. Today, the neighborhood is noted for the three cemeteries (Fairview, Saint Andrews and Williams Memorial), which occupy 30 percent of the total land area, and Williams Memorial Park.
