= Riverland/Walnut Hills, Roanoke, Virginia =

Coordinates: 37°15′28″N 79°56′5″W

Riverland/Walnut Hills is a Roanoke, Virginia neighborhood located in southeast Roanoke south of the Roanoke River. It borders the neighborhoods of South Jefferson and South Roanoke on the west, Morningside on the east and Mill Mountain on the south. The neighborhood is divided into the Walnut Hill area at the base of Mill Mountain, and the Riverland area along the Roanoke River, with Virginia State Route 116 running through the entire area. As of the 2000 U.S. Census, Riverland/Walnut Hills has a population of 1,033.

== History ==
With its oldest home dating from 1885, the initial wave development within Riverland/Walnut Hills occurred in the 1920s with many homes constructed in the Arts and Crafts Bungalow and the American Foursquare styles. The Woman's Civic Betterment Club also worked with city planner John Nolen on the Riverland/Walnut Hills, Roanoke, Virginia neighborhood in promoting sanitation and overcrowding. At the turn of the century, the WCBC was concerned that in 1907-1912, Riverland housed railway workers and their families, and contributed to overcrowding and unhealthy tenement conditions.

After a period of slowdown, construction would once again pick-up in the 1940s-50s with many structures constructed in the Cottage and Ranch styles.
