= Riverdale, Roanoke, Virginia =

Neighborhood of Roanoke, Virginia

Coordinates: 37°15′18.50″N 79°54′50.13″W

Riverdale is a neighborhood in southeast Roanoke, Virginia, in the United States. The neighborhood lies along the south bank of the Roanoke River. It is bordered by the neighborhoods of Morningside on the west, Kenwood on the north, Garden City on the south and the town of Vinton on the east. The neighborhood is predominantly residential in character, and its development patterns are typical of those experienced for an American city during the early to mid-20th century.
