= Valley View Mall (Virginia) =

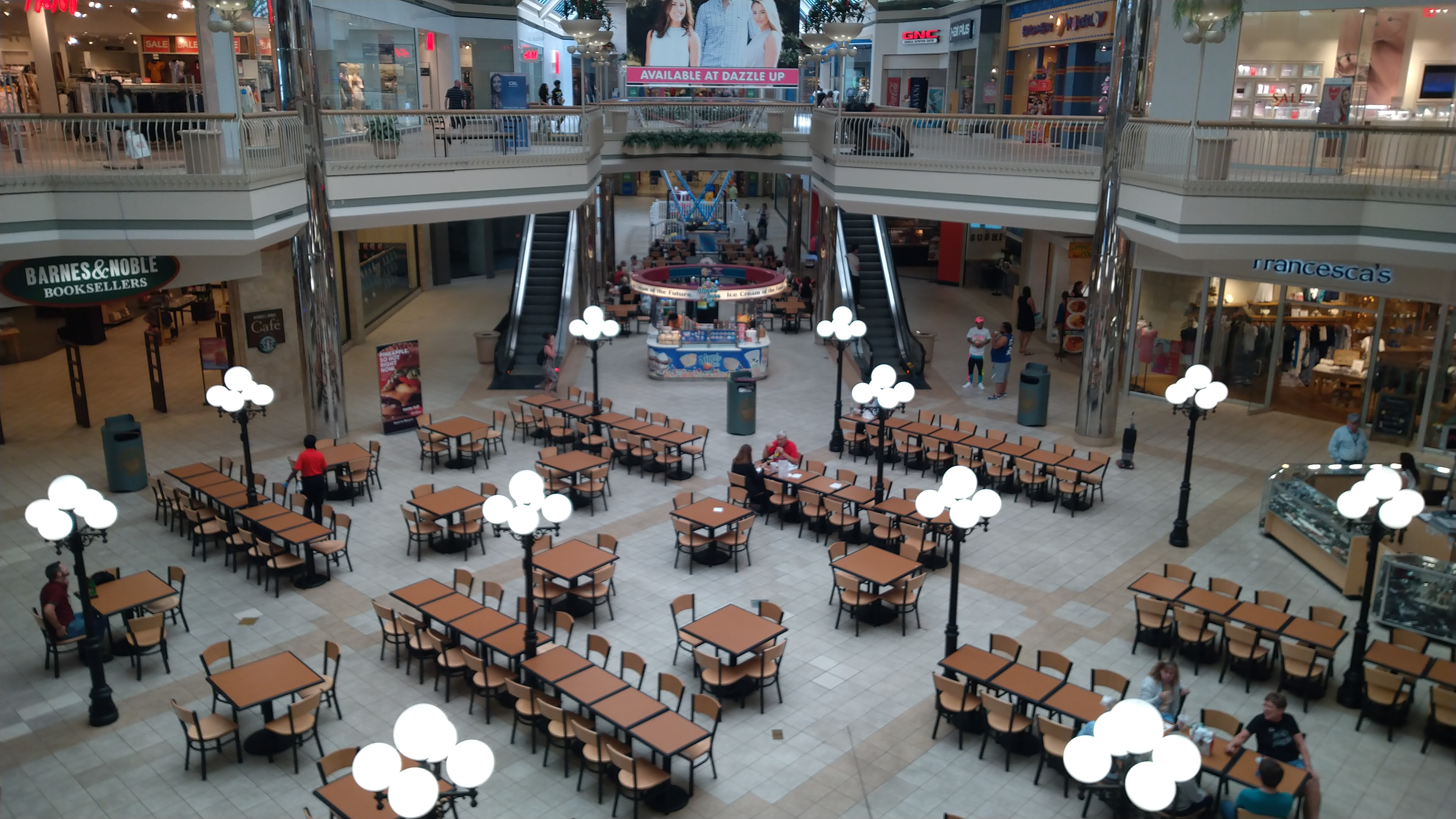
- Interior of Valley View Mall
- Location: Roanoke, Virginia, United States
- Coordinates: 37°18′14.5″N 79°57′50.1″W
- Address: 4802 Valley View Boulevard NW
- Opened: July 17, 1985
- Developer: Henry Faison
- Owner: CBL & Associates Properties
- Num. of stores: 102
- Num. of anchor tenants: 5 (3 open, 2 vacant)
- Floor area: 844,193 sq ft (78,428.1 m^{2})
- Floors: 2
- Website: www.valleyviewmall.com

Valley View Mall is an 800,000-square-foot (74,000 m^{2}) regional shopping mall located in the Roundhill neighborhood of Roanoke, Virginia. It is located near the interchange of I-581/US 220 with Hershberger Road (Route 101) in the northwest section of the city.

Most outparcel locations around Valley View Mall have been developed into restaurants, retail stores, offices, and hotels. Major surrounding stores include Ashley Furniture, Dick's Sporting Goods, Best Buy, Grand Home Furnishings, Walmart, and Target. Regal Cinemas has a 16 screen movie theater with stadium seating at an outparcel location, which replaced a smaller six screen cinema inside the mall.

== History ==
Belk court in 2006

The land that became Valley View Mall was a farm owned by the Huff family until the early 1980s. The sizable farm was unusual in that it was located within the city limits of Roanoke and directly beside Interstate 581. During a flight into Roanoke–Blacksburg Regional Airport (then called Woodrum Field) in 1976, Charlotte, North Carolina–based developer Henry Faison noticed the property and immediately realized its prime location beside I-581/US 220 and a short distance from I-81. Local activists and the owners of Tanglewood Mall filed suit to prevent rezoning of the Huff Farm for construction of Valley View Mall. The Virginia Supreme Court ultimately upheld the rezoning and ground was broken on August 22, 1983.

Valley View Mall opened on July 17, 1985. Anchor tenants were Sears, JCPenney, Leggett (now Belk), Miller & Rhoads (later Montgomery Ward), and Thalhimer's (later Hecht's; now Macy's). The original Miller & Rhoads space is divided between an annex of Macy's on the upper level and Old Navy and several other shops on the lower level. Space was left available for a sixth anchor across from Belk near the Sears end of the mall. Along the mall's access and ring road were free-standing locations of Roanoke-based electronics retailer Holdren's (later Havertys, to be replaced by DSW and Michaels), home improvement warehouse Hechinger (later a Rack & Sack grocery store; now Dick's Sporting Goods), Toys "R" Us (now Ollie's Bargain Outlet), Chi-Chi's (later TGI Fridays, now closed), and Olive Garden.

Valley View did not immediately displace Tanglewood, which is located closer to more affluent neighborhoods in Roanoke City and Roanoke County. Which even though Valley View has about 40 or 50 more stores Tangewood still manages to keep its foot traffic up. Access to Valley View was often problematic with incoming traffic backing up into the northbound lanes of Interstate 581 and exiting traffic clogging the only road out of the mall. Nonetheless, more retailers such as Roanoke-based Grand Home Furnishings and Brendle's built free-standing locations adjacent to the mall. Valley View's emergence as the retail hub of much of Southwest Virginia and Southern West Virginia was complete by the mid-1990s when traffic problems were ameliorated by the construction of a new access road and a partial interchange with Interstate 581/U.S. Route 220 south of the mall. Walmart, Target, Staples, PetSmart, and Best Buy built locations along the access road.

The mall was sold in 2001 to Chattanooga, Tennessee–based CBL & Associates Properties, Inc. In recent years, Valley View Mall has attracted prominent national retailers including Eddie Bauer and Old Navy. Most outparcel locations near the mall have been developed since the mid-1990s. Starbucks built a location in 2005, which was its first cafe in the Roanoke Valley. Hecht's was officially renamed Macy's on September 9, 2006.

A lifestyle center is being built in stages on a portion of what was the parking lot near the JCPenney and Sears entrances to the mall, with most of the freestanding dining locations now complete. The development is called "The District at Valley View", and features Barnes & Noble, various fashion retailers, and restaurants including Carrabba's Italian Grill, Abuelo's Mexican Food Embassy, and Panera Bread. H&M opened its first western Virginia store in the mall on August 28, 2014 diagonal to the right from Sears. Gap closed its store at mall on January 26, 2015; it was one of the mall's major stores.

On August 6, 2019, it was announced that Sears would be closing as part of a plan to close 26 stores nationwide. The store closed in October 2019.

A well-known landmark in Valley View Mall was the "Shoe Tie Guy" statue, of an older man in a sweater with his leg raised onto the surface of a park bench tying his shoe. It was removed on October 26, 2020 due to "loose bolts"; it is unclear if the statue's removal is temporary or permanent.

== Youth Escort Policy ==
Valley View Mall began a Youth Escort Policy in July 2007. All persons under 18 visiting the mall after 6:00 p.m. on Friday, Saturday, and Sunday, must either be accompanied by an adult or leave the premises. Unescorted teens may shop in the anchor stores but may not enter the mall area. Management implemented the policy in response to mall patrons who complained of unsupervised teenagers roaming around the mall and loitering in surrounding parking lots during weekend nights. Management had previously added extra security to address these concerns. Some local teens, who complained of a lack of entertainment alternatives in Roanoke, protested the decision as group penalization for the actions of a minority, and planned a boycott of the mall.
