= Villa Heights (house) =

Historic house in Roanoke, Virginia, US

- U.S. National Register of Historic Places
- Virginia Landmarks Register
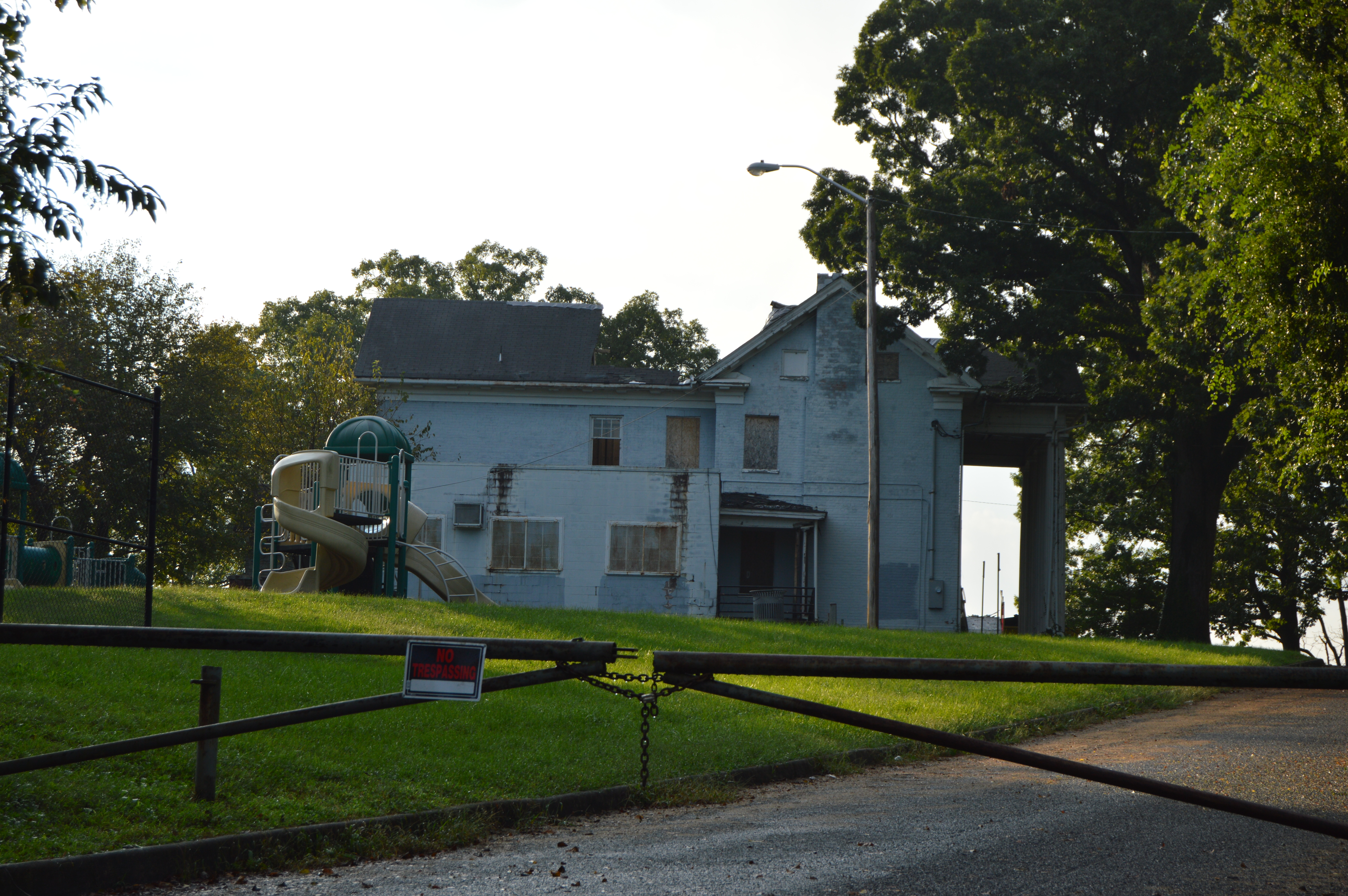
- Villa Heights in 2018

- Location within Virginia Location within the United States
- Location: 2750 Hoover Street, Roanoke, Virginia
- Coordinates: 37°17′33″N 79°58′44″W
- Area: 3.4 acres (1.4 ha)
- Built: by 1820
- Architect: Unknown
- Architectural style: Federal, Classical revival
- NRHP reference No.: 100002532
- VLR No.: 128-0012

Significant dates
- Added to NRHP: June 4, 2018
- Designated VLR: March 15, 2018

The Villa Heights house, also known as the Compton–Bateman House, is a historic house in Roanoke, Virginia, USA. Built in 1820, it was originally the home of Elijah McClanahan, a lieutenant-colonel in the War of 1812. It has been substantially renovated and restored over the years, including after a 2011 fire, and it is the namesake of the neighborhood of Villa Heights, Roanoke, Virginia. It was added to the National Register of Historic Places in 2018, and as of 2023 houses assorted non-profit groups.

== History ==
Elijah McClanahan, Roanoke County's first high sheriff and a lieutenant colonel in the War of 1812, owned much of what became Northwest Roanoke City. A portion of that land was what he called "Long Meadow", an 814-acre (329 ha) estate upon which, by 1820, he built the two-story, single-pile house in the Federal style that came to be known as Villa Heights.

The house underwent multiple changes in ownership at the end of the 19th century. By 1910 it was owned by Sallie Compton, who in that year spent $1,000 to add a rear ell to the structure. This addition put a kitchen and bathroom under the same roof as the original building and added bedrooms to the second floor.

In 1923, the house was sold again to Ernest Bateman, who initiated a significant remodel. A two-story portico with Doric columns was added to the front, and more columns and other Classical revival elements were placed in the building's interior.

The Batemans owned Villa Heights until 1958, when it was purchased by the City of Roanoke and began use as a recreation center. The city divided the estate and turned the 3.4 acres (1.4 ha) immediately surrounding the house into a park. It also built some additions to the property, including a cinderblock recreation area, an ADA-compliant bathroom in the rear, and two exterior restrooms. A playground and basketball court date to this time as well. The house was also used as a satellite office for Roanoke City Police.

The City of Roanoke ceased operations in the building in 2007, and the property was vacant in 2011 when a fire broke out and caused severe damage to the roof. There was little left of the roofing frame to attach tarpaulins or other protective fabrics onto the house, and the interior was left open to the elements for years. The city, which had been attempting to sell the house, was reluctant to pay what was anticipated to be thousands of dollars more than its insurance coverage to properly rehabilitate the property. The home was added to the Virginia endangered landmarks list in 2013.

In 2017, the city agreed to sell the property to a local non-profit organization for $1, with the stipulation that at least $868,000 (including $264,000 in insurance funds received by the city after the fire) be spent on renovations. The property was listed on the National Register of Historic Places in 2018, and the building's sale was expedited after a tax reform bill was advanced that would have ended federal tax breaks for historic renovations; the final version of the bill kept the incentives but required them to be dispensed over a five-year period rather than after one year. The building reopened in 2019, having won an award for its rehabilitation from a local preservation society, and, in 2023, housed a church and assorted non-profit organizations.
