= Washington Heights, Roanoke, Virginia =

Washington Heights
- Roanoke Neighborhood
- Interactive map of Washington Heights
- Coordinates: 37°17′55″N 79°59′57″W
- Country: United States
- State: Virginia
- City: Roanoke
- Time zone: UTC-5 (EST)
  - Summer (DST): UTC-4 (EDT)
- ZIP Codes: 24010
- Area code: 540

Washington Heights is a Roanoke, Virginia neighborhood located in northwest Roanoke, bound to the west by Virginia State Route 117. It borders the neighborhoods of Peachtree/Norwood on the west, South Washington Heights on the south, Villa Heights on the east and Westview Terrace on the north. The neighborhood sees both a mix of residential development throughout its area spanning a more traditional grid street network in addition to more typical suburban ranch style construction.
