= Elijah McClanahan =

American planter, soldier, and sheriff

Member of the Virginia House of Delegates
- In office 1808–1809

Justice of the County Court
- In office 1838, 1852 and 1856

Personal details
- Born: April 20, 1770
- Died: December 1, 1857 (aged 87)

Military service
- Rank: lieutenant colonel
- Unit: 5th/121st Virginia Militia
- Battles/wars: War of 1812

Elijah McClanahan (April 20, 1770 – December 1, 1857) (aka Elijah McClanachan; McClanechan, etc.) was a planter and soldier in western Virginia and the Roanoke Valley. He was a Lieutenant Colonel in the 5th/121st Virginia Militia in the War of 1812, and was one of the largest landholders in what later became Roanoke County, Virginia.

== Early life ==
Elijah McClanahan was the son of William and Sarah Neely McClanahan, along with three brothers: John, James and Green. He was noted as being generous, and probably had previously contracted smallpox, because at the age of 13, on October 10, 1783, he was "...allowed five pounds for attending a Continental soldier with the small pox." By the age of 22, he was granted a license to keep an ordinary (tavern) in their house.

Elijah McClanahan married on September 3, 1795, Agatha Strother Lewis (born March 15, 1779, and died June 14, 1852), granddaughter of General Andrew Lewis, who then lived on Bent Mountain, Virginia. They had twelve children.

== War of 1812 ==
On August 11, 1795, he took an oath of Captain of the Virginia militia.

With the organization of the 5th Virginia Militia, Elijah McClanahan was promoted to lieutenant colonel. He is also listed as the Lieutenant Colonel of the 121st Regiment, Virginia Militia, during the War of 1812.

== Post war ==
McClanahan was a substantial landowner in Virginia, and the owner of most of the land that ultimately became the northwest section of Roanoke City. As early as 1798, he purchased along with his partner and father-in-law, Colonel Andrew Lewis, two plots of land of 92 and 84 acres each along the Little River in Montgomery County, Virginia.

He is credited with eventually owning over 1,500 acres, and with farm holdings valued at over $75,000. By 1820, McClanahan had built Villa Heights, a two-story house in the Federal style located in what would become Northwest Roanoke City. The house was expanded and renovated multiple times, and was listed to the National Register of Historic Places in 2018.

McClanahan served as a justice when Roanoke County, Virginia was formed from part of Botetourt County, Virginia. He later was appointed the county's first high sheriff. He was also one of the trustees at the founding of the town of Salem and among the founding elders of Salem Presbyterian Church. He additionally served as one of the justices of the county court in 1838, 1852 and 1856. McClanahan was one of several men appointed to set out roads in the county, and he was prominently involved in the Allegheny Turnpike Company, an early turnpike in western Virginia that became part of the Valley Pike, and eventually U.S. Route 11 in Virginia.

== Death ==
McClanahan died on December 1, 1857.

== Bibliography ==
- Breckenbridge, James. 1783–1904. Papers. Abstract: Correspondence (chiefly relating to Breckinridge's legal career and his land speculation in western Virginia and Kentucky), legal papers, deeds, militia orders and returns, receipts, accounts, and other papers. Includes description of iron works in Wythe County, Va., Mutual Assurance Society receipts, and rates charged by ordinary keepers (1770). Topics mentioned in correspondence include Virginia and U.S. politics, local elections, War of 1812, settlement of Kentucky and Tennessee, Indian wars, slavery, and Virginia militia, with specific references to formation of Kentucky government, congressional sessions of 1793-1797 and 1805–1812, the Kentucky Resolutions (1798), troubles with squatters in Indian territory, expeditions against Indians (1791 and 1813), collection of whiskey taxes, excise taxes, the national bank, internal improvements, trial of Aaron Burr, mill owned by Breckinridge, and support of two illegitimate children. Correspondents include John Breckinridge, Robert Breckinridge, William Breckinridge, Henry Clay, Francis Walker Gilmer, Peachy R. Gilmer, George Hancock, Andrew Jackson, James Madison, John Marshall, Elijah McClanahan, James McClung, Francis Preston, John Preston, William Preston, Martha Jefferson Randolph, Archibald Stuart, and Bushrod Washington.
- National Register of Historic Places Registration Form. "Villa Heights".
- Roanoke Times. March 20, 2018. "Historic mansion in northwest Roanoke added to state landmarks register."
- White, H. M. The McClanahans. 1716. Abstract: Family history and genealogy compiled by White of the McClanahans, a Scotch-Irish family that settled in Virginia after 1716. The book describes the family's involvement in the French and Indian War and the Revolutionary War. Included is information on the Poage family.
