= Kenwood, Roanoke, Virginia =

Neighborhood in Roanoke, Virginia, U.S.

Coordinates: 37°17′8″N 79°54′12″W

Kenwood is a Roanoke, Virginia neighborhood located in southeast Roanoke, along the north bank of the Roanoke River.

It borders the neighborhoods of Morningside on the west, Fallon on the north, Riverdale on the south and the Town of Vinton on the east. The neighborhood is predominantly residential in character with the bulk of commercial development built along its Virginia State Route 24 (Dale Avenue) frontage. Its development patterns typical of those experienced for an American city during the early 20th century.
