= Virginia State Route 117 =

State highway in Virginia, US known as Peters Creek Rd

State Route 117
- Peters Creek Road

Route information
- Maintained by VDOT
- Length: 7.21 mi (11.60 km)
- Existed: July 1, 1933–present

Major junctions
- South end: US 11 in Roanoke
- US 460 in Roanoke; Future I-73 / I-581 / US 220 in Roanoke
- North end: US 11 in Hollins

Location
- Country: United States
- State: Virginia
- Counties: City of Roanoke, Roanoke

Highway system
- Virginia Routes; Interstate; US; Primary; Secondary; Byways; History; HOT lanes
← SR 116	→ SR 118

State Route 117 (SR 117) is a state highway in the U.S. state of Virginia. Known as Peters Creek Road, the state highway runs 7.21 miles (11.60 km) from U.S. Route 11 (US 11) in Roanoke north to US 11 in Hollins. SR 117 provides a four-lane divided highway bypass of Downtown Roanoke, connecting US 11 and US 460 on the southwest and northwest sides of Roanoke and Hollins in northeastern Roanoke County.

== Route description ==
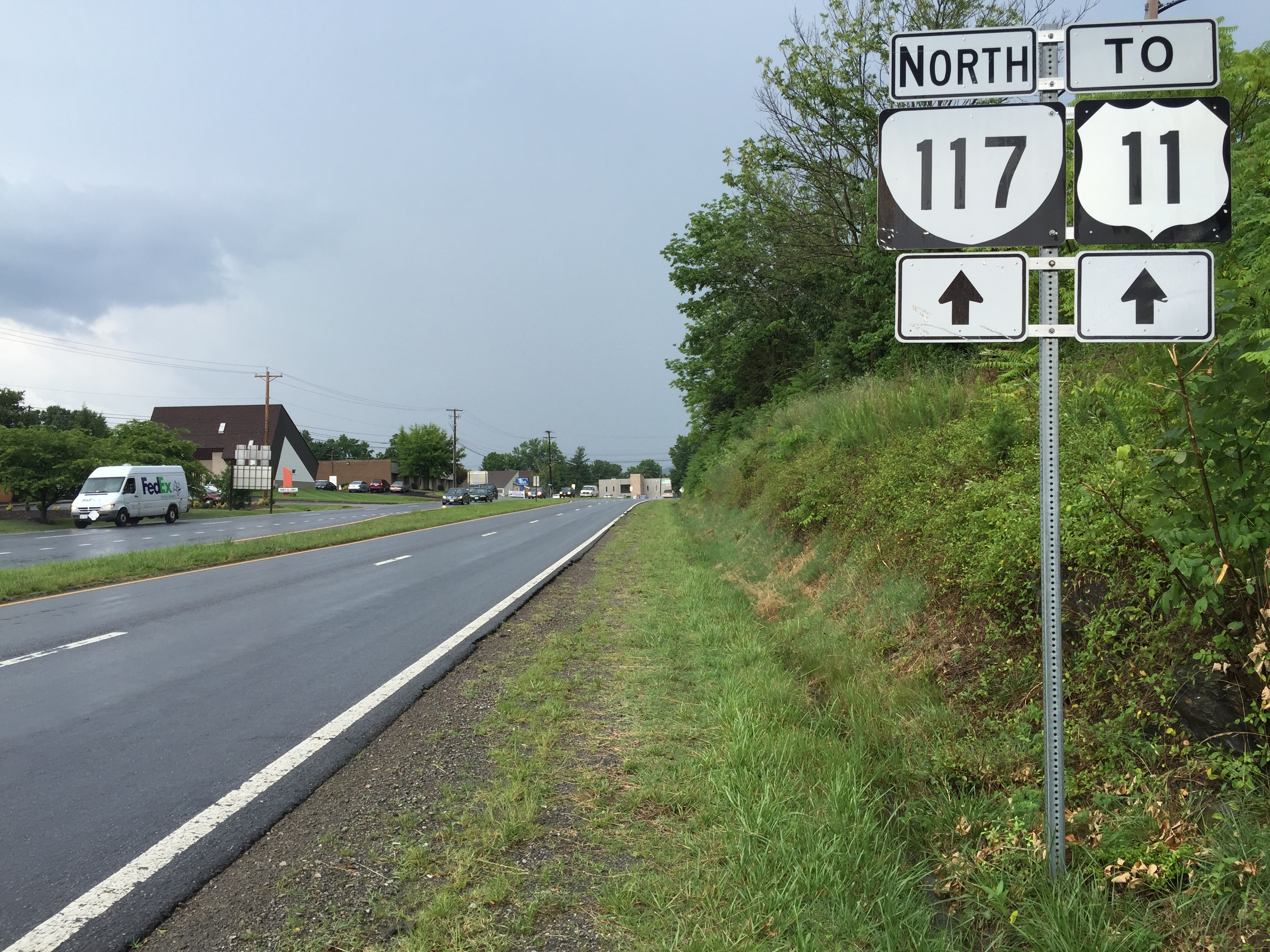
View north along SR 117 at SR 118 in Hollins

SR 117 begins at an intersection with US 11 (Brandon Avenue) west of Downtown Roanoke. The state highway heads north as a five-lane road with a center left-turn lane that crosses Norfolk Southern Railway's Whitethorne District. North of the rail crossing, SR 117 becomes a divided highway with controlled access. The state highway passes through an industrial park and crosses over the Roanoke River and the western end of the rail yard on Norfolk Southern's Christiansburg District. North of the rail yard, SR 117 intersects Shenandoah Avenue to the east of the Salem Veterans Affairs Medical Center. The state highway begins to parallel Peters Creek to the west of the Wilmont neighborhood and intersects Salem Turnpike before reaching its junction with US 460 and US 11 Alternate (Melrose Avenue).

SR 117 continues north along Peters Creek as the highway passes to the west of the Washington Heights and Westview Terrace neighborhoods and meets the western end of SR 101 (Hershberger Road). At its intersection with Cove Road, the boundary between the city of Roanoke and Roanoke County begins to follow the western margin of the road, which curves to the northeast away from Peters Creek and has a cloverleaf interchange with Interstate 581 and US 220. SR 117 passes along the northern edge of Roanoke Regional Airport and enters Roanoke County at its intersection with SR 628 (Wood Haven Road). A short distance east of the city limit, the state highway meets the northern end of SR 118 (Airport Road), which provides access to the airport from the north. SR 117 reaches its northern terminus at US 11 (Williamson Road) in Hollins.

=== History ===
Prior to 1998, the road cut off at Melrose Avenue. Prior to 1947, the road continued eastbound on Melrose Avenue/East Main Street into Salem, ending at about Roanoke College; however, it is unclear if the road ended at College Avenue (U.S. Route 11) or Craig Street (then Virginia State Route 311). It had a "Y" alignment at this time, Texas Street and Lynchburg Turnpike, that are now part of U.S. 460 Alternate.

== Major intersections ==
County	Location	mi	km	Destinations	Notes
City of Roanoke		0.00	0.00	US 11 (Brandon Avenue)	Southern terminus
City of Roanoke		2.34	3.77	US 11 Alt. / US 460 (Melrose Avenue)	
City of Roanoke		2.80	4.51	SR 101 east (Hershberger Road Northwest)	
City of Roanoke				Cove Road	former SR 116
City of Roanoke		5.04	8.11	Future I-73 / I-581 / US 220 to I-81 – Lexington, Bristol, Roanoke	Exits 2N-S on I-581
Roanoke	Hollins			SR 118 south (Airport Road) – Roanoke Regional Airport, Roanoke	Northern terminus of SR 118
Roanoke	Hollins	7.21	11.60	US 11 (Williamson Road) to US 220 – Clifton Forge, Staunton, Roanoke	Northern terminus
1.000 mi = 1.609 km; 1.000 km = 0.621 mi

< SR 207	District 2 State Routes; 1928–1933	SR 209 >
