= Wilmont, Roanoke, Virginia =

Human settlement in Roanoke, Virginia, United States of America

Coordinates: 37°17′4″N 80°0′2″W

Wilmont
- Interactive map of Wilmont
- City and Neighborhoods of Roanoke: Roanoke, Virginia

Wilmont is a Roanoke, Virginia neighborhood located in far western Roanoke. It borders the neighborhoods of South Washington Heights on the north, Cherry Hill on the south, Shenandoah West on the east and Ridgewood Park on the west.

== History ==
Annexed by the city from Roanoke County in 1949, Wilmont is primarily residential in nature, this area features both traditional and suburban characteristics as its development occurred between 1920 and 1960. Today, Wilmont is the location of Strauss Park and Fairview Elementary School.
