= Brookneal/Campbell County Airport =

- IATA: none; ICAO: none; FAA LID: 0V4

Summary
- Operator: Brookneal - Campbell County Airport Authority
- Location: Brookneal, Virginia
- Elevation AMSL: 596 ft / 182 m
- Coordinates: 37°08′27.20″N 79°01′02.00″W
- Interactive map of Brookneal/Campbell County Airport

Runways
Direction	Length		Surface
Direction	ft	m	Surface
6/24	3,798	1,158	Asphalt

The Brookneal/Campbell County Airport (FAA 0V4) is a public airport located 6 miles (9.7 km) northwest of Brookneal, in Campbell County, Virginia, USA. Established in 1978 as a joint effort between Campbell County and the Town of Brookneal, the facility serves primarily general aviation.
