= Westview Terrace, Roanoke, Virginia =

Coordinates: 37°18′25″N 79°59′48″W

Westview Terrace is a Roanoke, Virginia neighborhood located in northwest Roanoke. It borders the neighborhoods of Peachtree/Norwood on the west, Villa Heights and Washington Heights on the south and Miller Court/Arrowood on the north and east. The neighborhood is predominantly residential in character throughout its area with limited commercial development along its Virginia State Route 117 (Peters Creek Road) frontage. Its development patterns typical of those experienced for an American city during the mid-20th century with low-density housing.
