= List of Interstate Highways in Virginia =

Interstate Highways of Virginia
- Interstate markers for Interstate 81, and Interstate 295

- All Interstate Highways in Virginia. Mainline Interstates are colored blue, while auxiliary Interstates are colored red.

System information
- Length: 1,118 mi (1,799 km)

Highway names
- Interstates: Interstate X (I-X)
- US Highways: U.S. Route X (US X)
- State: State Route X (SR X) or Virginia Route X (VA X)

System links
- Virginia Routes; Interstate; US; Primary; Secondary; Byways; History; HOT lanes

The Interstate Highways in Virginia are a total of 1,118 miles (1,799 km) of Interstate Highways in the U.S. state of Virginia. Virginia consists of six primary interstate highways, and 10 auxiliary interstates. In addition, 1 more primary and one auxiliary route are planned or under construction.

== Primary highways ==
| Number | Length (mi) | Length (km) | Southern or western terminus | Northern or eastern terminus | Formed | Removed | Notes |
|---|---|---|---|---|---|---|---|
| I-64 | 300.62 | 483.80 | I-64 at the WV state line | I-664/I-264 in Chesapeake, VA | 1959 | current | |
| I-66 | 74.8 | 120.4 | I-81 in Middletown, VA | I-66 in Washington, DC | 1961 | current | |
| I-73 | — | — | I-73 at the NC state line | I-73 at the WV state line | — | 2024 | Part of it was to replace I-581 |
| I-74 | 66.27 | 106.65 | I-74/I-77 at the NC state line | I-74/I-77 at the WV state line | proposed | — | Planned to overlap Interstate 77 in the state |
| I-77 | 66.27 | 106.65 | I-74/I-77 at the NC state line | I-77 at the WV state line | 1972 | current | Was going to overlap Interstate 74 in the state |
| I-81 | 324.92 | 522.91 | I-81 at the TN state line | I-81 at the WV state line | 1959 | current | I-81 is the longest Interstate Highway in Virginia |
| I-85 | 68.64 | 110.47 | I-85 at the NC state line | I-95 in Petersburg, VA | 1958 | current | |
| I-87 | 17 | 27 | I-87 at the NC state line | Norfolk, VA | proposed | — | |
| I-95 | 178.73 | 287.64 | I-95 at the NC state line | I-95/I-495 at the Washington, DC district line | 1958 | current | |
Proposed and unbuilt

== Auxiliary highways ==
| Number | Length (mi) | Length (km) | Southern or western terminus | Northern or eastern terminus | Formed | Removed | Notes |
|---|---|---|---|---|---|---|---|
| I-195 | 3.24 | 5.21 | Virginia State Route 195 in Richmond, VA | I-64/I-95 in Richmond, VA | 1975 | current | |
| I-264 | 25.07 | 40.35 | I-64/I-664 in Chesapeake, VA | Parks Avenue, 21st Street, 22nd Street in Virginia Beach, VA | 1964 | current | |
| I-295 | 52.56 | 84.59 | I-95 near Petersburg, VA | I-64 near Short Pump, VA | 1985 | current | |
| I-381 | 2.91 | 4.68 | VA-381 in Bristol, VA | I-81/U.S. 58 in Bristol, VA | 1961 | current | |
| I-395 | 9.91 | 15.95 | I-95/I-495 in Springfield, VA | I-395 at the Washington, DC district line | 1975 | current | |
| I-464 | 5.67 | 9.12 | I-64 in Chesapeake, VA | I-264 in Norfolk, VA | 1960 | current | |
| I-495 | 21.50 | 34.60 | I-495 at the MD state line | I-95/I-495 at the Washington, DC district line | 1961 | current | |
| I-564 | 3.03 | 4.88 | SR-337 in Norfolk, VA | I-64 in Norfolk, VA | 1971 | current | |
| I-581 | 6.35 | 10.22 | US-220 in Roanoke, VA | I-81 near Hollins, VA | 1964 | current | |
| I-664 | 20.79 | 33.46 | I-64/I-264 in Chesapeake, VA | I-64 in Hampton, VA | 1981 | current | |
| I-785 | — | — | I-785 at the NC state line | U.S. 58 in Danville, VA | proposed | — | Will overlap U.S. Route 29 |
Proposed and unbuilt
