= Roanoke–Blacksburg Regional Airport =

Airport in Virginia, US

Roanoke–Blacksburg Regional Airport Woodrum Field

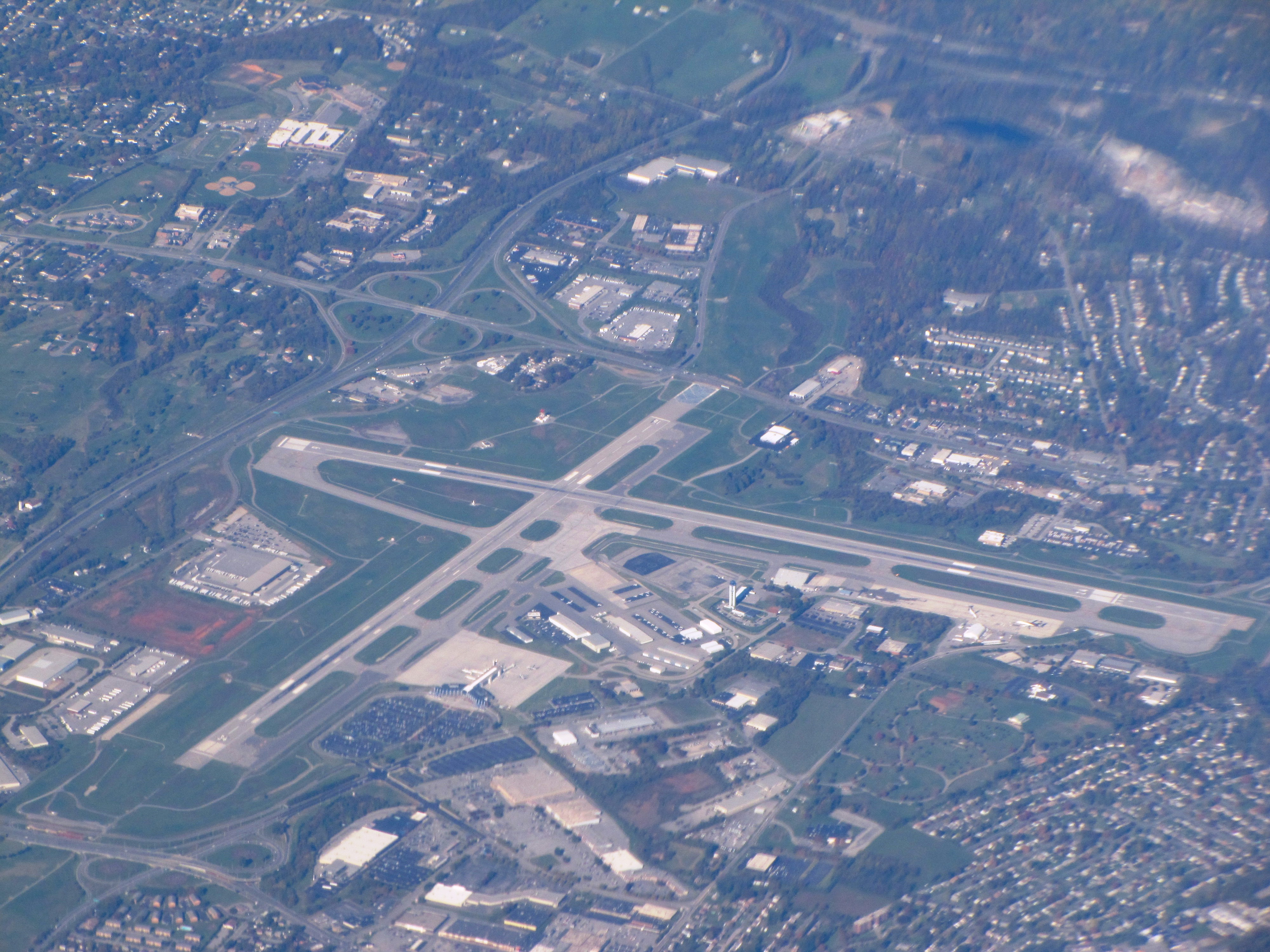
- Aerial view of Roanoke–Blacksburg Airport
- IATA: ROA; ICAO: KROA; FAA LID: ROA

Summary
- Airport type: Public
- Owner/Operator: Roanoke Regional Airport Commission
- Serves: Roanoke Valley, New River Valley
- Location: Roanoke, Virginia, United States
- Elevation AMSL: 1,175 ft (358 m)
- Coordinates: 37°19′32″N 079°58′32″W
- Website: www.flyroa.com

Map
- Location within Virginia Location within the United States

Runways
Direction	Length		Surface
Direction	ft	m	Surface
6/24	6,800	2,073	Asphalt
16/34	5,810	1,771	Asphalt

Statistics (2024)
- Passenger volume: 756,000
- Cargo (lb.): 27 mil
- Aircraft operations: 55,315
- Based aircraft (2022): 101
- Source: Federal Aviation Administration, BTS

Roanoke–Blacksburg Regional Airport (IATA: ROA, ICAO: KROA, FAA LID: ROA) (Woodrum Field) is a regional airport located three miles (c. 5 km) northwest of downtown Roanoke, Virginia, United States, although still within the independent city's borders. The five-member Roanoke Regional Airport Commission governs it, which includes representatives from the city and county of Roanoke. The airport has two runways and an average of 116 operations a day; it covers 912 acres (369 ha).

Federal Aviation Administration records say the airport had 315,293 passenger boardings (enplanements) in calendar year 2008, 297,588 in 2009 and 316,478 in 2010. It is included in the Federal Aviation Administration (FAA) National Plan of Integrated Airport Systems for 2021–2025, in which it is categorized as a non-hub primary commercial service facility.

With a history to the time following World War I, Roanoke Regional Airport has evolved from a pair of dirt runways and a single hangar to a modern airport. The terminal building was completed in 1989; the control tower was completed in 2005.

In 2021, Roanoke Regional saw 478,000 passengers, with 87% on-time departures and 86% on-time arrivals.

== History ==
After World War I, the idea of opening an airport in the Roanoke Valley became a priority for local leaders. The intended purpose was to provide a landing strip, aircraft storage, and a flight school. The original location was 6 miles (9.7 km) north of Roanoke city limits in Roanoke County. The location was secured on July 1, 1929, when the city of Roanoke signed the lease on the land to operate the Roanoke Municipal Airport. The original facility had a single 83 feet (25 m) x 100 feet (30 m) hangar and a pair of dirt runways. The first airline service commenced in 1933 when Ludington Airlines made Roanoke a stop on their New York to Nashville route.

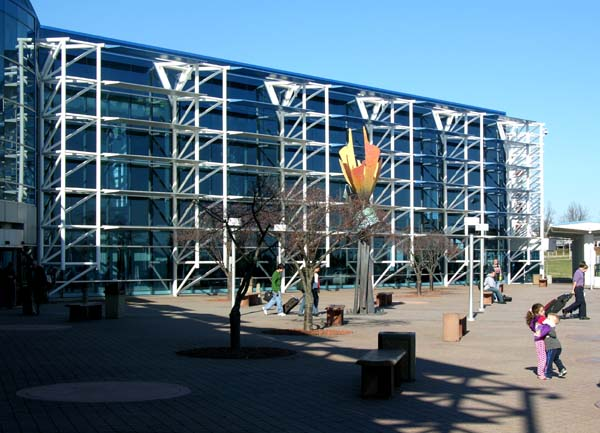
Main terminal

By 1934, American Airlines began service to Roanoke, but they moved their operations to Lynchburg in 1937 due to poor conditions in Roanoke. After American's withdrawal, city leaders determined a new facility was needed. It was initially privately operated, but the city of Roanoke took control of the facility in 1937 after it purchased the original hangar, with Works Progress Administration funds paying the costs of paving the runways. After the airport was declared a national defense project, federal funds became available to complete the facility. On December 15, 1941, it was officially dedicated. The airport was named Woodrum Field in honor of Clifton A. Woodrum, the congressional representative from Virginia's Sixth District, and after it reopened, American Airlines reestablished service to Roanoke Municipal Airport.

In 1950, Roanoke had three runways: 3730-ft runway 5, 3910-ft runway 9, and 4270-ft runway 15. By 1962, runway 5 had been extended to 5427 ft, and by 1965, runway 15 was 5800 ft; there was no further change until runway 9 was closed around 1970. In 1981, runway 5 was the longest, at 5903 ft.

The first airline jets were Piedmont 727s in 1967.

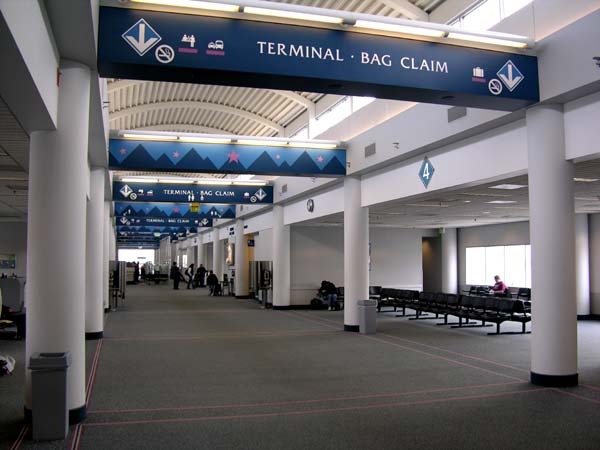
Airside in the main terminal

Shortly after it departed from Asheville Regional Airport in Asheville, North Carolina, on July 19, 1967, Piedmont Airlines Flight 22 collided with a Cessna 310 on approach to Asheville. The Piedmont Boeing 727 was en route to Roanoke. There were 82 fatalities and no survivors, making this the deadliest accident associated with Roanoke Regional Airport.

A proposal for runway expansion and facilities upgrades was developed in 1975 but was put on hold while a new regional airport was being studied. During this time, airline deregulation was put in place, and this, combined with the airport's aging facilities and airlines' phasing out of turbo prop aircraft, resulted in less service to the airport. a runway expansion began in the early 1980s to allow larger jets. With the runway extension underway, the airport changed its name from Roanoke Municipal Airport to Roanoke Regional Airport in 1983. The runway expansion was completed in 1985.

In 1984-85, the city developed a Master Plan calling for $43.8 million to be spent on a new terminal building and other improvements. $15.4 million was secured in state and local authorities covered local funding, and the remainder. The creation of a Regional Airport Commission to oversee airport operations was proposed to cover this funding. Approved by the Virginia General Assembly on February 18, 1986, and initiated on July 1, 1987, the Roanoke Regional Airport Commission has five members, three appointed from Roanoke City and two from Roanoke County. The commission ended the city of Roanoke's role as the sole operator of the airport, as it had been from 1934 through 1987.

Roanoke has never had international passenger service, but in 2001 the Airport Commission was prepared to change the airport's name to Roanoke International Airport. This was the case as the U.S. Customs Service increased the radius covered by the inland port in Dublin to include Roanoke. This expansion allowed the airport to add customs officials to accommodate international travel and cargo passing through Roanoke. The renaming did not occur as a result of the economic downturn in the wake of the September 11, 2001 attacks, however. In 2007, the prospect of changing the airport's name was again proposed by the Airport Commission.

Residents and businesses have been known to take issue with the airport's limited non-stop flights and lack of low-price fares. Airport officials estimate that around a third of airline tickets purchased by area residents are for travel from other airports. Competition includes Piedmont Triad International Airport near Greensboro, North Carolina, and others farther away that have service from Southwest Airlines or international flights. Aviation industry consultant Michael Boyd compared Roanoke's level of air service favorably to similarly sized cities.

The airport added non-stop service to Orlando in May 2006 and Tampa in December 2006 with Allegiant Air. This was part of an effort to bring new and improved service to the airport with existing and new carriers. Earlier attempts to lobby AirTran Airways and the now defunct Independence Air to serve the airport were unsuccessful.

=== Airlines ===
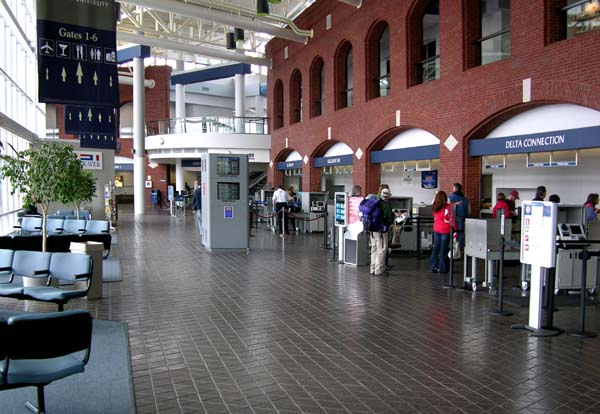
Ticketing counters on the lower level of the main terminal

Airline service to Roanoke commenced in 1933. American Airlines left Roanoke in 1962, Eastern Airlines flew to Roanoke until 1978, but the original Piedmont Airlines was the most important.

Piedmont service began on April 16, 1948, with two flights carrying 42 passengers. In the 1970s, Piedmont established a hub in Roanoke with 45 daily flights that served 330,000 passengers by 1973. In 1982, Piedmont accounted for 89 percent of all passengers that traveled through Roanoke.

From Roanoke, Piedmont flew non-stop to many airports, including: Atlanta, Charlotte, Chicago–O'Hare, Greensboro, Louisville, Nashville, Newark, Pittsburgh, Richmond, and Washington–Reagan. Piedmont continued to serve Roanoke through its merger with USAir, and the final Piedmont flights from Roanoke were on August 4, 1989.

During Piedmont's dominance, several regional airlines began and ended service to Roanoke. Between October 29, 1978, and February 1979, Allegheny Airlines flew nonstop to Pittsburgh, Aeromech Airlines briefly provided service to West Virginia destinations in the early 1980s, and Air Virginia provided service from the 1970s to the mid-1980s.

Since the Piedmont-USAir merger, Roanoke has seen various carriers. American Eagle ended service to its Raleigh-Durham hub in December 1994. In January 1996 Continental Express flew to its Newark hub; it pulled out on November 1, 1997. Other carriers at Roanoke had decreased the number of destinations served from Roanoke since the early 1990s. US Airways Express had eliminated non-stop service to Baltimore, Charlottesville, Dayton, Pittsburgh and Washington-Reagan since 1990, Northwest Airlink eliminated service to Newark in December 1992, and Delta eliminated service to Cincinnati on Chautauqua Airlines in September 2008. In 2010, Delta and Northwest Airlink merged, decreasing operations at ROA.

== Facilities ==
=== Terminal ===
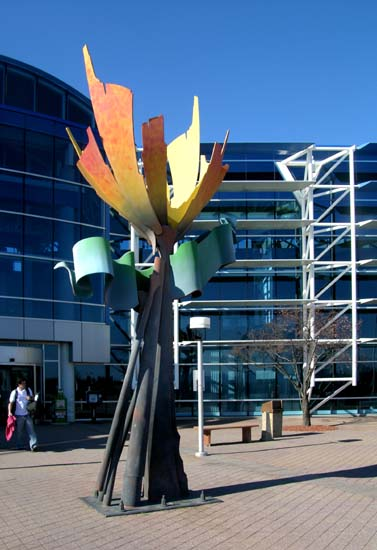
Aurora statue outside the main terminal

The terminal was designed by the Charlotte-based architectural firm Odell Associates and was built to replace the 1953 terminal, which was demolished in 2005. Construction of the terminal commenced in 1987, and it opened in October 1989 at a final cost of $25 million. The Y-shaped building features a front of blue-tinted, reflecting glass with exposed white triangular tube steel trusses. The lobby interior includes an arched brick wall leading into a central plaza and a front courtyard at the main entrance. The terminal was constructed to handle passengers expected through the year 2010, with a design that allows for expansion when warranted. Outside the terminal is an abstract, steel sculpture by New York artist Albert Paley entitled Aurora. Installed in October 1990, the sculpture is 21 feet (6.4 m) feet tall.

Landside facilities, or the facilities outside the TSA security checkpoint, include check-in, car rental, baggage claim and a taxi hire. The upper level has a small cafe and newsstand. The upper-level Airside, or the facilities located inside the TSA security checkpoint, has seven gates (Gates 1–6 and 5A) and a small cafe area. The entire terminal has been a free Wi-Fi hotspot since April 2, 2003.

The terminal was designed to allow expansion, and there has been talk of an expansion shortly, though plans have yet to be announced. With gate space being used to capacity at peak times, there is little capacity for new flights unless they operate at off-peak times.

=== Runways ===
Roanoke Regional Airport has a pair of runways; The longer is 6,800 feet (2,100 m) x 150 feet (46 m), and the other is 5,810 feet (1,770 m) x 150 feet (46 m).

An expansion to Runway 6/24 was envisioned in the 1970s. Expansion was delayed until the early 1980s while a proposed new regional airport serving Roanoke, Lynchburg and Martinsville, to be built in Bedford County, was evaluated. When this proposal was scrapped, the runway expansion was completed in 1985 and 900 feet (270 m) was added to its east end.

The expansion included a tunnel beneath Runway 06/24 on Virginia State Route 118. Completed between 1983 and 1985, the Roanoke Regional Airport Commission maintains it. The most recent runway refurbishment was completed in 2002, in addition to the relocating one of the taxiways to prevent runway incursions.

Due to the size and layout of its runways, the airport has been rated among the top ten airports within usable distance of Andrews Air Force Base for training pilots in the 89th Operations Group. This group is responsible for piloting Air Force One as the Special Air Mission fleet for the President of the United States.

=== Control tower ===
Roanoke Regional Airport has been served by five control towers. The first tower was commissioned in March 1943, and the fourth commissioned on June 6, 1952, located atop the original terminal building. With the opening of the new terminal in 1989, a replacement tower became necessary to allow for the demolition of the original terminal building. The new tower would also provide controllers unobstructed view of the entire airport, as the original structure did not.

Federal funding for a new tower fell through in 1993 and again in 1997. In 1999, however, the FAA announced that they were restarting the Roanoke project, paving the way for its construction. The present tower is 197 feet (60 m) in height and has been operational since its commission by the FAA on December 5, 2004. It was officially dedicated on May 16, 2005, in honor of former Roanoke air traffic manager John Hinkle.

Twenty-nine air traffic controllers work the Roanoke air traffic control facility, which in addition to the tower includes a TRACON (Terminal Radar Approach Control) that also provides air traffic services for Lynchburg, Smith Mountain Lake, New London, Brookneal and the Falwell Airport in Lynchburg. The TRACON also provides non radar services to Dublin, Blacksburg, and Hillsville, due to radar limitations caused by surrounding terrain. The total airspace controlled by Roanoke stretches well over 200 miles (320 km) from the Mountain Empire region to Farmville.

=== Parking and ground transportation ===
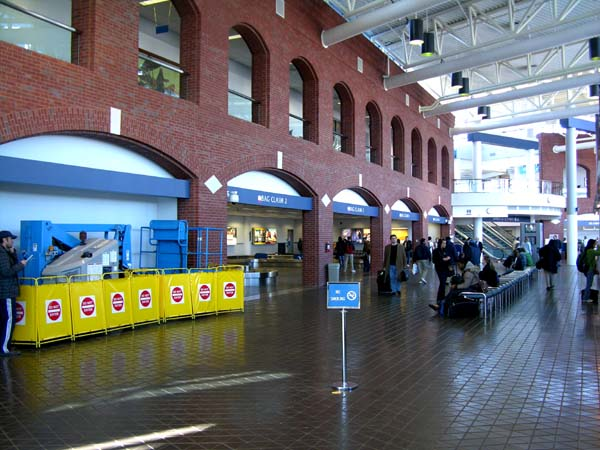
Baggage claim and rental car area

Roanoke Regional features a large surface parking lot, which is divided into long term (996 spaces) and short term (226 spaces) parking. An additional 598 parking spaces are available in an overflow lot across Aviation Drive during peak travel times. A small parking shuttle bus operates every 10 to 15 minutes between 6 a.m. and midnight, which has been in service since 1990. A multi-level parking garage is planned atop the site of the existing long term lot.

The airport is accessible via Aviation Drive, which branches off Hershberger Road just east of Exit 3E off I-581 leading to downtown Roanoke. The airport can also be reached from Virginia State Route 118 by connecting with Municipal Drive just east of the terminal.

Major rental car companies serve the airport. Taxi and limousine service is provided by local companies.

The airport is also served by the Smart Way Bus, with its stop located outside the eastern end of the terminal. Operating Monday through Saturday, the Smart Way serves both downtown Roanoke as well as Salem, Christiansburg, Blacksburg and Virginia Tech. As of fall 2019 Valley Metro has reinstated local bus service to the airport between 5:45AM and 8:45PM on route 25. The bus travels from downtown to the airport via Hollins Road and a one way trip takes about 25 minutes.

== Airlines and destinations ==
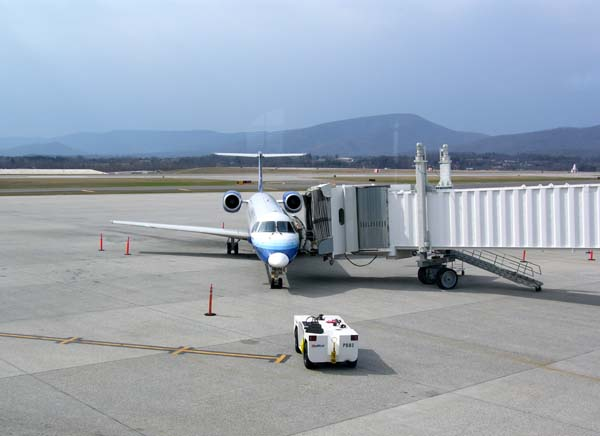
United Express Embraer ERJ-145XR at Gate 2

=== Passenger ===
Airlines	Destinations
Allegiant Air	Orlando/Sanford, St. Petersburg/Clearwater, Sarasota
American Eagle	Charlotte, Chicago–O'Hare, Dallas/Fort Worth, New York–LaGuardia, Philadelphia
Delta Air Lines	Atlanta
Delta Connection	Atlanta, New York–LaGuardia
United Express	Chicago–O'Hare, Washington–Dulles

== Statistics ==
=== Top destinations ===
Busiest domestic routes out of ROA (August 2025 – July 2026)
Rank	City	Passengers	Carriers
1	Charlotte, North Carolina	118,180	American
2	Atlanta, Georgia	102,010	Delta
3	Chicago–O'Hare, Illinois	68,860	American, United
4	Washington–Dulles, Virginia	40,270	United
5	New York–La Guardia, New York	26,870	American, Delta
6	Philadelphia, Pennsylvania	23,360	American
7	Orlando–Sanford, Florida	16,650	Allegiant
8	St. Petersburg/Clearwater, Florida	15,960	Allegiant
9	Sarasota, Florida	7,890	Allegiant
10	Dallas/Fort Worth, Texas	3,800	American

=== Carrier shares ===
Carrier shares (August 2025 – July 2026)
Carrier	Passengers (arriving and departing)
Piedmont	266,000(31.94%)
Endeavor	145,000(17.46%)
Allegiant	81,330(9.78%)
CommuteAir	78,360(9.42%)
Delta	74,150(8.91%)
Other	187,000(22.50%)

== See also ==
- List of airports in Virginia
