= Tinker Creek =

Stream in Union County, South Carolina, U.S.

Coordinates: 34°34′45″N 81°34′39″W

Tinker Creek is a stream in Union County, South Carolina, in the United States.

Tinker Creek, originally called Tinkle Creek, was named for the sound of running water, according to local history.
