= Interstate 581 =

Highway in Virginia

Interstate 581
- I-581 highlighted in red

Route information
- Auxiliary route of I-81
- Maintained by VDOT
- Length: 6.64 mi (10.69 km)
- Existed: 1964–present
- NHS: Entire route

Major junctions
- South end: US 220 / SR 24 in Roanoke
- North end: I-81 / US 220 near Hollins

Location
- Country: United States
- State: Virginia
- Counties: City of Roanoke, Roanoke

Highway system
- Interstate Highway System; Main; Auxiliary; Suffixed; Business; Future; Virginia Routes; Interstate; US; Primary; Secondary; Byways; History; HOT lanes
← I-564	→ SR 598

Interstate 581 (I-581) is a spur of I-81 into Roanoke, Virginia, completely overlapping US Route 220 (US 220). It was planned to be connected to I-73. Future I-73 Corridor signs have been marked on I-581 on the southbound side just after exit 2.

== Route description ==
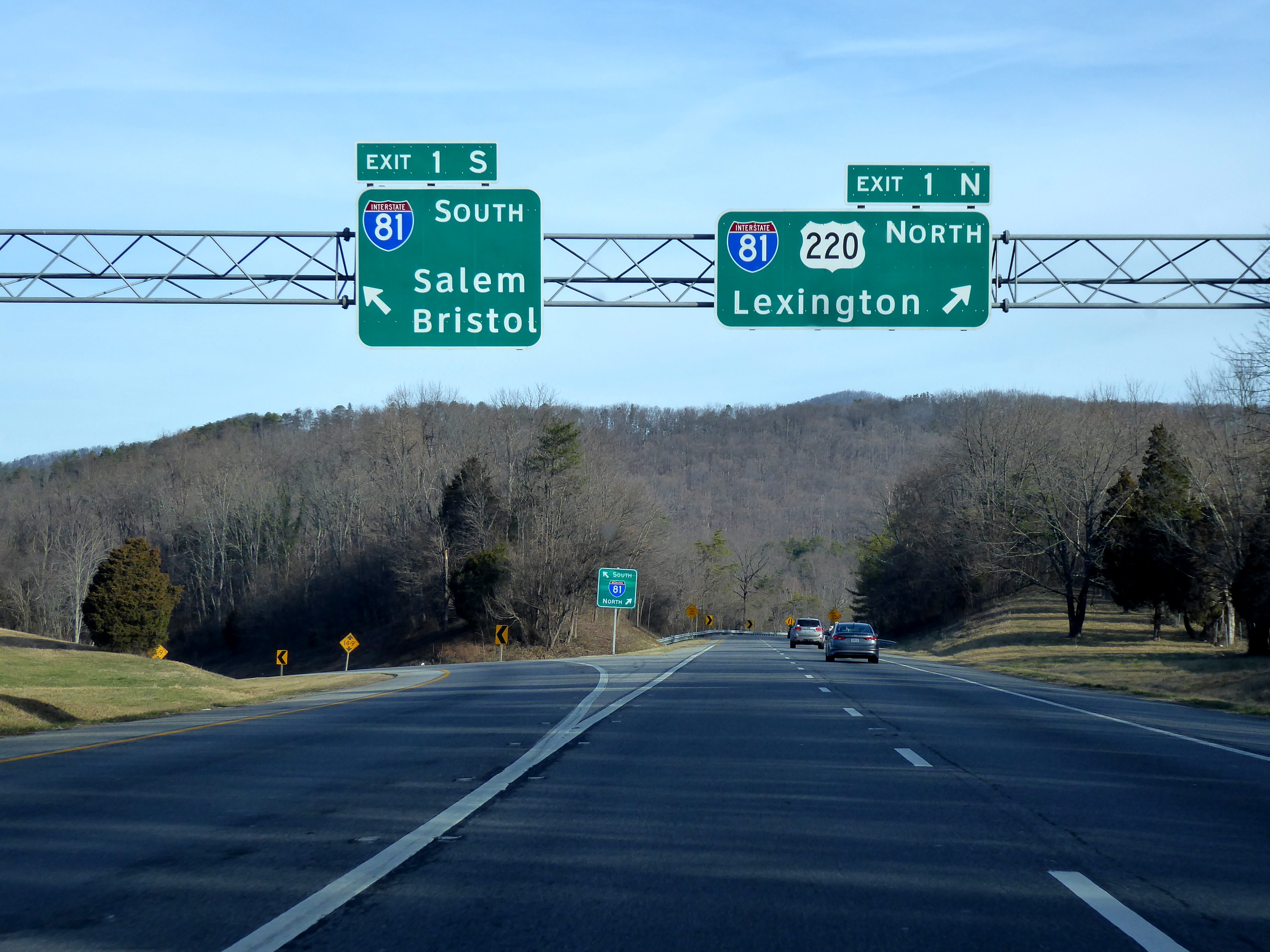
Northern terminus of I-581 at I-81 in Roanoke County

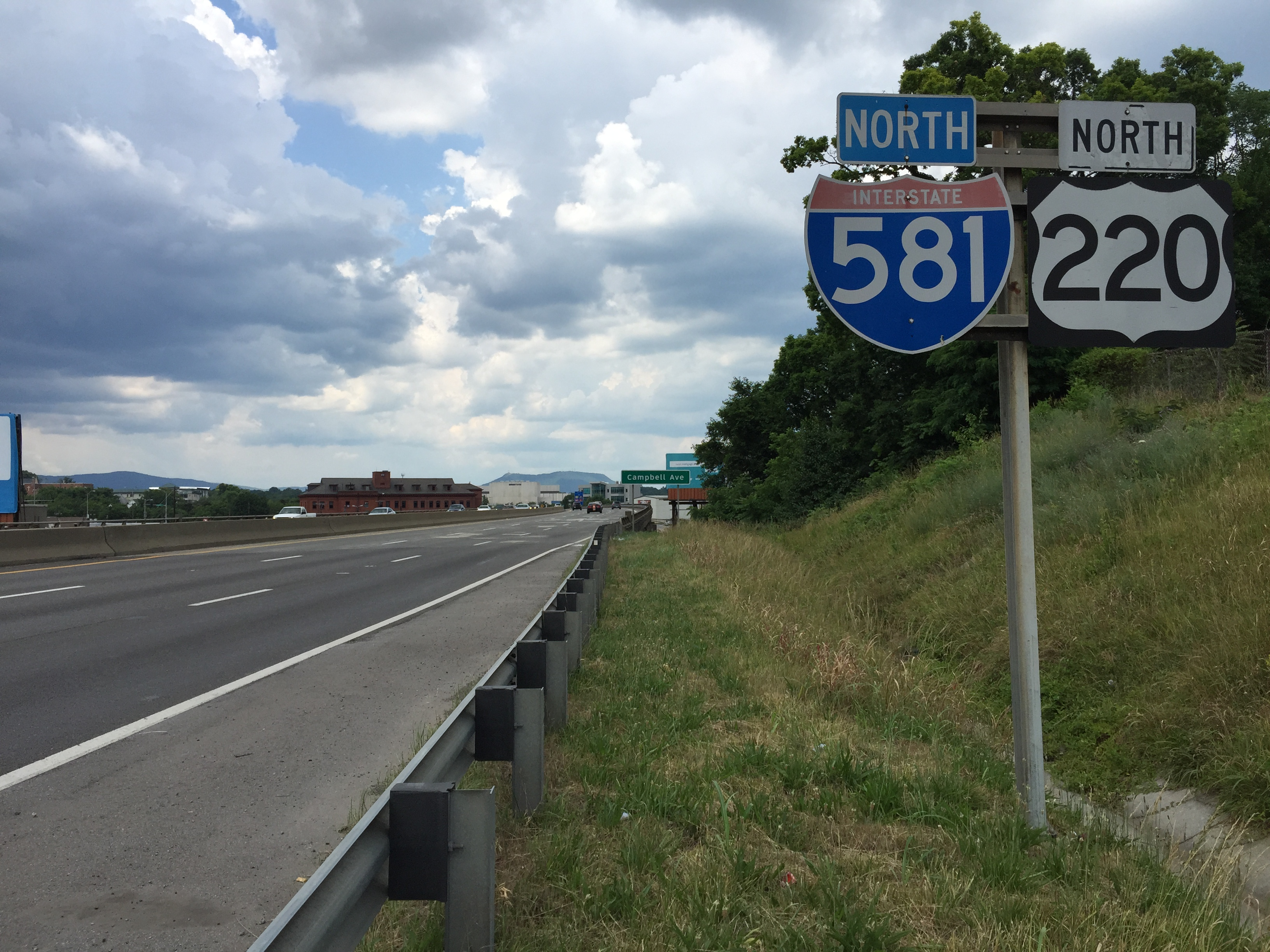
View north along I-581/US 220 just north of SR 24 in Roanoke

The I-581 designation ends at the Elm Avenue (State Route 24 (SR 24)) interchange in downtown Roanoke, where US 220 continues south as the Roy L. Webber Expressway. I-581 was constructed as a six lane highway for its entire length and has not been widened in its history.

Many of I-581's exits are cloverleaf interchanges, which results in weaving. The northern terminus has short merge areas with I-81, particularly the left-lane southbound merge.

Roanoke–Blacksburg Regional Airport, Valley View Mall, and Berglund Center are all located adjacent to I-581. The Hershberger Road (SR 101) exit has become a focus of development. In addition to Valley View, two large hotels were constructed in the early 1980s with another group of hotels being constructed from the mid-1990s through the present. In 2002, local CBS affiliate WDBJ constructed its new facility, designed to broadcast in HDTV, on Hershberger Road near I-581.

The southern end of I-581 offers views of the downtown Roanoke skyline, most prominently the Hotel Roanoke, the Wells Fargo Tower, the former Roanoke Shops of Norfolk Southern Railway, the Norfolk Southern tower, and St. Andrews Catholic Church. The Roanoke Star is also clearly visible.

== History ==
=== Roy L. Webber Expressway ===
In 1980, the highway was extended approximately 3.3 miles (5.3 km) from the Elm Avenue interchange to SR 419 near Tanglewood Mall in Roanoke County. US 220 continues as a four lane arterial road south of the SR 419 interchange. Since the extension was not constructed to full Interstate Highway standards, it only carried the US 220 designation and was named the Roy L. Webber Expressway after a former mayor of Roanoke. The primary interchange along the expressway is at Wonju Street, which links Franklin Road (US 220 Business) and Colonial Avenue and Brandon Avenue (US 11). This exit provides quick access to downtown Roanoke from residential areas in southwest Roanoke. Wonju Street is named after Wonju, South Korea, one of Roanoke's sister cities. The expressway was originally constructed with four lanes but was widened to six lanes in the mid-1990s.

=== Planned I-73 ===
The road was planned to become part of an extension of I-73 in Virginia. As of 2025, plans were shelved.

== Exit list ==
County	Location	mi	km	Exit	Destinations	Notes
City of Roanoke		0.00	0.00		US 220 south – Martinsville	Continuation south; southern end of US 220 concurrency
City of Roanoke		0.00	0.00	6	SR 24 (Elm Avenue) – Vinton	
City of Roanoke		0.66	1.06	5	US 11 / US 221 south / US 220 Bus. – Downtown	Southbound exit and northbound entrance; US 221 not signed
City of Roanoke		0.97	1.56	4	US 460 (Orange Avenue) – Berglund Center	Signed as exits 4E (east) and 4W (west)
City of Roanoke		2.65	4.26	3C	Valley View Boulevard – Airport	Diverging diamond interchange completed in November 2016 with new south bound exit and northbound entrance ramps, now providing complete access
City of Roanoke		3.76	6.05	3	SR 101 (Hershberger Road) – Airport	Signed as exits 3E (east) and 3W (west)
City of Roanoke		5.51	8.87	2	SR 117 (Peters Creek Road)	Signed as exits 2N (north) and 2S (south)
Roanoke		6.35	10.22	1	I-81 / US 220 north – Salem, Bristol, Lexington	Northern terminus; northern end of US 220 concurrency; signed as exits 1N (north) and 1S (south); exit 143 on I-81
1.000 mi = 1.609 km; 1.000 km = 0.621 mi: Concurrency terminus; Incomplete access
