= Coffee pot (disambiguation) =

Coffee pot is a cooking pot for making coffee. It may also refer to:

- Coffeepot (François-Thomas Germain)
- The Coffee Pot (Bedford, Pennsylvania)
- The Coffee Pot (Tasmania)
- The Coffee Pot (Roanoke, Virginia)
- The Coffee Pot (Winston-Salem, North Carolina)
- The "Coffee Pot" - Steam Motor Coach at the Pichi Richi Railway
- CGR 0-4-0ST 1881 Coffee Pot, South African locomotive
- Coffeepot Pass, mountain gap and footpath in Colorado

== See also ==
- Karlsbad coffee pot
- Bayreuth coffee pot
