= Gainsboro Branch Library =

Historic library in Roanoke, Virginia, US

- Gainsboro Branch of the Roanoke City Public Library
- U.S. National Register of Historic Places
- U.S. Historic district – Contributing property
- Virginia Landmarks Register
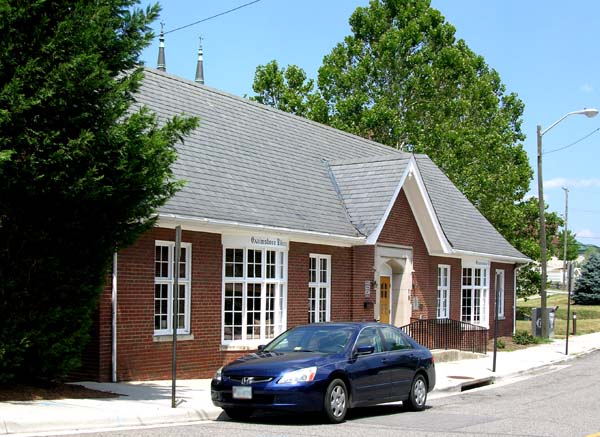
- Gainsboro Branch of the Roanoke City Public Library, June 2010

- Location within Virginia Location within the United States
- Location: 15 Patton Ave., NW, Roanoke, Virginia
- Coordinates: 37°16′38″N 79°56′28″W
- Area: 0.2 acres (0.08 ha)
- Built: 1941-1942
- Architect: Eubank & Caldwell
- Architectural style: Tudor Revival
- NRHP reference No.: 96001448
- VLR No.: 128-0256

Significant dates
- Added to NRHP: December 2, 1996
- Designated VLR: September 18, 1996

The Gainsboro Branch Library is a historic library building located in the Gainsboro neighborhood of Roanoke, Virginia, United States. It was built in 1941–1942 and is a one-story, seven-bay brick building built with an L-plan and gabled roof, and designed in the Tudor Revival style. The library's history dates to 1921 as the fourth library for African Americans in the Southern United States. It is home to a significant black history collection that was gradually amassed by longtime librarian Virginia Lee. After being told by city officials to remove the items, Lee moved them into request-only storage. The collection is now on display in a room dedicated for and named after Lee, and the library has seen recognition for its role in preserving the area's African American heritage.

The library was listed on the National Register of Historic Places in 1996, and was made part of the Gainsboro Historic District in 2005. It underwent significant renovations in 2009 and 2020.

== History ==
The history of the Gainsboro neighborhood dates to 1835, when the small community of Gainesborough received a town charter. When the Virginia and Tennessee Railroad arrived in the area in 1852, a new depot was built just south of the town, and development in that area initiated the founding of the town of Big Lick in 1874. In 1882, Big Lick was chosen as the headquarters for the Norfolk and Western Railway. A new town charter changed its name to Roanoke and annexed nearly two and a half square miles of land, including the Town of Gainesborough.

Gainsboro (as it was increasingly known) had by that point become predominantly African American; the 1880 census showed four times as many black citizens there than white. Mostly segregated from the rest of what in 1884 had become the City of Roanoke, the neighborhood developed to be largely self-sustaining, with its own business district, hospitals, and social institutions. In 1916, noted educator Lucy Addison was successful in petitioning the city for a high school for its black population, and Harrison School opened the following year. Three years later, the pastor of Roanoke's oldest Baptist church wrote to the city for help establishing a library for Gainsboro, and in 1921, Roanoke became just the fourth Southern U.S. city to open a library for African Americans.

The library opened in the basement of a newly-constructed building on Gainsboro Road that also housed a local Odd Fellows chapter. At the library's first anniversary celebration, Virginia Young, a junior at Harrison School, acted as a student representative. The following year, Young achieved valedictorian honors at the school and went on to be a part of the inaugural class of students to graduate from the Hampton Institute School of Library Science. She moved back to Roanoke in 1927, and by the next year, Young, known by then as Virginia Lee, was made head librarian at the Gainsboro Library.

Lee began a collection of books by and about African Americans early in her career. In 1928, she was warned by city library administrators to "slow the pace" of her displays of black history. The library's overall collection grew under Lee's leadership, and by the late 1930s a new building was being negotiated with the city. Roanoke City Council eventually opted to issue a $20,000 bond for the construction of a new library in Gainsboro, while one was issued for $150,000 in the same year towards a library for its white citizens. The latter branch, however, was dependent on additional funds from the Works Progress Administration (WPA), while the one intended for Gainsboro was entirely locally financed. When rules governing the disbursement of WPA funds changed with the advent of World War II, those supplementary funds were no longer available for the main library, which ultimately was not built until 1952.

Lee was aware that the $20,000 allocated for Gainsboro's new branch would not be enough for both construction of a building and the purchasing of land. Lee asked for help from St. Andrew's Catholic Church, which owned a potential site across the street from the original library. The priest there said that he did not have that authority, but assisted Lee in writing a letter to Pope Pius XII in Rome. The pope responded by donating use of the land to the library for a period of 99 years.

Ground was broken on the new library in 1941. Eubank and Caldwell, which had previously worked in the Gainsboro neighborhood on a remodel of the Burrell Memorial Hospital, was hired as the architectural firm. The building's Tudor Revival style was reportedly suggested by Lee in order to complement the nearby Hotel Roanoke. The library is a one-story, L-plan building fronted with five-course American bond brick and consisting of seven symmetrical bays and a shingled gabled roof. A prominent feature of the exterior are two bow windows on either side of a limestone door, and above each of these windows are the words "Gainsboro Library" handpainted in blackletter. The interior of the building includes many of its original features, including oak tables, chairs, and Mission-style bookcases.

The new library opened in 1942. Soon after opening, the city informed Lee that if she did not remove her black history collection from the library she could lose her job. Rather than remove it entirely, Lee moved the volumes to the building's basement and would retrieve items for patrons by request. When Lee ended her 43 years of work at the library in 1971, the black history collection she had curated totaled 3,500 items. It was dedicated as the Virginia Y. Lee Collection in 1982, and has since been displayed in its own space in the library.

During the mid-20th century, the city of Roanoke undertook a series of urban renewal projects with the aim of obtaining land for an interstate spur, a civic center, and other commercial interests. The land, obtained via eminent domain, came primarily from the Northeast and Gainsboro neighborhoods, each of which consisted of African-American citizens who had largely been redlined from the rest of the city. In the Gainsboro neighborhood, despite city officials promising revitalization, urban renewal resulted in 25 new houses erected, while hundreds more were demolished. Gainsboro Road was widened to four lanes, inhibiting pedestrian traffic to the library, which, combined with the area's depopulation, negatively affected the institution. Gainsboro residents were nonetheless successful in halting repeated efforts to close the branch, and in 1996, it was listed on the National Register of Historic Places. It was made a contributing structure to the Gainsboro Historic District in 2005.

The building was closed from March 2008 until March 2009 for a $1 million renovation, its first since opening. The structure's historic nature was retained while almost doubling its square footage, including the addition of a meeting room, a space for teenagers, and a fireplace and wooden floors for the Virginia Y. Lee room. It closed again in September 2020 for an additional renovation. After receiving another $1 million in upgrades, the branch reopened along with the other city libraries in June 2021 after closing due to the COVID-19 pandemic.

In the 2020s, the library has received recognition for its part in the city's history. In September 2023, a historical marker was unveiled on the site, acknowledging Gainsboro residents' activism in establishing the library, as well as Lee's contributions in preserving black history. Later that year, the library was awarded by the Roanoke Valley Preservation Foundation for its century-long position as the foremost keeper of Roanoke's African American history.
