= Virginia Young Lee =

American librarian (1906–1992)

- Born: Virginia Dare Young; November 22, 1906; McComas, West Virginia, U.S.
- Died: January 11, 1992 (aged 85); Roanoke, Virginia, U.S.
- Resting place: Williams Memorial Park
- Occupation: Librarian
- Spouse: Loyd Alexander Lee (divorced)
- Awards: Strong Men & Women in Virginia History honoree, 2025

Virginia Dare Young Lee (née Young; November 22, 1906 – January 11, 1992) was a librarian at the Gainsboro Branch Library in Roanoke, Virginia. Lee earned recognition for her advocacy for Black literature during the Harlem Renaissance and for mentorship of young librarians in Virginia.

== Early life and education ==
Virginia Dare Young was born on November 22, 1906, in McComas, West Virginia, to Robert D. Young and Lula B. Young. She was raised in Roanoke, Virginia and attended Lucy Addison High School where she graduated as class Valedictorian in 1924. Lee graduated from the Hampton Institute's School of Library Science (present-day Hampton University).

== Career ==
Following graduation Lee worked at LeMoyne Junior College and Gilmer School in Roanoke, Virginia.

In 1928, Lee became the fourth librarian of the Gainsboro Branch Library of Roanoke Public Libraries. The Gainsboro Branch was one of the first libraries in the South for Black citizens.

While working at the Gainsboro Branch, Lee grew the libraries' collection of Black literature. She wrote to prominent African Americans such as George Washington Carver, Marian Anderson, and Paul R. Williams, soliciting biographies, sheet music, photographs, and other materials to build the collection.

When city officials demanded Lee dispose of the collection in the mid-1940s, she moved the collection to the basement of the library and continued to collect and distribute the books in secret.

In 2023, a historic marker was dedicated to the Gainsboro Branch Library by the Virginia Department of Historic Resources.

== Personal life and legacy ==
Lee was married to Loyd Alexander Lee, a secretary, but later divorced.

Lee died on January 11, 1992, in Roanoke, Virginia and was buried at Williams Memorial Park.

In 2025, Lee was awarded the Strong Men & Women in Virginia History honoree, by the Library of Virginia and Dominion Energy.
