= Harrison School (Roanoke, Virginia) =

- U.S. National Register of Historic Places
- Virginia Landmarks Register
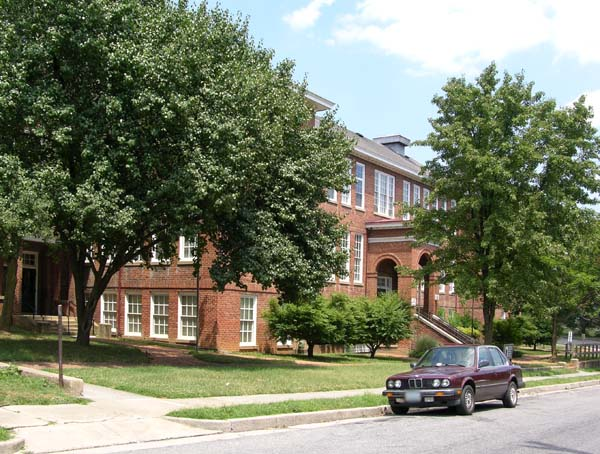
- Harrison School, June 2010

- Location within Virginia Location within the United States
- Location: 523 Harrison Ave., NW, Roanoke, Virginia
- Coordinates: 37°16′46″N 79°56′53″W
- Area: 0.8 acres (0.32 ha)
- Built: 1916
- Architect: Page, J.H.
- NRHP reference No.: 82004592
- VLR No.: 128-0043

Significant dates
- Added to NRHP: September 9, 1982
- Designated VLR: May 18, 1982

Harrison School is a historic public school building for African-American students in Roanoke, Virginia. It is a rectangular, 13-bay brick building done in modified Georgian Revival architecture. The school was built in 1916, and two-story wings were added in 1922. It was the first school in the city to educate black students beyond the seventh-grade level, and its first principal was the noted educator Lucy Addison. After closing as a school in the 1960s, the building served as a child care center and later low-income housing as well as the home of the Harrison Museum of African American Culture.

It was listed on the National Register of Historic Places in 1982.

== History ==
At the turn of the 20th century, the education of African-Americans was a low priority in many Southern states. There had been a school for young Black children in Roanoke since the 1870 establishment of a statewide public school system under the Underwood Constitution, but travel to Virginia State College in Petersburg was necessary for any Black student in the area desiring schooling beyond the seventh grade. Lucy Addison, a teacher in Roanoke's Gainsboro neighborhood since 1886, advocated for a new school aimed at older students. The city school board acquiesced in 1916, and the Harrison School opened the following year, with Addison as its first principal.

The new building was constructed for just under $32,000 (equivalent to $950,000 in 2025). It was done in a modified Georgian style, which was a popular design for school buildings of the time. It is a thirteen-bay, three-story structure faced with brick. The need for additional space warranted the addition of a pair of three-bay wings of two stories in 1922.

In its first year, the school had 14 students and only taught eighth grade. An additional semester of high school curriculum was added each year, however, and 1924 saw the graduation of the first class of students educated for a full four years at Harrison. The school earned its state accreditation the following year. Also in 1925, Addison succeeded in petitioning for a free dental clinic to be added to the school.

Addison retired from education in 1927. By that time, Harrison School's 1,300 students was the largest enrollment of any school in the city. In 1928, the city built a new high school for its Black population and named it after the former Harrison principal. A contemporary news report named it the first instance of a Roanoke public building bearing the name of one of its citizens. Following the construction of the new high school, Harrison School saw continued use as an elementary and middle school. A 1941 report by Virginia's Department of Education determined that its facilities were severely lacking, due largely to a lack of funding for repairs and maintenance. The building was also without a gymnasium, auditorium, or restroom facilities for male teachers.

Harrison School was used as an elementary school through the 1960s, but closed in 1971 following the integration of schools in Roanoke City. The building functioned as a daycare center until 1979, then sat empty until 1982. That year, in addition to being listed on the National Register of Historic Places, the US Department of Housing and Urban Development (HUD) provided funding for a local nonprofit organization to repurpose the facility as low-income housing for senior citizens. The structure's renovation included space for the new Harrison Museum of African American Culture, though Internal Revenue Service rules regarding HUD loans initially restricted the percentage of floor space the cultural center could occupy. Jim Olin, Roanoke's congressional representative, fought for and succeeded in obtaining an exception for the museum, and by its first anniversary the Harrison Museum occupied the entirety of the building's bottom floor.

In 2009, the Harrison Museum left its home in the former school building and reopened in a downtown Roanoke arts and culture center in 2013. The space it had occupied was turned into additional low-income apartments.
