= Southern Hills, Roanoke, Virginia =

Southern Hills
- Roanoke Neighborhood
- Interactive map of Southern Hills
- Coordinates: 37°13′33″N 79°57′44″W
- Country: United States
- State: Virginia
- City: Roanoke
- Time zone: UTC-5 (EST)
  - Summer (DST): UTC-4 (EDT)
- ZIP Codes: 24014
- Area code: 540

Southern Hills is a neighborhood of the independent city of Roanoke, Virginia, United States. Located geographically as the city's southernmost neighborhood, Southern Hills was annexed from Roanoke County in 1976 and has seen significant residential and commercial development since the 1990s. It borders the neighborhoods of the Franklin-Colonial and South Roanoke on the north, Garden City on the east and Roanoke County on the south and west. Its western boundary runs concurrent with U.S. 220.
