= Virginia Lee =

Virginia Lee may refer to:

- Virginia Lee (rower)
- Virginia Lee (actress)
- Virginia Man-Yee Lee, American neuropathologist
- Virginia Young Lee, American librarian
