= Old Southwest, Roanoke, Virginia =

Old Southwest
- Roanoke Neighborhood
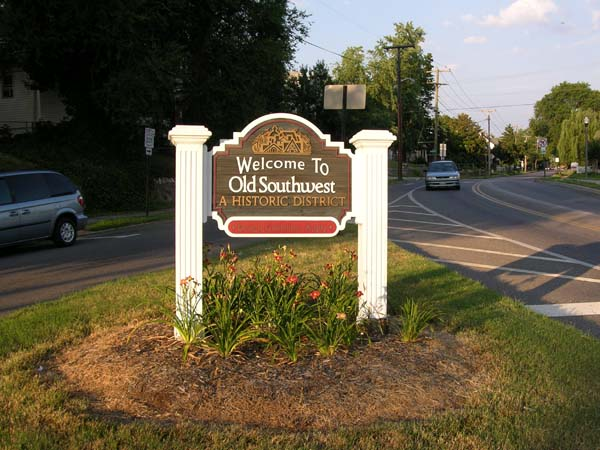
- Gateway signage along Elm Avenue
- Interactive map of Old Southwest
- Coordinates: 37°15′51″N 79°56′41″W
- Country: United States
- State: Virginia
- City: Roanoke
- Elevation: 1,004 ft (306 m)

Population (2000)
  - Total: 3,628
- Time zone: UTC-5 (EST)
  - Summer (DST): UTC-4 (EDT)
- ZIP Codes: 24016
- Area code: 540
- Website: Old Southwest, Inc.

Old Southwest is a neighborhood of the independent city of Roanoke, Virginia, United States. Located geographically near the center of the city, Old Southwest was annexed from Roanoke County in 1890 and developed as one of Roanoke's more affluent residential areas. Today the majority of the neighborhood falls within the Southwest Historic District listed on both the Virginia Landmarks Register and the National Register of Historic Places.

== Location ==
Geographically, Old Southwest is defined by the city as the area bound by Jefferson Street (Virginia State Route 116) on the east, 10th Street to the west, the Norfolk and Western railroad tracks to the south and both Day and Marshall Avenue to the north. It borders the neighborhoods of the Mountain View on the west, Wasena on the south and west, South Jefferson on the south and east, Downtown on the north and east and West End on the north.

== History ==
Annexed from Roanoke County in 1890, the area now defined as Old Southwest was developed primarily between the years 1882 and 1930, to the southwest of Downtown Roanoke. The neighborhood is predominantly residential with commercial generally concentrated along and east of Franklin Road. The neighborhood features a variety of architectural styles including but not limited to Queen Anne, Colonial Revival, Neoclassical, Bungalow, American Foursquare, Arts and Crafts and Shingle, in addition to Roanoke's first public park, Highland Park, opened in 1901.

Old Southwest would grow to become one of Roanoke's premier residential areas from its initial establishment through the years following World War Two when it would see the beginnings of a decline. By the 1970s, the neighborhood would begin to see a turnaround and the subsequent establishment of the Southwest Historic District in 1985. The neighborhood boasts a number of carefully preserved historic buildings, including the Beth Israel Synagogue. More recent improvements to the neighborhood include the completion of the Highland Park dog park, Roanoke's first off-leash fenced dog park, which opened in May 2009, and the opening of the Cotton Mill downtown housing project.

The neighborhood's non-profit civic organization, Old Southwest, Inc, has received several national awards, including the Grand Prize 2010 National Neighborhood of the Year award and First Place in the Social Revitalization category from Neighborhoods USA. It was previously recognized in 2008 with a second place award in the Social Revitalization category from Neighborhoods USA.
