= Raleigh Court, Roanoke, Virginia =

Raleigh Court
- Roanoke Neighborhood
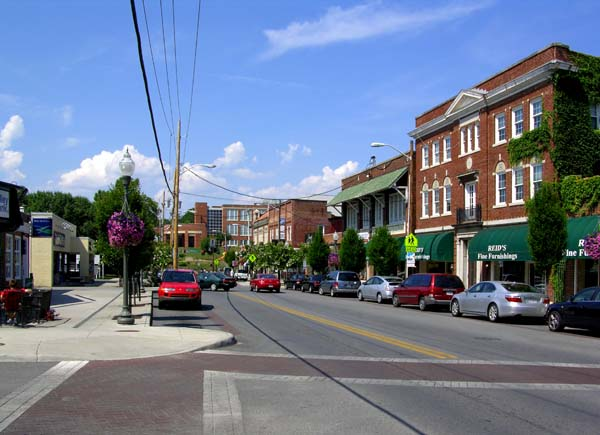
- The Grandin Village
- Interactive map of Raleigh Court
- Coordinates: 37°15′38″N 79°59′02″W
- Country: United States
- State: Virginia
- City: Roanoke
- Elevation: 1,066 ft (325 m)

Population (2000)
  - Total: 11,200
- Time zone: UTC-5 (EST)
  - Summer (DST): UTC-4 (EDT)
- ZIP Codes: 24015
- Area code: 540

Raleigh Court is a Roanoke, Virginia neighborhood located in southwest Roanoke along U.S. 11 (Memorial Avenue/Grandin Road). It borders the neighborhoods of Greater Deyerle on the west, Wasena on the east, Cherry Hill, Mountain View and Norwich on the north and Franklin-Colonial and Grandin Court on the south. Today the neighborhood is accessed from the downtown areas via the Memorial Bridge across the Roanoke River. As of the 2000 U.S. Census, Raleigh Court has a population of 11,200 residents.

== History ==
The Raleigh Court area saw its first residents in the 18th century as part of the Scotch-Irish migration into the area. Remaining relatively rural in character, by 1906 a land development company was formed to subdivide and develop the area. Development of the area would occur quickly, with the streetcar reaching the area in 1915 its subsequent growth resulted in its annexation by the city from Roanoke County in 1919.

The development of the neighborhood would reach its peak in the 1920s with the completion of the Memorial Bridge and the full emergence of the Grandin Village as the commercial center of the neighborhood. It was also during this time the name Raleigh Court emerged as the name of the area, taking its name from the Raleigh Court Corporation that bought and sold the majority of the land in the neighborhood.

On July 31, 1948, streetcar service to the area was abandoned, which also marked the end of streetcar transit altogether within the city of Roanoke. With the closure of the streetcar, the area continued to develop and evolve for the accommodation of the automobile. With threats to the viability and quality of life within the neighborhood by the 1970s, the Greater Raleigh Court Civic League was formed and in 1981. As a result of their advocacy efforts and collaboration with city agencies, Raleigh Court was declared Neighborhood of the Year by Neighborhoods USA in 1992.

The Apartment Building on Windsor Avenue and Brunswick St. was listed on the National Register of Historic Places in 2010.
