= James Madison Middle School =

Magnet school in Roanoke, Virginia

Coordinates: 37°14′56″N 79°58′22″W

Information
- Established: 1970; 56 years ago
- Mascot: Matadors

James Madison Middle School located in the Franklin-Colonial neighborhood of Roanoke, Virginia, USA, is situated on a large hill with a view of the Blue Ridge Mountains. Opened in 1970, it is a magnet school for technology and is part of the Roanoke City Public Schools. The school's athletics teams are the Matadors.

== Notable achievements ==
The school has competed in the Virginia Mathematics 6th Grade League with the following notable results:

- 1998-99 - 5th out of 183 schools
- 2000-01 - 6th out of 141 Schools
- 2002-03 - 5th out of 108 schools

In the international Odyssey of the Mind competition in 2001, James Madison Middle School won through to represent the US and placed 3rd out of a field of 57 teams representing the United States.

James Madison has a notable chess team that in 2005 were runners up in the Virginia State K-8 Team Championships, losing by half a point.
