= Washington Park, Roanoke, Virginia =

Coordinates: 37°17′28″N 79°57′27″W

Washington Park is a neighborhood located in central Roanoke, Virginia, that initially developed in the 1920s as an early Roanoke suburb. It borders the neighborhoods of Roundhill on the north and Williamson Road on the north and east, Gainsboro and Harrison on the south, and Melrose-Rugby on the west. Its northern and eastern boundary is concurrent with Interstate 581, and its southern boundary is concurrent with U.S. Route 460 (Orange Avenue). As of the 2000 census, Harrison had a population of 1,254 residents, with 531 households.

== History ==
Taking its name from the park that lies at the corner of Orange Avenue and Burrell Street, Washington Park developed between 1920 and 1960. The area where the park is now located was a landfill in the 1950s, but was subsequently capped, with the park being established by the early 1960s. The area is also the location of the Lincoln Terrace public housing project, dating from 1952, which has since been refurbished and renamed the Villages at Lincoln.

The Roanoke city landfill was placed in the middle of this black neighborhood. The trash dump became a scene of confrontation between the white city government and the black residents. "At one point in 1963, the Rev. R. R. Wilkinson, then president of the city's NAACP, talked of organizing a 'baby carriage brigade' of young mothers with carriages to block the entrance to the dump and prevent trash trucks from entering." To avoid confrontation, the city closed the landfill.
