= Southwest Historic District (Roanoke, Virginia) =

Historic district in Virginia, United States

- U.S. National Register of Historic Places
- U.S. Historic district
- Virginia Landmarks Register
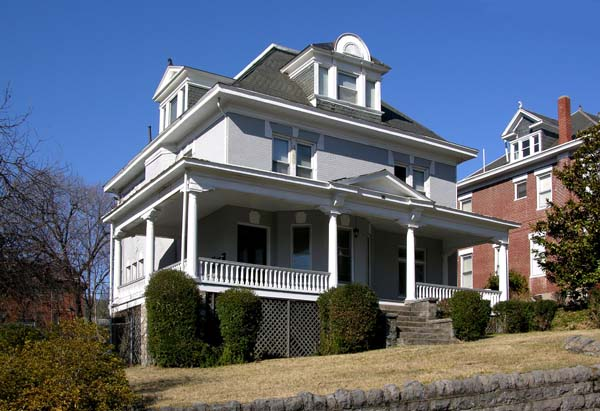
- House in the Southwest Historic District, June 2010

- Location within Virginia Location within the United States
- Location: Roughly bounded by Salem Ave., Jefferson St., Roanoke River and 20th St., also roughly bounded by Westview, Westport, Salem, Jackson, Norfolk, Rorer, Campbell, Marshall, Day, Jefferson, and Clark Aves., Roanoke R., 13th and 21st Sts. St., Roanoke, Virginia
- Coordinates: 37°16′03″N 79°57′21″W
- Area: 375 acres (152 ha)
- Architect: Multiple
- Architectural style: Late 19th And 20th Century Revivals, Late 19th And Early 20th Century American Movements, Late Victorian
- NRHP reference No.: 85001349 (original); 100005882 (increase)
- VLR No.: 128-0049

Significant dates
- Added to NRHP: June 19, 1985
- Boundary increase: December 3, 2020
- Designated VLR: April 16, 1985

Southwest Historic District is a national historic district located at Roanoke, Virginia. It encompasses 1,547 contributing buildings constructed between 1882 and 1930 in the Roanoke neighborhoods of Old Southwest, Mountain View, and Hurt Park. It is a primarily residential district with houses in a variety of popular late-19th and early-20th century architectural styles. The district also includes a small number of commercial structures, churches, and two schools.

It was listed on the National Register of Historic Places in 1985.
