= Melrose–Rugby Historic District =

Historic district in Virginia, United States

- U.S. National Register of Historic Places
- U.S. Historic district
- Virginia Landmarks Register
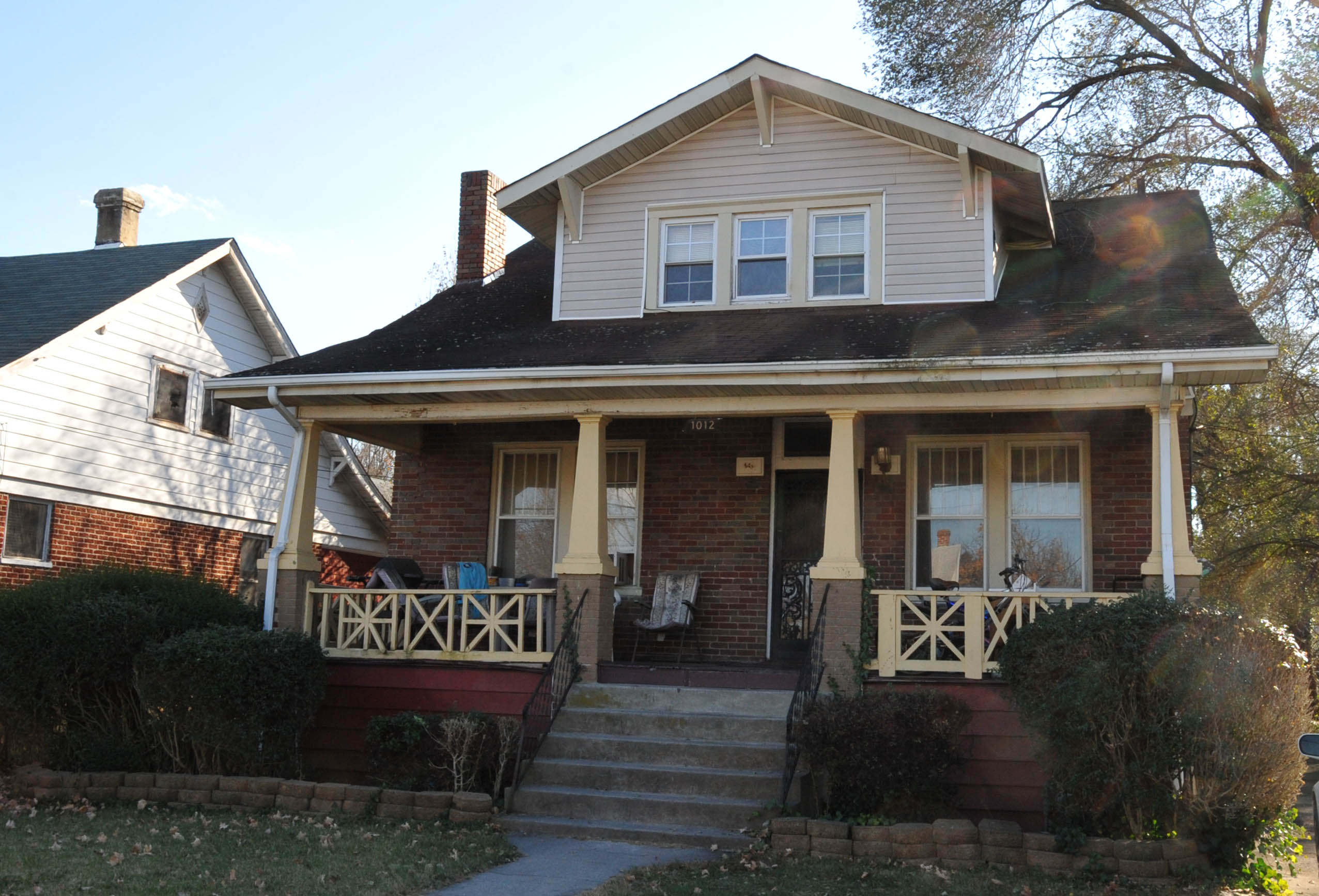

- Location within Virginia Location within the United States
- Location: Mercer, Grayson, & Carroll Aves., NW., Rugby Blvd., NW., 10th, 11th, 12th, 13th & 14th Sts., NW., Roanoke, Virginia
- Coordinates: 37°17′11″N 79°57′17″W
- Area: 57.7 acres (23.4 ha)
- Built: c. 1916-1949
- Architectural style: Bungalow/Craftsman, American Foursquare, Cape Cod
- NRHP reference No.: 13000645
- VLR No.: 128-6261

Significant dates
- Added to NRHP: August 27, 2013
- Designated VLR: June 19, 2013

Melrose–Rugby Historic District is a national historic district located in the Melrose–Rugby neighborhood of Roanoke, Virginia. It encompasses 111 contributing buildings and 2 contributing objects in a planned residential subdivision, with most of the dwellings being built between the late 1910s and late 1940s. It is a primarily residential district with single-family dwellings. The houses include American Craftsman-style bungalow, American Foursquare, and Cape Cod style.

It was listed on the National Register of Historic Places in 2013.
