= Wasena Historic District =

Historic district in Roanoke, Virginia, US

- U.S. National Register of Historic Places
- U.S. Historic district
- Virginia Landmarks Register
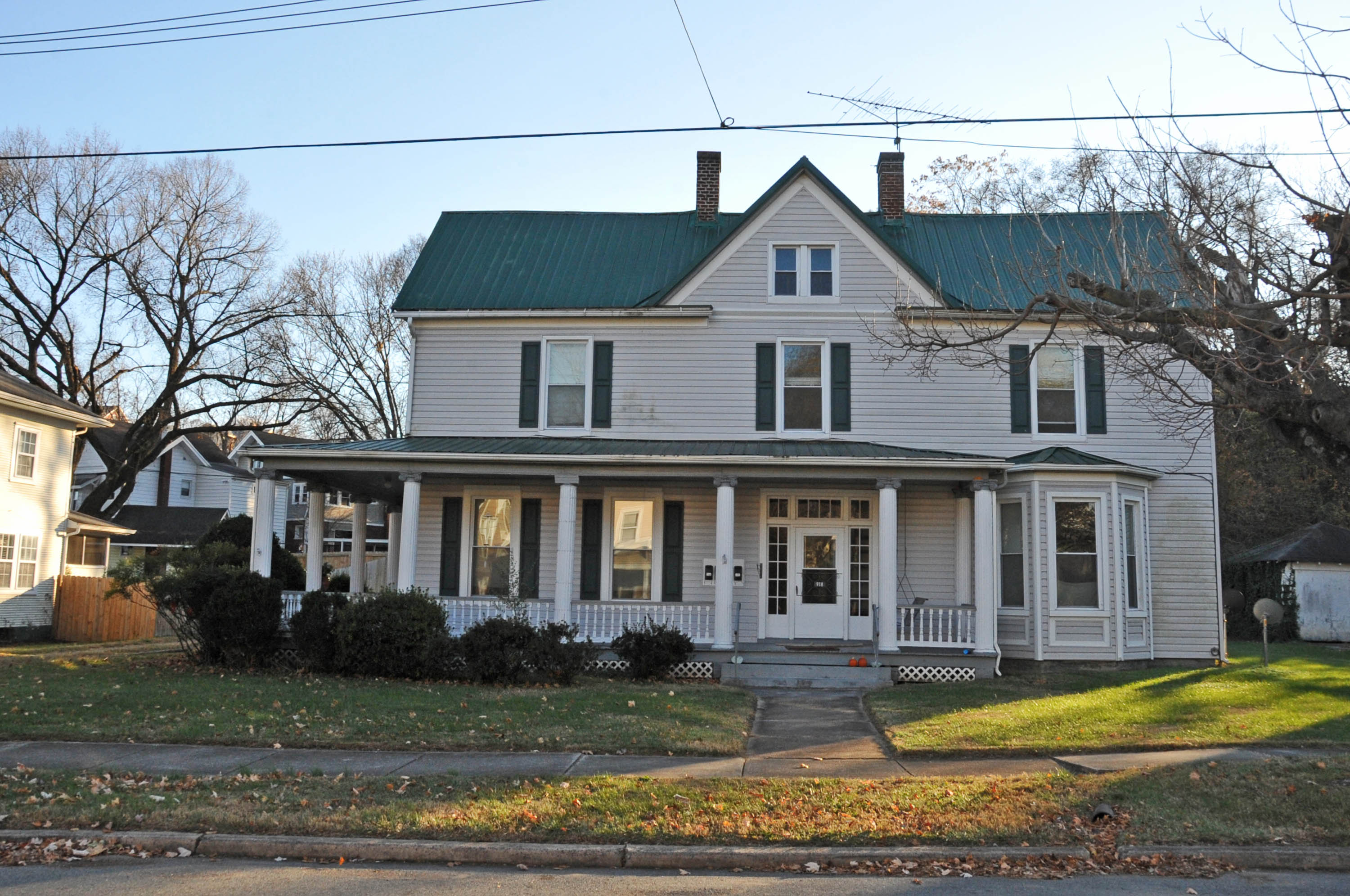
- Howbert House as it appeared in 2008

- Location within Virginia Location within the United States
- Location: Wiley Dr., Winchester, Winona, Wasena, Howbert, Valley, Hamilton, Kerns, Floyd & Summit Aves., Brighton Rd., Roanoke, Virginia
- Coordinates: 37°15′45″N 79°57′40″W
- Area: 174 acres (70 ha)
- Built: c. 1900-1960
- Architectural style: Bungalow/Craftsman, Colonial Revival, Prairie School, Ranch
- NRHP reference No.: 11000984
- VLR No.: 128-6269

Significant dates
- Added to NRHP: January 3, 2012
- Designated VLR: June 16, 2011

Wasena Historic District is a national historic district located in the Wasena neighborhood of Roanoke, Virginia. It encompasses 574 contributing buildings, 1 contributing site, 3 contributing structures, and 3 contributing objects. It is a primarily residential district with single-family dwellings. Also in the district are a few commercial buildings, several industrial buildings, a park along the river and the Wasena Bridge.

== History ==
The district began its development with George Howbert's sale of his house and farmland to the Wasena Land Company in 1910. At the time the only connection to the developed portion of the city was a wooden bridge spanning the Roanoke River; that bridge was reinforced with a steel frame concurrent to the neighborhood being graded and platted (it would be 1939 before the existing span was completed). The oldest structure in the district is the former Howbert home, located at 918 Howbert Avenue and dating to about 1900. The majority of the houses in the district date to the 1920s, though some contributing structures were built as late as the 1960s. The American Craftsman-style bungalow is the dominant style and form followed by the American Foursquare (including Colonial Revival and Prairie style) and the Ranch style.

In 1934, a local businessman and philanthropist donated 28 acres of land bordering the Roanoke River, which would become Wasena Park. The park holds a 1930s era stone picnic shelter as well as a replica of a train station that once held the Virginia Museum of Transportation until severe flooding in 1985 forced its closure. The building was renovated in 2015 and as of 2023 holds a restaurant.A small commercial district exists in the neighborhood just south of the Wasena Bridge consisting of several one-story buildings. That commercial area has seen significant revitalization in the 21st century, as has a former industrial zone in the northeast portion of the historic district.

The district was listed on the National Register of Historic Places in 2012.
