= Henry Street Historic District =

Historic district in Virginia, United States

- U.S. National Register of Historic Places
- U.S. Historic district
- Virginia Landmarks Register
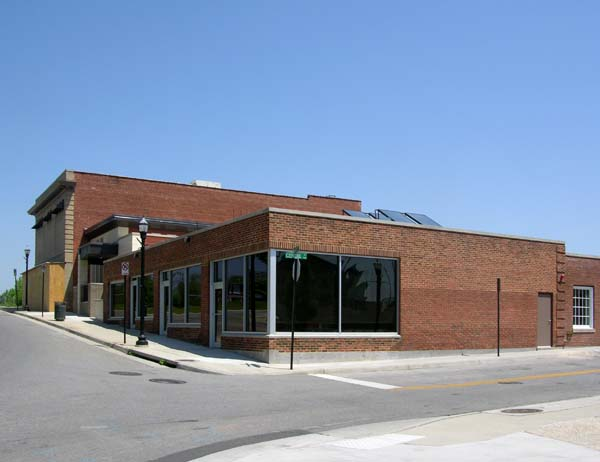
- Henry Street Historic District, June 2010

- Location within Virginia Location within the United States
- Location: 100 blk. of Henry St. NW, Roanoke, Virginia
- Coordinates: 37°16′30″N 79°56′32″W
- Area: 1.2 acres (0.49 ha)
- Built: 1917
- Architectural style: Late 19th And 20th Century Revivals
- NRHP reference No.: 04001276
- VLR No.: 128-5764

Significant dates
- Added to NRHP: November 27, 2004
- Designated VLR: September 8, 2004

Henry Street Historic District is a national historic district located at Roanoke, Virginia. It encompasses four contributing buildings constructed between 1917 and 1951. They were developed as the central business and entertainment district for the African-American neighborhood of Gainsboro in Northwest Roanoke. They are the Hotel Dumas (1917), The Strand Theatre (1923), Dr. Lylburn Downing office (c. 1945), and a commercial building (1951).

It was listed on the National Register of Historic Places in 2004. The buildings are also included in the Gainsboro Historic District.
