= Hurt Park, Roanoke, Virginia =

Neighborhood in Roanoke, Virginia, US

Coordinates: 37°16′32.7″N 79°58′6.12″W

Hurt Park is a Roanoke, Virginia neighborhood located in central Roanoke between the Norfolk Southern railyard and the Roanoke River. It borders the neighborhoods of Cherry Hill on the west, West End on the east, Gilmer, Loudon-Melrose and Shenandoah West on the north across the Norfolk Southern railyard and Norwich across the Roanoke River and Mountain View on the south.

== History ==
The majority of the homes within the neighborhood were constructed in the late 19th and early 20th centuries as mansions for railroad executives based in Roanoke. The residential design of the neighborhood is dominated by the two-story American Foursquare, and since the mid-20th century many have been subdivided into multi-family units. Today the area is the location of the Hurt Park Housing Development and the Hurt Park Elementary School.

The neighborhood is included in the Southwest Historic District, listed on the National Register of Historic Places in 1985.
