= Loudon-Melrose, Roanoke, Virginia =

Coordinates: 37°17′13.49″N 79°58′8.14″W

Loudon-Melrose is a Roanoke, Virginia neighborhood located in west Roanoke south of U.S. 460 (Melrose Avenue). It borders the neighborhoods of Shenandoah West on the west, Harrison and Gilmer on the east, Melrose-Rugby on the north and Hurt Park on the south opposite the Norfolk Southern rail yard.

== History ==
With the continued outward expansion of Roanoke resulting from the completion of the Salem-Melrose streetcar line in the 1890s, by the 1920s this outward residential expansion reached the Loudon-Melrose area. The residential design of the neighborhood is dominated by the two-story foursquare, constructed during the 1920s-1930s.
