= Gainsboro, Roanoke, Virginia =

Gainsboro
- Roanoke Neighborhood
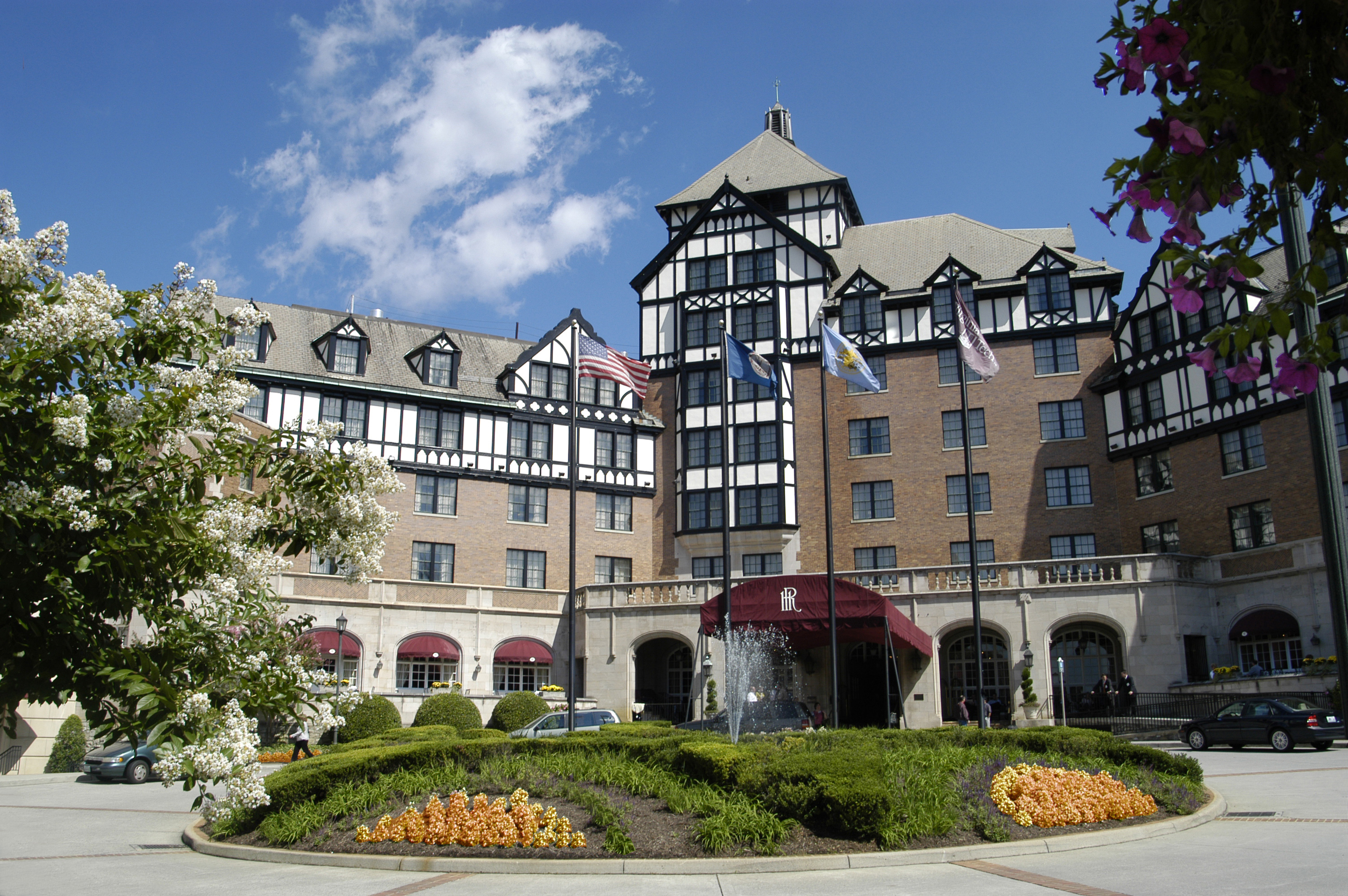
- The Hotel Roanoke has been in Gainsboro since 1882.
- Interactive map of Gainsboro
- Coordinates: 37°16′35″N 79°56′19.4″W
- Country: United States
- State: Virginia
- City: Roanoke
- Elevation: 958 ft (292 m)
- Time zone: UTC-5 (EST)
  - Summer (DST): UTC-4 (EDT)
- ZIP Codes: 24016
- Area code: 540

Gainsboro (/ˈɡeɪnzbʌrə/) is a Roanoke, Virginia neighborhood located in central Roanoke immediately north of Downtown, across the Norfolk Southern Railway right of way, between Interstate 581 and Orange Avenue. It borders the neighborhoods of Harrison and Gilmer on the west, Washington Park on the north, Williamson Road on the east and Downtown Roanoke on the south. As of the 2000 U.S. Census, Gainsboro has a population of 967 residents.

== History ==
Gainsboro traces its origins to the 1835 establishment of Gainesborough settlement. Developed by William Rowland, Gainesborough was established as the Roanoke Valley's oldest town, and takes its name from Major Kemp Gaines, who both founded and provided the early financing for the village. The location of the settlement would shift slightly to the southwest after 1852 following the arrival of the Virginia and Tennessee Railroad and the establishment of Big Lick.

Referred to as Old Lick between the 1850s and 1880s, what would become present-day Gainsboro began to develop as a predominantly African-American community. In 1882, Old Lick and Big Lick would incorporate as Roanoke, and most of its development which still stands today occurred between 1890 and 1940. It was during this time that the area would develop as the center of Roanoke's African American community with Henry Street serving as the cultural and commercial center of the community.

The urban renewal programs of the 1960s and 1970s displaced many families and businesses in the neighborhood and changed the overall urban fabric and character of the area. Today the neighborhood is seeing redevelopment, especially in the areas surrounding the Hotel Roanoke. Established in the 1970s, the Gainsboro Neighborhood Alliance has served as the citizen advocacy group for the community.

Located in the neighborhood and listed on the National Register of Historic Places are the Burrell Memorial Hospital, Gainsboro Historic District, Gainsboro Branch of the Roanoke City Public Library, and Henry Street Historic District. The First Baptist Church was removed after being destroyed by fire in April 1995.

== Notable places and persons from Gainsboro ==
- Hotel Roanoke
- Roanoke Catholic School
- Edward R. Dudley - the first black United States ambassador
- Oliver Hill - civil right lawyer in Brown v. Board of Education
- Lucy Addison - educator who successfully petitioned for full accreditation for Roanoke's first African American high school
