= Mountain View (Roanoke, Virginia) =

Historic house in Virginia, United States

- U.S. National Register of Historic Places
- Virginia Landmarks Register
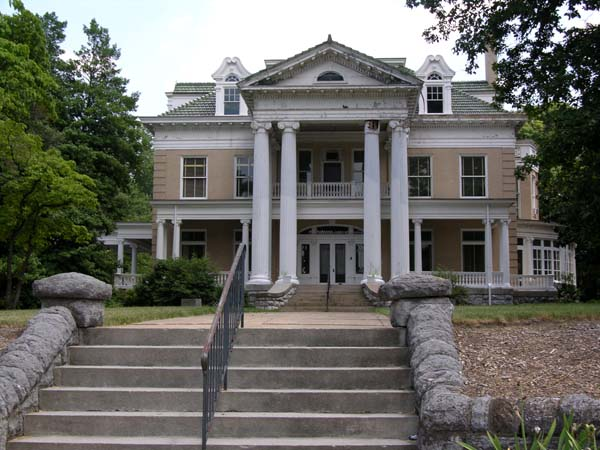

- Location within Virginia Location within the United States
- Location: 714 13th St., SW, Roanoke, Virginia
- Coordinates: 37°16′8″N 79°57′50″W
- Built: 1907
- Architect: Huggins, H.H.
- Architectural style: Georgian Revival
- NRHP reference No.: 80004221
- VLR No.: 128-0022

Significant dates
- Added to NRHP: October 31, 1980
- Designated VLR: June 17, 1980

Mountain View, also known as the Fishburn Mansion, is a historic home in the Mountain View neighborhood in Roanoke, Virginia. It is a 2 1/2-story, rectangular Georgian Revival-style house that was built in 1907. It features a colossal portico consisting of two clusters of three fluted Ionic order columns supporting an Ionic entablature topped by a pediment containing a lunette. It also has a series of one-story porches, a conservatory, and a porte cochere.

It was listed on the National Register of Historic Places in 1980.
