= Harrison, Roanoke, Virginia =

Coordinates: 37°16′54″N 79°57′5″W

Harrison is a Roanoke, Virginia neighborhood located in central Roanoke, that initially developed in the 1920s as an early Roanoke suburb. It borders the neighborhoods of Melrose-Rugby and Washington Park on the north, Gilmer on the south, Gainsboro on the east and Loudon-Melrose on the west. Its northern boundary is concurrent with U.S. Route 460 (Melrose/Orange Avenue), and as of the 2000 Census Harrison has a population of 1,019 residents with 393 households.

== History ==
With many of the existing structures dating from between 1900 and 1920, Harrison is noted as being one of Roanoke's longest established African-American neighborhoods. Some of its more notable institutions include the Harrison School and the Burrell Hospital, which were both the first facilities constructed in Roanoke specifically to serve the African-American residents of the city. Today Harrison is noted for its numerous American Foursquare designed homes and for the Harrison Museum of African-American Culture located in the former Harrison School.
