= Wasena, Roanoke, Virginia =

Wasena
- Roanoke Neighborhood
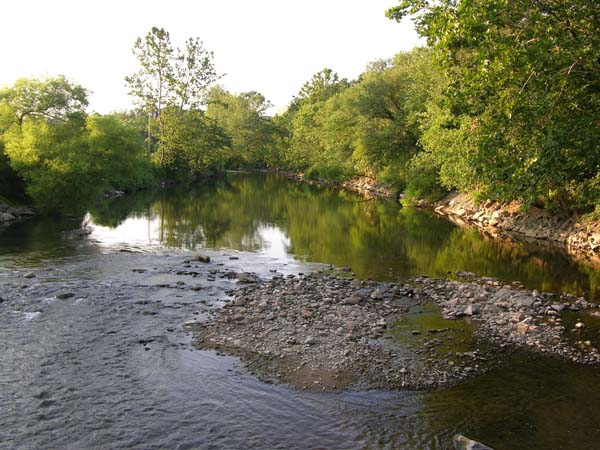
- Roanoke River flowing through Wasena
- Interactive map of Wasena
- Coordinates: 37°15′52″N 79°57′40″W
- Country: United States
- State: Virginia
- City: Roanoke
- Elevation: 1,001 ft (305 m)
- Time zone: UTC-5 (EST)
  - Summer (DST): UTC-4 (EDT)
- ZIP Codes: 24016
- Area code: 540

Wasena is a Roanoke, Virginia (United States) neighborhood located in south, central Roanoke bisected by U.S. Route 221 (Main Street), immediately to the south of the Roanoke River. It borders the neighborhoods of Raleigh Court on the west, Old Southwest on the north and east and Mountain View via the Wasena Bridge across the Roanoke River on the north, and Franklin-Colonial on the south. As of the 2000 U.S. Census, Wasena has a population of 1,633 residents.

== History ==
Taking its name from the Native American word meaning "beautiful view," Wasena was annexed into the city in 1919 and began its development as an early suburb of Roanoke in the 1920s. Nearly all of the structures within Wasena date from between the 1920s and 1950s. The architecture of the area is varied with the largest numbers representing both the American Craftsman Bungalow and American Foursquare design for residential construction. Formed in 1983, the Wasena Neighborhood Forum has been a member of the Roanoke Neighborhood Partnership since 1984, serving as a citizen advocacy group for the neighborhood.

Today, Wasena is the location of the 41-acre (170,000 m^{2}) Wasena Park, Smith Park, Triangle Park, Valley Avenue Park and a portion of the Roanoke River Greenway. Wasena Elementary School is the lone public school located within the neighborhood.

The Wasena Historic District was listed on the National Register of Historic Places in 2012.
