= South Roanoke, Roanoke, Virginia =

South Roanoke
- Roanoke Neighborhood
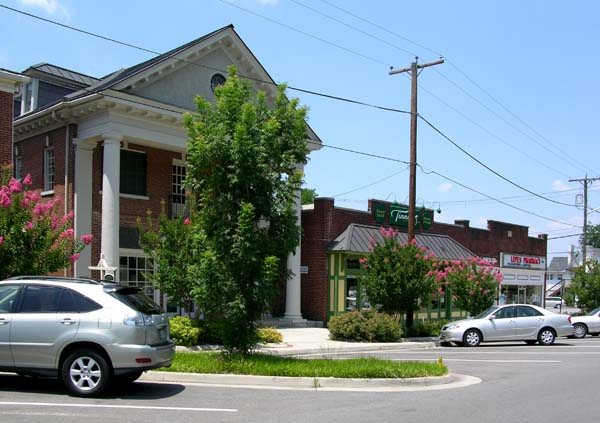
- Crystal Springs area of South Roanoke
- Interactive map of South Roanoke
- Coordinates: 37°14′41″N 79°57′8″W
- Country: United States
- State: Virginia
- City: Roanoke
- Elevation: 991 ft (302 m)

Population (2000)
  - Total: 4,857
- Time zone: UTC-5 (EST)
  - Summer (DST): UTC-4 (EDT)
- ZIP Codes: 24014
- Area code: 540

South Roanoke is a neighborhood located in southeast Roanoke, Virginia, surrounded roughly by the Roanoke River to the north and Mill Mountain to the east, centered on Crystal Spring Avenue. It borders the neighborhoods of Southern Hills on the south, South Jefferson on the north, and Mill Mountain on the east and Franklin-Colonial on the west.

== History ==
The area of present-day South Roanoke was originally settled by Daniel Evans in the vicinity of Crystal Springs in 1750. This area would change ownership between several families through the late 1800s when the remaining property under the ownership of the McClanahan family was sold to the Roanoke Gas & Water Company in 1889. The following year the Crystal Spring Land Company began to develop the community with factories, homes and other associated land uses. Although the community originally sought to incorporate as a city, the area was annexed into the city of Roanoke from Roanoke County in 1915.

Sites of interest presently located within South Roanoke include the Crystal Spring Steam Pumping Station, which is listed on the National Register of Historic Places, and the Crystal Springs entertainment district.
