= West End, Roanoke, Virginia =

Coordinates: 37°16′25″N 79°58′10″W

West End is a Roanoke, Virginia neighborhood located in central Roanoke south of the Norfolk Southern railyard. It borders the neighborhoods of Hurt Park and Mountain View on the west, Downtown on the east, Gilmer on the north across the Norfolk Southern railyard and Old Southwest on the south.

== History ==
Originally residential in character, today the area is dominated by commercial and industrial uses. Today the area is the location of the West End Park.
