= Beth Israel Synagogue (Roanoke, Virginia) =

Conservative synagogue in Virginia, U.S.

Beth Israel
- Hebrew: בית ישראל
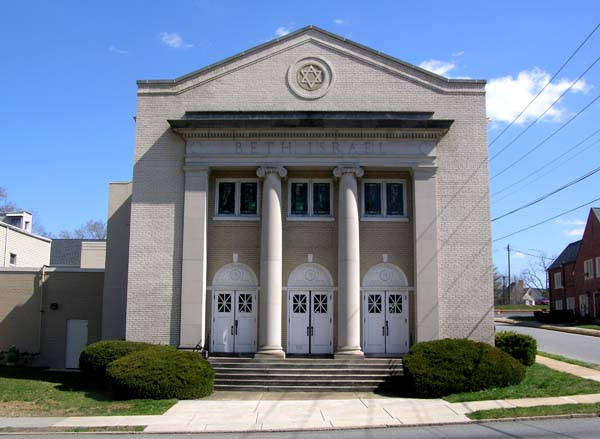
- The synagogue's Ionic portico façade, as seen off Franklin Road

- Location in Virginia

Religion
- Affiliation: Conservative Judaism
- Ecclesiastical or organisational status: Synagogue
- Leadership: Rabbi Fabian Werbin
- Status: Active

Location
- Location: 920 Franklin Road, Roanoke, Virginia
- Country: United States
- Coordinates: 37°15′53″N 79°56′45″W

Architecture
- Architects: Frye and Stone
- Type: Synagogue
- Style: Classical Revival
- Established: 1900 (as a congregation)
- Completed: 1925
- Materials: Brick

Website
- www.bethisraelroanoke.org

Beth Israel Synagogue (Hebrew: בית ישראל) is a Conservative synagogue located at 920 Franklin Road in Roanoke, Virginia, in the United States. The synagogue was founded in 1900, and as of 2009, it had a membership of approximately 160 families and individuals.

The 1925 building, designed by Frye and Stone, combines Classical Revival features in an unusual and rather severe design. A two-story Ionic portico, with an entablature, is engaged with and centered on the stepped gabled and parapeted façade. Doors and windows occupy each of the bays between the columns. A small Star of David occupies the gable.

In 2007 the synagogue completed an expansion and renovation of its building, carefully planned so that the original facade, part of Roanoke's Old Southwest historic district, was unaltered.

Rabbi Fabian Werbin commenced in 2008.
