= Apartment Building on Windsor Avenue and Brunswick St. =

Historic building in Virginia, US

- U.S. National Register of Historic Places
- Virginia Landmarks Register
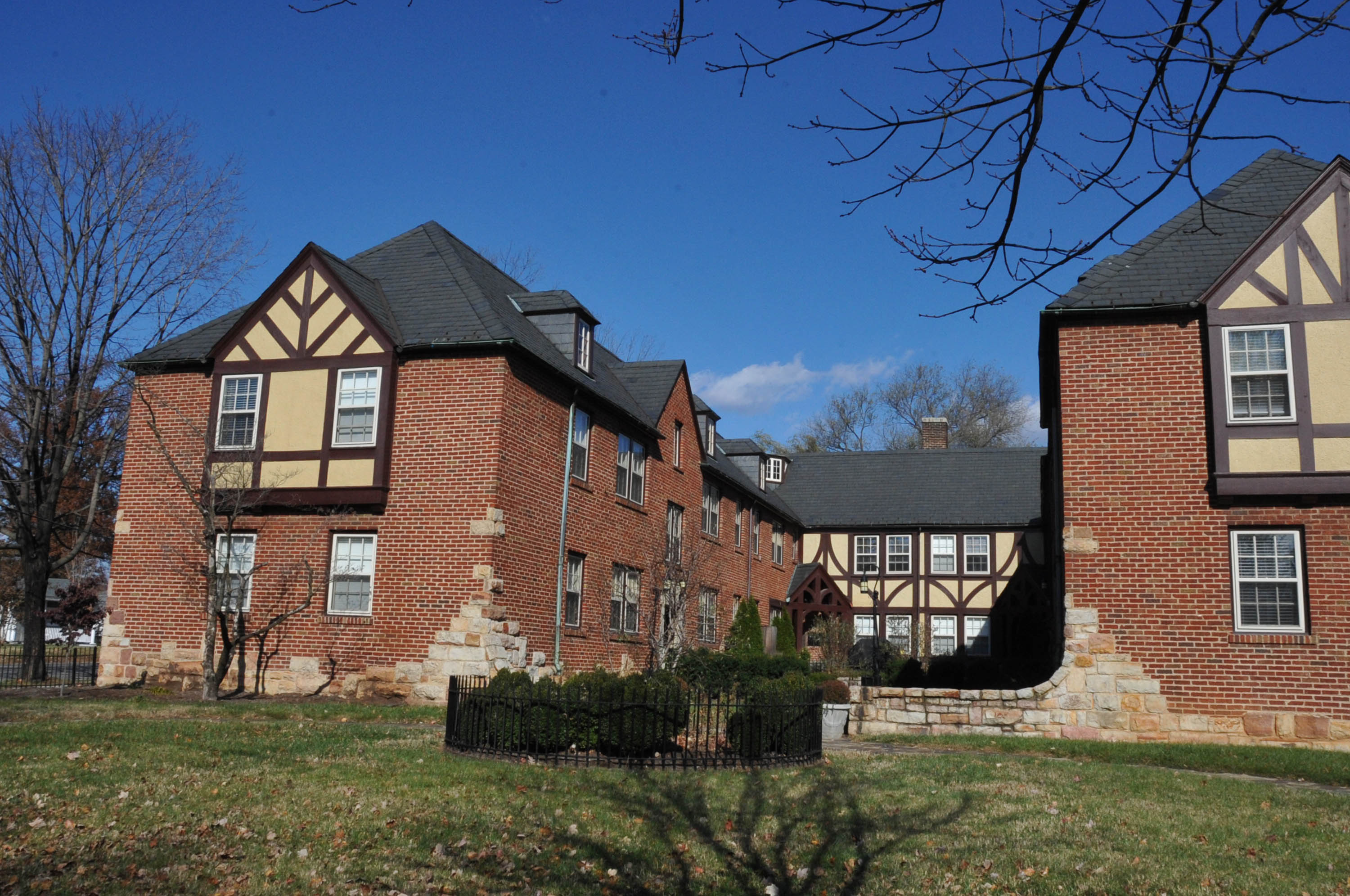

- Location within Virginia Location within the United States
- Location: 2049 Windsor Ave., SW, Roanoke, Virginia
- Coordinates: 37°15′47″N 79°58′49″W
- Area: Less than 1 acre
- Built: 1928
- Architect: Eubank & Caldwell
- Architectural style: Tudor Revival
- NRHP reference No.: 10000559
- VLR No.: 128-6164

Significant dates
- Added to NRHP: August 23, 2010
- Designated VLR: June 17, 2010

Apartment Building on Windsor Avenue and Brunswick St., also known as the Windsor Avenue Apartment Building, is a historic apartment building located in the Raleigh Court neighborhood of Roanoke, Virginia. It was built in 1928, and is a two-story, U-shaped Tudor Revival style apartment building constructed of stone, brick, half timbering, and stucco. The building enclosed a courtyard plaza with stone paved sidewalks, stone walls (2 contributing structures), historic post lights and two decorative pools with waterfall (2 contributing objects). Also on the property is a contributing detached garage.

It was listed on the National Register of Historic Places in 2010.
