= Melrose–Rugby, Roanoke, Virginia =

Coordinates: 37°17′13.49″N 79°58′8.14″W

Melrose–Rugby is a Roanoke, Virginia neighborhood located in central Roanoke, that initially developed in the 1890s as an early Roanoke suburb. It borders the neighborhoods of Roundhill on the north, Washington Park on the east, Loudon-Melrose and Harrison on the south and Fairland and Villa Heights on the west. Its northern and eastern boundary is concurrent with Interstate 581 and its southern boundary is concurrent with U.S. Route 460 (Melrose Avenue).

== History ==
Melrose–Rugby developed between 1889 and 1920, as various land companies subdivided and developed the land within the neighborhood. The primary impetus for the development of the neighborhood was the expansion of the streetcar into Melrose by 1890. The neighborhood is characterized with American Foursquare and cottage style home towards the south and more modern split-level ranch home towards the northwest.

The Roanoke based Woman's Civic Betterment Club was instrumental in cleaning and improving this area in 1907-1912. In preparing the Melrose-Rugby Historic District in Roanoke, the effects of the Woman's Civic Betterment Club were appreciated.

Today Melrose–Rugby is the location of the Roanoke Academy for Math and Science, Eureka Park Recreation Center and the J. F. Kennedy Park. The Melrose–Rugby Neighborhood Forum serves as the communities citizen advocacy group.

The Melrose–Rugby Historic District was listed on the National Register of Historic Places in 2012.
