= Gainsboro Historic District =

Historic district in Virginia, United States

- U.S. National Register of Historic Places
- U.S. Historic district
- Virginia Landmarks Register
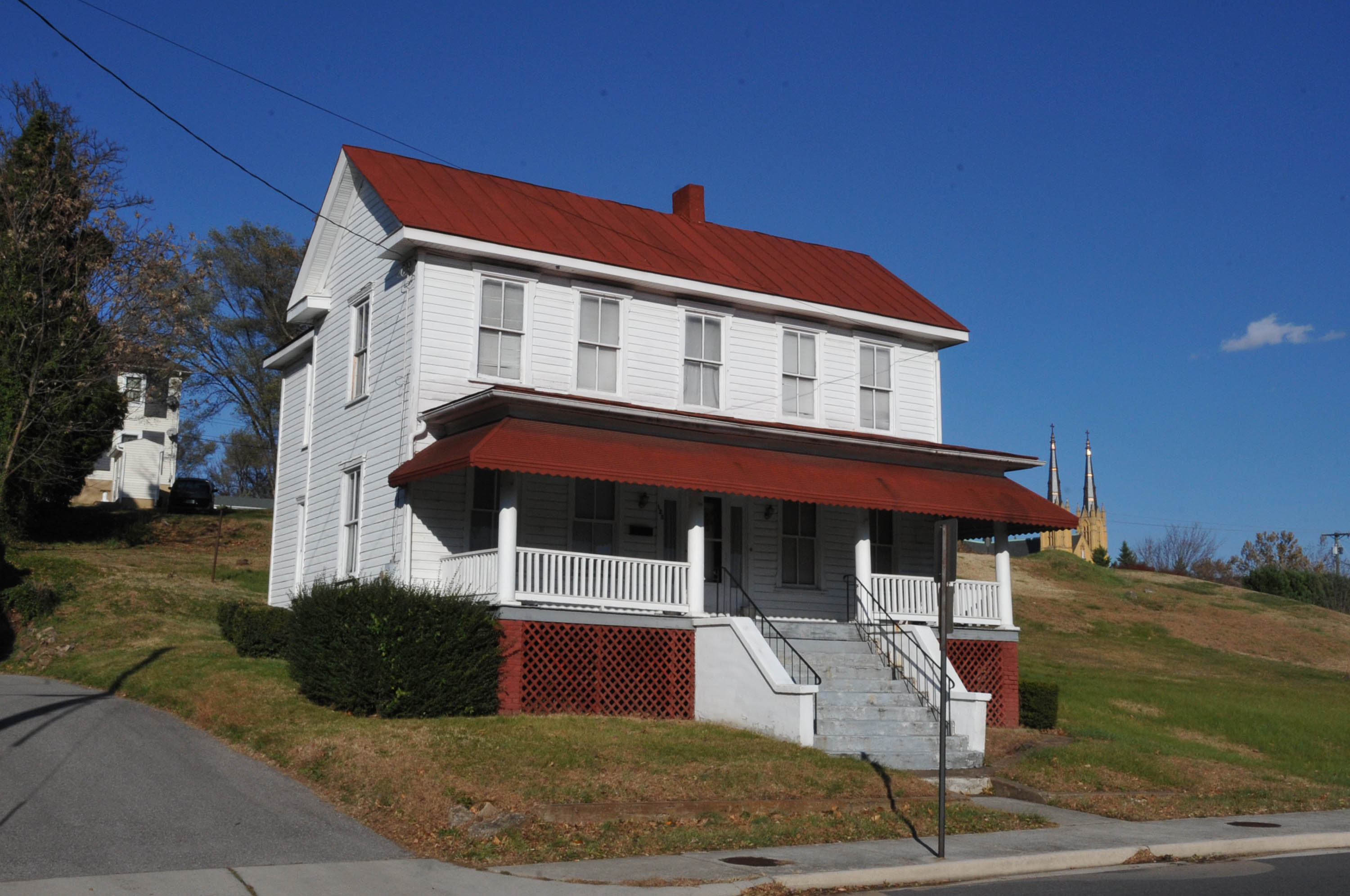

- Location within Virginia Location within the United States
- Location: Bounded by Wells, Centre, 1st St. Bridge and Gilmer, Commonwealth, N. Jefferson and 2nd., Patton, Harrison etc., Roanoke, Virginia
- Coordinates: 37°16′35″N 79°56′32″W
- Area: 73.8 acres (29.9 ha)
- Built: 1852
- Architectural style: Queen Anne, Bungalow/craftsman, et al.
- NRHP reference No.: 05001276
- VLR No.: 128-5762

Significant dates
- Added to NRHP: November 16, 2005
- Designated VLR: September 14, 2005

Gainsboro Historic District is a national historic district located of Roanoke, Virginia. It encompasses 202 contributing buildings and 1 contributing structure in the African-American neighborhood of Gainsboro in Northwest Roanoke. They include single- and multiple-family dwellings, three churches; one parish hall, the Gainsboro Library, a theater, a hotel, two medical office buildings, six commercial buildings, one industry and one bridge. The buildings were primarily built between 1890 and 1925. Located in the district are the separately listed Gainsboro Branch of the Roanoke City Public Library and Henry Street Historic District.

It was listed on the National Register of Historic Places in 2005.
