= Grandin Road Commercial Historic District =

Historic district in Virginia, United States

- Grandin Road Commercial; Historic District
- U.S. National Register of Historic Places
- U.S. Historic district
- Virginia Landmarks Register
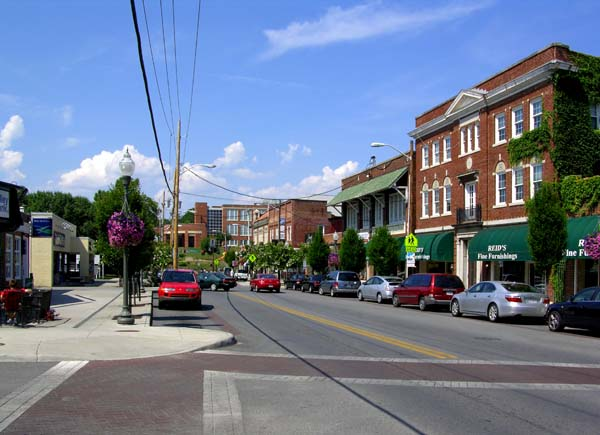

- Location within Virginia Location within the United States
- Location: Grandin Road SW, and Memorial Avenue, Roanoke, VA
- Coordinates: 37°15′55.299″N 79°58′38.2152″W
- Area: 7 acres (0.011 sq mi; 0.028 km^{2})
- Built: 1906-1952
- Architectural style: Classical Revival, Colonial Revival, Spanish Revival, Art Deco and Art Moderne
- NRHP reference No.: 02001450
- VLR No.: 128-5785

Significant dates
- Added to NRHP: November 27, 2002
- Designated VLR: September 11, 2002

The Grandin Road Commercial Historic District, also referred to as Grandin Village, is a historic district listed on the National Register of Historic Places located in the Raleigh Court neighborhood of the independent city of Roanoke, Virginia. Centered at the intersection of Memorial Avenue and Grandin Road (US 11), Grandin Village hosts an array of independently owned retail and dining establishments. The district has been noted as one of Roanoke's best examples of a mixed-use urban village, and has been used as a local model for future mixed-use developments within the community.

== History ==
Grandin Village traces its origin to 1906 with the establishment of the Virginia Heights Land Corporation. This land corporation was responsible for the initial development of Virginia Heights after the opening of the Memorial Bridge, which serves as a connection into downtown Roanoke.

Development at the T intersection at Grandin and Memorial began with the construction of the original Virginia Heights Elementary School in 1907. By 1911, the Roanoke Street Railway Company completed a streetcar line between Raleigh Court/Virginia Heights and downtown. With this streetcar extension, development of the commercial establishments of the present-day Grandin Village accelerated.

In 1919, Virginia Heights was annexed into the city of Roanoke. The majority of the structures in the district were constructed between 1917 and 1945. During this period, the Grandin Village emerged as a major retail and service area serving the residents of southwest Roanoke.

On July 31, 1948, streetcar service to the area was abandoned, which also marked the end of streetcar transit altogether in the city of Roanoke. Much of the post-1950s development within the district was designed to accommodate the automobile. After a period of decline in the mid-20th century, the district has since rebounded and has become a local retail and dining destination.

== Grandin Theatre ==
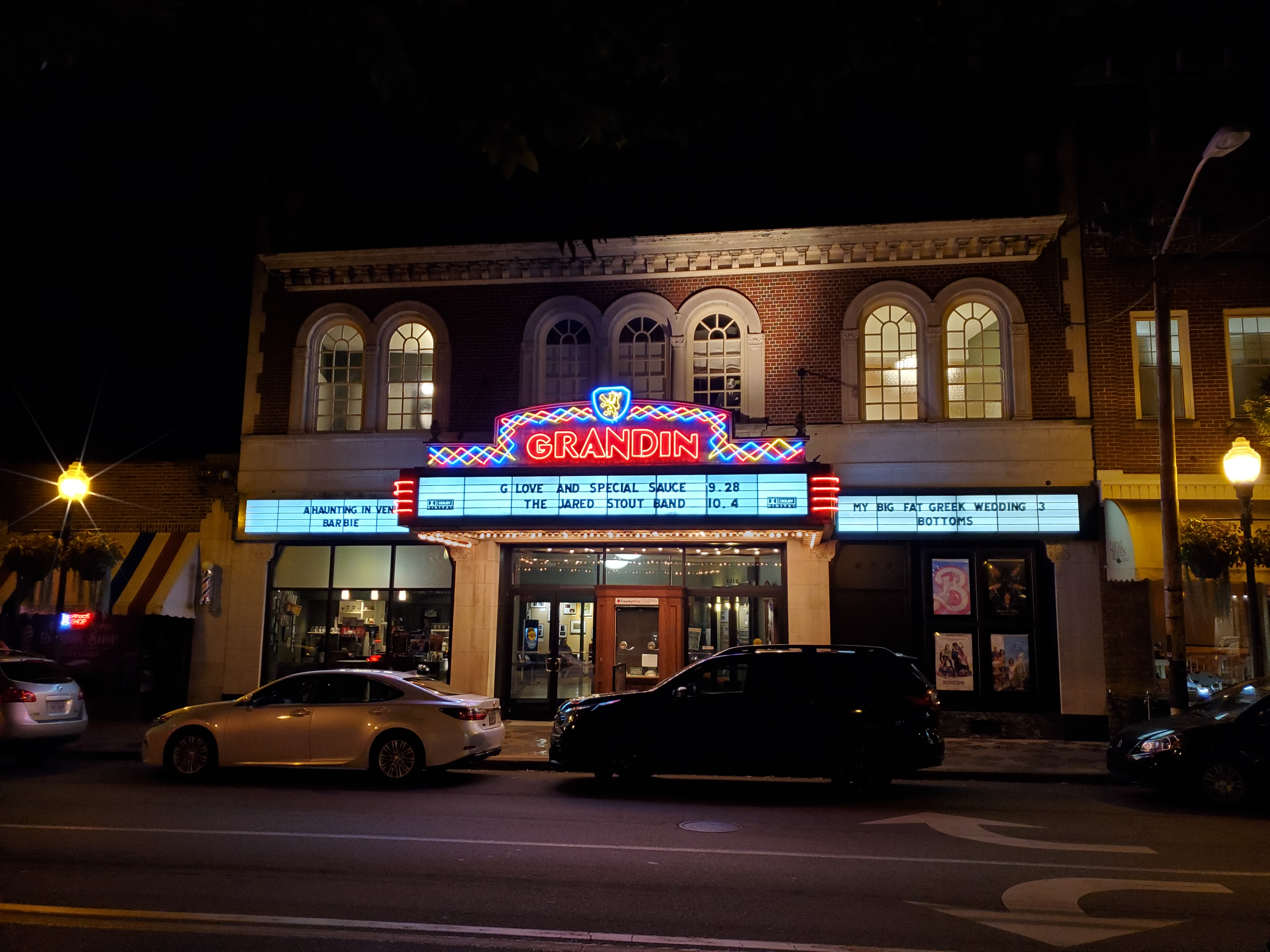
The Grandin Theatre in 2023

The centerpiece of the Grandin Village is the Grandin Theatre, which opened in 1932. Designed by Eubank & Caldwell, its eclectic design features elements of various revival styles, and opened as Roanoke's first suburban movie house. The theatre operated continuously through November 11, 2001, when it closed its doors due to its deteriorating condition. After its closure, the Grandin Theatre Foundation raised enough money to renovate and reopen the theatre on October 20, 2002. The Grandin survives as the lone historic movie theatre in the Roanoke Valley.
