= Gilmer, Roanoke, Virginia =

Neighborhood of Roanoke, Virginia

Coordinates: 37°16′34.73″N 79°56′31.34″W

Gilmer is a neighborhood in central Roanoke, Virginia, USA, abutting the Norfolk Southern rail yard that initially developed in the 1920s as an early Roanoke suburb. It borders the neighborhoods of Harrison on the north, Gainsboro to the east and Loudon-Melrose to the west. Both the West End and Hurt Park are to the south and can be accessed via the 10th Street Bridge across the railroad gulch. Founded in 1980, the Northwest Neighborhood Environmental Organization is the community development corporation active within the Gilmer neighborhood.
