= Grandin Court, Roanoke, Virginia =

Grandin Court
- Roanoke Neighborhood
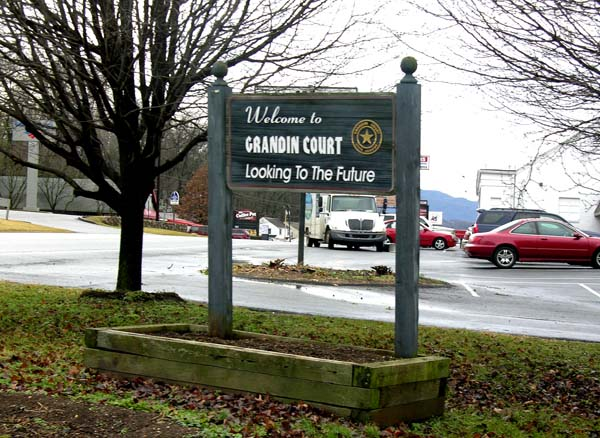
- Welcome signage off Brambleton Avenue
- Interactive map of Grandin Court
- Coordinates: 37°14′55.49″N 79°59′18.14″W
- Country: United States
- State: Virginia
- City: Roanoke
- Elevation: 1,145 ft (349 m)
- Time zone: UTC-5 (EST)
  - Summer (DST): UTC-4 (EDT)
- ZIP Codes: 24015
- Area code: 540

Grandin Court is a Roanoke, Virginia, neighborhood located in southwest Roanoke. It borders the neighborhoods of Raleigh Court on the north and Franklin-Colonial to the south and east. The southwestern border is shared with Roanoke County. As of the 2000 U.S. census, Grandin Court had a total of 1,144 occupied housing units.

== History ==
Grandin Court became part of Roanoke City by way of two separate annexations occurring in 1926 and 1943. Bisected by U.S. Highway 221 (Brambleton Avenue) and bordered by U.S. Highway 11 (Grandin Road) on the north, most of the residential development occurred between 1920 and 1960. Residential development began in the northwest corner of the neighborhood and fanned out from that point, with various style represented, including but not limited to cottage, bungalow and American Foursquare. With the establishment of The Coffee Pot restaurant in 1936, the commercial node of the neighborhood has developed and grown along Brambleton Avenue at the Roanoke County line.

K-12 students residing in Grandin Court attend either Fishburn Park or Grandin Court Elementary School, Woodrow Wilson or James Madison Middle School, and Patrick Henry High School. Grandin Court and Patrick Henry are located in the neighborhood as is the Roanoke Valley Governor's School for Science and Technology.

The neighborhood includes Fishburn, Shrine Hill, and Woodlawn Park, all connected by the Murray Run Greenway. It boasts five tennis courts, a running track, and a nine-hole disc golf course. It is also home to the Grandin Court Recreation Center which exercise classes and an after-school youth program.
