= Lawrence Hamlar =

African American businessman

Lawrence Harrison Hamlar
- Born: Lawrence Harrison Hamlar; November 27, 1921; Goode, Virginia, U.S.
- Died: December 31, 2003 (aged 82)
- Other names: L.H. Hamlar, Larry Hamlar
- Education: Lucy Addison High School; Virginia State University (BA); Gupton-Jones School of Mortuary Science
- Occupations: Civic leader, businessman, philanthropist, mortician
- Organizations: Omega Psi Phi fraternity; Beta Phi boule of Sigma Pi Phi fraternity
- Known for: First African-American member of Roanoke City School Board and its president; co-founder of Pine Valley Golf Association; first African-American member of Shenandoah Club
- Notable work: Co-founder of Hamlar and Curtis Funeral Home
- Spouse: Constance Elaine Johnson Hamlar (m. 1963–1981)
- Relatives: Natalie Lorraine Hamlar-Mason (sister); David Hamlar (brother)
- Awards: Humanitarian of the Year (1993); Noel C. Taylor Distinguished Humanitarian Award (1993); City of Roanoke Citizen of the Year (2001)

Lawrence Harrison Hamlar, also known as L.H. Hamlar or Larry Hamlar (November 27, 1921 – December 31, 2003) was a prominent African-American civic leader, businessman, and philanthropist in Roanoke, Virginia.

Hamlar was the first African-American to serve on the Roanoke City School Board as a member and as its school board president. In October 1959, Hamlar co-founded the Pine Valley Golf Association during Jim Crow segregation, becoming a member of its Pine Valley Golf Association Hall of Fame. He was also the first African-American member accepted to Roanoke's elite Shenandoah Club.

== Early life and family ==
Hamlar was the fifth of nine children born to Robert and Maude Hamlar in Goode, Virginia. The family established permanent residency in Roanoke in 1922.

Hamlar was the brother of Natalie Lorraine Hamlar-Mason wife of Gilbert R. Mason, who both were civil rights leaders in Mississippi.

Hamlar's brother David Hamlar was an educational and civic leader Toledo, Ohio.

Hamlar married Constance Elaine Johnson Hamlar (1922 - 1981), the daughter of a prominent Roanoke real estate company owner, in 1963. They had no children. Constance taught English at Bennett College in Greensboro, North Carolina and at Virginia Western Community College for 11 years.

== Education ==
Hamlar attended Roanoke public schools, graduating from Lucy Addison High School in 1939. He matriculated to Virginia State College (now Virginia State University) graduating with a bachelor's degree in physical education and a minor in business. Lettering in football, Hamlar was a member of the Virginia State University Football Hall of Fame.

Hamlar apprenticed at Citizens Undertaking in Roanoke. He became a certified licensed mortician after completing the Gupton-Jones School of Mortuary Science degree in Atlanta, Georgia. In 1952, Hamlar established the Hamlar and Curtis Funeral Home with his co-partners Cecil and Marilyn Curtis.

In May 1999, Hamlar received an Honorary Doctorate of Humane Letters from Roanoke College. He also received an Honorary Doctorate of Humane Letters from Virginia Seminary in Richmond. He was a member of Omega Psi Phi fraternity and a member of the Beta Phi boule of Sigma Pi Phi fraternity.

== Business, Civic Leadership ==
In the 1960s, Hamlar led a biracial committee of twelve white and black Roanoke business leaders to peacefully desegregate Roanoke, Virginia. Most notably, Hamlar worked with city leaders to quell civil disturbance after the 1968 assassination of Dr. Martin Luther King Jr.

Hamlar's contributions to his native Roanoke Valley spanned many fields, including business, athletics, education and politics. An outspoken advocate of higher education, Hamlar served on the board of Virginia Western Community College for 8 years and as its board's president for 2 years. Hamlar established the Constance J. Hamlar Memorial English Major Scholarship for minority students at Virginia Western Community College to honor his late wife Constance who taught English at the community college for 11 years. In 1994, this endowment exceed $250,000. In 1983, Hamlar established another memorial scholarship in his late wife's name at Roanoke College.

Total Action Against Poverty named Hamlar Humanitarian of the Year in 1993.

Hamlar also co-founded the Pine Valley Golf Association during Jim Crow segregation in October 1959, and was a member of its Pine Valley Golf Association Hall of Fame. He was also the first African-American member accepted to Roanoke's elite Shenandoah Club.

Hamlar was a co-founder of Valley Bank in Roanoke, Virginia. He was also the Chairman of Explorer Park during its formation. He was also a member of Destination Education and helped established the Roanoke Higher Education Center in May 2001. Hamlar also served as campaign manager for former Roanoke Mayor Noel C. Taylor, widely considered one of the most influential leaders in Roanoke, Virginia's history. Hamlar was awarded the Noel C. Taylor Distinguished Humanitarian Award in 1993 and the City of Roanoke Citizen of the Year in 2001. Hamlar served on numerous board including the Roanoke Ballet, Roanoke College as a trustee and 15-year board member, Roanoke Memorial Hospital, Roanoke Symphony Society, and the Roanoke Science Museum.

== Appearance in Jet Magazine ==
Prior to his marriage to Constance, Hamlar was listed in famed African American society columnist Gerri Major's 1958 national Society column within the ubiquitous African American magazine, Jet, as Black Roanoke's Top Bachelor.

== Death ==
Hamlar passed away on New Year's Eve, December 31, 2003 at Roanoke Memorial Hospital after a lengthy illness.
