= Franklin-Colonial, Roanoke, Virginia =

Coordinates: 37°15′3.8″N 79°57′26.1″W

Franklin-Colonial is a Roanoke, Virginia neighborhood located in southwest Roanoke that is bisected by the three primary arterials of Franklin Road, the Roy L. Webber Expressway and Colonial Avenue. It borders the neighborhoods of Wasena and South Jefferson to the north, Grandin Court and Raleigh Court to the west and South Roanoke to the east. The southern border is shared with Roanoke County. As of the 2000 U.S. Census, Franklin-Colonial had a total population of 2,860.

== History ==
Characterized primarily with post-World War Two suburban development, Franklin-Colonial was annexed from Roanoke County in this period. Today the area is known as the location of the Towers Shopping Center, Fishburn Park Magnet Elementary School, James Madison Middle School and Virginia Western Community College.
