= Mountain View, Roanoke, Virginia =

Mountain View
- Roanoke Neighborhood
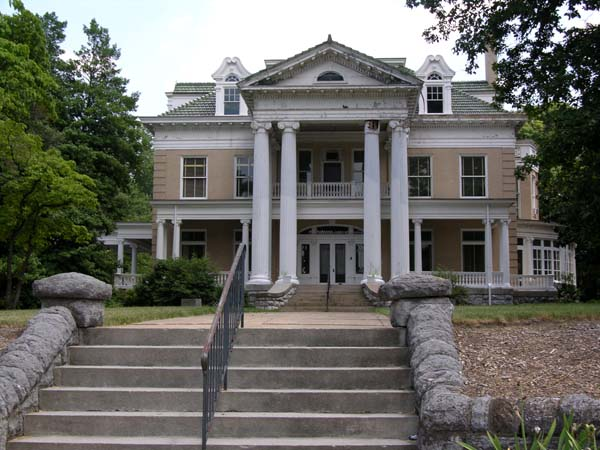
- Mountain View Center on 13th Street SW
- Interactive map of Mountain View
- Coordinates: 37°16′8″N 79°57′50″W
- Country: United States
- State: Virginia
- City: Roanoke
- Elevation: 1,017 ft (310 m)
- Time zone: UTC-5 (EST)
  - Summer (DST): UTC-4 (EDT)
- ZIP Codes: 24016
- Area code: 540

Mountain View is a Roanoke, Virginia neighborhood located in central Roanoke north of the Roanoke River. It borders the neighborhoods of Norwich on the west, West End on the east, Hurt Park on the north and Raleigh Court and Wasena on the south.

In March 2011, This Old House, America’s most respected home improvement authority, selected Mountain View as Virginia’s “Best Old House Neighborhood 2011” in its annual list of “North America’s most timeless neighborhoods—places where lovingly crafted old houses have extraordinary pasts and unarguably promising futures.”

Mountain View was one of 64 neighborhoods in the U.S. and Canada recognized by This Old House, which distributed nomination forms to over 14,000 historical societies, neighborhood groups, and preservation nonprofits to compile its “biggest-ever list of off-the-beaten-path places that are worth eyeing for a great old home.”

== History ==
The majority of the homes within the neighborhood were constructed in the late 19th century and early 20th century as mansions for railroad executives based in Roanoke. The residential design of the neighborhood is dominated by the two-story American Foursquare, and since the mid-20th century many have been subdivided into multi-family units.

The neighborhood is named after Mountain View, a Georgian Revival home in the area, built in 1907, that is listed on the U.S. National Register of Historic Places. It was built by Junius Blair Fishburn, a prominent publisher, banker, entrepreneur and philanthropist in Roanoke in the first half of the 20th century. The home was undergoing extensive exterior renovations in winter 2011.

Portions of the neighborhood are included in the Southwest Historic District, listed on the National Register of Historic Places in 1985.

== Neighborhood amenities ==
Mountain View Center (Fishburn Mansion)

Mountain View, a 42-room mansion, was donated to the City of Roanoke in 1955 by Junius Fishburn to be used for recreational activities. It was placed on the Virginia Landmarks Register and received designation as a National Historic Landmark in 1981. The facility is currently used by seniors groups for cards and games and more widely for fitness and art programs, and is a popular rental facility for weddings and receptions.

Vic Thomas Park / Roanoke River Greenway

The 16-acre Vic Thomas Park, opened in Fall 2010, adds a twist to the Roanoke River Greenway’s gentle system of 10 miles of paved trails. The park features exercise stations, with signs posted along the path, suggesting exercises to work the entire body. The park also offers large areas for gatherings and will soon add picnic tables. The plan is to keep the park as natural as possible, said Donnie Underwood, the city’s parks and greenways planner. A 250-foot-long steel pedestrian bridge spans the Roanoke River from Wasena Park to the new Vic Thomas Park, which was named after the late state delegate who represented parts of Roanoke and Roanoke County in the House of Delegates for 30 years and was known for conservation issues.

West End Community Market

The West End Community Market debuted on June 2, 2010, in the parking lot of the West End Center for Youth at the corner of 13th Street and Patterson Avenue. This farmers’ market, planted by the Local Environmental Agriculture Project, is open every Wednesday, June through September, from 4 to 7 p.m. It switches to winter hours (3 to 6 p.m.) the first week of October, and the market moves inside the adjacent building the first week of November and continues through the holiday season every Wednesday from 3 to 6 p.m. The market operates under the 100-mile rule: All items sold at the market must originate within 100 miles of the market location. And although it is not a rule, the majority of the products sold at the market are produced with organic methods.
