= Hotel Roanoke =

Historic hotel in Roanoke, Virginia

The Hotel Roanoke & Conference Center
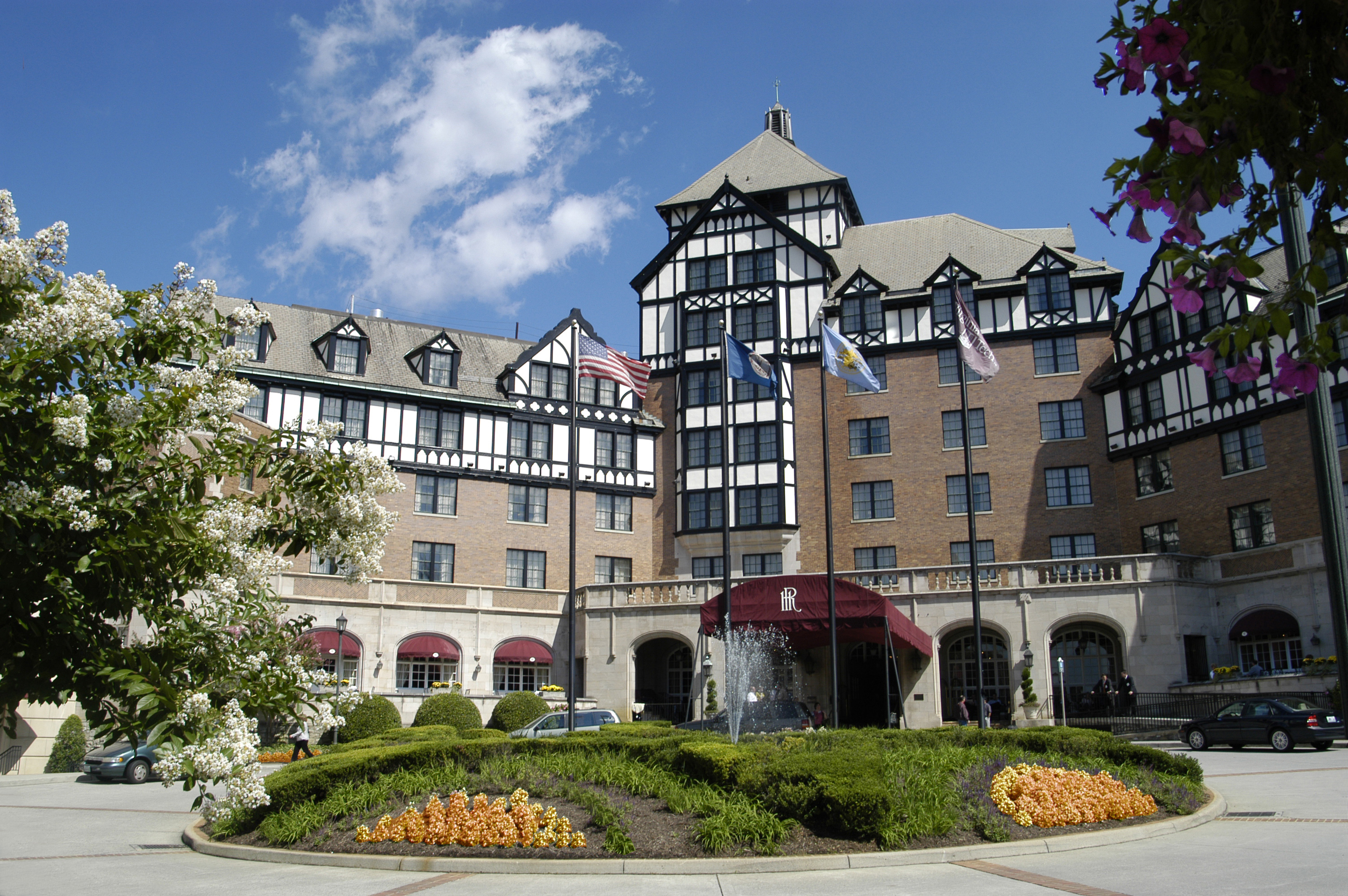
- The 1938 main wing
- Interactive map of the The Hotel Roanoke & Conference Center area
- Hotel chain: Curio Collection by Hilton

General information
- Architectural style: Tudor Revival
- Location: 110 Shenandoah Ave. NW, Roanoke, Virginia, United States
- Opened: 1882
- Owner: Virginia Tech

Website
- www.hotelroanoke.com

References
- Hotel Roanoke
- U.S. National Register of Historic Places
- Virginia Landmarks Register
- Area: 6.5 acres (2.6 ha)
- Architect: Post, George B., and Sons; Small, Smith and Reeb
- NRHP reference No.: 96000033
- VLR No.: 128-0025

Significant dates
- Added to NRHP: February 16, 1996
- Designated VLR: October 18, 1995

The Hotel Roanoke & Conference Center is a historic hotel in the Gainsboro neighborhood of Roanoke, Virginia. Originally built in 1882, the hotel has been rebuilt and expanded many times. The central wing dates from 1938. The hotel is owned by Virginia Tech and operated under the "Curio Collection by Hilton" brand. It was added to the National Register of Historic Places in 1996.

== History ==
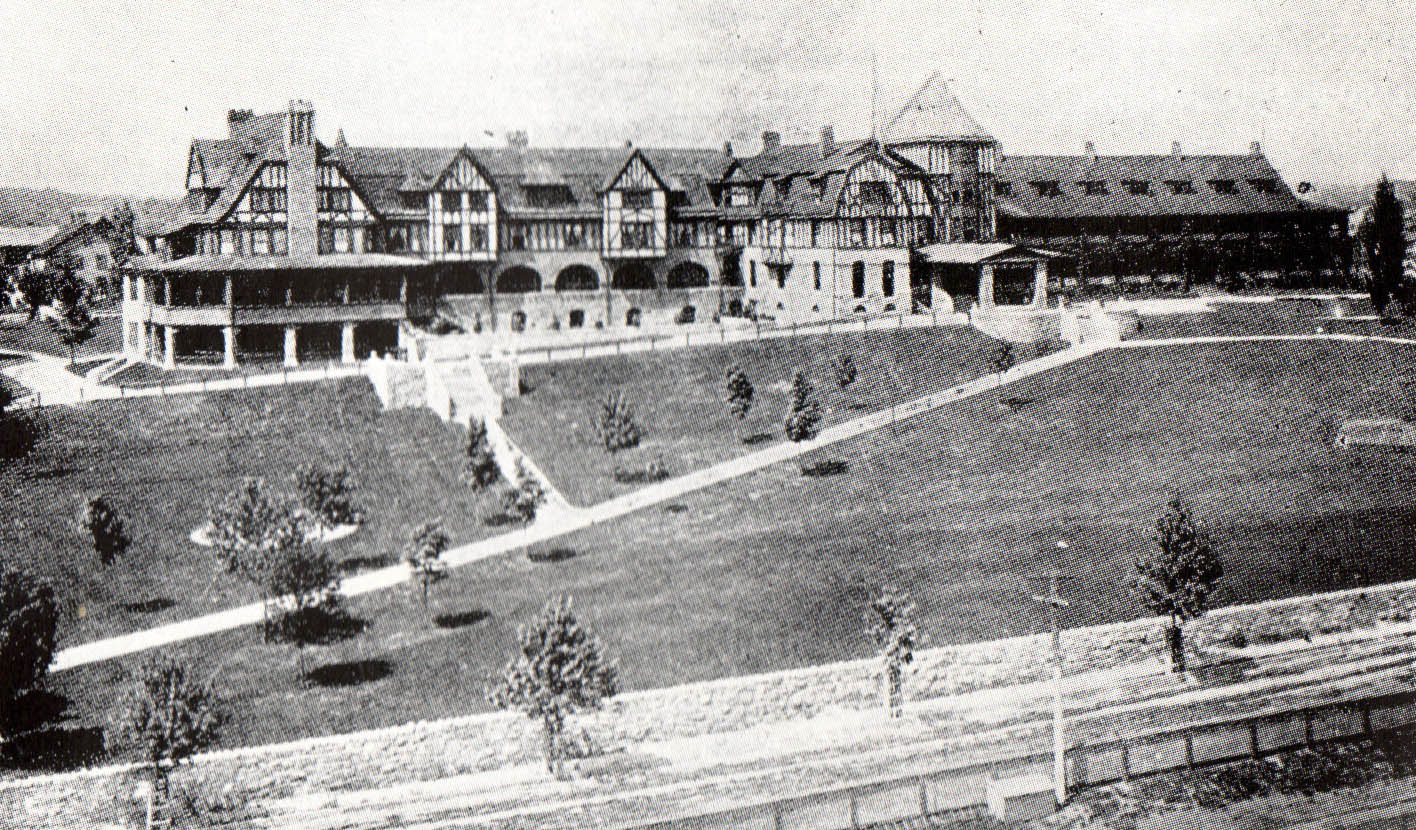
Hotel Roanoke circa 1910. 1890/1898 main wing on the left, 1882 wing on the right

The original structure of the Hotel Roanoke was built in 1882 by the Norfolk and Western Railway (now part of the Norfolk Southern Railway), which had recently constructed its administrative offices in the city, bringing in over a thousand railroad workers. The hotel was designed by Philadelphia architect George T. Pearson in the Tudor Revival style and officially opened on Christmas Day, 1882. A new main wing was added on the western side in 1890, replacing the central portion of the 1882 structure.

In July, 1898, a fire started in the kitchen which burned down the second and third stories of the 1890 main wing and shut down the hotel for several months. The hotel was restored and reopened in January, 1899. In 1916, the last remaining portion of the 1882 structure was moved to the rear of the hotel so a new wing could be added in its place, on the eastern side of the hotel, designed by the Roanoke firm of Frye and Chesterman. In 1931, the surviving original 1882 wing was demolished and replaced. The small 1931 wing, at the rear of the present hotel, is the oldest surviving portion of the structure.

The hotel was completely transformed in 1938, when the 1890/1898 main wing was demolished and replaced with the central wing that stands today, with its tower and the hotel's lobby and public rooms. The new main wing was designed by Knut W. Lind, of the New York firm of George B. Post and Sons, renowned for their hotel designs across the country. In 1946, the 1916 east wing was demolished and replaced with a larger wing designed by Small, Smith and Reeb, of Cleveland, Ohio. In 1954, the same firm designed a small addition at the rear of the 1938 main wing, giving the hotel its present form.

In 1983, employees of Hotel Roanoke went on strike for 6 months after union negotiations broke down. After the strike was concluded, the hotel refused to recall 36 of the striking workers but was ordered to reinstate them when the National Labor Relations Board found that their dismissal violated labor law.

In 1989, Norfolk Southern deeded the Hotel Roanoke to the Virginia Polytechnic Institute and State University (Virginia Tech) for US$65,000. After the flag lowering ceremony on November 30, the hotel was closed. Sale of the contents began and continued for 17 days.

In 1992, the "Renew Roanoke" campaign was launched to raise enough money to reopen the hotel. Virginia Tech had set a deadline of December 31, 1992 to have enough money. By late fall, the campaign was still short $6 million. In an unprecedented Christmas-time fundraiser, the campaign succeeded, raising $5.006 million. Norfolk Southern then donated an additional $2 million; 30 times what it received for the hotel. The Hotel Roanoke was completely remodeled and restored at a cost of $28 million and a new $13 million conference center was built directly adjacent. A pedestrian bridge was also constructed over Norfolk Southern's railroad tracks to link the hotel and conference center to downtown Roanoke near the Wachovia Tower. The Hotel Roanoke reopened on April 3, 1995, managed by the DoubleTree chain.

On 28 February 2016, The Hotel Roanoke & Conference Center transferred within Hilton from the DoubleTree to the Curio Collection by Hilton brand.

== Famous guests ==
In the course of its existence, Hotel Roanoke has played host to a number of famous guests. General Dwight Eisenhower has stayed there, as has Nelson Rockefeller, Spiro Agnew, George H.W. Bush, Gerald Ford, and Richard Nixon when all were vice presidents. Including Ronald Reagan, who was a guest during his time as governor of California, and Jimmy Carter, who had a campaign stop at the hotel, six eventual presidents of the United States have been one-time guests. In 1918 a party consisting of Henry Ford, Thomas Edison, Harvey Firestone, and John Burroughs stopped at the hotel on their way north during one of their famous camping trips in the Southern U.S. The first black guest at the hotel was the American gospel singer Mahalia Jackson, in 1964. Other notable entertainers to have stayed include comedians Jerry Seinfeld and Kevin Hart, the band Aerosmith, and singer Wayne Newton.
