= Lucy Addison High School =

African-American high school in Roanoke, Virginia

- U.S. National Register of Historic Places
- Virginia Landmarks Register
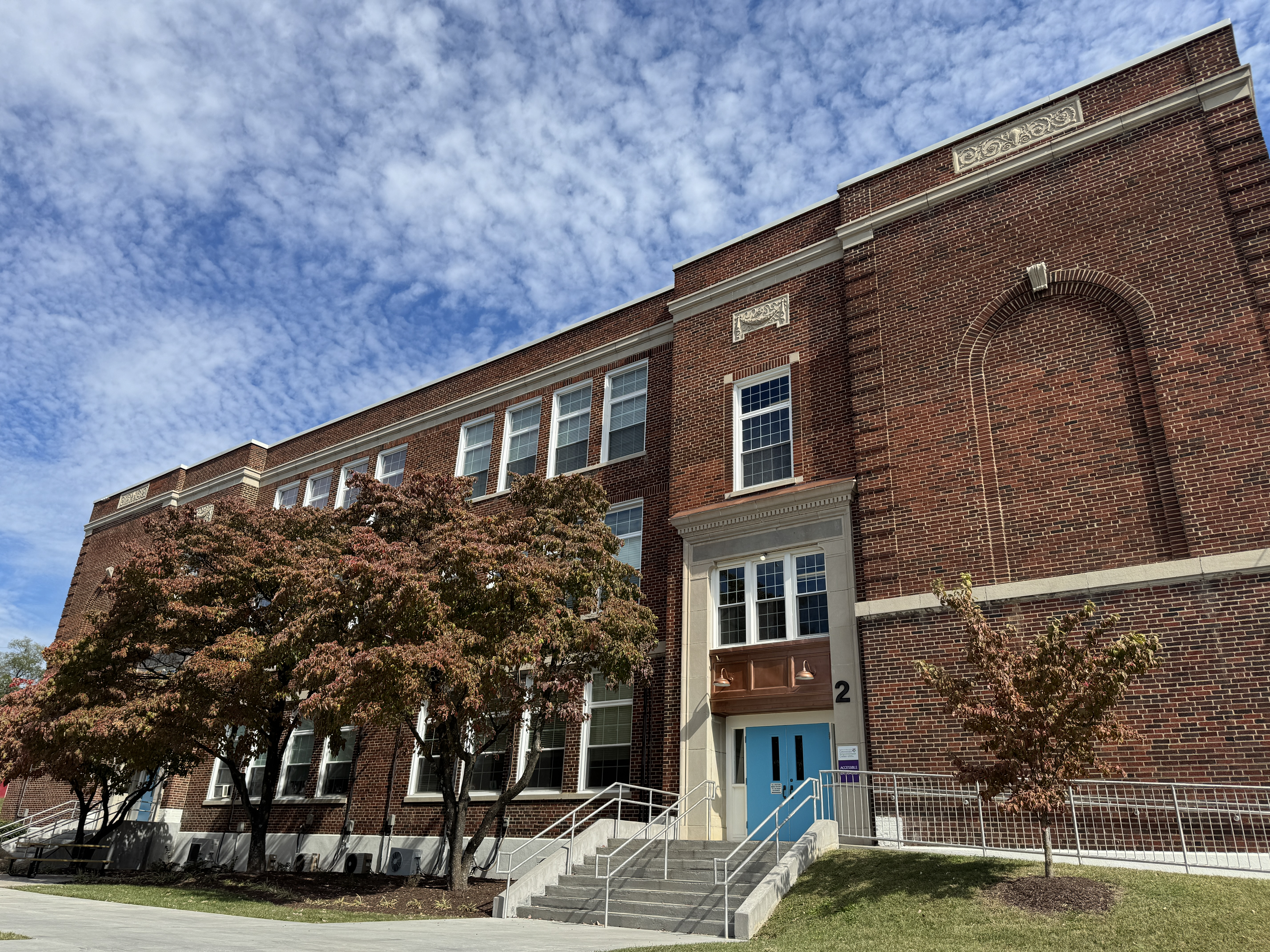
- Lucy Addison High School building in 2025

- Location within Virginia Location within the United States
- Location: 40 Douglass Avenue NW; Roanoke, Virginia
- Coordinates: 37°17′00″N 79°56′24″W
- Area: 1.32 acres (0.53 ha)
- Built: 1928
- Architect: Edward Frye
- Architectural style: Georgian Revival
- NRHP reference No.: 100012118
- VLR No.: 128-6480

Significant dates
- Added to NRHP: August 12, 2025
- Designated VLR: June 12, 2025

Lucy Addison High School was an all-African American high school founded in 1928 during Jim Crow racial segregation in Roanoke, Virginia.

Named after Lucy Addison, a pioneering African American educator and first principal of the segregated Harrison School, Lucy Addison High School became Roanoke's second all-African American secondary educational institution. During its history, the school operated in two separate buildings: at Roanoke's Douglas and Hart Avenues between 1928 and 1952; and at Roanoke's Fifth Street and Orange Avenue between 1953 and 1970.

As a result of Roanoke's desegregation of its high schools in 1963, Addison eventually became an integrated high school in 1970. Though the City of Roanoke closed Addison's doors as a high school in 1973, Addison was converted into Lucy Addison Junior High School. The building now operates as Lucy Addison Junior High School within the Roanoke City Public School System.

== History ==
Lucy Addison (December 8, 1861 – November 13, 1937), a pioneering African American educator who served as the principal of Roanoke, Virginia's now-defunct Harrison School, created a high school curriculum in 1924 to expand beyond Harrison's 8th grade program. After receiving high school accreditation from Virginia's Board of Education, the Harrison School graduated three students in its inaugural 1924 high school class. Addison served as Harrison School's principal from 1917 until her retirement in 1927.

In 1928, the City of Roanoke renamed the school after Lucy Addison. Lucy Addison High School's first structure was built at the corner of Roanoke's Douglas and Hart Avenues, operating at this location from 1928 to 1952. Addison attended the official grand opening of Lucy Addison High School, April 19, 1929. The school graduated its first class in 1929 during the Great Depression.

Lucy Addison High School's second structure was built in 1951 at the corner of Roanoke's Fifth Street and Orange Avenue in the heart of the African-American community. Opening its doors for the 1952-1953 school year, the school graduated its first class in 1953.

As a result of desegregation in the southern United States, the school closed in 1973. Addison graduated its final high school class in 1973.

In 2015, the Lucy Addison High School Alumni Association unveiled a three-piece monument erected in honor of the school's founder, faculty and alumni.

== Administration ==
Lucy Addison High School had seven principals at school's Douglas and Hart Avenue location:

- 1928-1934 - T. R. Parker
- 1935-1939 - Arnett G. Macklin
- 1939-1945 - Samuel Fischer Scott
- 1945-1946 - Sadie V. Lawson
- 1946-1948 - Henry Carpenter
- 1948-1949 - Lewis A. Sydnor Sr. – Principal at Roanoke's Booker T. Washington Junior High School in the 1960s.
- 1949-1952 - Sadie V. Lawson

Three principals at its Fifth Street and Orange Avenue location:

- 1952-1968 - Edwin L Phillips
- 1968-1970 - Julian A. Moore
- 1970-1973 - Charles W. Day

== Notable alumni ==
- Captain Ralph Claytor - Member of the Tuskegee Airmen. Basketball and football standout at Addison High School before attending Hampton Institute
- Lawrence Hamlar - prominent African-American civic leader, businessman, and philanthropist. Founder of Roanoke's historic African American-owned Hamlar Curtis Funeral Home.
- Oliver Hill - Prominent African American civil rights attorney whose work against Jim Crow racial discrimination helped end the doctrine of "separate but equal.". Attended the Harrison School during his family's relocation from Richmond, Virginia to Roanoke, Virginia in early childhood and young adult years.
- Don Pullen, American jazz pianist and organist
