= Memorial Bridge (Roanoke, Virginia) =

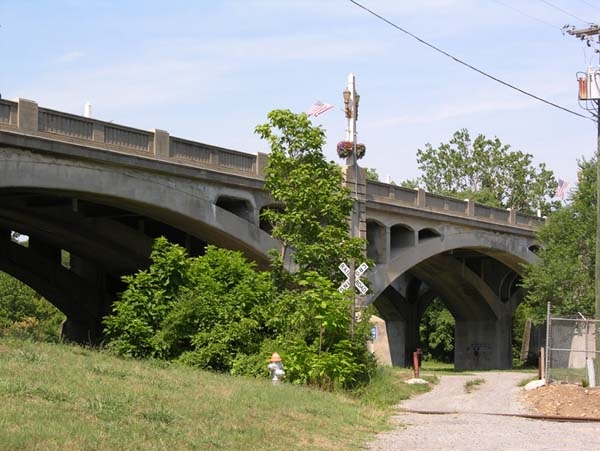
- Coordinates: 37.267596°N 79.967905°W
- Carries: 2 lanes of US 11 (Memorial Avenue), pedestrians and bicycles
- Crosses: Roanoke River
- Locale: Roanoke, Virginia
- Maintained by: Virginia Department of Transportation

Characteristics
- Total length: 785 feet (239 m)
- Width: 54 feet (16 m)

History
- Opened: May 6, 1926

Statistics
- Daily traffic: 13,000

Location
- Interactive map of Memorial Bridge

The Memorial Bridge is a two-lane, 785-foot-long (239 m) bridge spanning the Roanoke River along U.S. Route 11 (Memorial Avenue) in Roanoke, Virginia. The bridge serves as a connection between the southwestern areas of the city (including the Grandin Village area) with central Roanoke. Built by contractor W.W. Boxley, the bridge consists of five 120 feet (37 m) spans, with construction commencing in summer 1925. The bridge officially opened to traffic on May 6, 1926, at a final cost of $282,750.

Although officially open to traffic for over four months, its official dedication occurred on August 30 with U.S. Representative Clifton Woodrum in attendance. The delay in its dedication was attributed to delays involving the creation of the bronze, dedication plaques. It is officially dedicated to Roanoke's veterans of World War I.

The bridge features five plaques, with their contents determined by the Roanoke City Council. Four of them feature quotations from notable historic figures: Patrick Henry, Theodore Roosevelt, Stonewall Jackson and Thomas Jefferson; with the fifth containing the names of all the soldiers from Roanoke who died in World War I. Although dedicated to the veterans who fought in World War I, many did not attend the dedication ceremony due to its not being originally conceived as a monument to former servicemen. The bridge was officially rededicated on November 11, 1991, sixty-five years after its original dedication.

Due to its deteriorating state as a result of corrosion from salt used for deicing in the winter, in April 2002 a major restoration of the span commenced. Costing $1.17 million and completed by spring 2003, the restoration included the replacement of corroded elements, removal of the original Roanoke Street Railway Company streetcar tracks from the roadbed and a resurfacing of the pavement. Additionally, the restoration project incorporated traffic calming principles in reducing the number of vehicular travel lanes from four to two. In addition to the removal of a pair of lanes, both a median and two bike lanes were incorporated onto the bridge.

== See also ==
- U.S. Route 11 in Virginia
