= The Coffee Pot (Bedford, Pennsylvania) =

- U.S. National Register of Historic Places
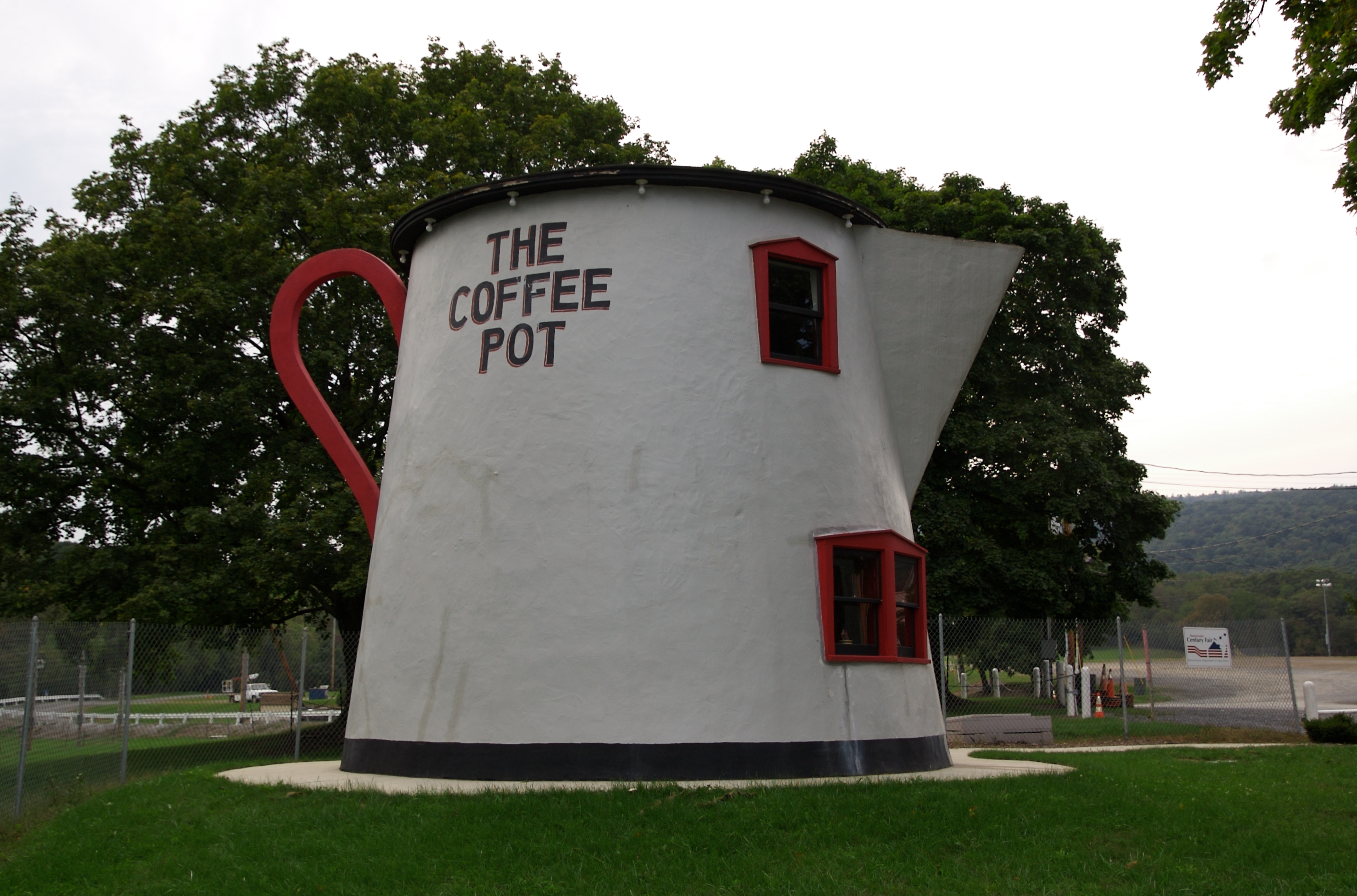

- Location within Pennsylvania Location within the United States
- Interactive map showing The Coffee Pot
- Location: Bedford Township, Pennsylvania
- Coordinates: 40°1′24″N 78°31′0″W
- Built: 1927
- NRHP reference No.: 05000097
- Added to NRHP: February 24, 2005

The Coffee Pot in Bedford, Pennsylvania is an example of novelty architecture. The lunch stand was built in the shape of a coffee pot by David Koontz in 1927. It was threatened with demolition in the 1990s, but in 2004 was moved across the street and restored. It currently serves as a gift shop.

== See also ==
- The Coffee Pot (Roanoke, Virginia), 1936 roadhouse in the shape of a coffee pot
