= Coffeepot (François-Thomas Germain) =

1757 coffeepot by François-Thomas Germain

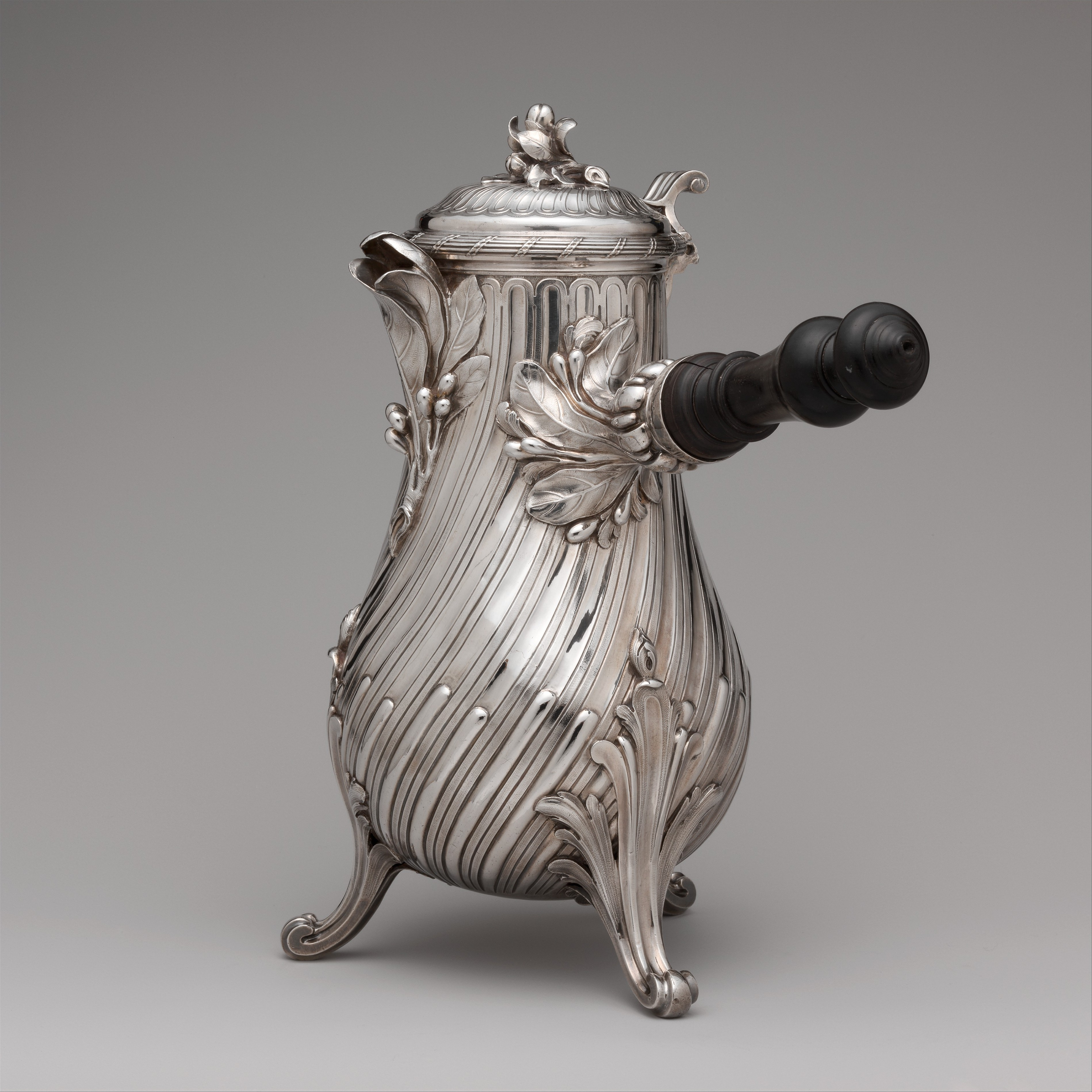
- Artist: François Thomas Germain
- Year: 1757
- Medium: silver, ebony
- Dimensions: 29.5 cm × 30.5 cm (11.6 in × 12.0 in)
- Location: Metropolitan Museum of Art

The Metropolitan Museum of Art holds in its collection a number of items attributed to famed 18th-century French metalworker François Thomas Germain. Among these items is a silver coffee pot dated to 1757. The pot, a surviving example of French rococo dining ware, is currently on view at The Met Fifth Avenue in Gallery 545.

== History ==
The growing popularity of coffee as consumer goods in the 18th century resulted in the production of various types of coffee pots or brewers. While coffee houses and the middle class of Europe employed copper pots to brew coffee, many wealthier consumers commissioned high quality appliances from artisan metalworkers. Created by masters of their craft, the best of these coffee pots were done in silver (which does not rust or tarnish easily) and were often intricately decorated.

François Thomas Germain was a widely noted master silversmith and metal worker in mid-18th-century Paris. The son of another noted metalworking master, Germain gained fame for his production of complete sets of dining ware, including coffee pots. From 1748 to 1765 Germain's work made him the most fashionable silversmith in Paris, at one point operating a workshop that employed over one hundred workers. He often worked on commission for the royalty of France and other European countries. Germain's coffee pot was made as part of a set commissioned by King Joseph I of Portugal.

=== Description ===
The coffee pot is done in silver with a carved ebony handle. The metalwork of the object reflects the Rococo school of art; the raised surface of the silver spirals up the body of the pot, creating the impression of movement. Floral patterns depicting a coffee plant are crafted around the base of the pot's handle, while leaves decorate its feet and legs. The spout of the pot is crafted to further the organic motif of the piece, and another floral arrangement decorates the lid of the pot. The smoothed ebony handle of the piece is detailed to allow for an easier grip.

Germain marked (referred to as a "maker's mark") his work in several locations to relay the details of the pot to a viewer. The marks are as follows:

==== Underside (bottom) ====
- Marked with a crowned fleur-de-lis, F T G (Germain's small maker's mark), and a fleece (Germain's large maker's mark)
- Marked with an A, a charge mark indicating the pot was produced in Paris
- Marked with a Q, a warden's mark used to guarantee the pot was pure silver

==== Inside cover ====
- Marked with another fleur-de-lis, F T G, A, and Q

==== Rim ====
- Marked with a cow, indicating that the piece was intended for export

==== Handle ====
- Marked with a boar's head, a restricted warranty mark for silver products

== Gallery ==
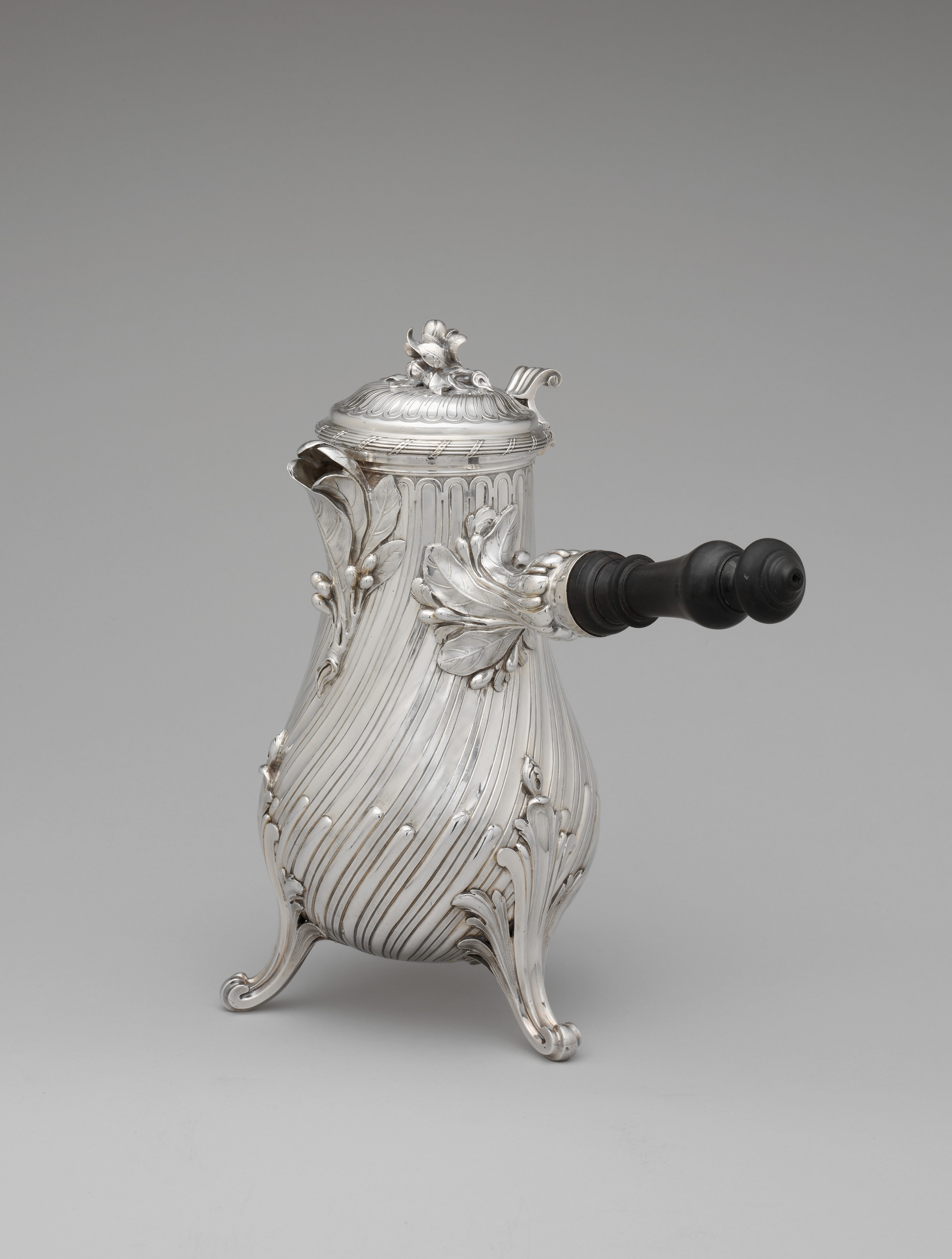
A different image of the pot

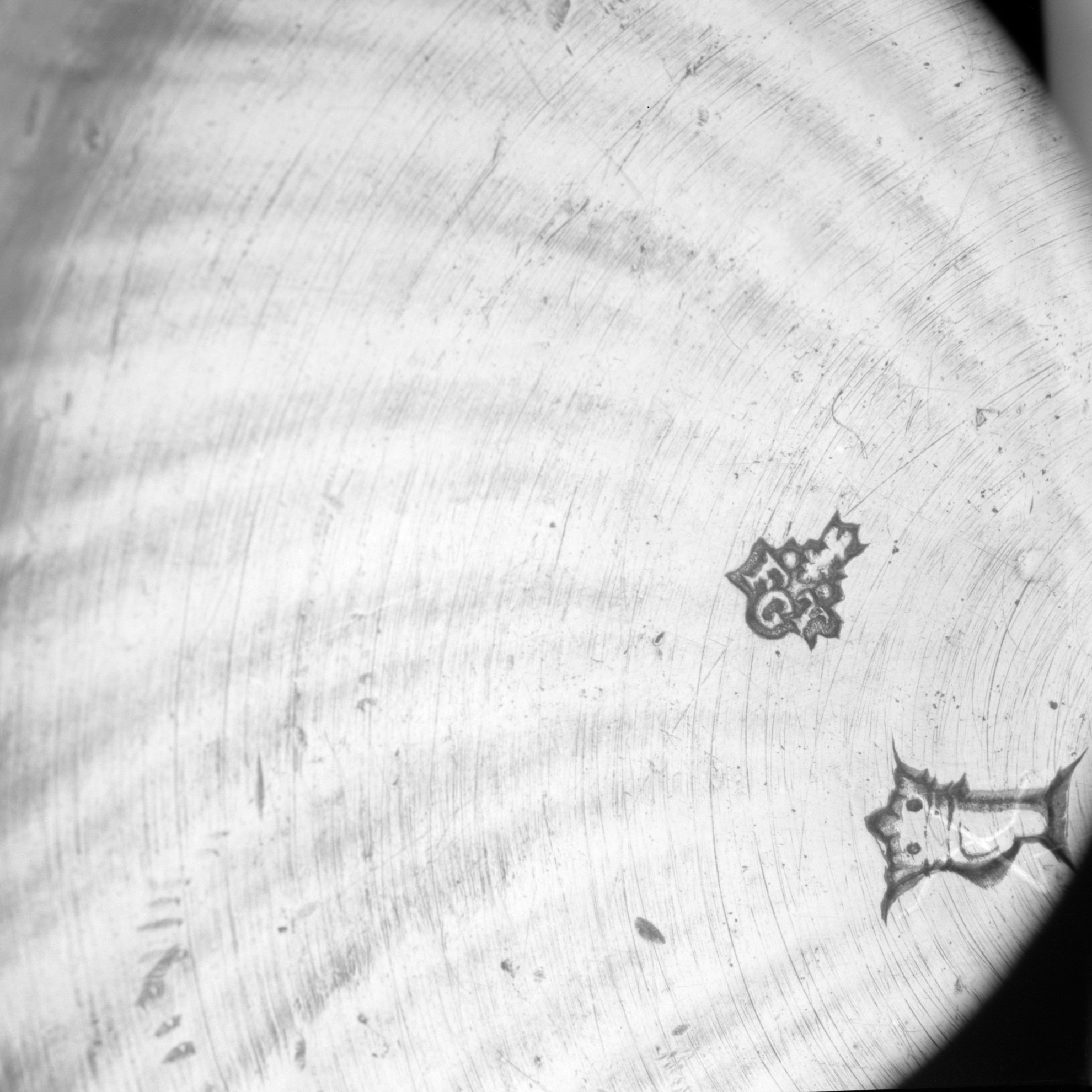
A crowned fleur-de-lis and F T G on the pot's inside cover

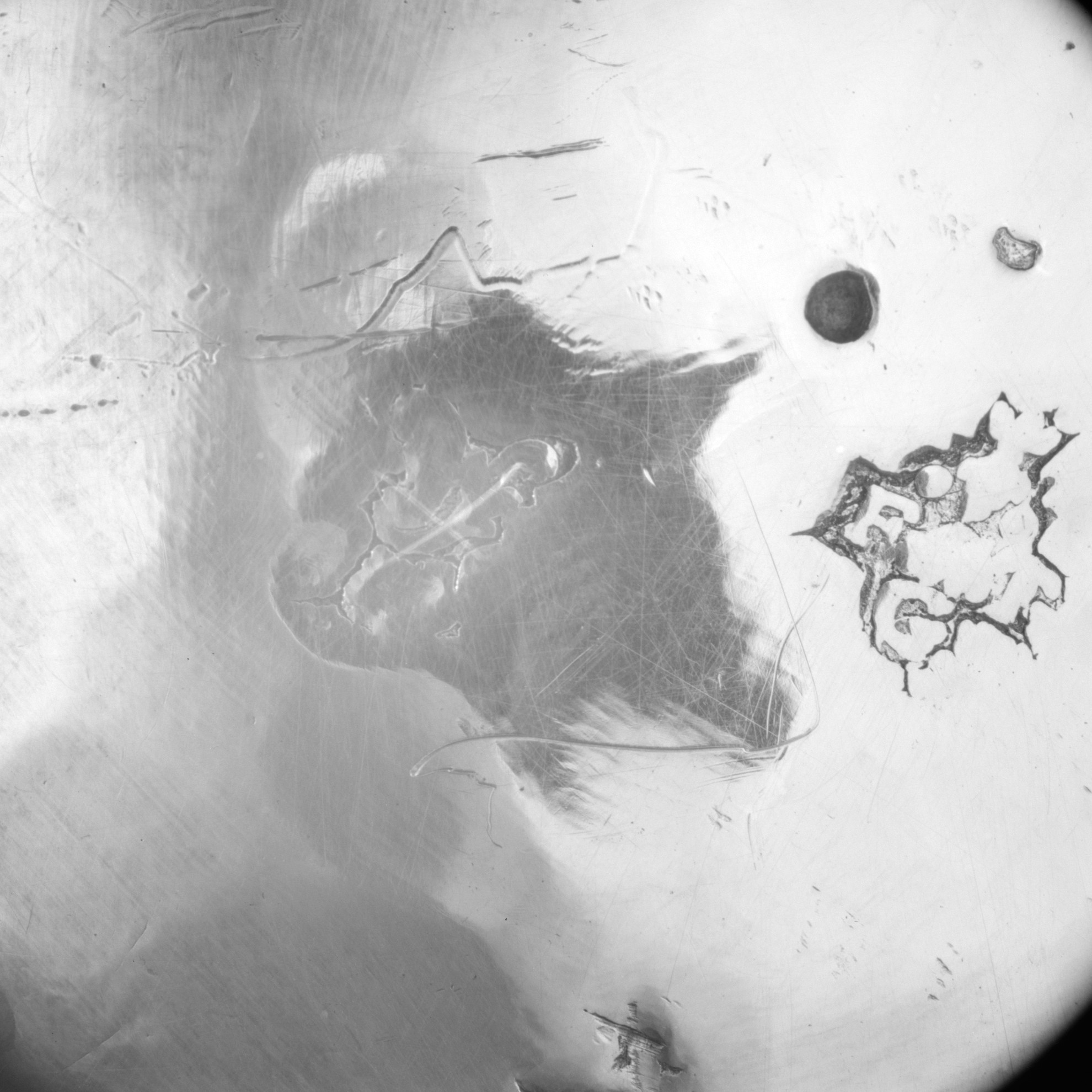
The pot's bottom, marked with a crowned fleur-de-lis, F T G, and a fleece

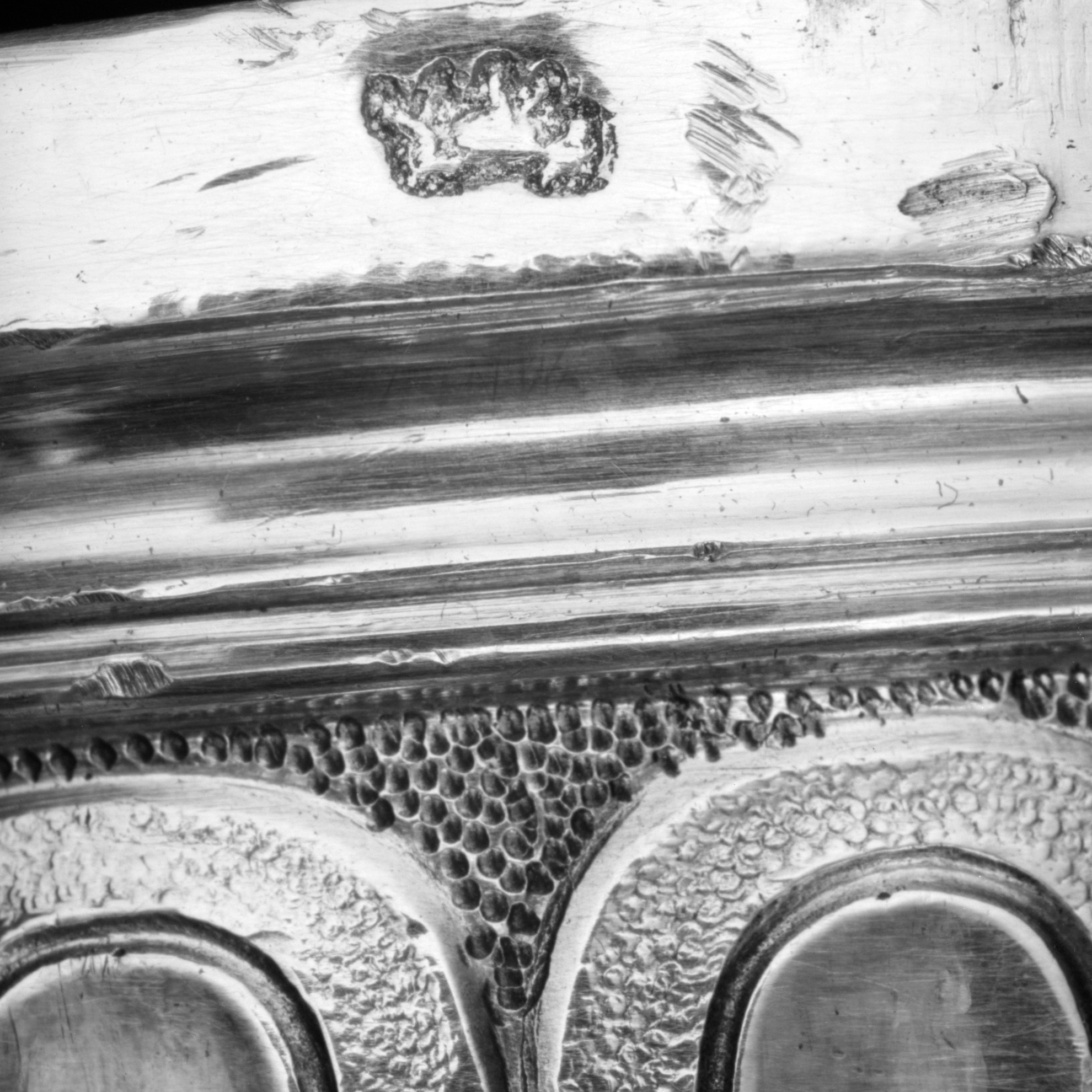
The rim of the pot, marked with a small cow indicating the object is intended for export

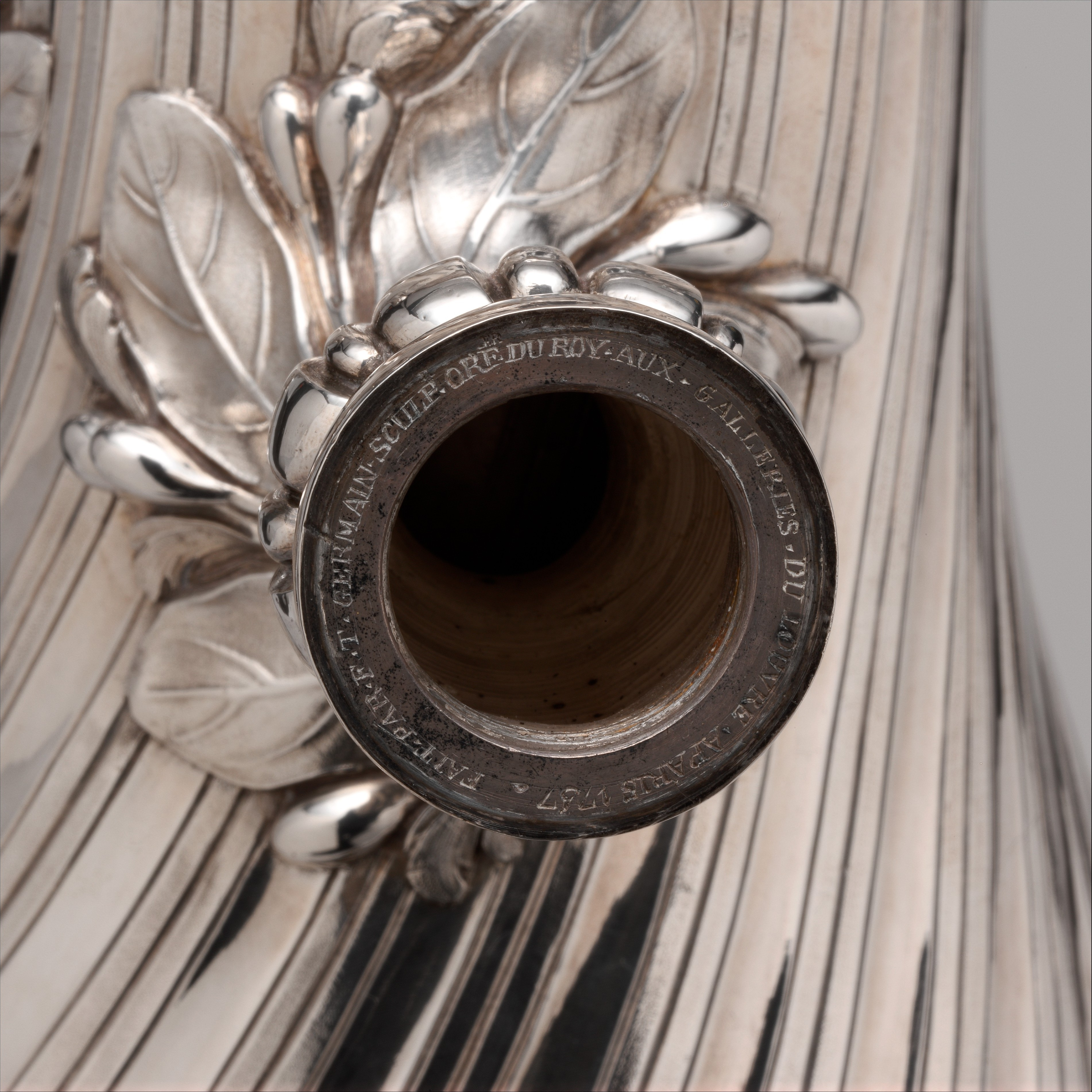
The spout of the pot
