= The Coffee Pot (Roanoke, Virginia) =

Historic commercial building in Virginia, United States

- U.S. National Register of Historic Places
- Virginia Landmarks Register
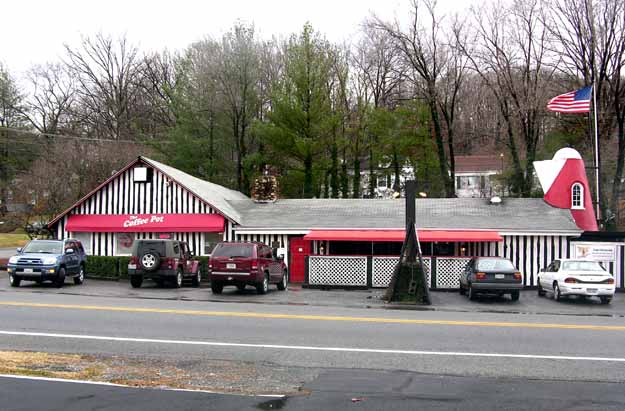

- Location within Virginia
- Interactive map showing the Coffee Pot
- Location: 2902 Brambleton Avenue SW, Roanoke, VA
- Coordinates: 37°14′35.7″N 79°59′28.3″W
- Area: less than one acre
- Built: 1936
- Architectural style: Rustic
- NRHP reference No.: 96000575
- VLR No.: 128-0050

Significant dates
- Added to NRHP: May 31, 1996
- Designated VLR: March 20, 1996

The Coffee Pot is a historic roadhouse listed on the National Register of Historic Places located in the Grandin Court neighborhood of the independent city of Roanoke, Virginia, U.S.A. Completed in 1936, The Coffee Pot is an example of novelty architecture as its distinctive feature is that of a stucco coffee pot structure that is situated on the roof of the building. Today, this remains as the only active roadhouse located within the Roanoke Valley.

== History ==
The Coffee Pot was built in 1936 on what later became U.S. Route 221 (Brambleton Avenue) in Roanoke County, before being annexed into Roanoke City in 1943. It was originally constructed by Clifton and Irene Kefauver as a filling station and tea room, but converted into a roadhouse shortly thereafter. The structure itself is similar to that of a log home featuring vertical log architecture on its four facades. At the time of its construction, it was the first commercial structure one would pass along the highway entering Roanoke from the south. The 15-foot (4.6 m) coffee pot is located on the southern end of the structure and is red with a white spout and top. Steam would formerly rise from the coffee pot spout from a furnace located in the store room below, visually bringing life to the coffee pot structure.

Since its conversion into a roadhouse in 1937, the Coffee Pot has remained in continuous operation; it has been known as the Coffee Pot for its entire history except for a brief period between 1960 and 1963 when it was called Joe's Ranchhouse Restaurant. Throughout its history, the roadhouse has played host to many musical acts including Willie Nelson, Richie Havens, Dickey Betts, Rick Derringer, Ritchie Valens, Danny Gatton, and Root Boy Slim. Regional acts also made the Coffee Pot a regular part of their tour, including SNUFF and the Skip Castro Band. As a result of the numerous big-name acts that have performed at The Coffee Pot, the venue has been dubbed by some as the "biggest small stage in the South."

== See also ==
- The Coffee Pot (Bedford, Pennsylvania), a 1927 lunch stand in the shape of a coffee pot.
