= Lucy Addison =

American school teacher and principal

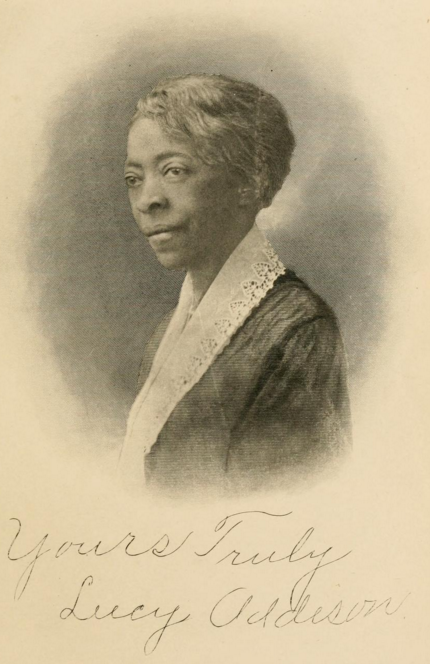
- Portrait of Addison from History of the American Negro and his institutions, published 1917
- Born: December 8, 1861; Upperville, Virginia
- Died: November 13, 1937 (aged 75); Washington, D.C.
- Occupations: Teacher, principal

Lucy Addison (December 8, 1861 in Upperville, Virginia – November 13, 1937 in Washington, D.C.) was an African American school teacher and principal. In 2011, Addison was honored as one of the Library of Virginia's "Virginia Women in History" for her contributions to education.

== Personal life ==
Addison was born on December 8, 1861, in Upperville, Virginia, to Charles Addison and Elizabeth Anderson Addison, both of whom were enslaved. She was the third child born to the couple and the second daughter. After her family was emancipated, Lucy's father purchased farmland in Fauquier County and Addison began attending school. She later traveled to Philadelphia to attend the Institute for Colored Youth and graduated with a teaching degree in 1882. Addison kept her skills current by attending continuing education classes at schools, including Howard University and the University of Pennsylvania. She later served in several supervisory positions, including as a member of the board of trustees for the Burrell Memorial Hospital.

== Education work ==
Shortly after earning her degree, Addison returned to Virginia and began teaching in Loudoun County, Virginia. In 1886, she moved to Roanoke, Virginia to teach at the First Ward Colored School. The following year, Addison began serving as an interim head following the death of the school's principal. She held the position until 1888, when a new school was built and a male principal was hired. Addison then served for over a decade as a teacher and an assistant principal for the school.

In 1917, Addison was hired to serve as the principal for the Harrison School, a school for African Americans. Although the school was only accredited to teach up to the eighth grade, Addison expanded the curriculum to include high school level classes while also continually lobbying the Virginia State Board of Education for full accreditation. Her work came to fruition in 1924, when the board granted the school full accreditation and the school graduated several students with a high school diploma. Addison retired in 1927 and moved to Washington, D.C. to live with one of her sisters but returned to Virginia for several occasions, including the naming of Roanoke's first public high school for African Americans in her honor.

== Death and legacy ==
Addison suffered from chronic nephritis and died in Washington, D.C. on November 13, 1937. She was buried in Columbian Harmony Cemetery. In 1970, her remains were re-interred when the cemetery was moved to Maryland to become part of National Harmony Memorial Park.

Roanoke opened the Lucy Addison High School the year after Addison retired, and she traveled to Virginia to attend the opening ceremony. In the 1970s, the school was almost closed and turned into a vocational school, as Roanoke's desegregation plans proposed busing pupils into neighboring areas. However, U.S. District Judge Ted Dalton ordered the school to remain open. In 1973, the school was restructured and became the Lucy Addison Junior High School, which was later renamed the Lucy Addison Middle School.
