= National Register of Historic Places listings in Grayson County, Virginia =

Location of Grayson County in Virginia

This is a list of the National Register of Historic Places listings in Grayson County, Virginia.

This is intended to be a complete list of the properties and districts on the National Register of Historic Places in Grayson County, Virginia, United States. The locations of National Register properties and districts for which the latitude and longitude coordinates are included below, may be seen in an online map.

There are 8 properties and districts listed on the National Register in the county, including 2 National Historic Landmarks.

This National Park Service list is complete through NPS recent listings posted March 6, 2026.

== Current listings ==
	Name on the Register	Image	Date listed	Location	City or town	Description
1	Blue Ridge Parkway	Blue Ridge Parkway	December 13, 2024 (#100011353)	Blue Ridge Parkway through Virginia and North Carolina; 36°34′12″N 80°54′26″W	Galax vicinity	
2	Stephen G. Bourne House	Stephen G. Bourne House	August 26, 2004 (#04000483)	6707 Spring Valley Rd. 36°44′06″N 81°04′37″W	Fries	
3	Brookside Farm and Mill	Brookside Farm and Mill	November 16, 2005 (#05001272)	4161 U.S. Route 58; 36°37′22″N 81°13′19″W	Independence	
4	Fries Boarding Houses	Fries Boarding Houses	October 29, 2007 (#07001139)	362 and 364 Grayson St. 36°43′02″N 80°58′41″W	Fries	
5	Grayson County Courthouse	Grayson County Courthouse	January 26, 1978 (#78003019)	Main St. 36°37′22″N 81°09′06″W	Independence	
6	Old Grayson County Courthouse and Clerk's Office	Old Grayson County Courthouse and Clerk's Office	February 21, 1997 (#97000151)	Junction of Greenville and Justice Rds. 36°39′17″N 80°57′38″W	Galax	
7	Ripshin	Ripshin	September 22, 1971 (#71000979)	Near the junction of Ripshin and Laurel Creek Rds. 36°41′48″N 81°24′26″W	Troutdale	Also known as the Sherwood Anderson Farm
8	Spring Valley Rural Historic District	Spring Valley Rural Historic District	March 1, 2011 (#11000062)	Spring Valley, Liberty Hill, and Leafwood Rds. in the Spring Valley community 36°44′26″N 81°04′17″W	Fries	

== See also ==
- List of National Historic Landmarks in Virginia
- National Register of Historic Places listings in Virginia
