= Waverly =

Waverly may refer to:

== Education ==
- Waverly Community Schools, a school district located in Lansing, Michigan
- Waverly School District 145, Nebraska
- Waverly Central School District, New York
- Waverly High School (disambiguation)
- The Waverly School, a private school in Pasadena, California

== Populated places ==
- Waverly, Alabama, a town
- Waverly, Colorado, an unincorporated community
- Waverly, Florida, a census-designated place
- Waverly, Georgia, an unincorporated community
- Waverly, Illinois, a small city
- Waverly Lake, Illinois, a reservoir
- Waverly, Indiana, an unincorporated community
- Waverly, Iowa, a city
- Waverly, Kansas, a city
- Waverly, Kentucky, a city
- Waverly, Louisiana, an unincorporated community
- Waverly, Baltimore, Maryland, a neighborhood
- Waverly, Michigan, an unincorporated community and census-designated place
- Waverly Township, Cheboygan County, Michigan
- Waverly Township, Van Buren County, Michigan
- Waverly, Minnesota, a city
- Waverly Township, Minnesota
- Waverly, Mississippi, an unincorporated community
- Waverly, Missouri, a city
- Waverly Township, Lincoln County, Missouri, an inactive township
- Waverly, Nebraska, a city
- Waverly, Franklin County, New York, a town
- Waverly, Tioga County, New York, a village
- Waverly, Ohio, a village
- Waverly Township, Pennsylvania
- Waverly, Pennsylvania, an unincorporated community within the above township
- Waverly, South Dakota, an unincorporated community and census-designated place
- Waverly, Tennessee, a city
- Waverly (Old Wavery) and New Waverly, populated areas next to Sam Houston National Forest, in Texas
- Waverly, Virginia, a town
- Waverly, Caroline County, Virginia, an unincorporated community
- Waverly, Washington, a town
- Waverly, West Virginia, a census-designated place
- Waverly, Wisconsin, an unincorporated community

== Hotels ==
- Hotel Waverly, Toronto, Ontario, Canada
- Hotel Waverly (New Bedford, Massachusetts), United States, on the National Register of Historic Places
- The Waverly, Hendersonville, North Carolina, United States, a historic hotel on the National Register of Historic Places

== Houses ==
- Waverly House (Waverly, Iowa), on the National Register of Historic Places
- Waverly (Croom, Maryland), a historic home on the National Register of Historic Places
- Waverly (Marriottsville, Maryland), a home on the National Register of Historic Places
- Waverley (West Point, Mississippi), 19th-century mansion and National Historic Landmark; also spelled Waverly
- Waverly Historic District, (Columbia, South Carolina), a National Register of Historic Places District
- Waverly (Chappell Hill, Texas), on the National Register of Historic Places listings in Washington County, Texas
- Waverly (Burnt Chimney, Virginia), on National Register of Historic Places
- Waverly (Leesburg, Virginia), on the National Register of Historic Places
- Waverly (Middleburg, Virginia), on the National Register of Historic Places
- Waverly (London, Ontario), designated under the Ontario Heritage Act

== Other uses ==
- Waverly (given name), including a list of people and fictional characters
- Alexander Waverly, a fictional character in the 1960s TV series The Man from U.N.C.L.E. and The Girl from U.N.C.L.E.
- Waverly Glacier, Palmer Land, Antarctica
- Waverly Plantation (Leon County, Florida), United States
- Waverly Plantation (Cunningham, North Carolina), United States, on the National Register of Historic Places
- Waverly Theater, renamed the IFC Center, an art house movie theater in Greenwich Village, New York City, New York, United States
- Waverly Bridge (disambiguation)
- Waverly Fairgrounds, home of the Elizabeth Resolutes of the National Association, baseball's first major league, in 1873
- Waverly (brand), a home fashion brand
- Waverly Films, a Brooklyn-based group of filmmakers, United States

== See also ==
- Waverley (disambiguation)
- Waverly Hall, Georgia, US
- New Waverly, Texas, US
- South Waverly, Pennsylvania, US
- Waverly Place, a street in Manhattan, New York City, New York, US
- Waverly Historic District (disambiguation)
- Waverly Village Hall (disambiguation)
