= U.S. Route 221 in Virginia =

Highway in Virginia

U.S. Route 221
- US 221 highlighted in red

Route information
- Auxiliary route of US 21
- Maintained by VDOT
- Length: 149.61 mi (240.77 km)

Major junctions
- South end: US 21 / US 221 near Independence
- US 21 / US 58 in Independence; SR 89 in Galax; I-77 near Hillsville; US 52 in Hillsville; US 58 in Hillsville; SR 8 in Floyd; Future I-73 / I-581 / US 220 in Roanoke; US 11 / US 460 in Roanoke; US 460 in Bedford; US 501 in Lynchburg
- North end: US 29 Bus. / US 460 Bus. / US 501 Bus. in Lynchburg

Location
- Country: United States
- State: Virginia
- Counties: Grayson, City of Galax, Carroll, Floyd, Roanoke, City of Roanoke, Botetourt, Bedford, City of Lynchburg

Highway system
- United States Numbered Highway System; List; Special; Divided; Virginia Routes; Interstate; US; Primary; Secondary; Byways; History; HOT lanes
← US 220	→ SR 222

U.S. Route 221 (US 221) is a part of the U.S. Highway System that runs from Perry, Florida to Lynchburg, Virginia. In Virginia, the U.S. Highway runs 149.61 miles (240.77 km) from the North Carolina state line near Independence north to its northern terminus at US 29 Business, US 460 Business, and US 501 Business in Lynchburg. US 221 connects Independence, Galax, and Hillsville in Southwest Virginia while running concurrently with US 58. The U.S. Highway connects those communities with Roanoke via Floyd County, within which US 221 is the main east–west highway. Entering Bedford County, US 221 exits the Blue Ridge Mountains; it then passes through the Piedmont town of Bedford on its way to Lynchburg and shares a brief overlap with US 460 Business through the town. The U.S. Highway also runs concurrently with US 460 from Roanoke to Bedford and parallels that U.S. Highway from Bedford to Lynchburg.

== Route description ==
=== Independence to Roanoke ===
US 221 enters Grayson County, Virginia from North Carolina concurrent with US 21. The U.S. Highways follow two-lane undivided New River Parkway, which crosses the New River a short distance north of the state line. US 221 and US 21 enter the town of Independence as Independence Avenue, which intersects US 58 (Main Street) in the center of town. US 21 continues north on Independence Avenue toward Wytheville while US 221 turns east onto Main Street. US 221 and US 58 exit the town as Grayson Parkway, which expands to a four-lane divided highway just west of its intersection with SR 274 (Riverside Drive). The U.S. Highways parallel the New River for a short distance before crossing the river at one of its bends. US 221 and US 58 pass to the north of the community of Baywood before meeting the southern end of SR 94 (Riverside Drive).

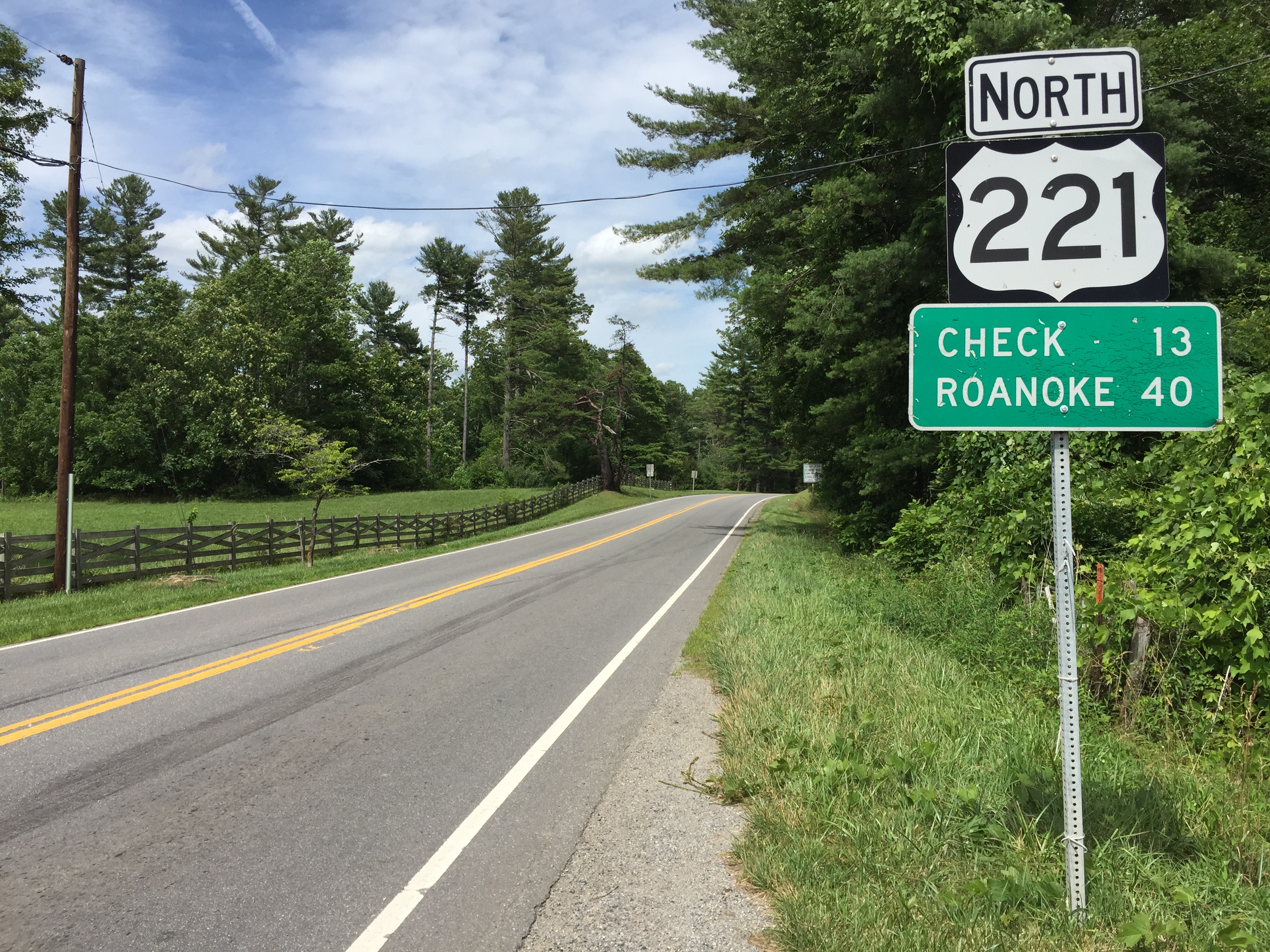
View north along US 221 at SR 615 just north of Floyd

East of SR 94, US 221 and US 58 enter the independent city of Galax. The highway is named Reserve Boulevard until just west of downtown, where the highway becomes an undivided highway named Stuart Drive and intersects SR 89 (Main Street). US 221 and US 58 pass the southern end of New River Trail State Park before crossing Chestnut Creek and becoming a five-lane road with a center left-turn lane. The U.S. Highways become a divided highway before entering Carroll County, where the highway is known as Carrollton Pike. US 221 and US 58 pass through Woodlawn before meeting I-77 at a diamond interchange. The U.S. Highways enter the town of Hillsville as Stuart Drive, a three-lane road with center turn lane. US 221 and US 58 intersect US 52 (Main Street) in the center of town before the highways diverge. US 58 continues east along Stuart Drive toward Martinsville while US 221 heads northeast on Floyd Pike, which meets the southern end of SR 100 (Sylvatus Smith Highway) just east of the town limits.

US 221 continues northeast into Floyd County, through which the highway passes as Floyd Highway. The U.S. Highway passes through Willis and Shelors Mill before becoming the Main Street of the county seat Floyd, where the highway intersects SR 8 (Locust Street). US 221 crosses the Little River and passes through Copper Hill before entering Roanoke County at Adney Gap. Just north of the county line, the U.S. Highway, now known as Bent Mountain Road, intersects a connector road to the Blue Ridge Parkway, which parallels the U.S. Highway on the western slope of Bent Mountain. North of the hamlet of Airpoint, US 221 descends the east–west section of Bent Mountain between Poor Mountain to the west and the spine of the Blue Ridge Mountains to the east. Once the highway is at the bottom of the mountain, it follows Back Creek into the Roanoke Valley.

=== City of Roanoke ===
Once in the valley, US 221 becomes Brambleton Avenue, a five-lane road with center turn lane. The highway passes through the suburb of Cave Spring, where the highway intersects SR 419 (Electric Road), before entering the city of Roanoke as a two-lane street. US 221 passes to the north of Virginia Western Community College before reaching Brandon Avenue, which the highway follows east a short distance before veering north onto Main Street. The U.S. Highway heads north through the Wasena neighborhood before crossing the Roanoke River and Norfolk Southern Railway's Altavista District. US 221 veers east on Elm Avenue through the Old Southwest neighborhood to Franklin Road. Southbound US 221 follows Franklin Road to the northeast while northbound US 221 continues on Elm Avenue to Jefferson Street, which carries SR 116 in both directions. There, US 221 turns north; Elm Avenue continues east as SR 24.

US 221 and SR 116 head north past the Patrick Henry Hotel to Franklin Road, where the highways turn east. After one block on Franklin Road, the highways turn north onto four-lane Williamson Road, on which they head north along the eastern side of Downtown Roanoke. US 221 and SR 116 are joined by US 11 at Campbell Avenue. The three highways expand to a divided highway and cross over Norfolk Southern's Blue Ridge District rail line between the Roanoke Shops to the east and the O. Winston Link Museum and Hotel Roanoke to the west. US 221, US 11, and SR 116 have a partial interchange with I-581 and US 220 east of the Gainsboro neighborhood; the interchange features ramps from northbound US 221 to northbound I-581 and from southbound I-581 to southbound US 221. The highways pass the Roanoke Civic Center before intersecting Orange Avenue in the middle of the Williamson Road neighborhood. Orange Avenue carries US 460 and U.S. Route 220 Alternate through the intersection, and U.S. Route 11 Alternate west of the intersection. US 11 continues north on Williamson Road, SR 116 turns west onto Orange Avenue, and US 221 turns east onto Orange Avenue.

=== Roanoke to Lynchburg ===
US 221, US 460, and US 220 Alternate head east as a six-lane divided highway that passes under Norfolk Southern Railway's Roanoke District and intersects SR 115 (Hollins Road). The road reduces to four lanes at Tinker Creek and becomes named Challenger Avenue on re-entering Roanoke County. US 220 Alternate turns north onto Cloverdale Road in the community of Bonsack just west of where US 221 and US 460 enter Botetourt County. The U.S. Highways continue as Blue Ridge Boulevard and meet the Blue Ridge Parkway at an interchange south of the community of Blue Ridge, where the highways parallel Norfolk Southern's Blue Ridge rail line through Buford's Gap to enter Bedford County. US 221 and US 460 continue east as the Lynchburg Salem Turnpike through the village of Thaxton to the town of Bedford.

Just inside the town limits, the two U.S. Highways diverge: US 460 continues along its bypass of Bedford while US 221 and US 460 Business head toward the downtown area along two-lane Blue Ridge Avenue. At the west edge of downtown, the highways continue on Main Street and intersect SR 122 Business (Crenshaw Street) at the Bedford Historic Meetinghouse. At Bridge Street, US 460 Business and southbound SR 43 continue east on Main Street while US 221, SR 122 Business, and northbound SR 43 turn north onto Bridge Street to cross the Blue Ridge District rail line. North of the railroad, SR 43 splits northwest on Peaks Street toward the Peaks of Otter. US 221 and SR 122 Business head northeast on Longwood Avenue to the business route's terminus at SR 122, which heads south on Independence Boulevard toward US 460 and north on a continuation of Longwood Avenue.

US 221 continues east on two-lane Forest Road, exiting the Bedford town limits, and then crossing the Little Otter River and the Otter River. After passing Goode, the U.S. Highway heads through Forest, the site of Saint Stephen's Episcopal Church and its Old Rectory and Thomas Jefferson's private retreat, Poplar Forest. At Forest, US 221 enters the suburban area surrounding Lynchburg and enters the independent city itself just west of its intersection with US 501 (Lynchburg Expressway). The U.S. Highway follows Lakeside Drive east past Lynchburg College to Oakley Avenue, onto which the U.S. Highway turns to pass through Lynchburg's West End. US 221 intersects SR 163 (Memorial Avenue) and joins US 460 Business on Fort Avenue next to Calvin Falwell Field. At Thurman Avenue, the two highways veer onto 12th Street and are joined by a second business route, US 501 Business, at Campbell Avenue. US 221, US 460 Business, and US 501 Business cross over Norfolk Southern's Danville District rail line and turn southeast onto Kemper Street a few blocks south of Lynchburg-Kemper Street Station, which is served by Amtrak. The three highways pass the Anne Spencer House before US 221 reaches its northern terminus at a cloverleaf interchange with US 29 Business (Lynchburg Expressway). Kemper Street continues southeast as US 460 Business and US 501 Business toward their termini at US 29, US 460, and US 501.

== Major intersections ==
County	Location	mi	km	Destinations	Notes
Grayson		0.00	0.00	US 21 south / US 221 south – Sparta	North Carolina state line; southern terminus of US 221 in Virginia
Grayson	Independence	3.86	6.21	US 21 north (Independence Avenue) / US 58 west (Main Street) – Wytheville, Mouth of Wilson	North end of concurrency with US 21; south end of concurrency with US 58
Grayson		6.61	10.64	SR 274 east (Riverside Drive) to SR 94 – Fries	
Grayson	Reavistown	15.29	24.61	SR 94 north (Riverside Drive) – Fries	
City of Galax		18.42	29.64	SR 89 south (Main Street)	
City of Galax				SR 89 Truck south (Meadow Street)	
Carroll		28.69	46.17	I-77 – Wytheville, Charlotte	I-77 exit 14
Carroll	Hillsville			US 58 east to US 52 – Martinsville, Danville	interchange; north end of US 58 overlap; south end of US 58 Bus. overlap
Carroll	Hillsville			US 52 (Main Street) – Fort Chiswell, Mount Airy	
Carroll	Hillsville	31.51	50.71	US 58 Bus. east (Stuart Drive) – Stuart	North end of concurrency with US 58 Bus.
Carroll	Hillsville	32.95	53.03	SR 100 north (Sylvatus Highway) / SR 669 (Hardscuffle Road) – Dublin	
Floyd				SR 787 (Indian Valley Road) – Indian Valley	former SR 102 north
Floyd	Willis			SR 799 (Conner Grove Road) – Meadows of Dan	former SR 102 south
Floyd	Floyd	59.09	95.10	SR 8 (Locust Street) – Christiansburg, Stuart	
Floyd				SR 860 (Shooting Creek Road) to Blue Ridge Parkway	former SR 109 east
Roanoke	Adney Gap	79.70	128.26	Blue Ridge Parkway	Connector road
Roanoke	Cave Spring	92.47	148.82	SR 419 (Electric Road) to US 220 – Salem	
City of Roanoke		97.15	156.35	US 220 Bus. south (Franklin Road) to Elm Avenue / SR 24	south end of US 220 Bus. overlap
City of Roanoke		97.45	156.83	SR 116 south (Jefferson Street)	south end of SR 116 overlap
City of Roanoke		97.73	157.28	US 11 south (Campbell Avenue)	South end of concurrency with US 11
City of Roanoke		98.03	157.76	Future I-73 north / I-581 north / US 220 north – Lexington, Salem	Northbound exit and southbound entrance; north end of US 220 Bus. overlap; exit 5 on I-581
City of Roanoke		98.53	158.57	US 11 north (Williamson Road) / US 11 Alt. south / US 460 west / SR 116 north (Orange Avenue / US 220 Alt. south) to I-581 / US 220	north end of concurrencies with US 11 and SR 116; south end of concurrencies with US 460 and US 220 Alternate
City of Roanoke		99.02	159.36	SR 115 north (Hollins Road)	
Roanoke	Bonsack	103.34	166.31	US 220 Alt. north (Cloverdale Road) to I-81 / US 11 – Troutville	North end of concurrency with US 220 Alternate
Botetourt		106.23	170.96	Blue Ridge Parkway	Interchange
Bedford	Bedford	124.46	200.30	US 460 Bus. east (US 221 Bus. north) to SR 43 – Bedford	interchange; no northbound entrance
Bedford	Bedford			SR 122 south / SR 122 Bus. north – Bedford, Airport	interchange; south end of SR 122 overlap
Bedford	Bedford			US 460 east to East Main Street / SR 714 – Lynchburg	interchange; north end of US 460 overlap; south end of US 460 Bus. overlap
Bedford	Bedford			US 460 Bus. west (East Main Street)	north end of US 460 Bus. overlap
Bedford	Bedford	127.18	204.68	US 221 Bus. south / SR 122 Bus. south (Longwood Avenue) / SR 122 north (Longwood Extension) – Big Island, Bedford	North end of concurrency with SR 122
Bedford	Forest			SR 811 (Thomas Jefferson Road) – Thomas Jefferson's Poplar Forest	former SR 127 south
Bedford	Forest			SR 1425 (Graves Mill Road)	former SR 126 east
City of Lynchburg		144.93	233.24	US 501 (Old Forest Road / Lynchburg Expressway) – Airport	former SR 291
City of Lynchburg				Old Forest Road	former SR 291 south
City of Lynchburg		148.11	238.36	SR 163 (Memorial Avenue)	
City of Lynchburg		148.35	238.75	US 460 Bus. west (Fort Avenue) to Wythe Road / US 29 Bus.	South end of concurrency with US 460 Business
City of Lynchburg		149.02	239.82	US 501 Bus. north (Campbell Avenue)	South end of concurrency with US 501 Business
City of Lynchburg		149.61	240.77	US 29 Bus. / US 460 Bus. east / US 501 Bus. south (Kemper Street) – Charlottesville, Danville	interchange; Lynchburg Expressway exit 3; northern terminus of US 221
1.000 mi = 1.609 km; 1.000 km = 0.621 mi: Concurrency terminus; Incomplete access

== Special routes ==
There is one business loop in Virginia.

U.S. Route 221
Previous state: North Carolina	Virginia	Next state: Terminus
