= Waverly, Virginia (disambiguation) =

Waverly, Virginia, is a town.

Waverly, Virginia may also refer to:

- Waverly, Caroline County, Virginia, an unincorporated community
- Waverly (Burnt Chimney, Virginia), a home and farm listed on the National Register of Historic Places
- Waverly (Leesburg, Virginia), a mansion listed on the National Register of Historic Places
- Waverly (Middleburg, Virginia), a historic house listed on the National Register of Historic Places
