= Spring Valley, Virginia =

Spring Valley may refer to:

- Spring Valley, Frederick County, Virginia
- Spring Valley, Grayson County, Virginia
- Spring Valley, Roanoke County, Virginia
- Spring Valley, Stafford County, Virginia
