= Virginia State Route 122 =

State highway in Virginia, United States

State Route 122

Route information
- Maintained by VDOT
- Length: 54.58 mi (87.84 km)
- Existed: July 1, 1933–present

Major junctions
- South end: SR 40 in Rocky Mount
- SR 116 at Burnt Chimney; SR 24 near Body Camp; US 460 / US 221 in Bedford
- North end: US 501 in Big Island

Location
- Country: United States
- State: Virginia
- Counties: Franklin, Bedford

Highway system
- Virginia Routes; Interstate; US; Primary; Secondary; Byways; History; HOT lanes
← SR 121	→ SR 123

State Route 122 (SR 122) is a primary state highway in the U.S. state of Virginia. The state highway runs 54.58 miles (87.84 km) from SR 40 in Rocky Mount north to U.S. Route 501 (US 501) in Big Island. SR 122 passes through the Blue Ridge foothills of Franklin and Bedford counties, connecting Rocky Mount with the town of Bedford. The state highway provides access to Booker T. Washington National Monument and Smith Mountain Lake, and the National D-Day Memorial via its Bedford business route.

== Route description ==
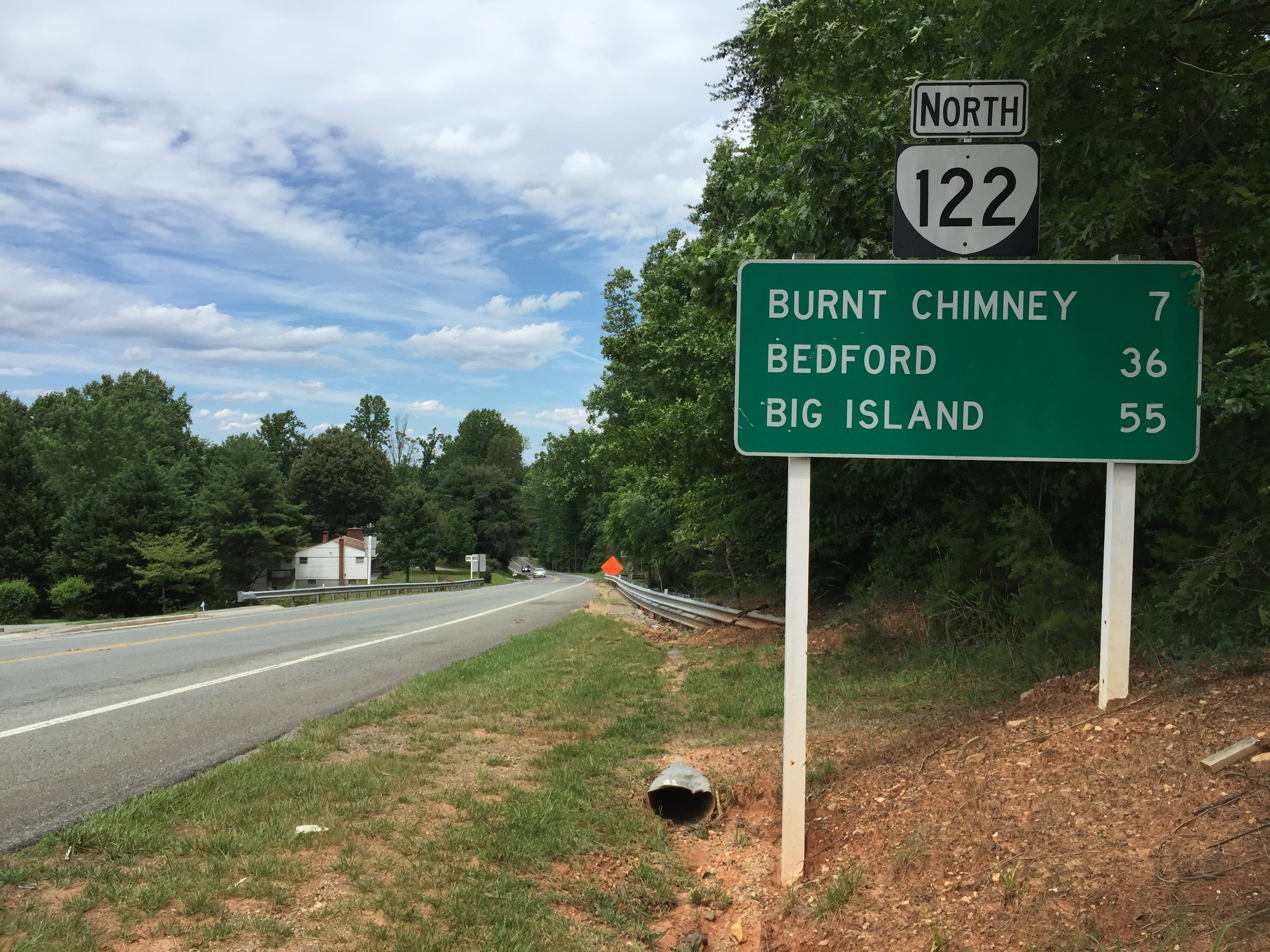
View north at the south end of SR 122 at SR 40 in Rocky Mount

SR 122 begins at an intersection with SR 40 (Old Franklin Turnpike) on the east side of the town of Rocky Mount, the county seat of Franklin County. The state highway heads northeast as two-lane undivided Booker T. Washington Highway. SR 122 crosses the Blackwater River, a tributary of the Roanoke River, and the former river's tributary, Maggodee Creek, before meeting the southern end of SR 116 (Jubal Early Highway) at Burnt Chimney. The state highway continues east by Booker T. Washington National Monument, which preserves the birthplace of Booker T. Washington. SR 122 passes through the community of Westlake Corner, a commercial center for the western side of Smith Mountain Lake, before crossing the lake and entering Bedford County. The state highway continues north as Moneta Road through the village of Moneta, where the highway crosses over Norfolk Southern Railway's Altavista District. SR 122 crosses Goose Creek and intersects SR 24 west of Body Camp; SR 24 heads west as Stewartsville Road toward Stewartsville and east as Shingle Block Road.

SR 122 continues north to the town of Bedford, where the highway's name changes to Burks Hill Road. At the highway's diamond interchange with the Bedford Bypass, the road continues toward downtown Bedford as SR 122 Business while SR 122 joins US 460 and US 221 on the four-lane freeway bypass. The three highways head east to a diamond interchange at the east end of the four-lane divided bypass. US 460 continues east as Lynchburg Salem Turnpike toward Lynchburg while SR 122, US 221, and US 460 Business follow Main Street west for one block. There, US 460 Business continues toward downtown Bedford while SR 122 and US 221 turn north onto two-lane undivided Independence Boulevard, an eastern bypass of Bedford that crosses over Norfolk Southern's Blue Ridge District rail line. SR 122 and US 221 diverge at the northern end of Independence Boulevard, where the highways meet the northern end of SR 122 Business (Longwood Avenue). US 221 heads east on Forest Road toward Forest while SR 122 heads north on Longwood Avenue out of the town of Bedford. SR 122 continues north as Big Island Highway through the hamlet of Centerville, which contains the historic home Otterburn, and over the Big Otter River. The state highway passes between Suck Mountain and Hurricane Mountain before reaching its northern terminus at US 501 (Lee Jackson Highway) just north of the village of Big Island on the James River.

== Major intersections ==
County	Location	mi	km	Destinations	Notes
Franklin	Rocky Mount	0.00	0.00	SR 40 (Old Franklin Turnpike) to US 220	Southern terminus
Franklin	Burnt Chimney	7.14	11.49	SR 116 north (Jubal Early Highway) – Roanoke	Southern terminus of SR 116
Bedford		26.09	41.99	SR 24 (Stewartsville Road / Shingle Block Road) – Roanoke, Evington	
Bedford	Bedford	33.88	54.52	US 221 south / US 460 west / SR 122 Bus. north – Roanoke, Bedford	Diamond interchange; south end of concurrency with US 221 and US 460
Bedford	Bedford	35.32	56.84	US 460 east to East Main Street / SR 714 – Lynchburg	Diamond interchange; north end of concurrency with US 460; south end of US 460 Bus. overlap
Bedford	Bedford			US 460 Bus. west (East Main Street)	north end of US 460 Bus. overlap
Bedford	Bedford	37.13	59.75	US 221 north (Forest Road) / US 221 Bus. south / SR 122 Bus. south (Longwood Avenue)	North end of concurrency with US 221
Bedford	Big Island	54.58	87.84	US 501 (Lee-Jackson Highway) – Natural Bridge, Lynchburg	Northern terminus
1.000 mi = 1.609 km; 1.000 km = 0.621 mi: Concurrency terminus

== Bedford business route ==
State Route 122 Business
- Location: Bedford
- Length: 2.60 mi (4.18 km)

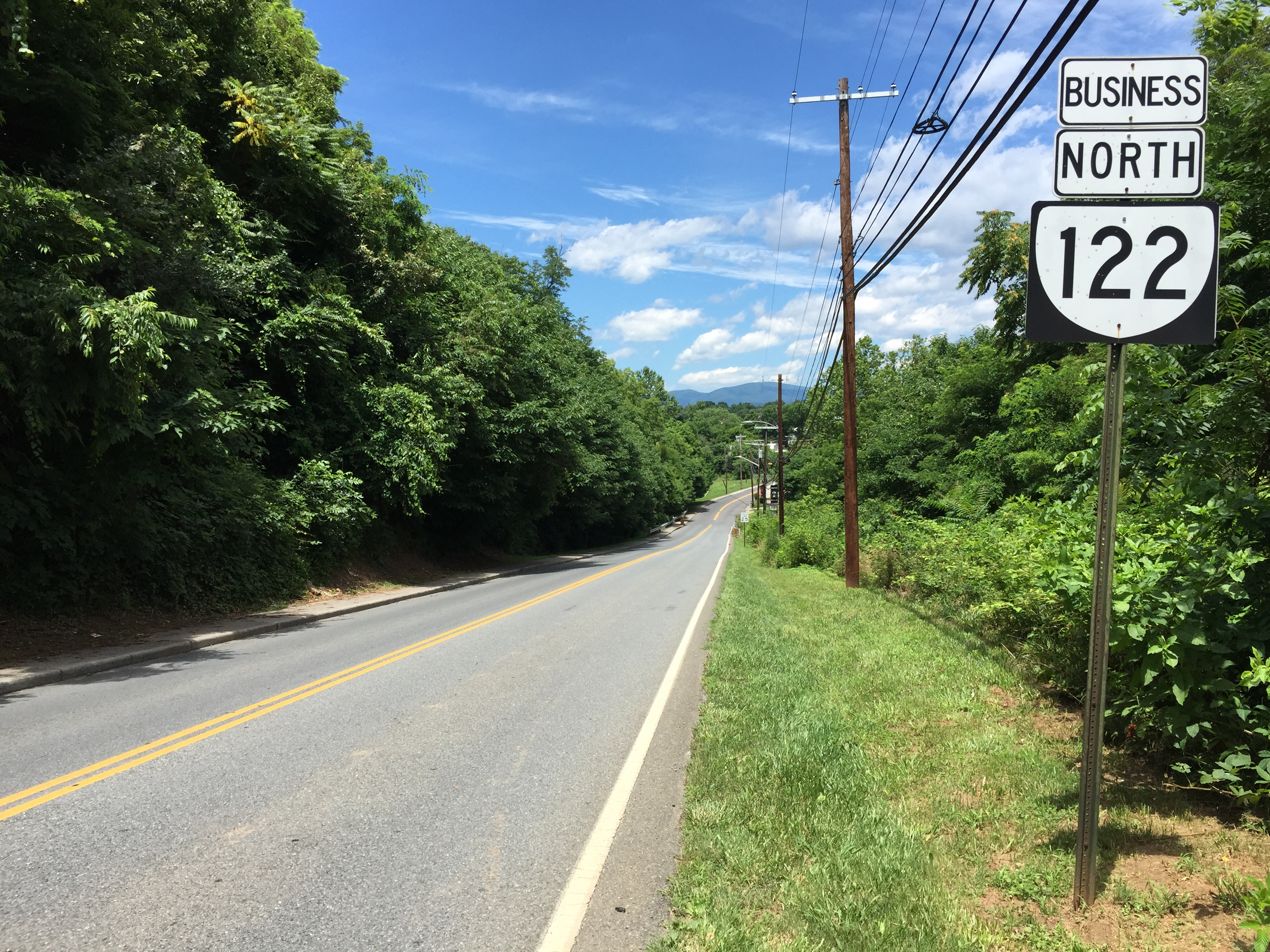
SR 122 Bus. in Bedford

Virginia State Route 122 Business (SR 122 Business) is a business route of SR 122 within the town of Bedford. The highway runs 2.60 miles (4.18 km) from SR 122, US 221, and US 460 on the south side of Bedford to SR 122 and US 221 on the north side of Bedford. SR 122 Business heads north from its diamond interchange with the Bedford Bypass as Burks Hill Road. Just north of the interchange, the highway passes the entrance to the Bedford Welcome Center and the National D-Day Memorial. At King Street, the highway's name changes to Crenshaw Street, which the business route follows to US 460 Business (Main Street). SR 122 turns east onto Main Street, which the highway follows for two blocks, passing the Bedford Historic Meetinghouse. The business route turns north onto Bridge Street, where the highway leaves its concurrency with US 460 Business and joins SR 43 to cross over Norfolk Southern Railway's Blue Ridge District. When SR 43 heads northwest as Peaks Street toward the Peaks of Otter, SR 122 Business heads northeast along Longwood Avenue to its northern terminus at US 221 (Forest Road) and SR 122, which heads south with US 221 on Independence Boulevard and north as Longwood Avenue.

< SR 334	Spurs of SR 33; 1923–1928	SR 336 >
< SR 203	District 2 State Routes; 1928–1933	SR 205 >
