= Virginia State Route 274 =

State highway in Grayson County, Virginia, US

State Route 274
- Riverside Drive

Route information
- Maintained by VDOT
- Length: 7.36 mi (11.84 km)
- Existed: c. 1980–present

Major junctions
- West end: US 58 / US 221 near Independence
- East end: SR 94 near Fries

Location
- Country: United States
- State: Virginia
- Counties: Grayson

Highway system
- Virginia Routes; Interstate; US; Primary; Secondary; Byways; History; HOT lanes
| ← SR 273 | → SR 276 |

State Route 274 (SR 274) is a primary state highway in the U.S. state of Virginia. Known as Riverside Drive, the state highway runs 7.36 miles (11.84 km) from U.S. Route 58 and US 221 near Independence east to SR 94 near Fries. Together with SR 94, SR 274 forms part of the old alignment of US 58 and US 221 between Independence and Galax in eastern Grayson County.

== Route description ==
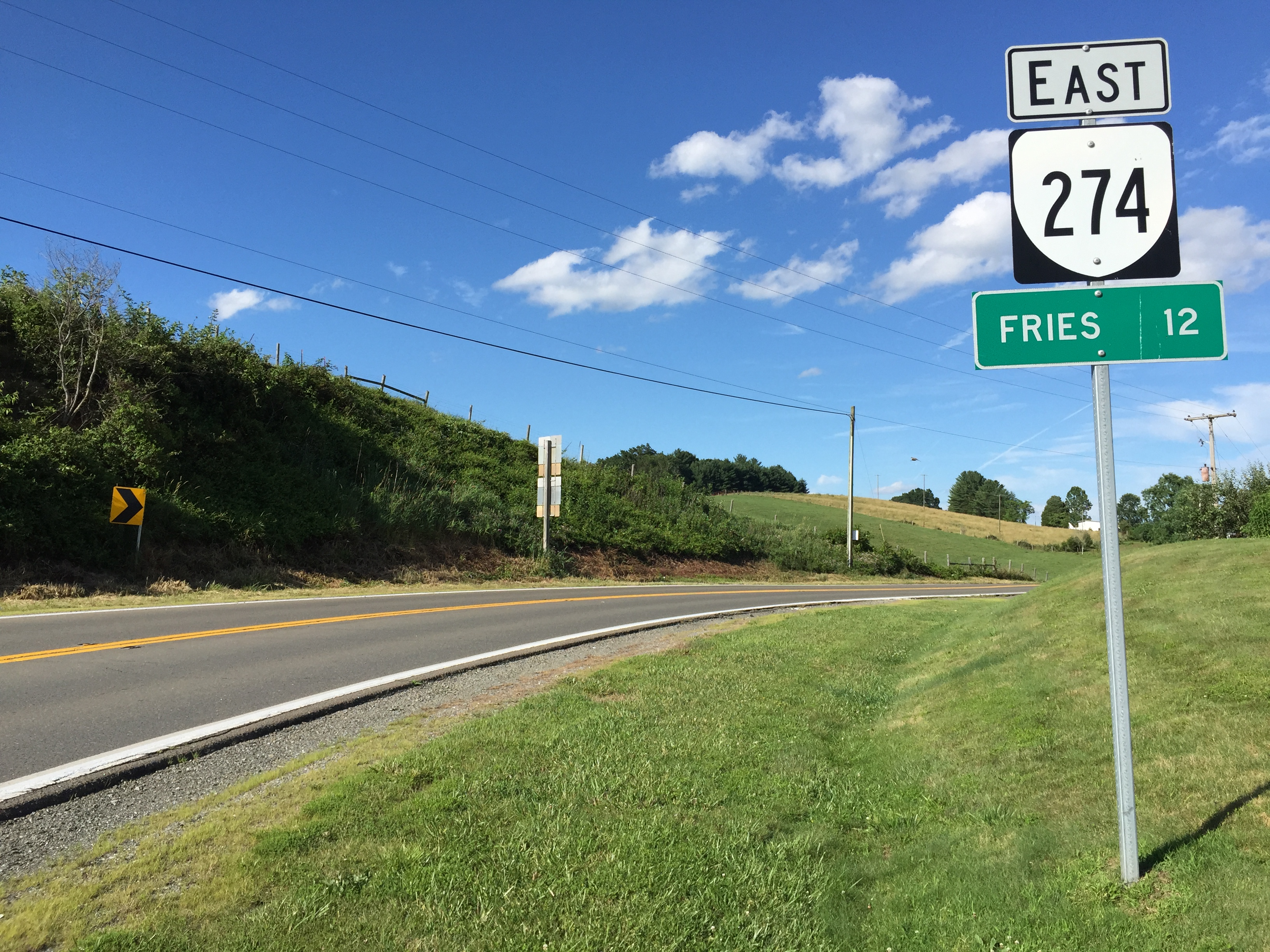
View east along SR 274 at US 58/US 221 near Independence

SR 274 begins at US 58 and US 221 (Grayson Parkway) a short distance east of the town of Independence. The state highway heads northeast as a two-lane undivided road and veers north on reaching the New River. SR 274 follows the river north and east along its left bank, once veering away from the river as it bends southeast. The state highway reaches its eastern terminus at SR 94, which heads north as Scenic Road toward Fries and east as a continuation of Riverside Drive.

== Major intersections ==
The entire route is in Grayson County.

| Location | mi | km | Destinations | Notes |
|---|---|---|---|---|
| | 0.00 | 0.00 | US 58 / US 221 (Grayson Parkway) – Galax, Independence | Western terminus |
| | 7.36 | 11.84 | SR 94 (Scenic Road / Riverside Drive) – Fries, Galax | Eastern terminus |
1.000 mi = 1.609 km; 1.000 km = 0.621 mi
