= Virginia State Route 58 =

The following highways in Virginia have been known as State Route 58:

- State Route 58 (Virginia 1930–1933), now Virginia State Route 94
- U.S. Route 58#Virginia, early 1930s – present
