= Waverly (given name) =

- Gender: Unisex

Origin
- Origin: English
- Meaning: “Meadow of quivering aspens”

Waverly is a given name, a transferred use of a surname and place name that likely meant “meadow filled with quivering aspens”. Modern parents might also associate the name with ocean waves because of the first syllable of the name.

== Popularity ==
Variant spellings Waverlee, Waverleigh, Waverley, and Waverlie are also in use. It is in use for both sexes but has recently gained in usage for girls in the United States. Waverly has been among the one thousand most popular names for girls in the United States since 2018.

== Men ==
- Waverly Alford III (born 1977), stage name King Gordy, a rapper from Detroit, Michigan
- Waverly Brown (1935–1981), American police officer killed in the line of duty
- Waverly D. Crenshaw Jr. (born 1956), United States district judge
- Waverly Jackson (born 1972), American former National Football League player
- Waverly Person (1926–2022), American seismologist
- Waverly Jack Slattery (1904–1983), American politician, elected to the California Senate in 1958
- Waverly Tillar (born 1952), American college football coach
- Waverly B. Woodson Jr. (1922–2005), American soldier and health professional
- Waverly W. Wray (1919–1944), American soldier

== Women ==
- Waverly Lowell, American archivist

== Fictional characters ==
- Waverly Earp, a female character from comic book and TV series Wynonna Earp
- Waverly Jong, a female character from The Joy Luck Club
- Waverly Boyle, one of the three rich Boyle sisters and ally to the antagonist of the 2012 French video game Dishonored.

== See also ==
- Waverly (disambiguation)
- Waverley (disambiguation)
