= Virginia State Route 94 =

State highway in western Virginia, US

State Route 94

Route information
- Maintained by VDOT
- Length: 28.39 mi (45.69 km)
- Existed: 1933–present

Major junctions
- South end: US 58 / US 221 near Galax
- SR 274 near Fries
- North end: US 52 in Fort Chiswell

Location
- Country: United States
- State: Virginia
- Counties: Grayson, Carroll, Wythe

Highway system
- Virginia Routes; Interstate; US; Primary; Secondary; Byways; History; HOT lanes
← SR 93	→ I-95

State Route 94 (SR 94) is a primary state highway in the U.S. state of Virginia. Known for much of its length as Ivanhoe Road, the state highway runs 28.39 miles (45.69 km) from U.S. Route 58 (US 58) and US 221 near Galax north to US 52 in Fort Chiswell. SR 94 connects Galax, Wytheville, and Independence (via SR 274) with the communities of Fries and Ivanhoe along the New River, which the highway parallels for much of its length.

== Route description ==
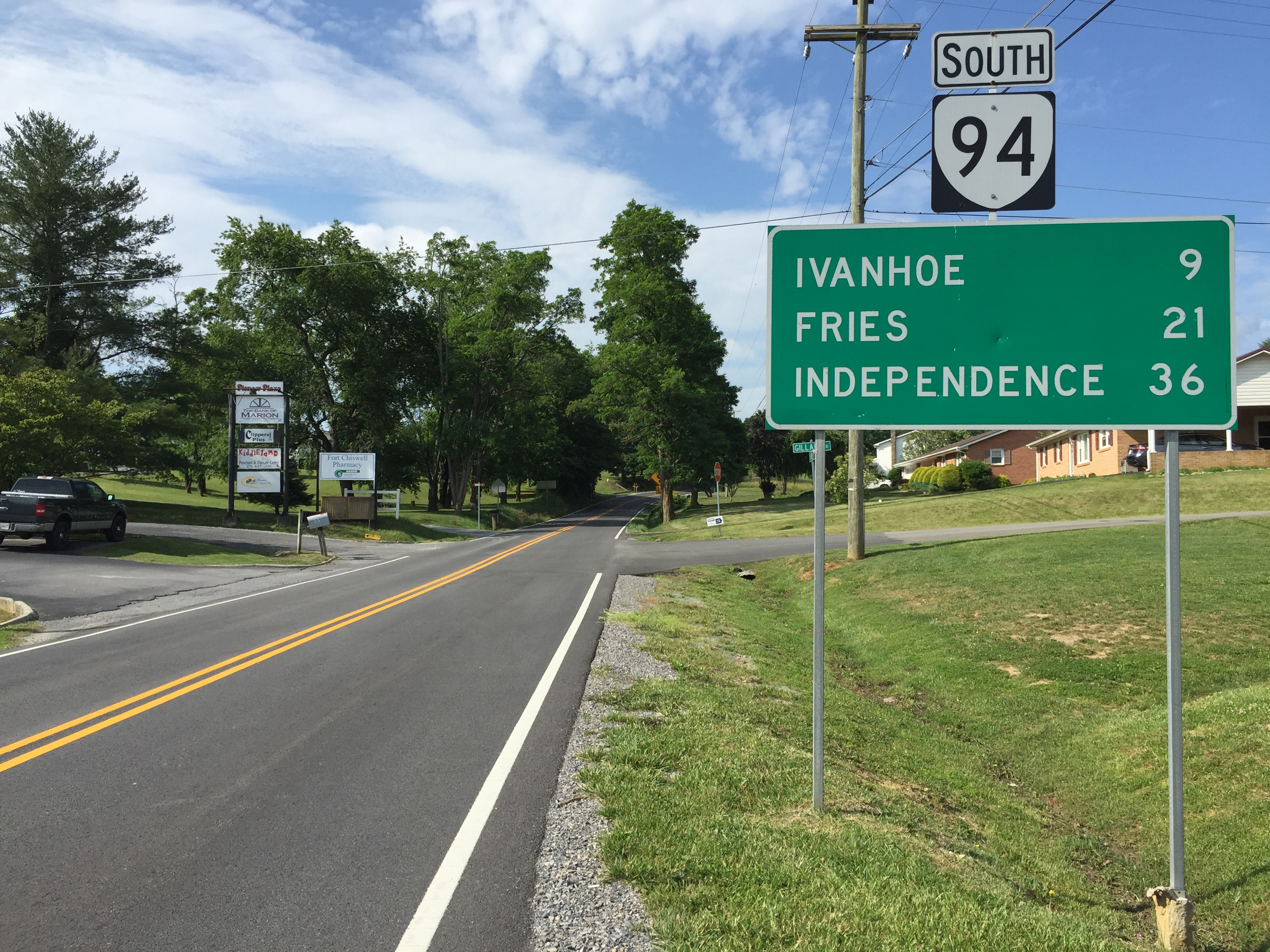
View south at the north end of SR 94 at US 52 in Fort Chiswell

SR 94 begins at an intersection with US 58 and US 221 (Grayson Parkway) in Grayson County west of Galax. The state highway heads northwest as Riverside Drive, which crosses the New River and parallels the river upstream to the highway's intersection with SR 274 (Riverside Drive). At that intersection, SR 94 turns north onto Scenic Road, which heads toward the town of Fries. The state highway parallels the New River, this time following it downstream, into the town limits to the west end of Main Street, where SR 94 makes a sharp turn northwest onto Ivanhoe Road. The state highway ascents out of the narrow river valley and enters Carroll County. SR 94 has a winding path that crosses Brush Creek and Little Brush Creek and passes to the west of Cold Ridge. The state highway straightens and approaches the New River again as it enters Wythe County, then curves northwest and passes through the village of Ivanhoe. SR 94 heads north out of Ivanhoe, crosses Cripple Creek, and runs straight between intersections with its old alignment, named Virginia 94 Old or Sheffey School Road. The state highway reaches its northern terminus at the east end of Lick Mountain at an intersection with US 52 (Fort Chiswell Road) in Fort Chiswell.

== Major intersections ==
County	Location	mi	km	Destinations	Notes
Grayson	Reavistown	0.00	0.00	US 58 / US 221 (Grayson Parkway) – Galax, Hillsville, Independence	Southern terminus
Grayson		4.22	6.79	SR 274 west (Riverside Drive) – Independence, Bristol	Eastern terminus of SR 274
Grayson	Providence			SR 805 (Spring Valley Road) to US 21	former SR 95 west
Grayson	Fries			SR 1001 (West Main Street)	
Carroll	No major junctions				
Wythe	Porters Crossroads			SR 619 (Huddle Road / Austinville Road) – Austinville	former planned SR 81
Wythe	Farmers Store	28.39	45.69	US 52 (Fort Chiswell Road) – Fort Chiswell, Wytheville, Hillsville	Northern terminus
1.000 mi = 1.609 km; 1.000 km = 0.621 mi

< SR 57	Two‑digit State Routes; 1923-1933	SR 59 >
< SR 120	Spurs of SR 12; 1923–1928	SR 122 >
