= Waverly Plantation =

Waverly Plantation may refer to:

- Waverly Plantation (Leon County, Florida)
- Waverly Plantation (Cunningham, North Carolina), on the National Register of Historic Places

== See also ==
- Waverly (house) (disambiguation)
