= Virginia State Route 116 =

State highway in southwestern Virginia, US

State Route 116

Route information
- Maintained by VDOT
- Length: 20.66 mi (33.25 km)
- Existed: July 1, 1933–present

Major junctions
- South end: SR 122 at Burnt Chimney
- US 221 / SR 24 in Roanoke; US 11 / US 221 / US 460 in Roanoke; Future I-73 / I-581 / US 220 in Roanoke
- North end: SR 101 in Roanoke

Location
- Country: United States
- State: Virginia
- Counties: Franklin, Roanoke, City of Roanoke

Highway system
- Virginia Routes; Interstate; US; Primary; Secondary; Byways; History; HOT lanes
← SR 115	→ SR 117

State Route 116 (SR 116) is a primary state highway in the U.S. state of Virginia. The state highway runs 20.66 miles (33.25 km) from SR 122 at Burnt Chimney north to SR 101 in Roanoke. SR 116 connects northwestern Franklin County with the southeastern part of Roanoke. The state highway forms a major street through Downtown Roanoke and the city's north side.

== Route description ==
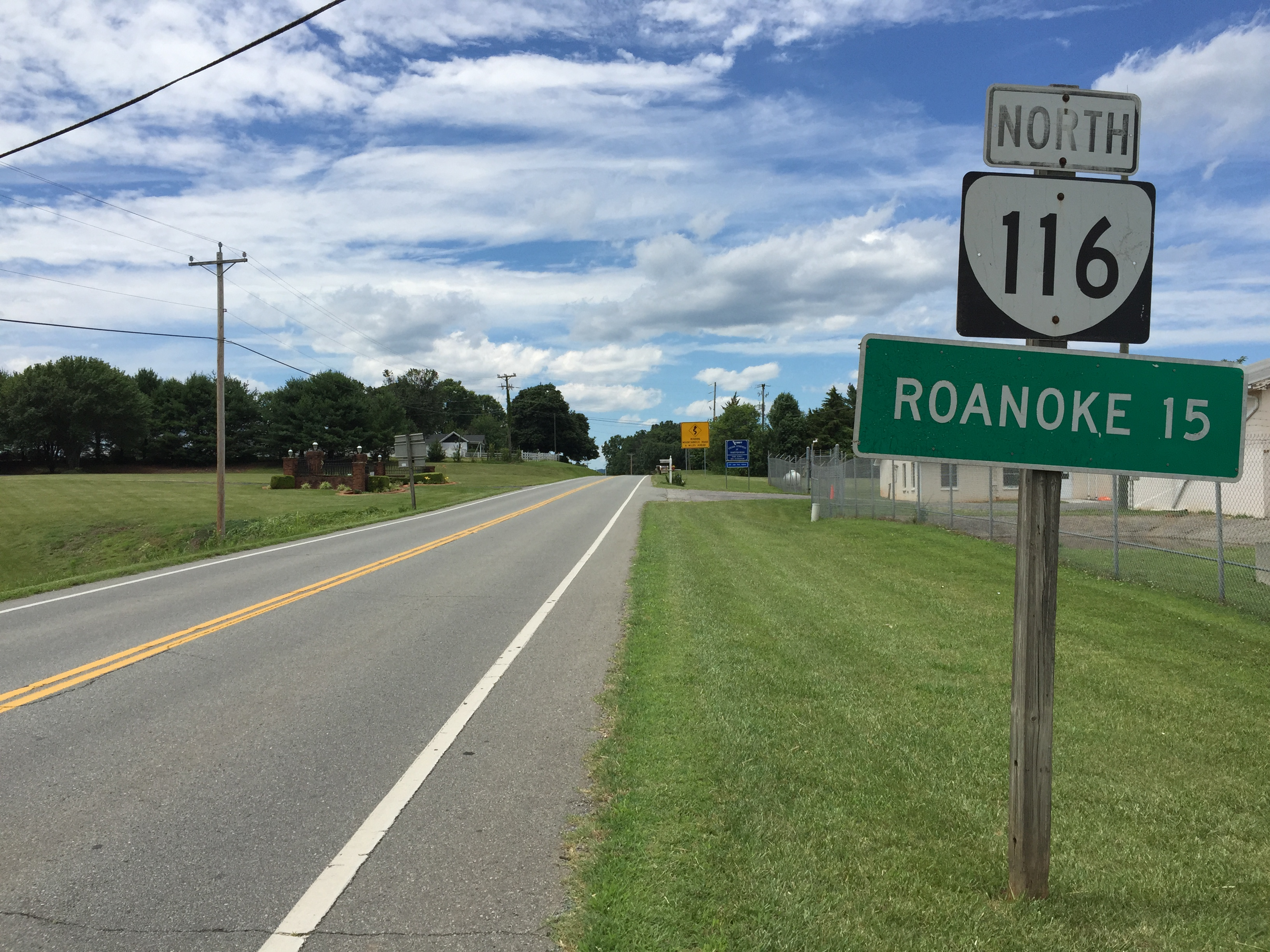
View north near the south end of SR 116 at SR 122 in Burnt Chimney

SR 116 begins at an intersection SR 122 (Booker T. Washington Highway) at the hamlet of Burnt Chimney. The state highway heads northwest as Jubal Early Highway, a two-lane undivided road that passes through northwestern Franklin County. After passing through the foothills, SR 116 has a short but steep and curvaceous crossing of the Blue Ridge Mountains. The state highway descends from the summit then has a short climb to Windy Gap, where the highway enters Roanoke County. SR 116 descends to Back Creek and continues northwest as Jae Valley Road, which passes under the Blue Ridge Parkway with no access. The state highway enters the city of Roanoke as Mount Pleasant Boulevard, then veers west as Riverland Road, which parallels the Roanoke River on the northeastern flank of Mill Mountain, down the slope from the Roanoke Star. SR 116 follows Riverland Road to Piedmont Street, onto which the highway turns south for one block to Walnut Street. The state highway uses a viaduct to cross the Roanoke River and the intersection of Norfolk Southern Railway's Winston-Salem and Altavista district rail lines just north of the historic Virginian Railway Passenger Station. Immediately after passing under U.S. Route 220 (US 220) (Roy L. Webber Expressway), SR 116 turns north onto four-lane Jefferson Street to pass through the Old Southwest neighborhood and by the Jefferson College of Health Sciences.

SR 116 reaches the southern edge of Downtown Roanoke at Elm Avenue, which heads west as US 221 and east as SR 24. SR 116 and US 221 continue north on Jefferson Street past the Patrick Henry Hotel to Franklin Road, where the highways turn east. After one block on Franklin Road, the highways turn north onto four-lane Williamson Road, on which they head north along the eastern side of Downtown Roanoke. SR 116 and US 221 are joined by US 11 at Campbell Avenue. The three highways expand to a divided highway and cross over Norfolk Southern's Blue Ridge District rail line between the Roanoke Shops to the east and the O. Winston Link Museum and Hotel Roanoke to the west. SR 116, US 221, and US 11 have a partial interchange with Interstate 581 (I-581) and US 220 east of the Gainsboro neighborhood; the interchange features ramps from northbound SR 116 to northbound I-581 and from southbound I-581 to southbound SR 116. The highways pass the Roanoke Civic Center before intersecting Orange Avenue in the middle of the Williamson Road neighborhood. Orange Avenue carries US 460 and U.S. Route 220 Alternate through the intersection, and U.S. Route 11 Alternate west of the intersection. US 11 continues north on Williamson Road, US 221 turns east onto Orange Avenue, and SR 116 turns west onto Orange Avenue.

SR 116, US 460, US 11 Alternate, and US 220 Alternate head west as a six-lane boulevard through a cloverleaf interchange with I-581 and US 220; US 220 Alternate has its southern terminus at the interchange. The other three highways continue west as a four-lane undivided street that passes along the southern edge of the Washington Park neighborhood. At 20th Street, the three highways veer southwest on Salem Turnpike, then west again on Melrose Avenue. The highways expand to a divided highway shortly before SR 116 leaves US 460 and US 11 Alternate by turning north onto two-lane undivided Lafayette Boulevard. At the northern end of Lafayette Boulevard, the state highway heads northwest on Cove Road. SR 116 reaches its northern terminus at an oblique intersection with SR 101 (Hershberger Road).

== Major intersections ==
County	Location	mi	km	Destinations	Notes
Franklin	Burnt Chimney	0.00	0.00	SR 122 (Booker T. Washington Highway) – Bedford, Rocky Mount, Smith Mountain Lake State Park, Booker T. Washington National Monument	Southern terminus
Roanoke	No major junctions				
City of Roanoke		15.58	25.07	SR 24 east (Elm Avenue) to I-581 north	Western terminus of SR 24
City of Roanoke				US 221 south / US 220 Bus. south (Franklin Road)	South end of US 221/US 220 Bus. overlap
City of Roanoke		15.86	25.52	US 11 south (Campbell Avenue)	South end of US 11 overlap
City of Roanoke		16.16	26.01	Future I-73 north / I-581 north / US 220 north – Lexington, Salem	Northbound exit and southbound entrance; north end of US 220 Bus. overlap; exit 5 on I-581
City of Roanoke		16.66	26.81	US 11 north (Williamson Road) / US 221 north / US 460 east / US 220 Alt. north (Orange Avenue) – Lynchburg	North end of US 11/US 221 overlap; south end of US 460/US 11 Alt./US 220 Alt. overlap
City of Roanoke		16.90	27.20	Future I-73 / I-581 / US 220 to I-81 – Downtown Roanoke, Roanoke Regional Airport	North end of US 220 Alt. overlap; exits 4E-W on I-581
City of Roanoke		19.41	31.24	US 11 Alt. south / US 460 west (Melrose Avenue)	North end of US 460/US 11 Alt. overlap
City of Roanoke		20.66	33.25	SR 101 (Hershberger Road) to I-581 (US 220) / Cove Road	Northern terminus
1.000 mi = 1.609 km; 1.000 km = 0.621 mi: Concurrency terminus; Incomplete access

< SR 205	District 2 State Routes; 1928–1933	SR 207 >
< SR 224	District 2 State Routes; 1928–1933	SR 226 >
