= Otterburn (Bedford, Virginia) =

Historic house in Virginia, United States

- U.S. National Register of Historic Places
- Virginia Landmarks Register
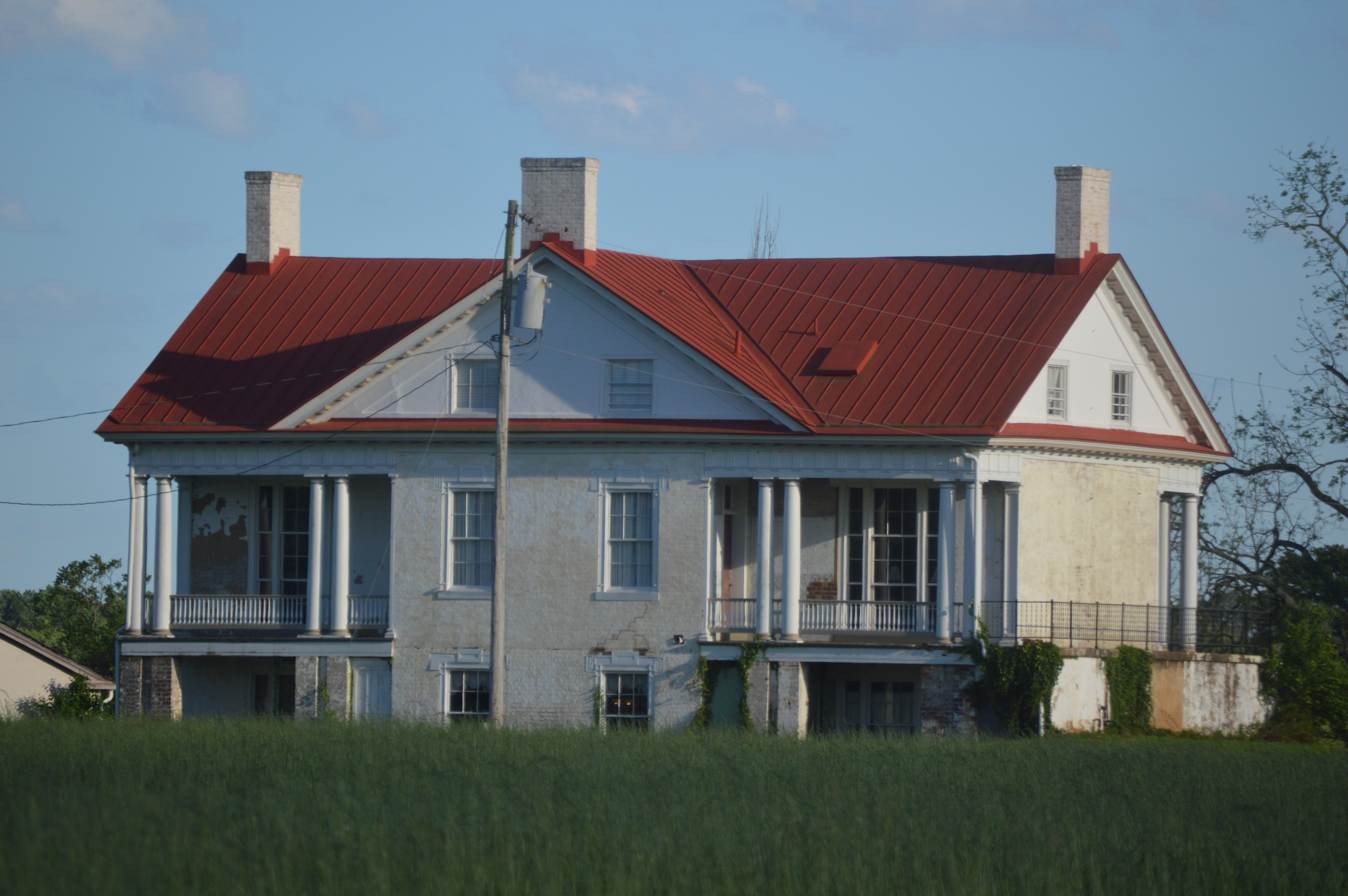
- Rear of the house

- Location within Virginia Location within the United States
- Location: Big Island Road, near Bedford, Virginia
- Coordinates: 37°22′5″N 79°29′50″W
- Built: 1843
- Architectural style: Classical Revival, Greek Revival
- NRHP reference No.: 01000146
- VLR No.: 009-0024

Significant dates
- Added to NRHP: February 16, 2001
- Designated VLR: December 6, 2000

Otterburn is a Palladian-influenced Greek Revival plantation house near Bedford in Bedford County, Virginia. The hilltop house was first built in 1828 for Benjamin A. McDonald (1797-1871) and his wife, the former Sally Camm of Lynchburg, and overlooks the Little Otter Creek watershed. Benjamin A. McDonald, a prominent local Whig educated in Scotland, was appointed a local justice of the peace in 1832 and won election as Bedford County's first presiding justice in 1852. Re-elected twice, he served in the county's highest office from 1852 through 1864. His associated plantation in 1825 was 1,651-acre (668 ha), and included a gristmill, sawmill and dependent structures, mostly operated by enslaved labor (more than 20 slaves in the 1820s and 1830s, more than 30 slaves in 1840). At its largest, the associated plantation encompassed about 2,800-acre (1,100 ha) acres, but in modern times includes fewer than 16-acre (6.5 ha) acres. Fire gutted the original house in 1841, and it was reconstructed in the Greek Revival style by 1843, with an unusual transverse hall plan, facade that makes the 2 1/2-story structure look only 1 1/2 stories, and the addition of a loggia, cross-gable roof with a wrought iron balustrade and Greek Revival detailing. The surviving wash house also dates to this mid-19th-century era. During the Civil War, Union soldiers reportedly confiscated flour barrels from the house, and damaged interior stairwell railings when rolling them out. After McDonald died in 1871, since his only child, a daughter, did not survive infancy, the property passed through several owners until 1950, when the house became the Hines Memorial Pythian Home, an orphanage operated by the Knights of Pythias. A detached dormitory added at this time remains but lacks historic significance. The orphanage closed in the early 1960s. For two years in the late 1960s the Otterburn Academy used the premises, as a private school formed during Virginia's Massive Resistance to desegregation. The property later became a rest home for the elderly. The house is being restored.
