= Virginia State Route 115 =

State highway in southwestern Virginia, US

State Route 115

Route information
- Maintained by VDOT
- Length: 6.00 mi (9.66 km)
- Existed: 1933–present

Major junctions
- South end: US 221 / US 460 / US 220 Alt. in Roanoke
- US 11 in Hollins
- North end: I-81 / US 220 / SR 815 near Hollins

Location
- Country: United States
- State: Virginia
- Counties: City of Roanoke, Roanoke

Highway system
- Virginia Routes; Interstate; US; Primary; Secondary; Byways; History; HOT lanes
← SR 114	→ SR 116

State Route 115 (SR 115) is a primary state highway in the U.S. state of Virginia. Known for most of its length as Plantation Road, the state highway runs 6.00 miles (9.66 km) from U.S. Route 221 (US 221), US 460, and US 220 Alternate in Roanoke north to Interstate 81 (I-81) and US 220 near Hollins.

== Route description ==
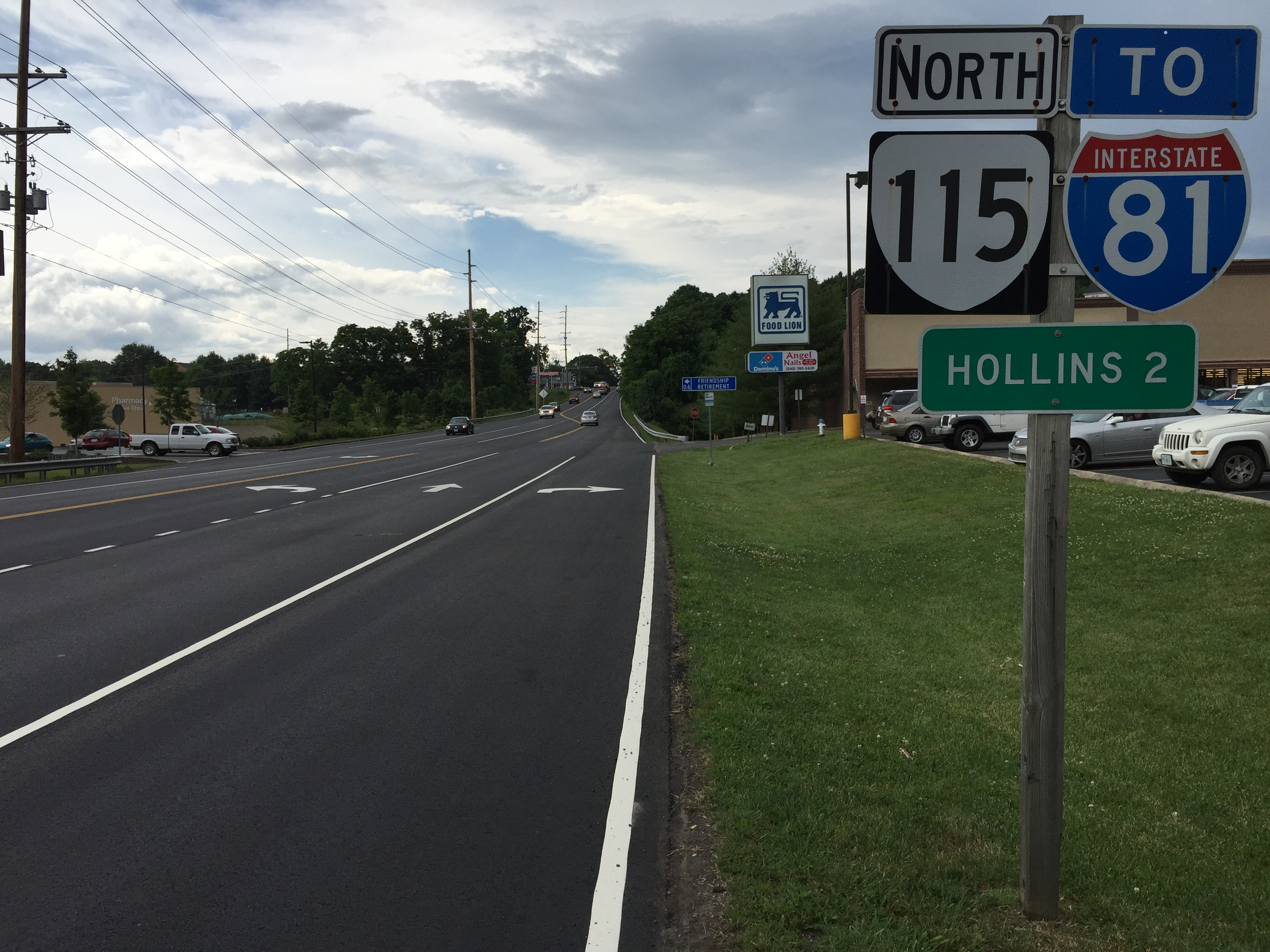
View north along SR 115 at SR 601 in Hollins

SR 115 begins at an intersection with Orange Avenue, which carries US 221, US 460, and US 220 Alternate, in the northeastern part of the city of Roanoke. The state highway heads north as two-lane undivided Hollins Road between an industrial area that lines Norfolk Southern Railway's Roanoke District to the west and a residential area to the east. SR 115 turns west onto Liberty Road to pass under the railroad, then turns north onto Plantation Road. The state highway leaves the city of Roanoke and enters Roanoke County by crossing Carvin Creek, a tributary of Tinker Creek, south of its intersection with SR 625 (Hershberger Road), which becomes SR 101 to the west. SR 115 continues through the community of Hollins, where the highway intersects US 11 (Lee Highway). The state highway expands to a five-lane road with a center left-turn lane and passes through an industrial area on its way to its northern terminus at a diamond interchange with I-81 and US 220. Immediately north of the interchange, Plantation Road continues as SR 815, which turns east to parallel the Interstate before turning north to its end at the dam that impounds Carvin Creek to form Carvin Cove Reservoir just north of the Roanoke–Botetourt county line.

== Major intersections ==
County	Location	mi	km	Destinations	Notes
City of Roanoke		0.00	0.00	US 221 / US 460 (Orange Avenue / US 220 Alt.- Lynchburg, I-581/ U.S 220, Roanoke, Airport, Cave Spring, Martinsville)	Southern terminus
Roanoke	Hollins			SR 601 (Hollins Road) / SR 743 (John Richardson Road)	former SR 115 north
Roanoke	Hollins	5.05	8.13	US 11 (Williamson Road) to US 220 – Roanoke, Hollins, Cloverdale	
Roanoke	Hollins	6.00	9.66	I-81 / US 220 / SR 815 (Angel Lane) – Roanoke, Salem, Bristol, Lexington, Covington, Winchester	I-81 exit 146; northern terminus
1.000 mi = 1.609 km; 1.000 km = 0.621 mi

< SR 225	District 2 State Routes; 1928–1933	SR 227 >
