= Waverly Historic District =

Waverly Historic District or Waverley Historic District may refer to:

- Waverley Historic District (Enid, Oklahoma), listed on the National Register of Historic Places (NRHP)
- Waverly Historic District (Waverly Township, Pennsylvania), listed on the NRHP
- Waverly Historic District (Columbia, South Carolina), listed on the NRHP

== See also ==
- Waverly (disambiguation)
- Waverley (disambiguation)
