= Brookside Farm and Mill =

- U.S. National Register of Historic Places
- Virginia Landmarks Register
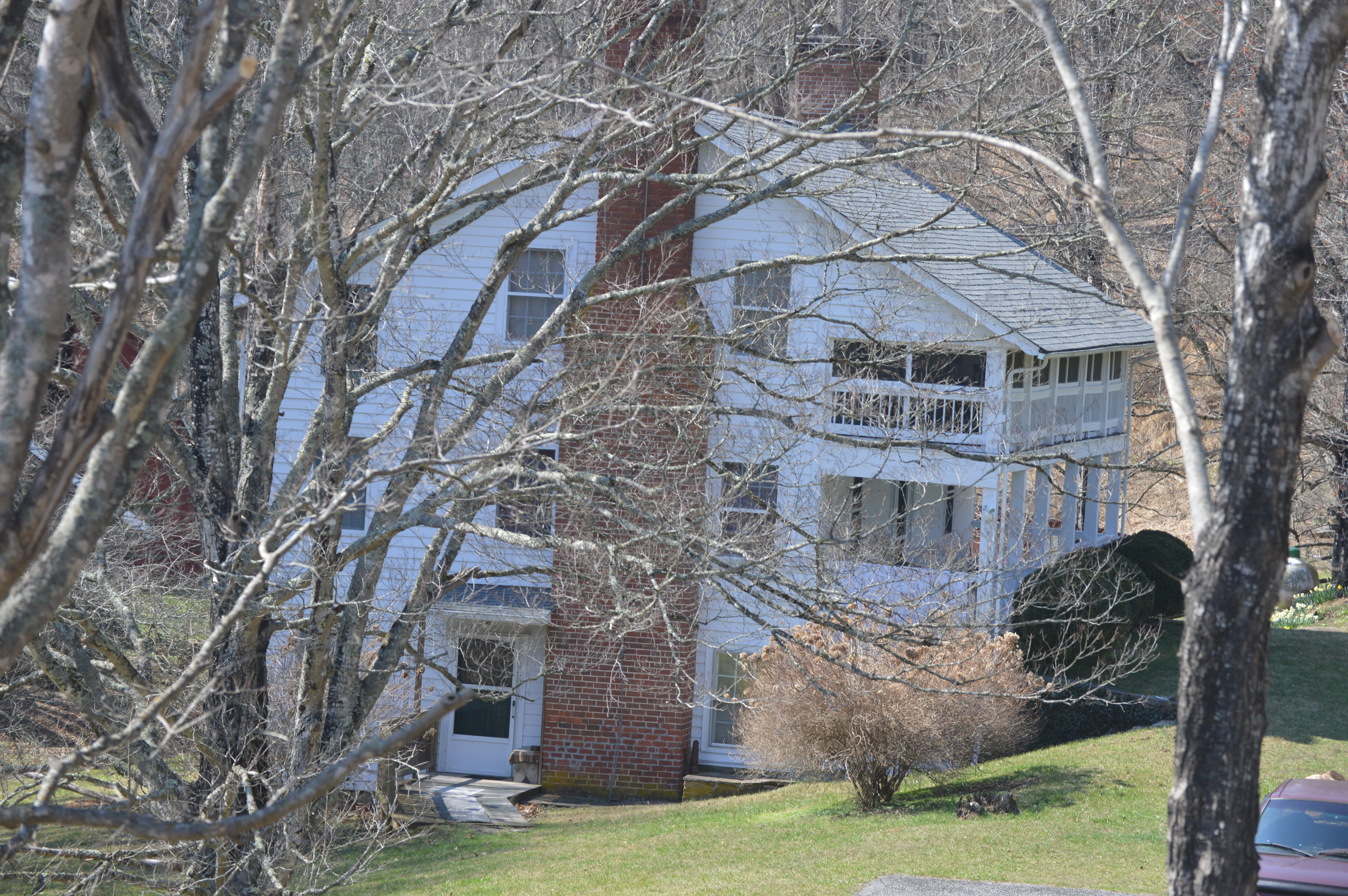
- Roadside view of the main house

- Location within Virginia Location within the United States
- Location: 4161 Wilson Highway, Independence, Virginia
- Coordinates: 36°37′06″N 81°13′31″W
- Area: 447 acres (181 ha)
- Built: 1876
- Built by: Robert Landreth, Samuel M. Fulton, et al.
- NRHP reference No.: 05001272
- VLR No.: 038-0009

Significant dates
- Added to NRHP: November 16, 2005
- Designated VLR: September 14, 2005

Brookside Farm and Mill is a historic grist mill and farm complex located at Independence, Grayson County, Virginia. The Brookside Mill was built in 1876, and is a three-story, three-bay by three bay, heavy timber frame building measuring 30 feet by 35 feet. The principal dwelling was built in 1877, and is a two-story, three-bay, frame building with a central passage plan. Other contributing buildings and structures include a brick spring house, brick smokehouse, log corn crib, frame hen house (c. 1910-1912), miller's cabin (c. 1880), the miller's cottage or Graham House (c. 1900), a frame service station / garage (1918), and concrete dam (1914) and earthen mill race.

It was listed on the National Register of Historic Places in 2005.
