= Grayson County Courthouse (Virginia) =

Historic courthouse in Virginia, US

- U.S. National Register of Historic Places
- Virginia Landmarks Register
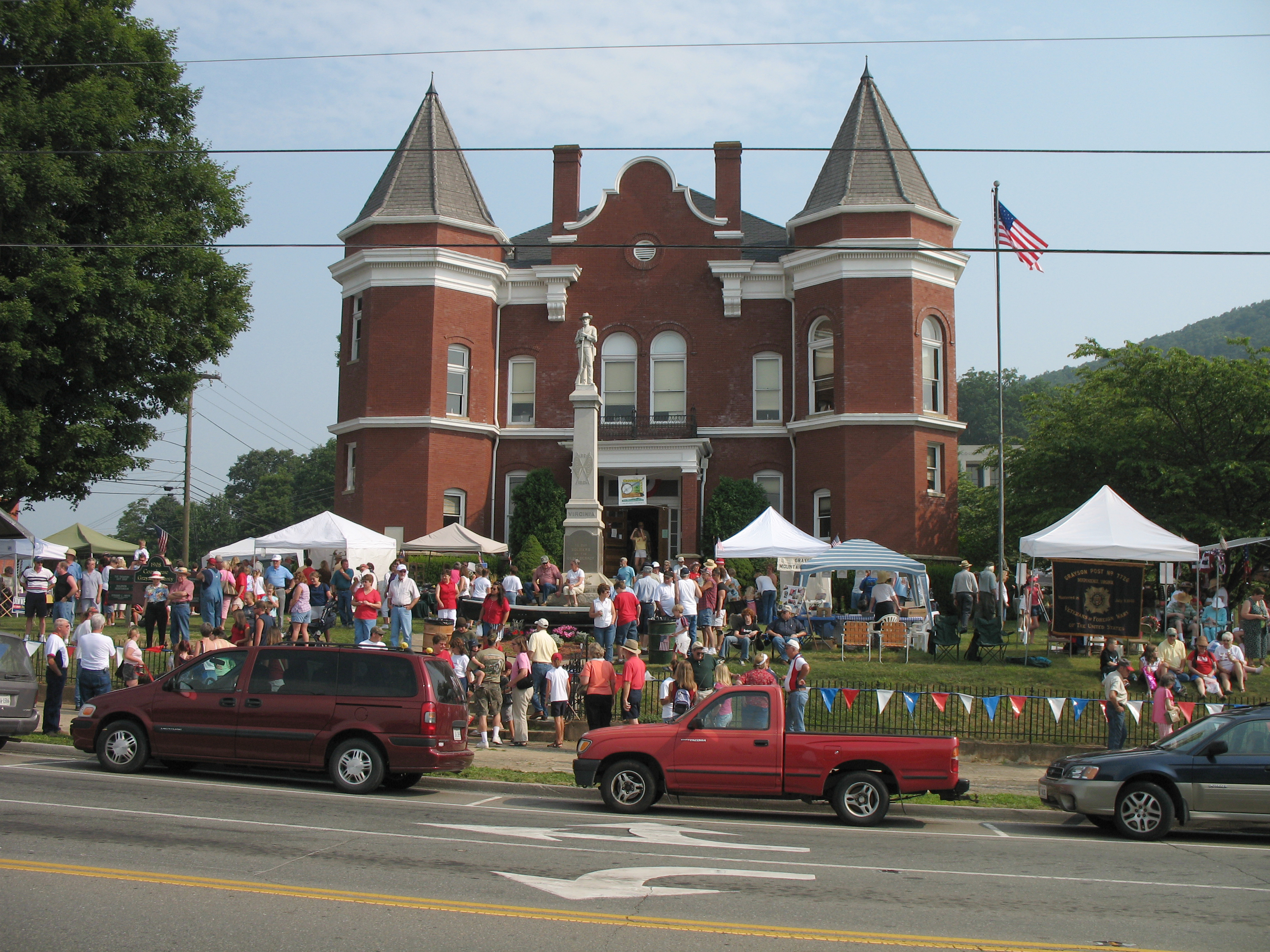
- Grayson County Courthouse and parade

- Location within Virginia Location within the United States
- Location: Main St., Independence, Virginia
- Coordinates: 36°37′21″N 81°9′7″W
- Area: 1 acre (0.40 ha)
- Built: 1908
- Built by: Robbins, E.L.
- Architect: Milburn, Frank P.,& Co.
- NRHP reference No.: 78003019
- VLR No.: 240-0001

Significant dates
- Added to NRHP: January 26, 1978
- Designated VLR: June 21, 1977

The Grayson County Courthouse is a historic county courthouse located at Independence, Grayson County, Virginia. It was built in 1908 to replace an 1850 building. Designed by architect Frank Pierce Milburn and built by E.L. Robbins of Grassy Creek, Virginia, the eclectic brick building employs a Flemish gable flanked by turrets.

It was listed on the National Register of Historic Places in 1978.

== Historic 1908 Courthouse ==
In 1979 the county opened a new courthouse. The 1908 building now serves as an area art and cultural center that is operated by the Historic 1908 Courthouse Foundation, and houses the Grayson Crossroads Museum, Baldwin Auditorium, Treasury Gift Shop, and offices housing businesses and other non-profit organizations.

The Grayson Crossroads Museum is a museum of local history, with photos, pioneer and household artifacts.

The Baldwin Auditorium seats over 200 people and is located in the former courtroom space. The multi-purpose space is available for rental.
