= Waverly Bridge =

Waverly Bridge may refer to:

- Waverly Bridge (Mississippi), spans Tombigbee River in Lowndes and Clay counties, Mississippi, listed on the NRHP in Lowndes County
- Waverly Bridge (Missouri)
