= Waverly Tillar =

American football coach (born c. 1952)

Biographical details
- Born: c. 1952 (age 73–74); Richmond, Virginia, U.S.
- Education: Virginia Union University (1994)

Playing career
- 1970–1973: Virginia Union
- Position: Linebacker

Coaching career (HC unless noted)
- 1974–1981: Virginia Union (assistant)
- 1982–1985: Virginia Union (ST/DB)
- 1986–1994: Virginia Union (ST/LB)
- 1995–1999: Virginia State (LB/DB)
- 2000–2001: Elizabeth City State (ST/LB)
- 2002: Elizabeth City State (DC)
- 2003–2015: Elizabeth City State

Head coaching record
- Overall: 69–68
- Bowls: 1–1
- Tournaments: 0–2 (NCAA D-II playoffs)

Accomplishments and honors

Championships
- 3 CIAA Eastern Division (2006, 2008–2009); 2 CIAA Northern Division (2011–2012)

Awards
- 2× CIAA Coach of the Year (2006, 2008)

Waverly Tillar (born c. 1952) is an American college football coach. He was the head football coach for Elizabeth City State University from 2003 to 2015.

== Career ==
Tillar played college football for Virginia Union as a linebacker. After his graduation, he served as an assistant for the team until 1994. During his tenure he coached the special teams, defensive backs, and linebackers. In 1995, he was hired as the linebackers coach and defensive backs coach for Virginia State.

In 2000, Tillar was hired as the special teams coordinator and linebackers coach for Elizabeth City State. In 2002, he was promoted to defensive coordinator. In 2003, he was promoted once again, this time to head football coach. In thirteen seasons as head coach he led the team to a 69–68 record including two trips to the NCAA Division II playoffs. In 2008, he led the Vikings to the Pioneer Bowl, which they lost, before making, and winning, it in 2012. From 2006 to 2012 he led the team to five Central Intercollegiate Athletic Association division titles. His best season came in 2006 when he led the team to a 9–3 record, a trip to the NCAA Division II playoffs, and a final ranking of 21 in the AFCA poll. He was also named CIAA Coach of the Year. He was fired following the 2015 season.

== Head coaching record ==
Year	Team	Overall	Conference	Standing	Bowl/playoffs	AFCA^{#}
Elizabeth City State Vikings (Central Intercollegiate Athletic Association) (2003–2015)
2003	Elizabeth City State	2–8	2–5	5th (Eastern)		
2004	Elizabeth City State	3–7	2–5	5th (Eastern)		
2005	Elizabeth City State	2–8	1–6	6th (Eastern)		
2006	Elizabeth City State	9–3	7–0	1st (Eastern)	L NCAA Division II First Round	21
2007	Elizabeth City State	5–5	5–2	2nd (Eastern)		
2008	Elizabeth City State	7–4	7–0	1st (Eastern)		
2009	Elizabeth City State	7–4	5–2	T–1st (Eastern)	L Pioneer	
2010	Elizabeth City State	6–4	5–2	3rd (Northern)		
2011	Elizabeth City State	8–4	6–1	1st (Northern)	L NCAA Division II First Round	
2012	Elizabeth City State	8–4	6–1	1st (Northern)	W Pioneer	
2013	Elizabeth City State	4–6	4–3	2nd (Northern)		
2014	Elizabeth City State	4–6	3–4	4th (Northern)		
2015	Elizabeth City State	4–5	2–5	5th (Northern)		
Elizabeth City State:		69–68	55–36			
Total:		69–68				
National championship Conference title Conference division title or championship game berth
