= Fries Boarding Houses =

Historic residential buildings in Virginia, United States

- U.S. National Register of Historic Places
- Virginia Landmarks Register
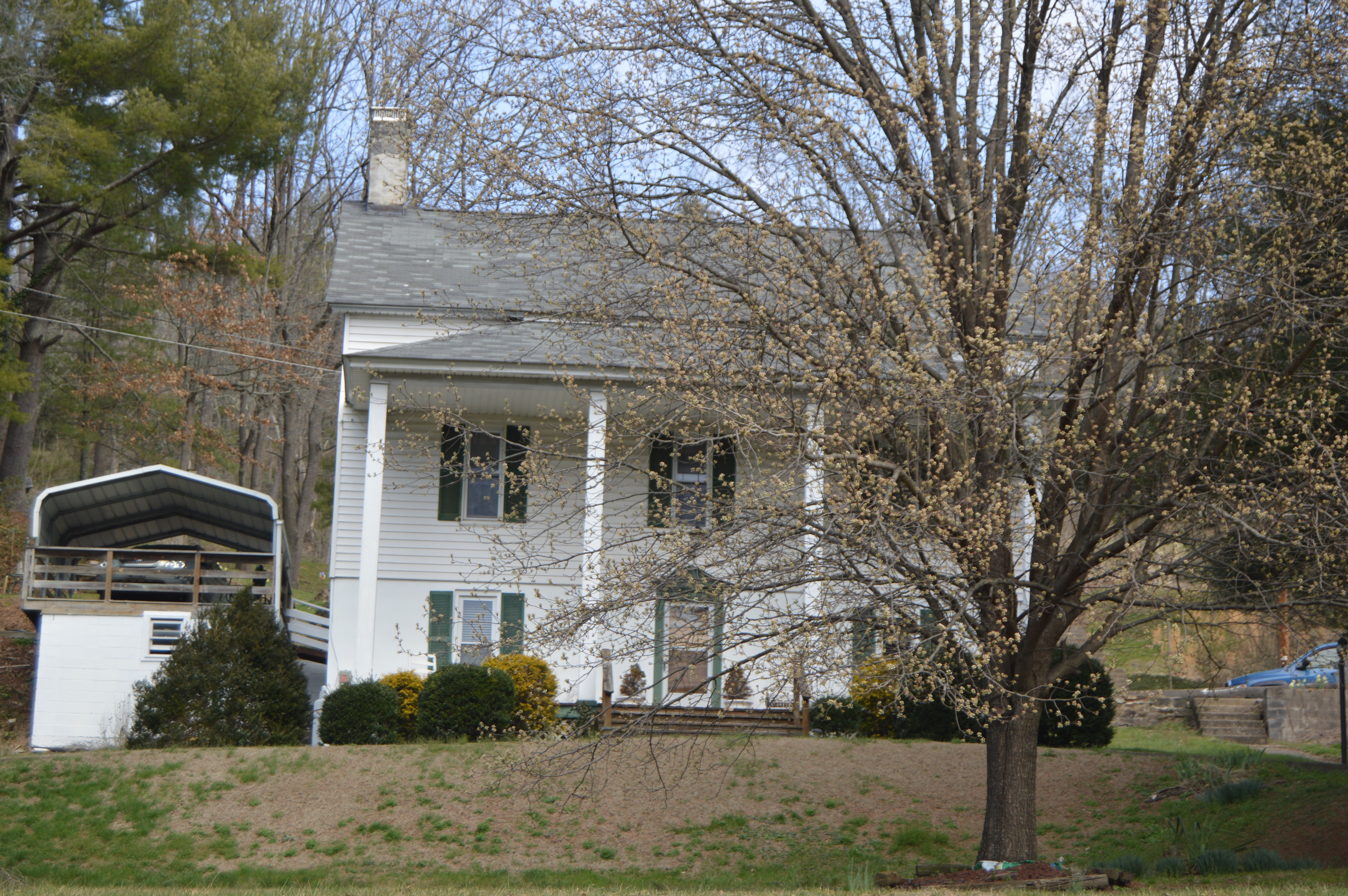
- Southern side of 364 Grayson

- Location within Virginia Location within the United States
- Location: 362 and 364 Grayson St., Fries, Virginia
- Coordinates: 36°43′1″N 80°58′43″W
- Area: Less than 1 acre (0.40 ha)
- Architectural style: Colonial Revival
- NRHP reference No.: 07001139
- VLR No.: 220-5015

Significant dates
- Added to NRHP: October 29, 2007
- Designated VLR: September 5, 2007

Fries Boarding Houses are two historic boarding houses located at Fries, Grayson County, Virginia. They were built as twins, and are large two-story frame buildings resting on full-height stuccoed brick basements in the Colonial Revival style. They have side-gable roofs, brick interior end chimneys, and gabled dormers. The exact date of the boarding houses is unknown, but they likely date to the first phase of village construction between 1901 and 1910.

They were listed on the National Register of Historic Places in 2007.
