= Spring Valley Rural Historic District =

Historic district in Virginia, United States

- U.S. National Register of Historic Places
- U.S. Historic district
- Virginia Landmarks Register
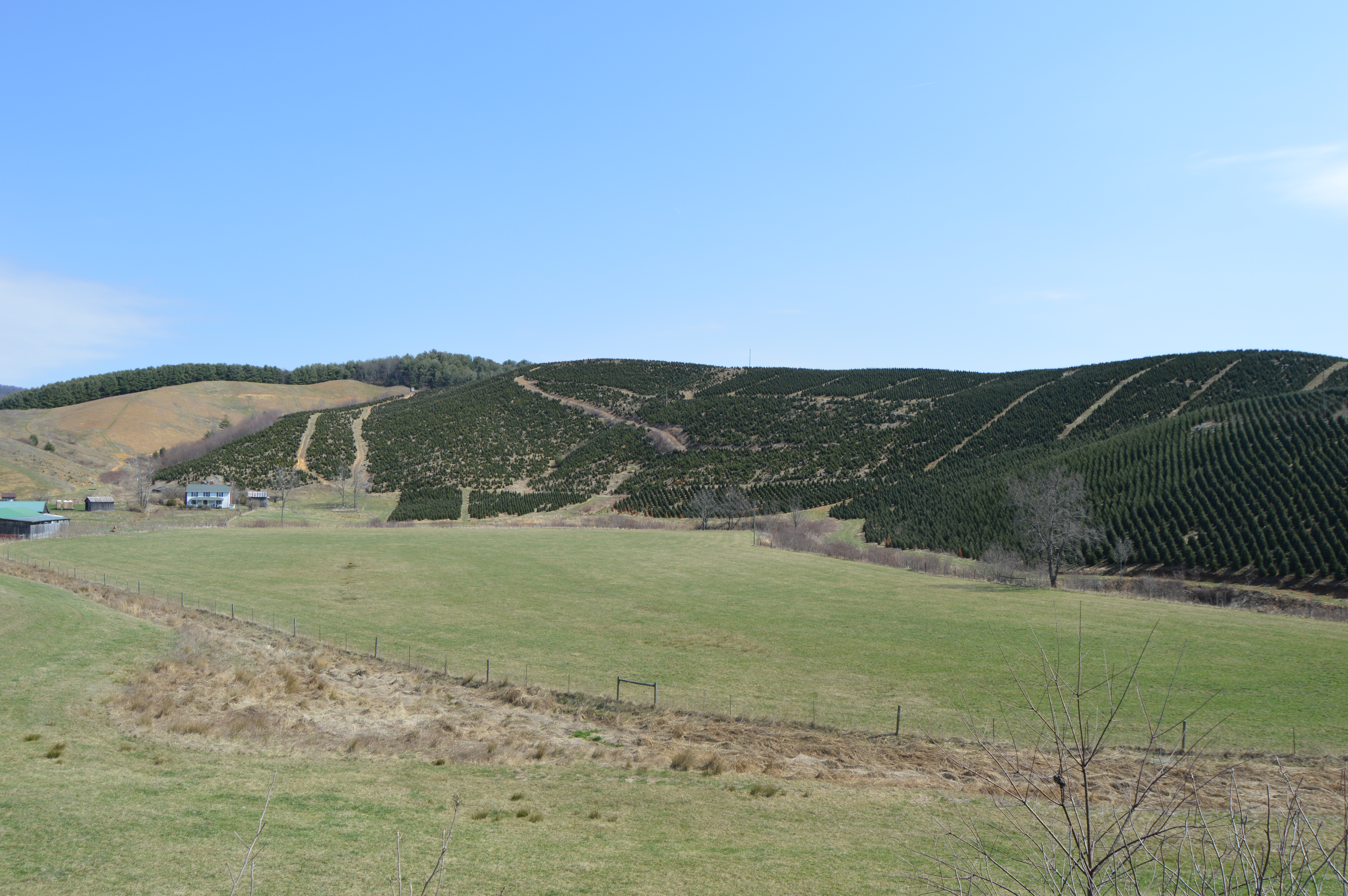
- Christmas tree farm on Spring Valley Road

- Location within Virginia Location within the United States
- Location: Route 805; Route 604; Route 651 in the Spring Valley community, near Fries, Virginia
- Coordinates: 36°44′17″N 80°03′58″W
- Area: 4,220 acres (1,710 ha)
- Architectural style: log house, I-house
- NRHP reference No.: 11000062
- VLR No.: 038-5269

Significant dates
- Added to NRHP: March 1, 2011
- Designated VLR: December 16, 2010

Spring Valley Rural Historic District is a national historic district located near Fries, Grayson County, Virginia, United States. The district encompasses 184 contributing buildings, 3 contributing sites, and 1 contributing object in the wooded and agricultural northeastern corner of Grayson County. It includes mostly frame or log structures, with a few brick buildings, and several well-preserved examples of early-19th century log dwellings still in use.

Notable buildings include the Knob Fork Primitive Baptist Church (c. 1800), William Bourne House "Walnut Hill" (c. 1790), Austin King House (c. 1847), Tomlinson House (c. 1851), O'Donnell Place (c. 1860), Ephraim Boyer House (c. 1870), John Fielder Farmhouse (c. 1850, c. 1870), Ebenezer Methodist Church and Cemetery (c. 1884), Spring Valley Academy (c. 1880), Glenn Cornett House (1904), and Phipps Bourne Farmstead (1909). Located in the district is the separately listed Stephen G. Bourne House.

It was listed on the National Register of Historic Places in 2011.
