= Burnt Chimney, Virginia =

Unincorporated community in Virginia, United States

- Unincorporated community
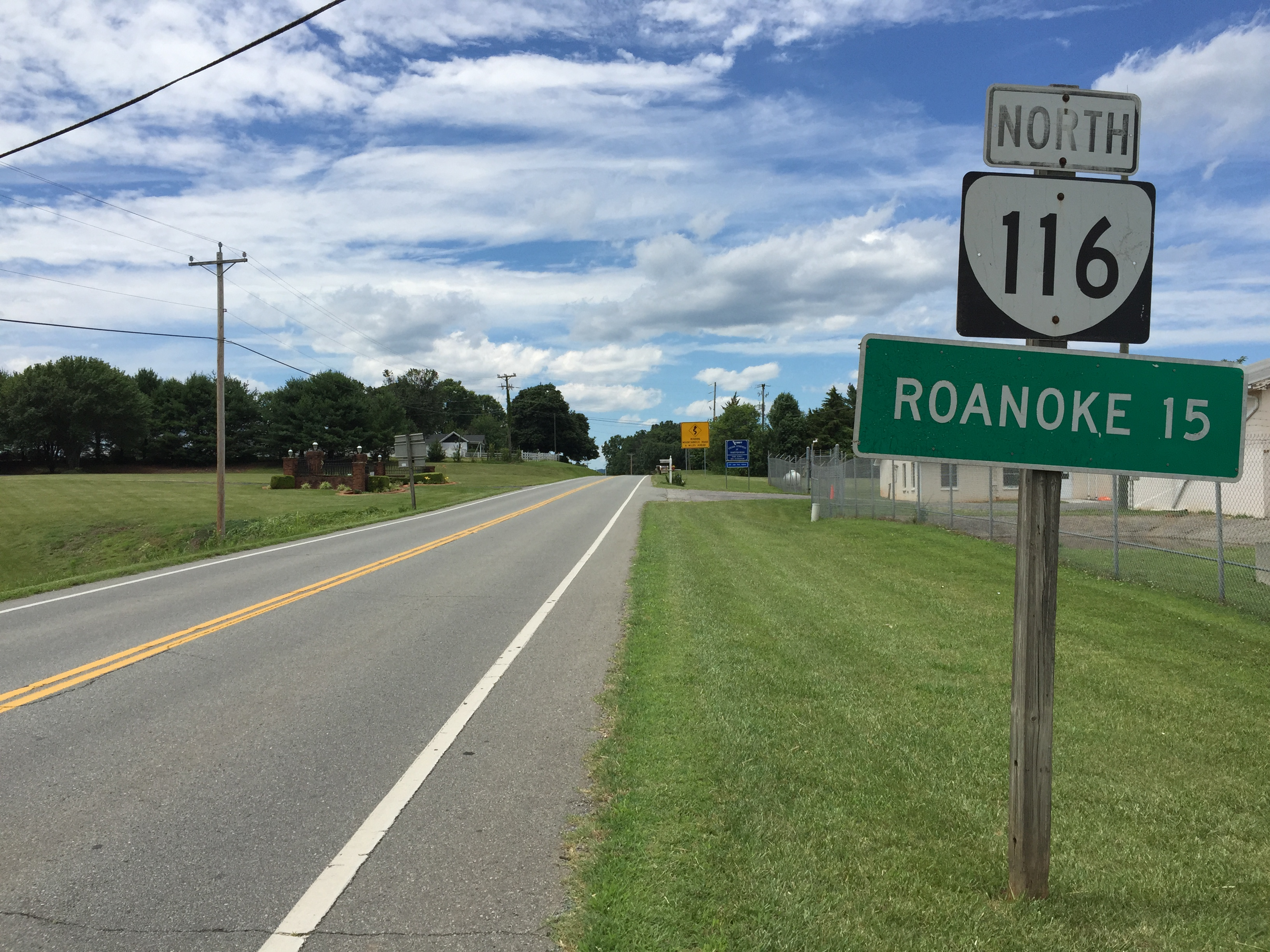
- View north along Virginia State Route 116 (Jubal Early Highway) between Saddlewood Drive (Virginia State Secondary Route 1000) and Four Corners Court in Burnt Chimney

- Location within Virginia Location within the United States
- Coordinates: 37°6′19″N 79°48′56″W
- Country: United States
- State: Virginia
- County: Franklin
- Elevation: 1,129 ft (344 m)
- Time zone: UTC-5 (Eastern (EST))
  - Summer (DST): UTC-4 (EDT)
- GNIS feature ID: 1477160

Burnt Chimney (also called Reverie) is an unincorporated community in Franklin County, Virginia, United States. A farm named Waverly was listed on the National Register of Historic Places in 1996.
