= Waverly Village Hall =

Waverly Village Hall may refer to:

- Waverly Village Hall (Waverly, Minnesota)
- Waverly Village Hall (Waverly, New York)
