= Spring Valley, Stafford County, Virginia =

Unincorporated community in Virginia, US

Coordinates: 38.33124°N 77.46054°W

Spring Valley is an unincorporated community in Stafford County, in the U.S. state of Virginia.
