= Waverly (Leesburg, Virginia) =

Historic house in Virginia, United States

- U.S. National Register of Historic Places
- Virginia Landmarks Register
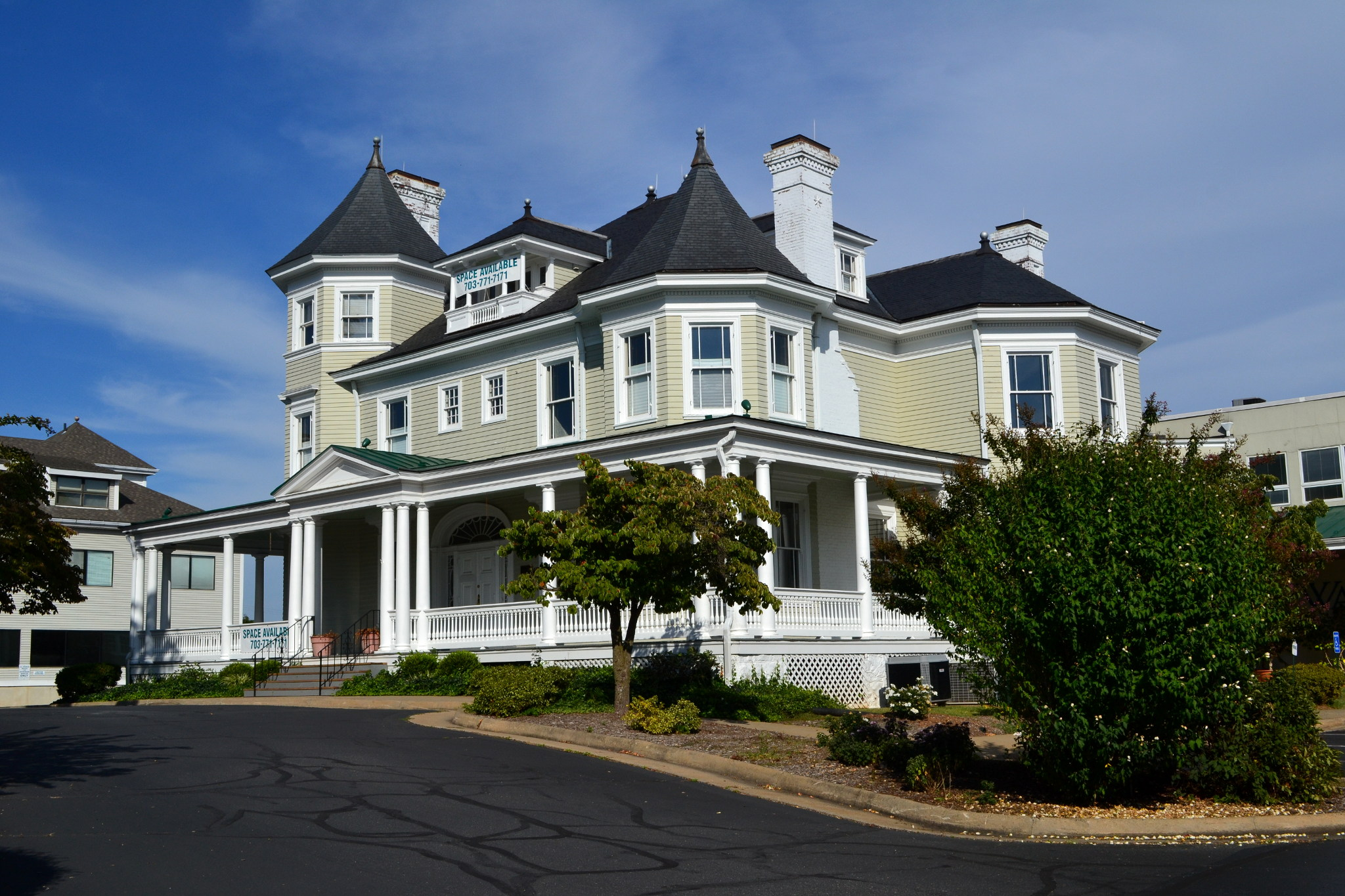

- Location within Northern Virginia Location within Virginia Location within the United States
- Location: S. King St., Leesburg, Virginia
- Coordinates: 39°6′22″N 77°34′5″W
- Area: 3.8 acres (1.5 ha)
- Built: 1890
- Built by: John Norris & Sons
- Architectural style: Colonial Revival, Queen Anne
- NRHP reference No.: 83003288
- VLR No.: 253-0048

Significant dates
- Added to NRHP: February 10, 1983
- Designated VLR: May 18, 1982

Waverly is a mansion in Leesburg, Virginia that was built for Robert Townley Hempstone (1842–1913) about 1890. The turreted frame house combines the Queen Anne style with elements of Colonial Revival architecture. Hempstone, a Baltimore businessman, retired to the property that was then on the southern outskirts of Leesburg. The house was built by John Norris and Sons, who were responsible for many prominent houses, churches and commercial structures in Leesburg. Norris' son, Lemuel Watson Norris, became an architect in Washington, D.C. and designed projects for his father's firm.

== Description ==
Described as "opulent," the 2 1/2-story house is arranged with a square main section to the front, with a rear service wing. The front, on the west side of the house, is sheltered by a full-width single-story porch that wraps partway around the north and south sides. The main entry is a pair of doors with a fanlight transom. The interior features a center hall plan with a monumental stair offset to one side. The stair features a stained glass Palladian window on the landing between the first and second floors. The expansive central hall is flanked by drawing rooms, a dining room, and a smaller parlor. The rear wing houses service areas with servant quarters on the second floor. The main house is isolated from the servants' quarters on the second floor. A turret on the attic level is the only finished room on the third floor.

== History ==
Hempstone died in 1913. After several owners, the house became a restaurant in the 1950s, then a private school in the 1970s. The house was restored in the 1980s. Following a fire, Waverly was again restored in 1995 and is the main feature of an office center. Waverly is itself used for offices.
