= Bedford Historic Meetinghouse =

Historic church in Virginia, US

- U.S. National Register of Historic Places
- Virginia Landmarks Register
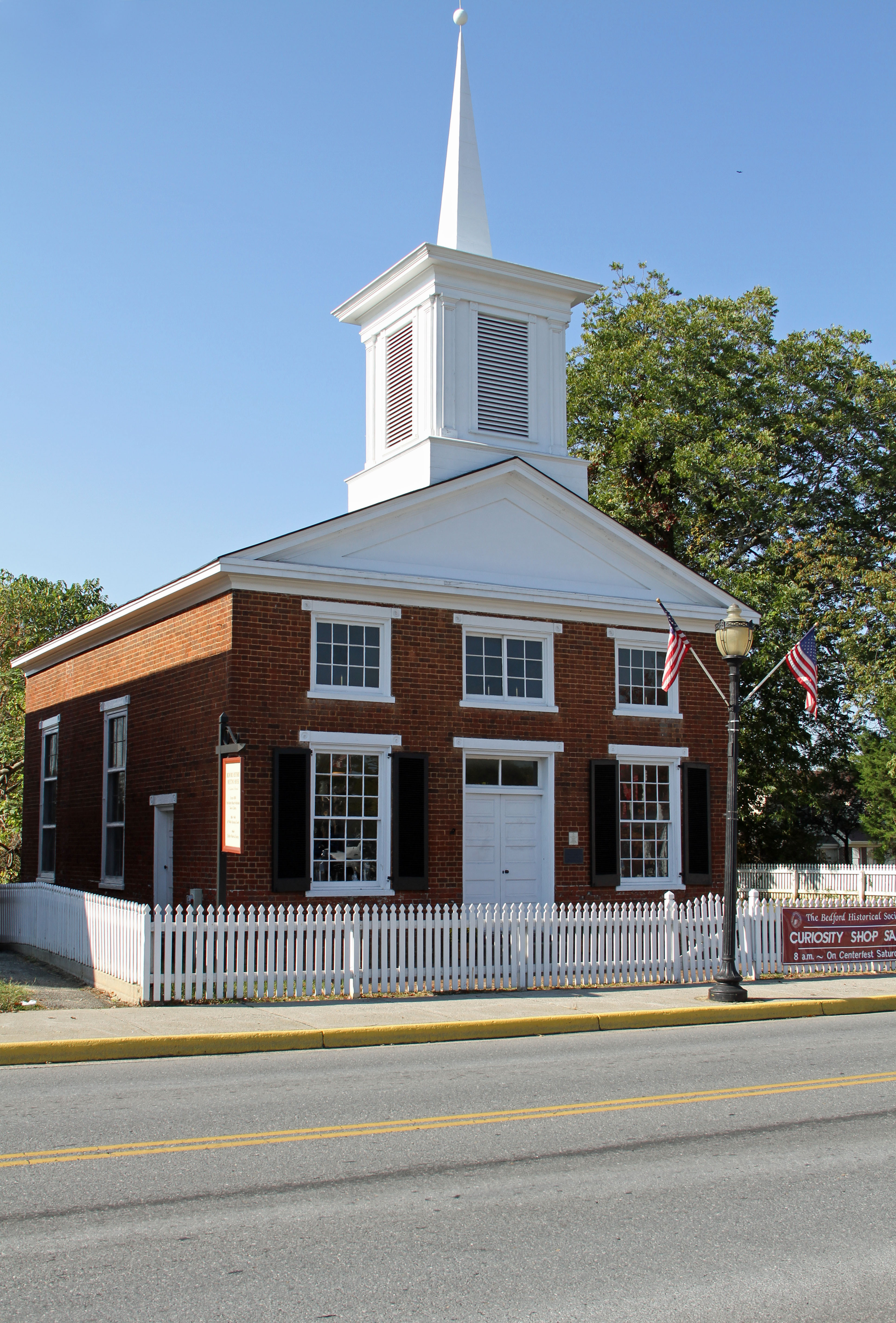
- Bedford Historic Meetinghouse, September 2012

- Location within Virginia Location within the United States
- Location: 153 W. Main St., Bedford, Virginia
- Coordinates: 37°20′5″N 79°31′32″W
- Area: less than one acre
- Built: 1838
- Architectural style: Greek Revival
- NRHP reference No.: 78003182
- VLR No.: 141-0005

Significant dates
- Added to NRHP: January 31, 1978
- Designated VLR: September 20, 1977

Bedford Historic Meetinghouse, also known as Methodist Meetinghouse and St. Philip's Episcopal Church, is a historic meeting house located at 153 W. Main Street in Bedford, Virginia. It was built in 1838, and is a brick building measuring 38 feet by 58 feet and in the Greek Revival style. It features a shallow, pedimented gable roof topped by a square belfry with a stubby, tapered spire. It was built as Bedford's first Methodist Church and houses the headquarters of the Bedford Historical Society.

It was listed on the National Register of Historic Places in 1978.
