= Waverly (Burnt Chimney, Virginia) =

Historic house in Virginia, United States

- U.S. National Register of Historic Places
- Virginia Landmarks Register
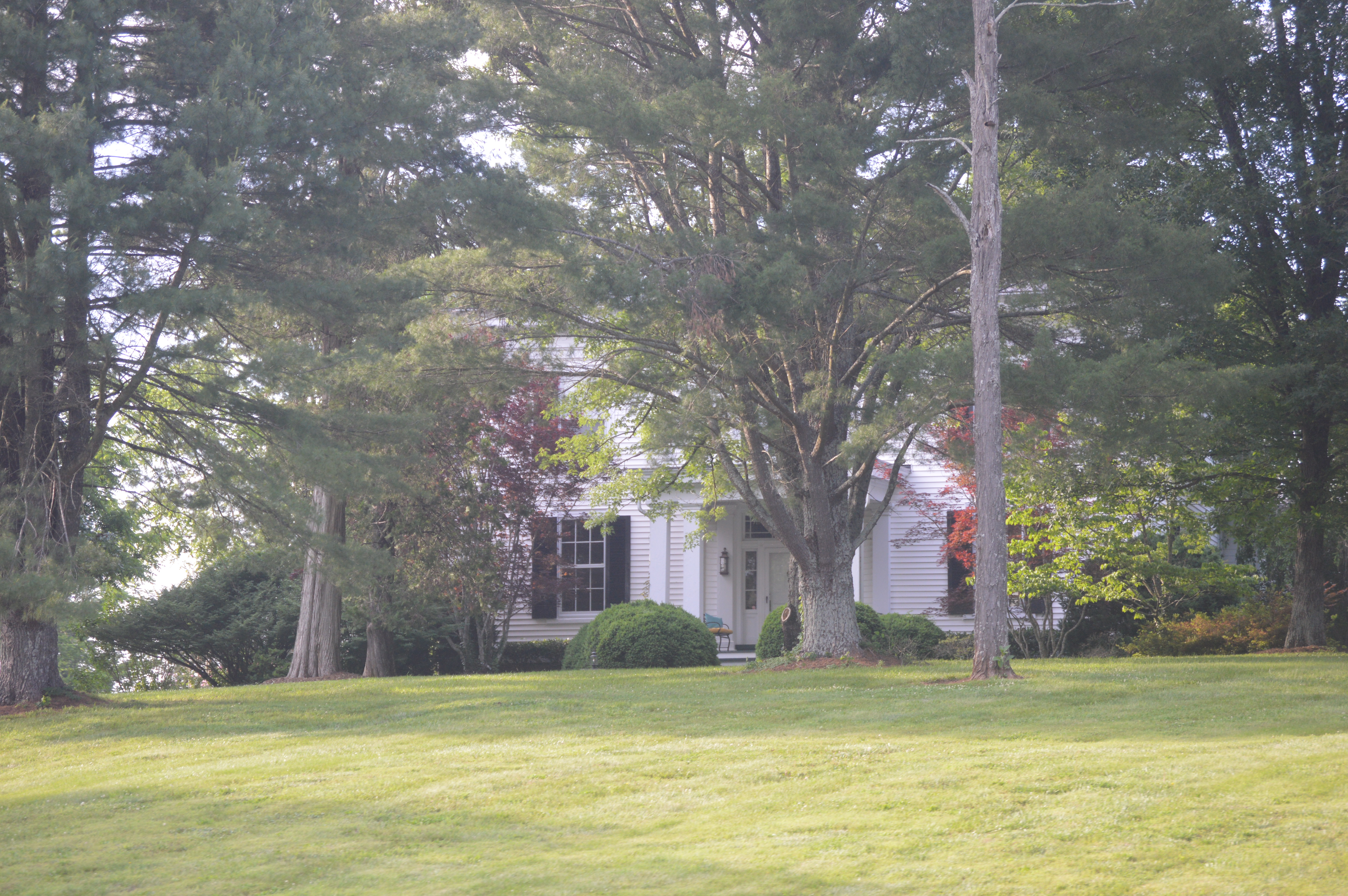
- Roadside view

- Location within Virginia Location within the United States
- Location: 1605 Cahas Mountain Rd., near Burnt Chimney, Virginia
- Coordinates: 37°7′10″N 79°47′28″W
- Area: 8.4 acres (3.4 ha)
- Built: 1858
- Built by: Seth Richardson
- Architectural style: Greek Revival
- NRHP reference No.: 96001329
- VLR No.: 033-0028

Significant dates
- Added to NRHP: November 7, 1996
- Designated VLR: June 19, 1996

Waverly is a historic home and farm located near Burnt Chimney, Franklin County, Virginia. It was built beginning about 1853 for Armistead Lewis Burwell (1809–1883) and his family, who inherited it (or received it as a dowry) from the parents of his wife, Mary Hix (1811–1895). Descended from the First Families of Virginia, Armistead L. Burwell operated a tobacco and grain plantation of about 350 improved acres using enslaved labor, and also had a chewing tobacco factory, gristmill and sawmill by 1860 (probably also operated by some of his 37 slaves per that year's federal census). His son William A. Burwell (1836–1882) ran the factory and bought the plantation from his father in 1864, and sold it in 1868 to his younger brother John Spotswood Burwell (1846–1926, a Confederate drummer during the war) who operated a dairy farm until after the turn of the century.

The two-story frame house has a central passage plan, and reflects the Greek Revival style. Approximately 52 feet by 38 feet in size, it sits on a brick foundation. The property also includes a contributing meathouse and a foundation, icehouse ruins, and the remains of the 19th century landscaping. It was listed on the National Register of Historic Places in 1996.
