= Stephen G. Bourne House =

Historic house in Virginia, United States

- U.S. National Register of Historic Places
- Virginia Landmarks Register
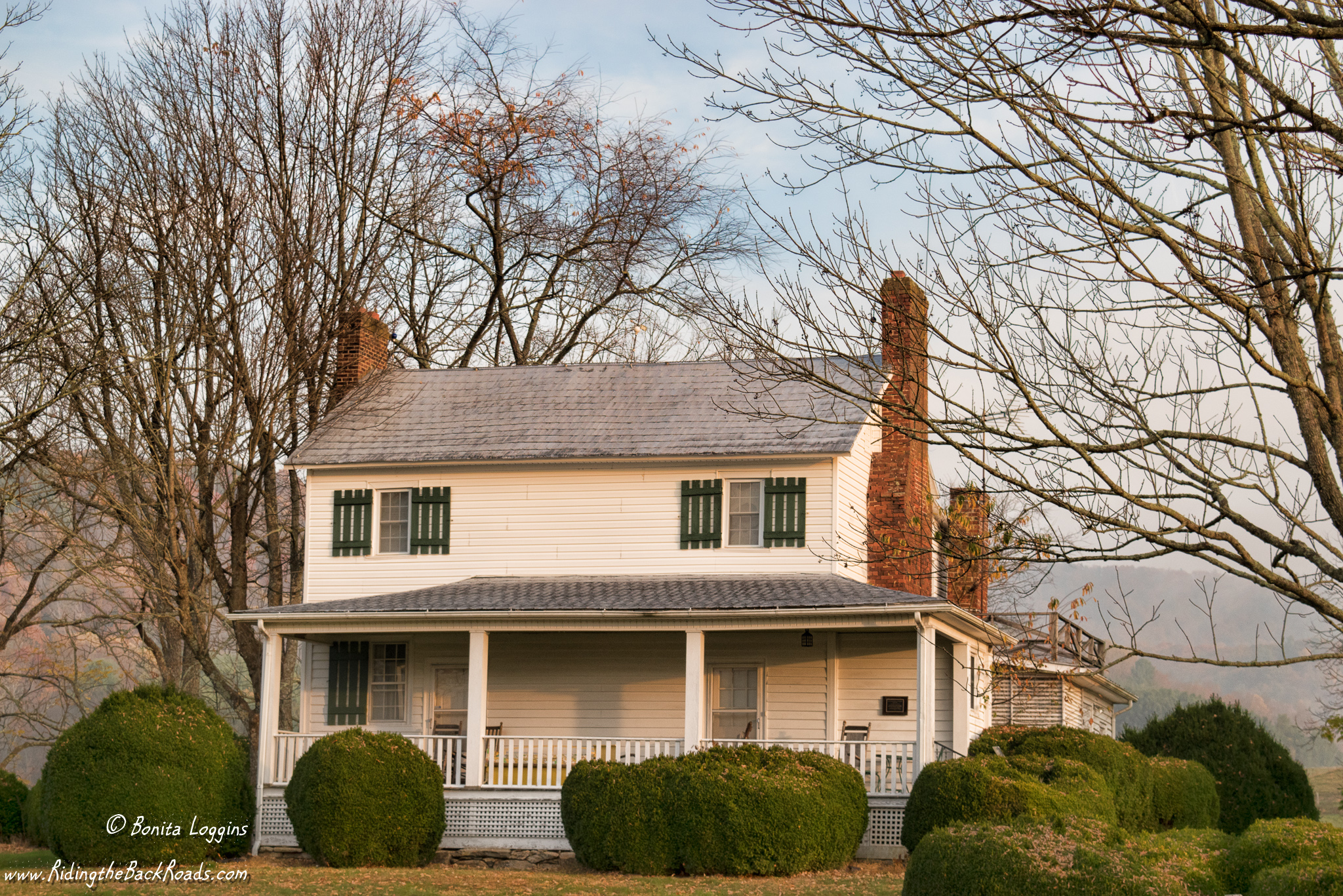

- Location within Virginia Location within the United States
- Location: 6707 Spring Valley Rd., Fries, Virginia
- Coordinates: 36°44′10″N 81°04′54″W
- Area: 98.1 acres (39.7 ha)
- Built: 1829
- Built by: Bourne, Stephen Gray
- Architectural style: Log House
- NRHP reference No.: 04000483
- VLR No.: 038-0018

Significant dates
- Added to NRHP: August 26, 2004
- Designated VLR: March 17, 2004

Stephen G. Bourne House, also known as Bourne-Hale House, is a historic home located at Fries, Grayson County, Virginia. It was built about 1829, and is a two-story, rectangular, weatherboarded log structure on a fieldstone foundation. It features a one-story, three-bay porch with square wood columns and two brick chimneys on the east end and one on the west end.

It was listed on the National Register of Historic Places in 2004.
