= Waverly, Caroline County, Virginia =

Unincorporated community in Virginia, US

Coordinates: 38°09′50″N 77°10′39″W

Waverly is an unincorporated community in Caroline County, in the U.S. state of Virginia.
