= Fries, Virginia =

- Town
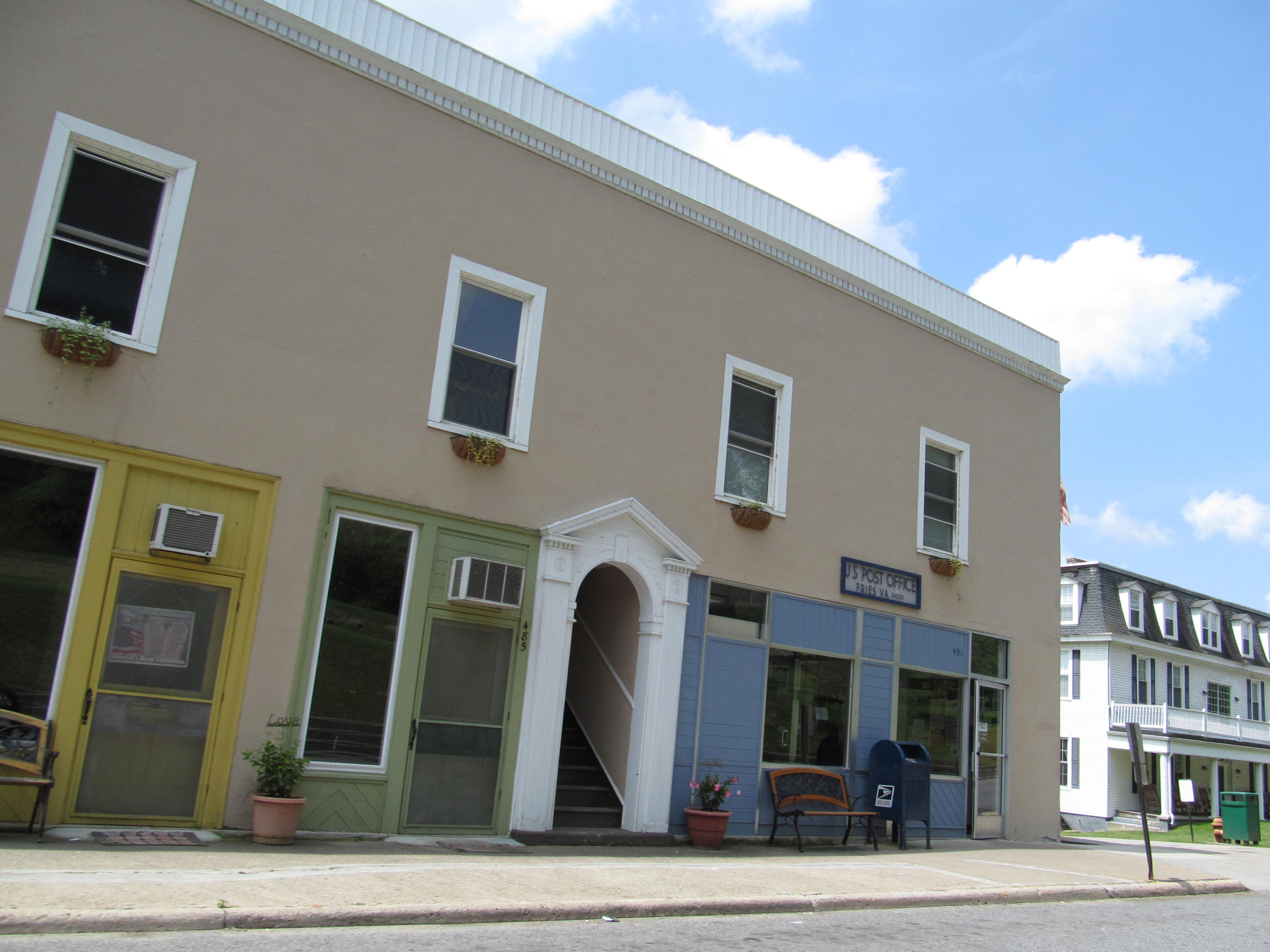
- Downtown Fries, 2012

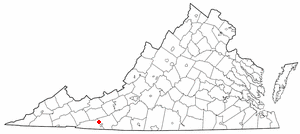
- Location of Fries, Virginia
- Coordinates: 36°42′56″N 80°58′33″W
- Country: United States
- State: Virginia
- County: Grayson

Area
  - Total: 0.82 sq mi (2.13 km^{2})
  - Land: 0.64 sq mi (1.65 km^{2})
  - Water: 0.19 sq mi (0.48 km^{2})
- Elevation: 2,185 ft (666 m)

Population (2020)
  - Total: 450 ▼
  - Estimate (2021): 451
  - Density: 699.2/sq mi (269.98/km^{2})
- Time zone: UTC−5 (Eastern (EST))
  - Summer (DST): UTC−4 (EDT)
- ZIP code: 24330
- Area code: 276
- FIPS code: 51-29920
- GNIS feature ID: 1483549
- Website: Official website

Fries (pronounced "freeze") is an incorporated town located on the New River in Grayson County, Virginia, United States, 15.5 miles (24 kilometers) northeast of the county seat of Independence — in Virginia's Blue Ridge Highlands and on Virginia's musical heritage trail, The Crooked Road.

As of the 2020 census, Fries had a population of 450.

Named after prominent cotton mill owner, Francis Henry Fries, the town is noted as the former site of Washington Mill (1903–1989); as one of three end points of the New River Trail State Park and as the host of annual music festivals reflecting its strong bluegrass and country music traditions — with its August Old-Time Fiddlers' and Bluegrass Convention and its September Festival by the New River.

== History ==
Fries was named after North Carolina cotton mill owner Colonel Francis Henry Fries. Jim 'Pipe' Carico (of Stephens Creek, Virginia, the nearest incorporated town) contacted Fries in 1900 and proposed Bartlett Falls on New River as a site for a hydroelectric dam that could power a cotton mill.

Fries purchased the surrounding rural farmland then hired a local labor force to build a dam, a cotton mill and a full-service company owned town. By 1901, the New River Train was extended to the mill site and Fries petitioned the Virginia State Legislature to incorporate the new town of Carico, VA in honor of Jim 'Pipe' Carico. For reasons that are not well documented, the town name was instead legislatively changed to Fries, Virginia and officially incorporated in 1902.

Despite the heavy reliance on manual labor, mules and oxen, the town's construction progressed quickly and the open call for employment spurred migration to the town. Around 300 houses, a post office, a church and a company commissary were wedged into the surrounding hillside before the mill began operation in February 1903 — with "the most sophisticated technology in the world."

After changing hands numerous times, the mill closed in 1989. At the time the mill closed, it employed 1,700 people.

Fries High School also closed in 1989. The students from Fries, along with students from nearby Independence High School, were combined to form Grayson County High School, located in Independence.

The Stephen G. Bourne House, Fries Boarding Houses, and Spring Valley Rural Historic District are listed on the National Register of Historic Places.

== Culture ==
Although the entire Appalachian region is known for its Bluegrass and traditional, or "old-timey" music and musicians, the region around Mount Airy, North Carolina is one of the few areas of the United States where this music has remained prominent, even among young people. The Old Fiddler's Convention, one of the most prominent traditional music contests in the United States, has been held annually in the nearby city of Galax since 1935. It has long attracted the best up-and-coming bluegrass musicians. The Blue Ridge Music Center with its amphitheater and music museum of old-time music is just a short distance away on the Blue Ridge Parkway at Milepost 213 (kilometer 342.8).

== Geography ==
Fries is located at 36°42′56″N 80°58′33″W (36.715537, −80.975849).

According to the United States Census Bureau, the town has a total area of 0.8 square mile (2.1 km^{2}), of which 0.6 square mile (1.7 km^{2}) is land and 0.2 square mile (0.4 km^{2}) (19.75%) is water.

== Demographics ==
Historical population
Census	Pop.	Note	%±
1910	1,775		—
1920	2,029		14.3%
1930	2,205		8.7%
1940	1,555		−29.5%
1950	1,442		−7.3%
1960	1,039		−27.9%
1970	885		−14.8%
1980	758		−14.4%
1990	690		−9.0%
2000	614		−11.0%
2010	484		−21.2%
2020	450		−7.0%
2024 (est.)	333	▼	−26.0%
U.S. Decennial Census

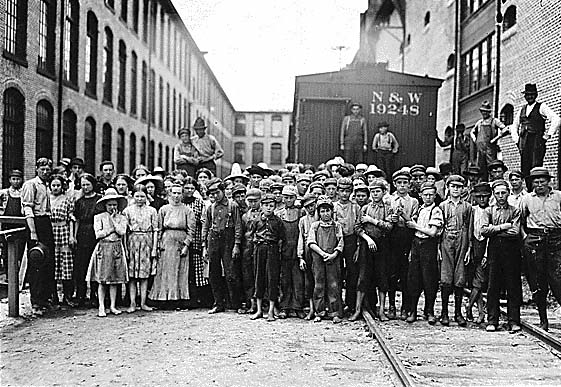
A part of the spinning force working in the Washington Cotton Mills. May 1911, Photograph by Lewis Hine

As of the census of 2010, there were 484 people, 255 households, and 144 families residing in the town.

The following data is from the census of 2000. The population density was 947.8 people per square mile (364.7/km^{2}). There were 337 housing units at an average density of 520.2 per square mile (200.2/km^{2}). The racial makeup of the town was 98.70% White, 0.65% African American, 0.16% Native American, 0.16% from other races, and 0.33% from two or more races. Hispanic or Latino of any race were 0.98% of the population.

There were 298 households, out of which 17.4% had children under the age of 18 living with them, 46.3% were married couples living together, 9.1% had a female householder with no husband present, and 40.6% were non-families. 39.3% of all households were made up of individuals, and 23.8% had someone living alone who was 65 years of age or older. The average household size was 2.06 and the average family size was 2.71.

In the town, the population was spread out, with 16.8% under the age of 18, 7.0% from 18 to 24, 19.4% from 25 to 44, 28.8% from 45 to 64, and 28.0% who were 65 years of age or older. The median age was 49 years. For every 100 females, there were 75.9 males. For every 100 females age 18 and over, there were 72.1 males.

The median income for a household in the town was $21,250, and the median income for a family was $30,250. Males had a median income of $27,946 versus $18,472 for females. The per capita income for the town was $13,107. About 14.1% of families and 17.8% of the population were below the poverty line, including 26.8% of those under age 18 and 14.4% of those age 65 or over.

== Recreation ==
New River Trail State Park, a 57.7 miles (92.9 km) rail trail park has a 5.5 spur from Fries Junction on the main trail to Fries, Virginia — giving Fries one of its three end points.

The historic Fries Recreation Center is located in downtown Fries.

In 1910 an increasing need was seen for a community center for the employees of the mill. A site was selected that would be central for the townspeople and construction was begun for the Fries Lyceum.

The building provided reading rooms, and a skating rink became the gathering place for the young people of the town. In 1923, the Lyceum was renovated and reorganized as a Young Men's Christian Association (YMCA). The building now contained the only gymnasium in the Carroll-Grayson area, along with a movie theatre. The need to expand was seen again in the late 1940s, and in 1948, a new lobby, bowling alley, kitchen and dining area, library, and additional game rooms were added. The swimming pool built in the front, facing the New River, was the most popular addition.

Through the years semi-professional baseball was sponsored by the "Y". It has housed meetings for the Fries Garden Club, organized in 1932, Fries Lions Club organized in 1938, and the Fries Women's Club organized in 1953.

The Fries Recreation center hosts The Boy Scouts of America and Girl Scouts of the USA, Red Cross Training Courses, Hunter Safety Courses, visiting community minded college students, and many more groups and activities.

The Fries Recreation Center also houses the Fries Town Hall and the Fries Police Department

== Bibliography ==
- Fussell, Fred C. (2003). Blue Ridge Music Trails: Finding a Place in the Circle. North Carolina Folklife Institute. 080785459X.
- Bond, Avery; Nichols, Martha. "History of Fries, VA". Grayson Area Information Network. Archived from the original on February 20, 2007.
