= Waverley =

Waverley may refer to:

== Arts and entertainment ==
- Waverley (novel), by Sir Walter Scott
  - Waverley Overture, a work by Hector Berlioz inspired by Scott's novel
- Waverley Harrison, a character in the New Zealand soap opera Shortland Street
- Bernice Waverley, a character in the Australian series City Homicide

== Places ==
=== Australia ===
==== New South Wales ====
- Waverley, New South Wales, a suburb in the Eastern Suburbs of Sydney
- Electoral district of Waverley, New South Wales, a former electoral district
- Waverley Cemetery, in the suburbs of Sydney, New South Wales
- Waverley Council, a local government area in Sydney

==== Queensland ====
- Waverley, Queensland, a locality in the Boulia Shire

==== Tasmania ====
- Waverley, Tasmania, a suburb of Launceston

==== Victoria ====
- Waverley Province, Victoria, a former electorate of the Victorian Legislative Council
- City of Waverley, Victoria, a local government area from 1857 to 1994

==== Western Australia ====
- Waverley, Western Australia, an abandoned goldfields town also known as Siberia
- Waverley, a local name of Cannington, Western Australia, East Cannington and Beckenham

=== Canada ===
- Waverley, Nova Scotia, a suburban community in the Halifax Regional Municipality
- Waverley Park (Thunder Bay), a municipal park in Thunder Bay, Ontario
- Waverley (electoral district), an electoral district in Manitoba
- Rural Municipality of Waverley No. 44, Saskatchewan
- Waverly (London, Ontario), also spelled Waverley, designated heritage property

=== New Zealand ===
- Waverley, Otago, a suburb of Dunedin
- Waverley, Taranaki, a small town

=== South Africa ===
- Waverley, Johannesburg
- Waverley, Pretoria
- Waverley, Mpumalanga, a small border crossing between South Africa and Eswatini

=== United Kingdom ===
- Waverley, South Yorkshire, a region of Rotherham, England
- Borough of Waverley, a borough in Surrey, England
  - Waverley Abbey, after which the borough is named

=== United States ===
- Waverly (Marriottsville, Maryland), also spelled Waverley, listed on the National Register of Historic Places (NRHP)
- Waverley (Morgantown, Maryland), listed on the NRHP
- Waverley, a neighborhood in Belmont, Massachusetts
- Waverley (West Point, Mississippi), a National Historic Landmark
- Waverley Historic District (Enid, Oklahoma), listed on the NRHP

== Schools ==
- Waverley College, a Catholic secondary school for boys in Sydney, Australia
- Waverley Christian College, Melbourne, Australia, an inter-denominational, co-educational independent Christian school
- Waverley School, Birmingham, England, a mixed all-through school
- Waverley School, former name of Harris Girls' Academy East Dulwich, London, England
- Waverley Girls' High School, Waverley, Johannesburg, South Africa

== Transportation ==
- GWR Waverley Class, a class of Great Western Railway broad-gauge steam locomotives, England
- Edinburgh Waverley railway station, the main railway station in Edinburgh, Scotland
  - Waverley Route, former railway line in Scotland, later reinstated between Edinburgh and Tweedbank
- Waverley (passenger train), an express train from London St Pancras to Edinburgh Waverley which ceased operating in 1968
- Waverley Bridge, a road bridge in Edinburgh, Scotland
- PS Waverley, a paddle steamer based on the River Clyde in Scotland
  - For other, no longer existing ships of this name see List of ships named PS Waverley
- Waverley Bus Depot, in the Sydney, Australia suburb of Bondi Junction
- Waverley Rail Trail, a combined shared-use path for cyclists and pedestrians and on-road bicycle route in the suburbs of Melbourne, Australia
- Winnipeg Route 80, known locally as Waverley Street, Winnipeg, Manitoba, Canada
- Waverley (MBTA station), a transit station in Belmont, Massachusetts, United States
- Waverley Cycles / Waverley Bicycles, produced by the Waverley Company (also known as Indiana Bicycle Company), Indianapolis, Indiana, USA, in the late 1800s and early 1900s

== Australian sports ==
- Waverley Football Club, an Australian rules football club from 1961 until 1987, based in the Melbourne suburb of Glen Waverley
- Waverley Rugby Club, based in Waverley, New South Wales
- Waverley Cricket Club, former longtime name of Eastern Suburbs Cricket Club, a wandering cricket team from the Surrey/Hants area
- Waverley Baseball Club, based in Glen Waverley
- Waverley Hockey Club, based in the suburbs of Melbourne
- Waverley Park, a disused sporting stadium in Melbourne, formerly used for Australian rules football, now a training venue

== People ==
- Waverley Turner Carmichael (1881–1936), African-American writer
- Waverley S. Ivey (1861–1938), American politician
- Waverley Root (1903–1982), American journalist and writer

== Other uses ==
- Viscount Waverley, a title in the peerage of the United Kingdom
- Waverley Country Club, Portland, Oregon, United States
- The Waverley pen nib, made by Macniven and Cameron, a popular 19th-century writing instrument named after the Waverley novels

== See also ==
- Pope-Waverley, early 20th-century automobiles made in Indiana, U.S.
- Waverly (disambiguation)
- Wavorly
