= Waverley station (disambiguation) =

Edinburgh Waverley railway station is the principal railway station serving Edinburgh, Scotland.

Waverley station may also refer to:

- Glen Waverley railway station, a commuter railway station in Melbourne, Victoria, Australia
- Mount Waverley railway station, a commuter railway station in Melbourne, Victoria, Australia
- Waverley railway station, Canterbury, a former station near Christchurch, New Zealand.
- Waverley railway station, Taranaki, a former railway station in Waverley, New Zealand
- Waverley Road railway station, a former station in Malvern East, Victoria, Australia
- Waverley station (MBTA), a commuter rail station in Belmont, Massachusetts, United States

== See also ==
- Waverley (disambiguation)
