= Pope-Waverley =

Defunct American motor vehicle manufacturer

Pope-Waverly Waverly Company
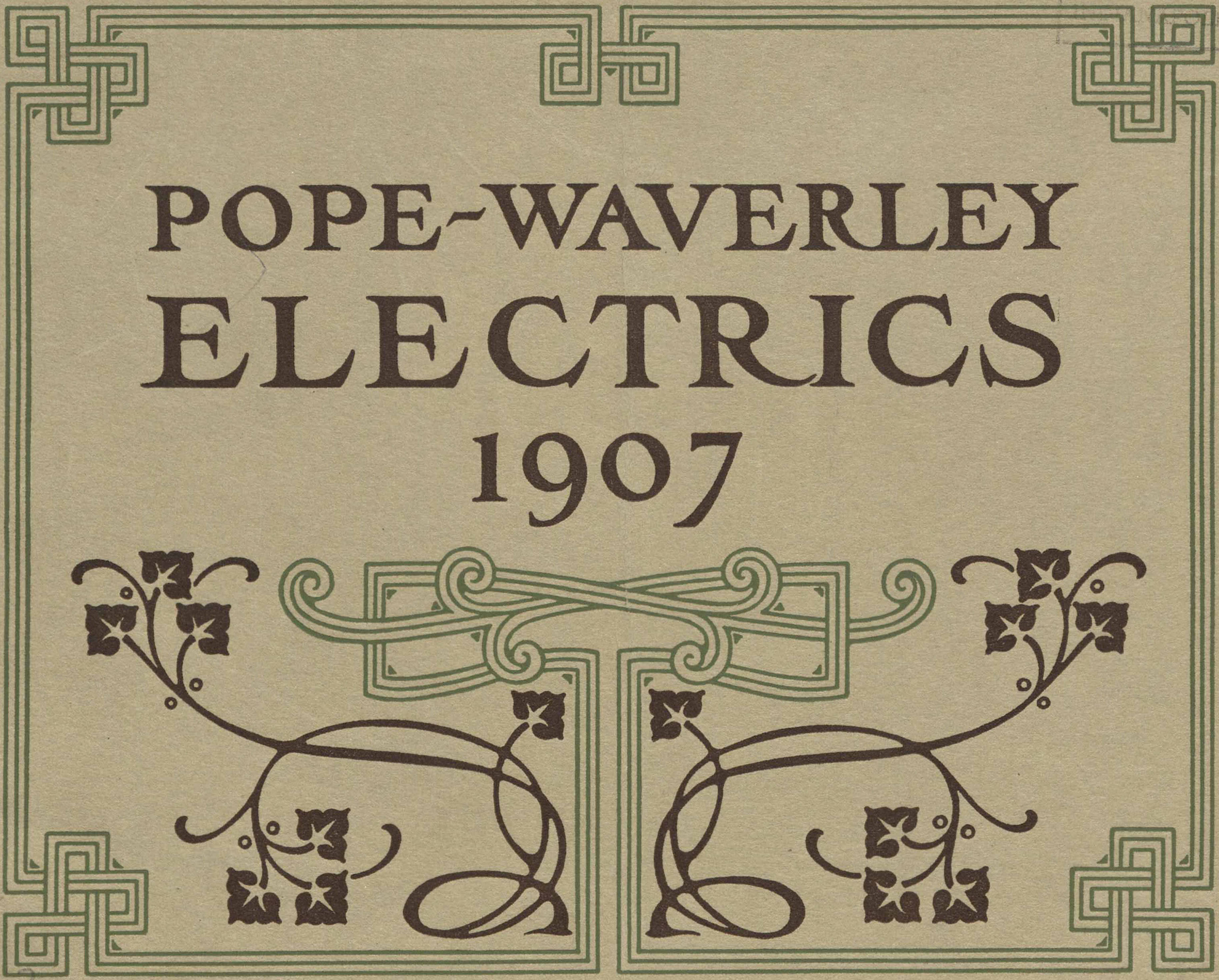
- The Silent Waverley
- Formerly: International Motor Car Company
- Industry: Automotive
- Founded: 1898; 128 years ago
- Defunct: 1916; 110 years ago
- Fate: Closed
- Headquarters: Indianapolis, Indiana, United States
- Products: Electric automobiles
- Brands: Waverley, Pope-Waverley

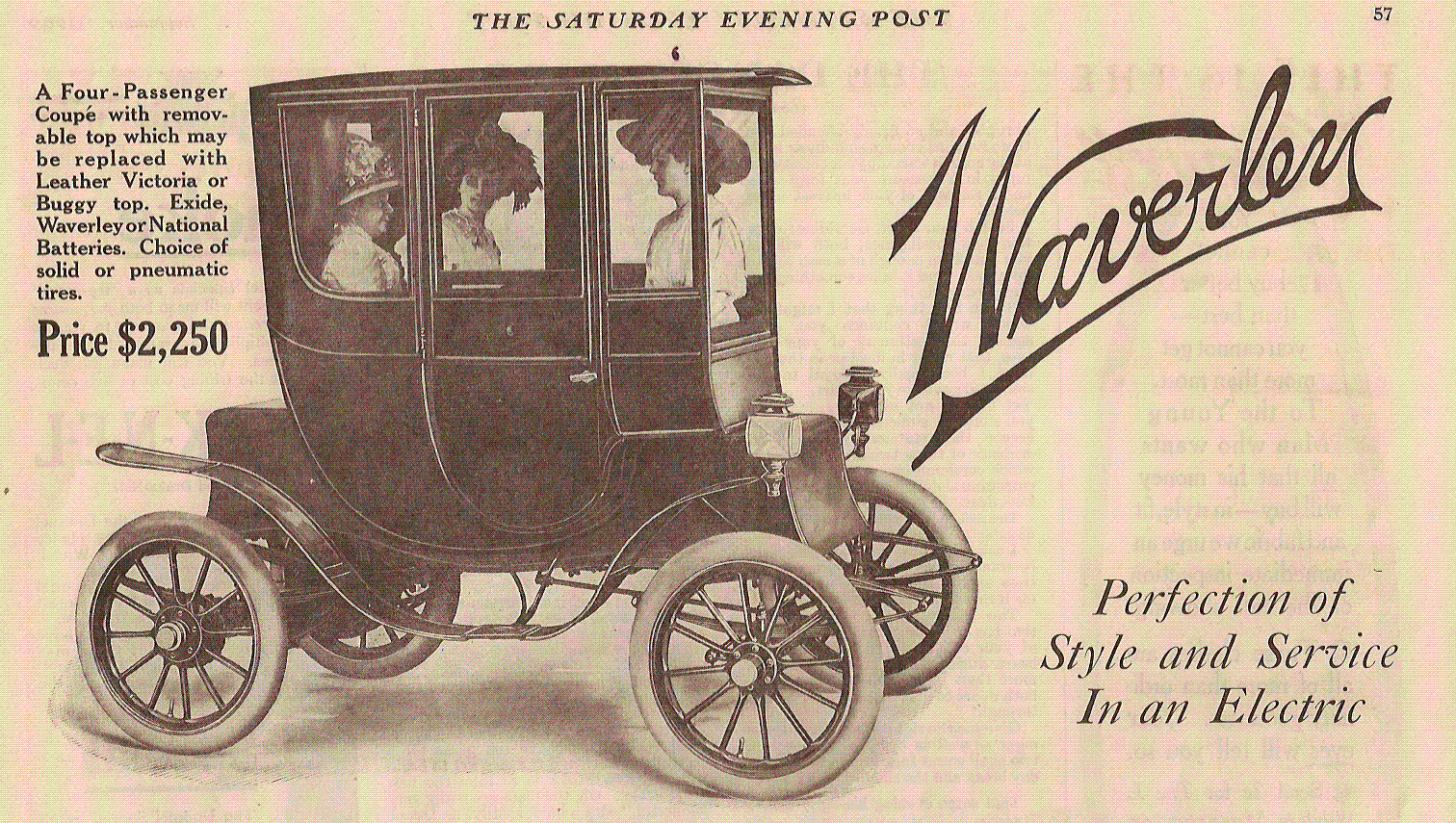
1910 Waverley Coupe

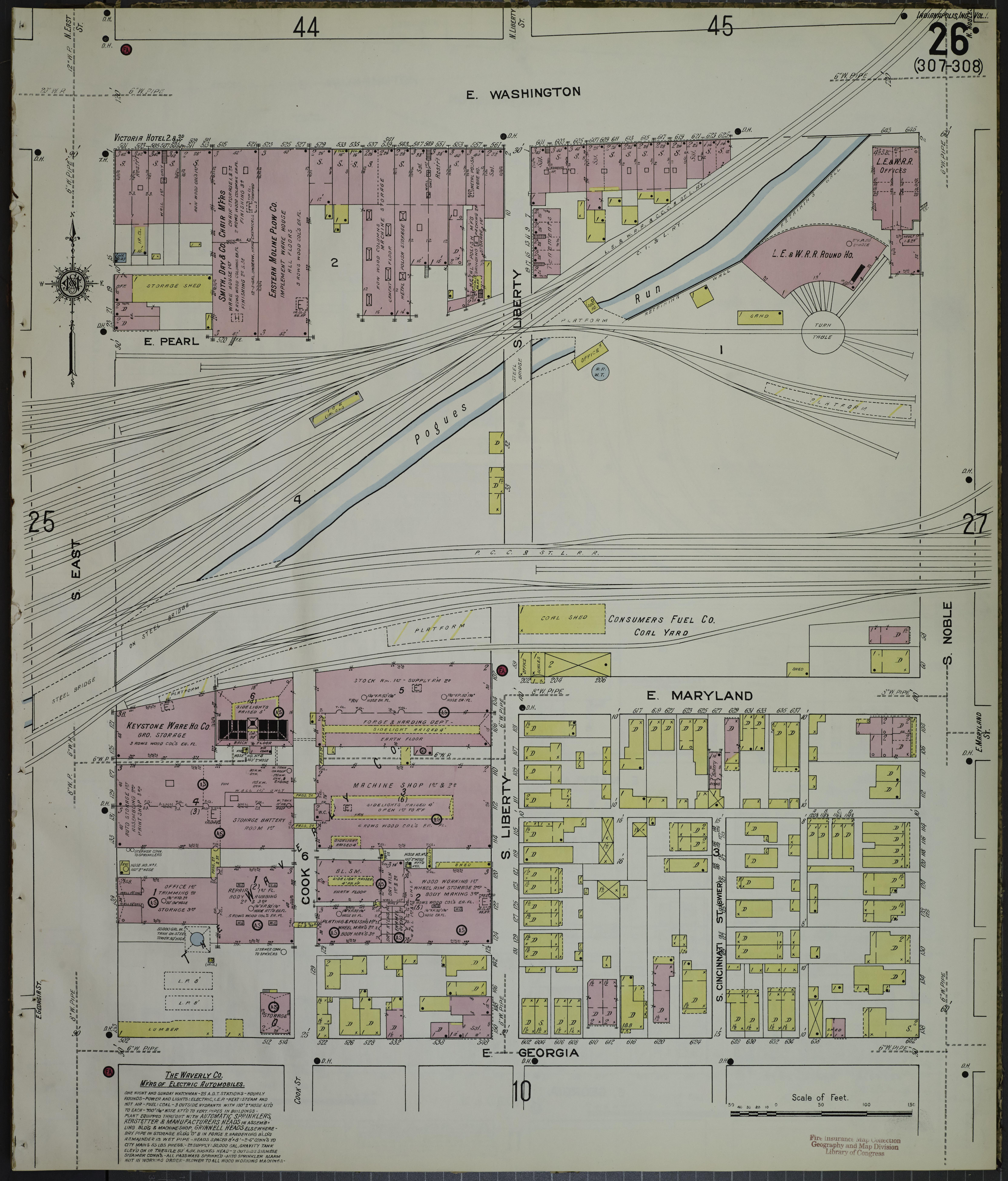
1914 Waverley plant

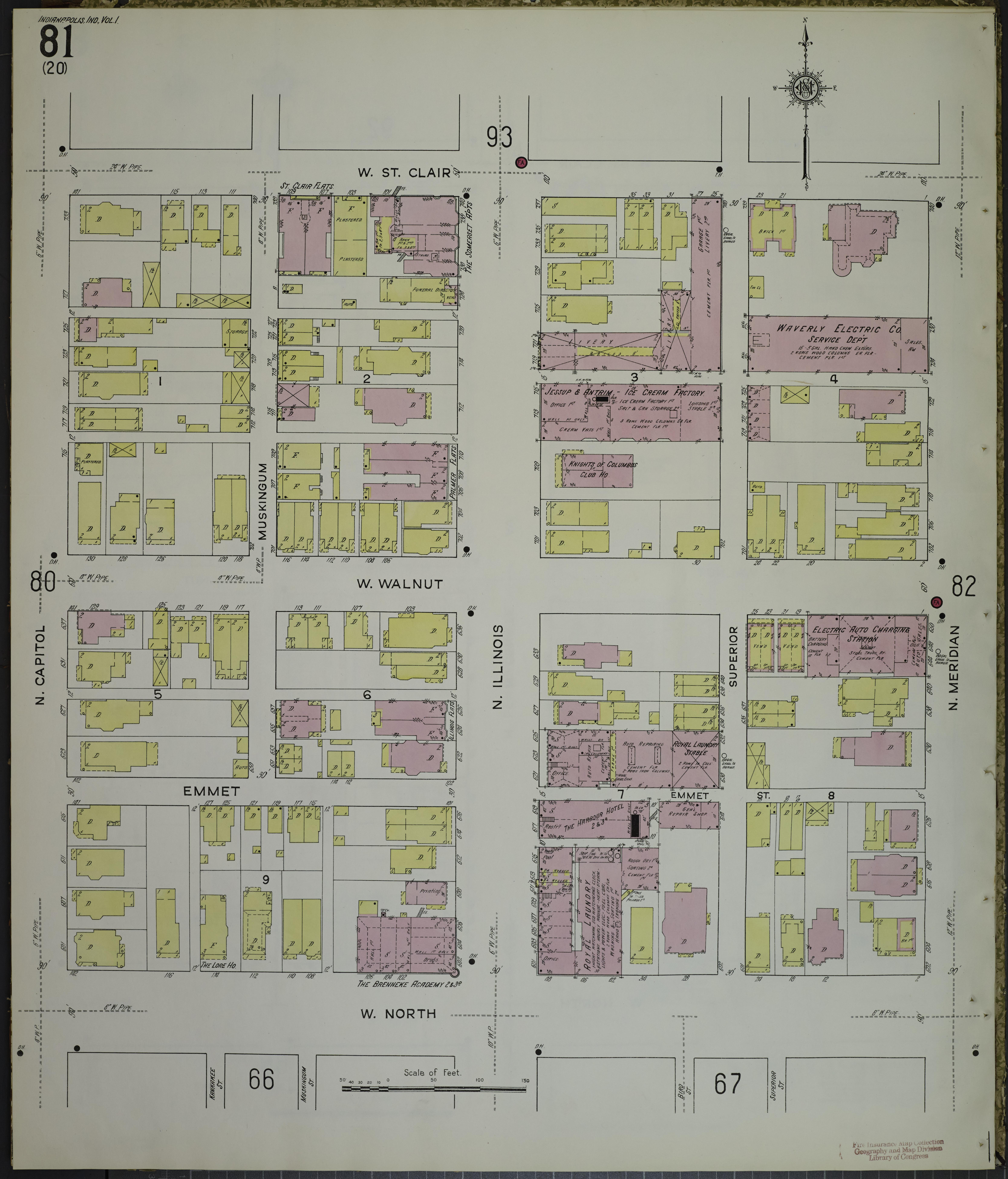
1914 Waverley Service Depot

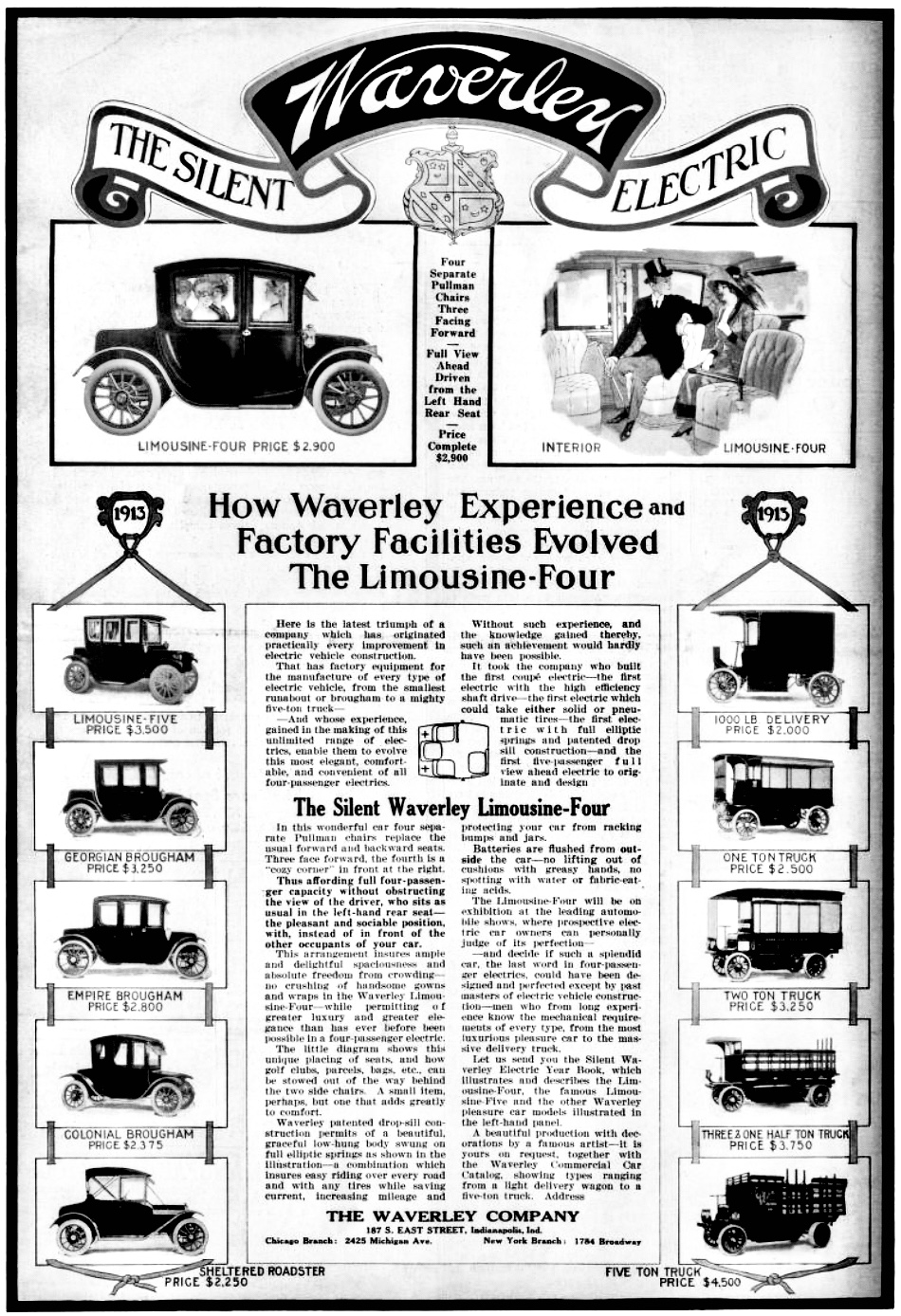
Waverley advertisement (1913)

Pope-Waverley was one of the marques of the Pope Motor Car Company founded by Albert Augustus Pope and was a manufacturer of Brass Era electric automobiles in Indianapolis, Indiana. From 1908 until production ceased in 1914 they became independent again as the Waverley Company.

== History ==
The company was originally formed as the Indiana Bicycle Company in 1898, changing to the American Bicycle Company in 1900. In 1901, it became the International Motor Car Company, before joining the Pope group as the Waverley Department of Pope Motor Car Company in 1904. Originally a small runabout, the Waverley grew to include 4 seats by 1902. When the Pope empire was foundering in 1908, Indianapolis businessmen rescued the Pope-Waverley and established a new Waverley Company to continue production. From 1912, the Waverley had a hood to resemble a gasoline car. This was called the Sheltered Roaster but it later became the Model 90. Front Drive and Rear Drive model designations were used based on the drivers seating position.

Waverley Company ceased production in 1916.

== Models ==
The 1904 Pope-Waverley Chelsea was a runabout model with the internal model designation 26. It could seat 2 passengers and sold for US$1100. The single electric motor was situated at the rear of the car, and produced 3 hp (2.2 kW). The car used 24 battery cells, affording 48 volts. The wheelbase was 2032 mm. Speeds between 5 and 15 miles per hour could be regulated.

The 1904 Pope-Waverley Road Wagon, model 21, was a smaller wagon model. It could seat 2 passengers with an open box at the rear for cargo and sold for US$850. The single electric motor was situated at the rear of the car and produced 3 hp (2.2 kW). The car used a 24-cell battery affording 48 volts and could travel at 5 or 15 mph (8.0 or 24.1 km/h). The wheelbase was 1541 mm.

The 1904 Pope-Waverley Edison Battery Wagon, model 28, was a runabout model with 48-cell Edison batteries. It could seat 2 passengers and sold for US$2250. The electric motor was situated at the rear of the car.

The 1904 Pope-Waverley Tonneau was a tonneau model. It could seat 5 passengers and sold for US$1800. Twin electric motors were situated at the rear of the car, producing 3 hp (2.2 kW) each with a special 12 hp (8.9 kW) overload mode. The armored wood-framed car used 40 batteries and could reach 15 mph (24 km/h).

== Gallery ==
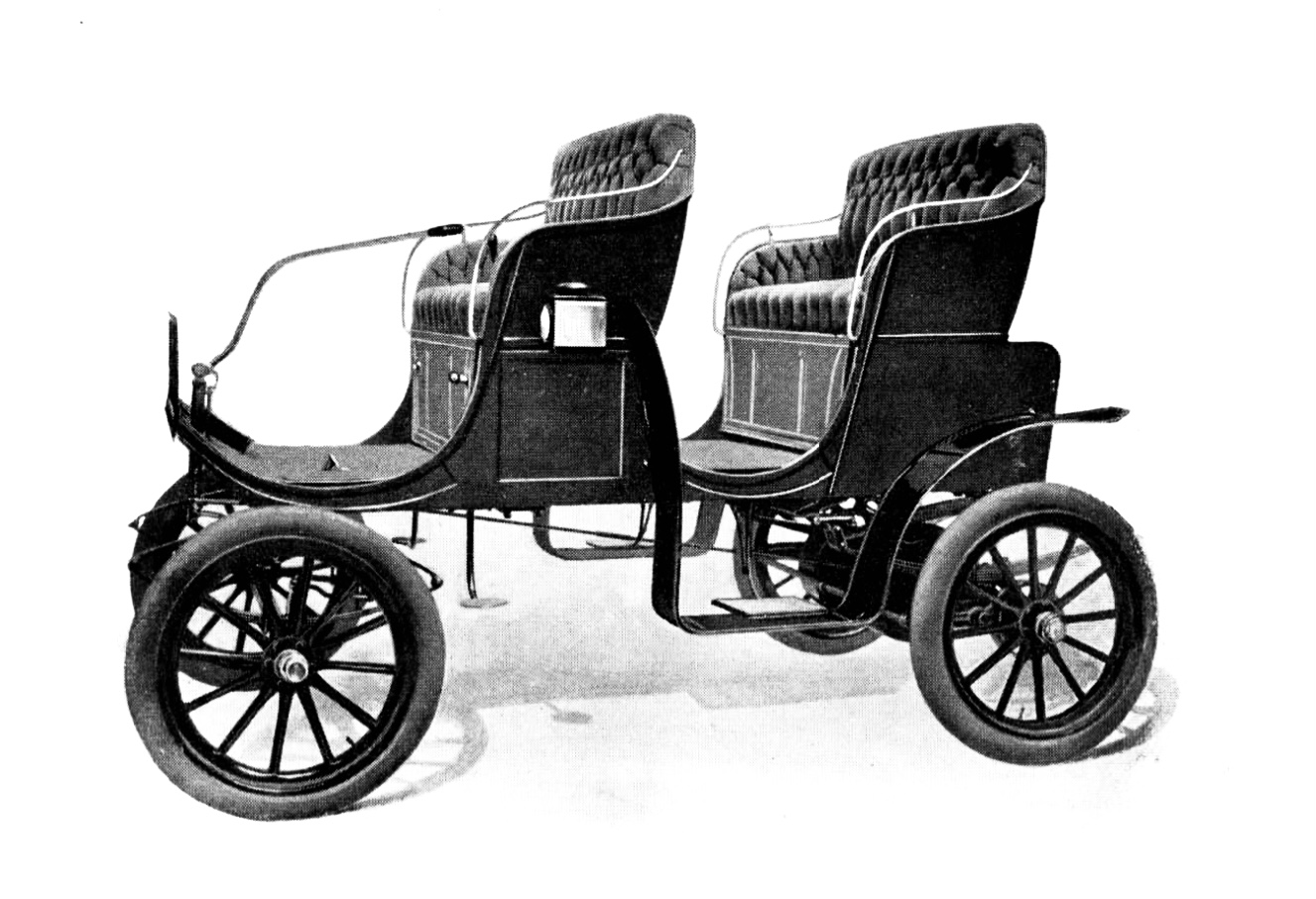
Waverley Model 20

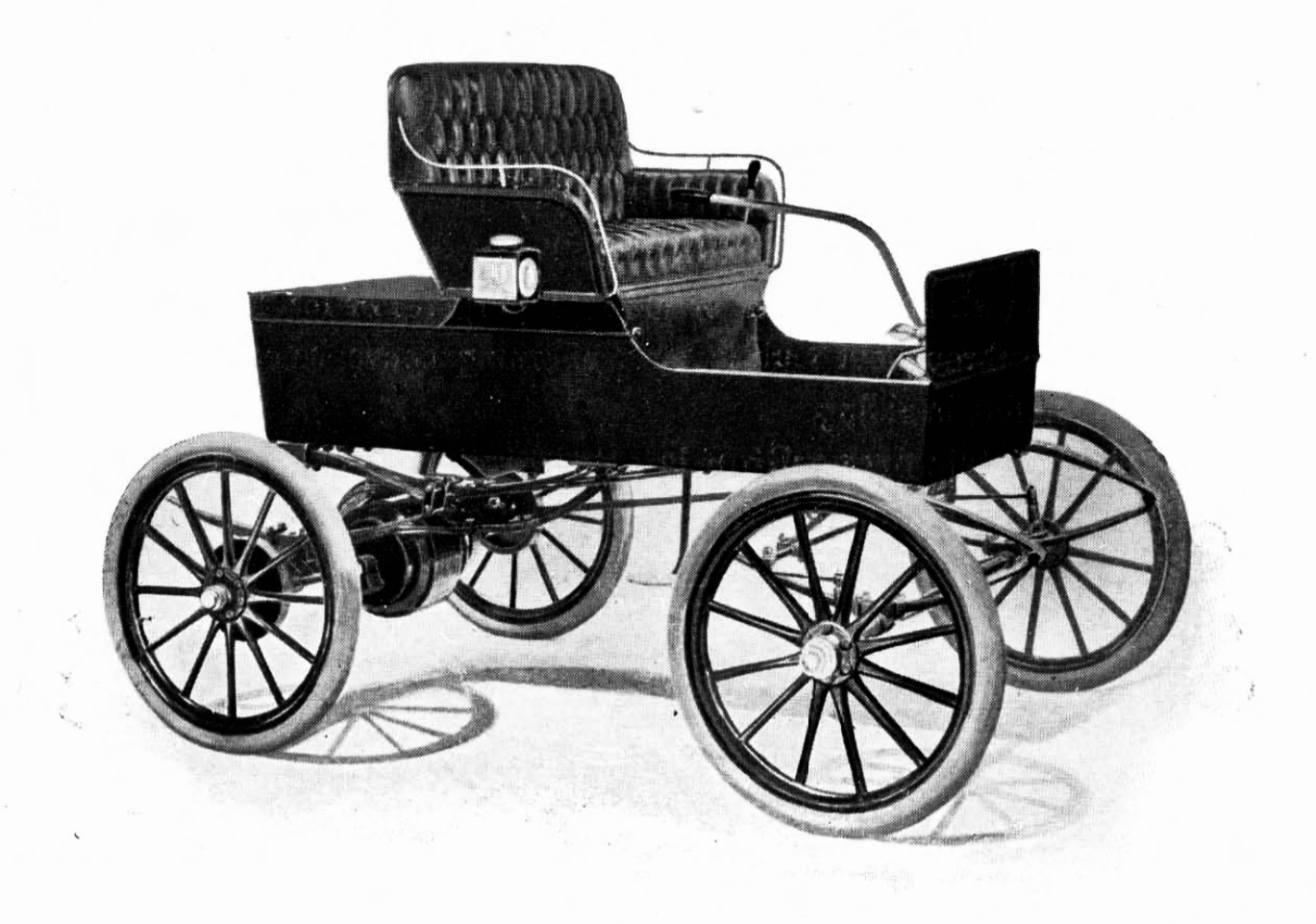
Waverley Model 21

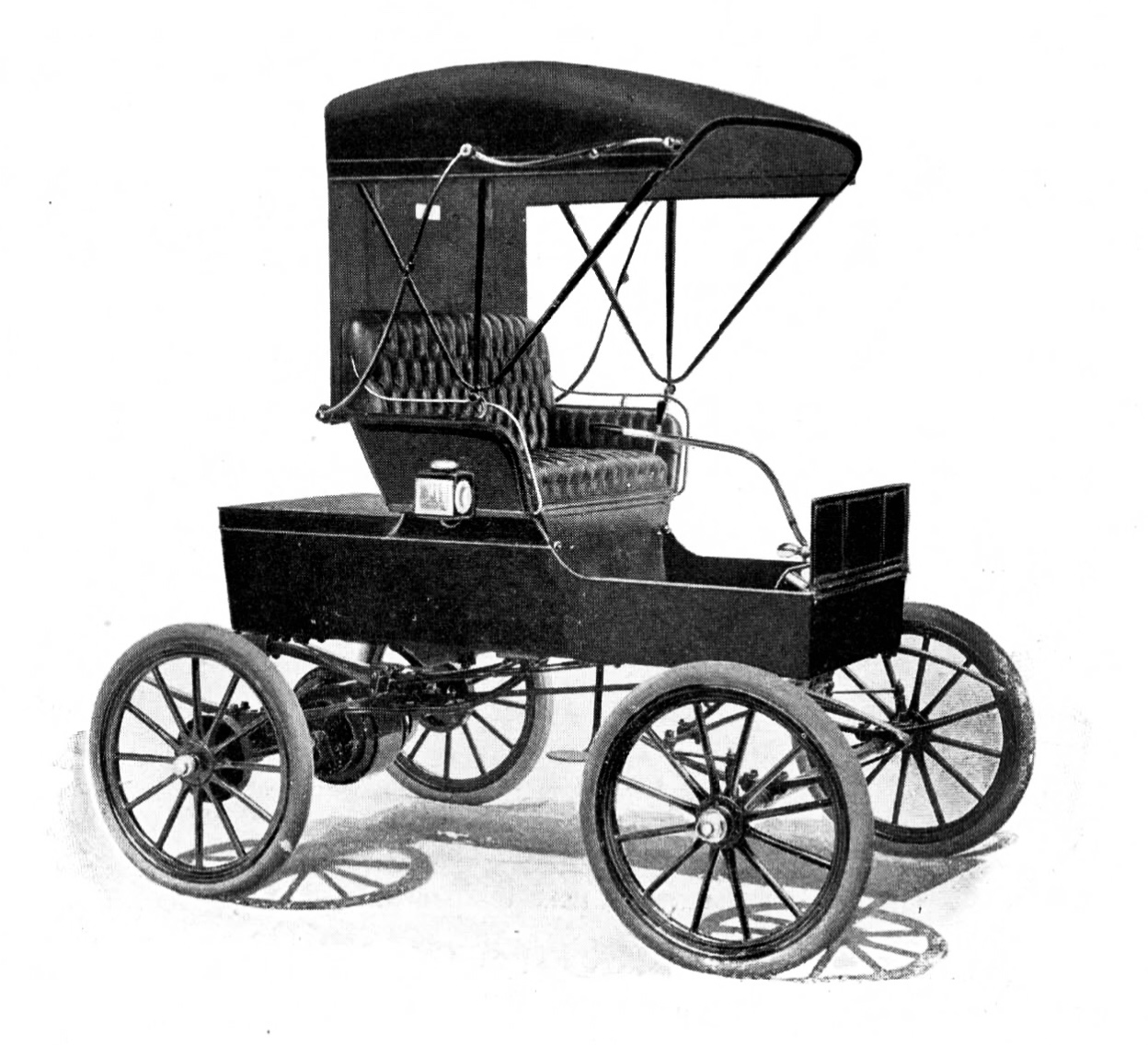
Waverley Model 22

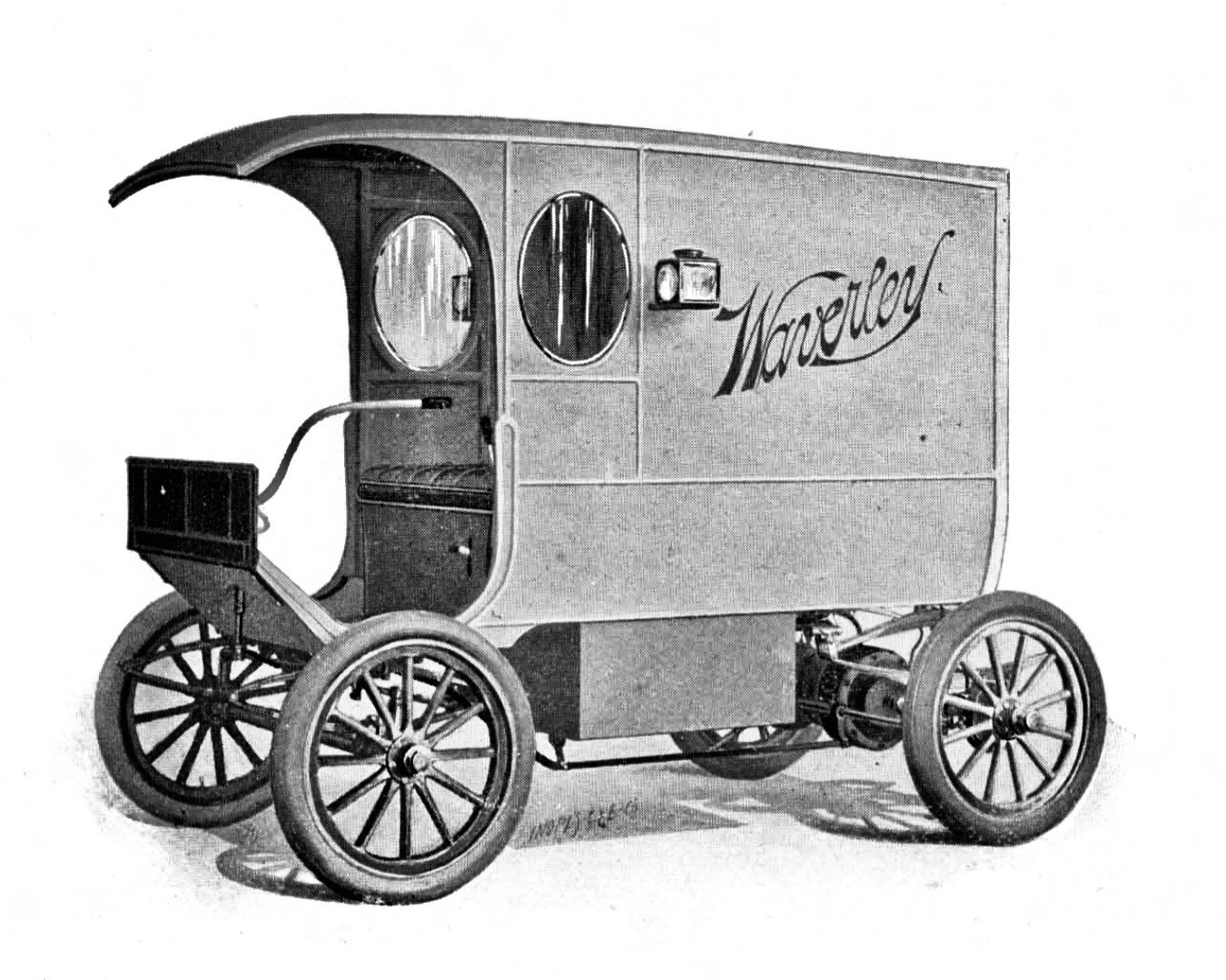
Waverley Model 23

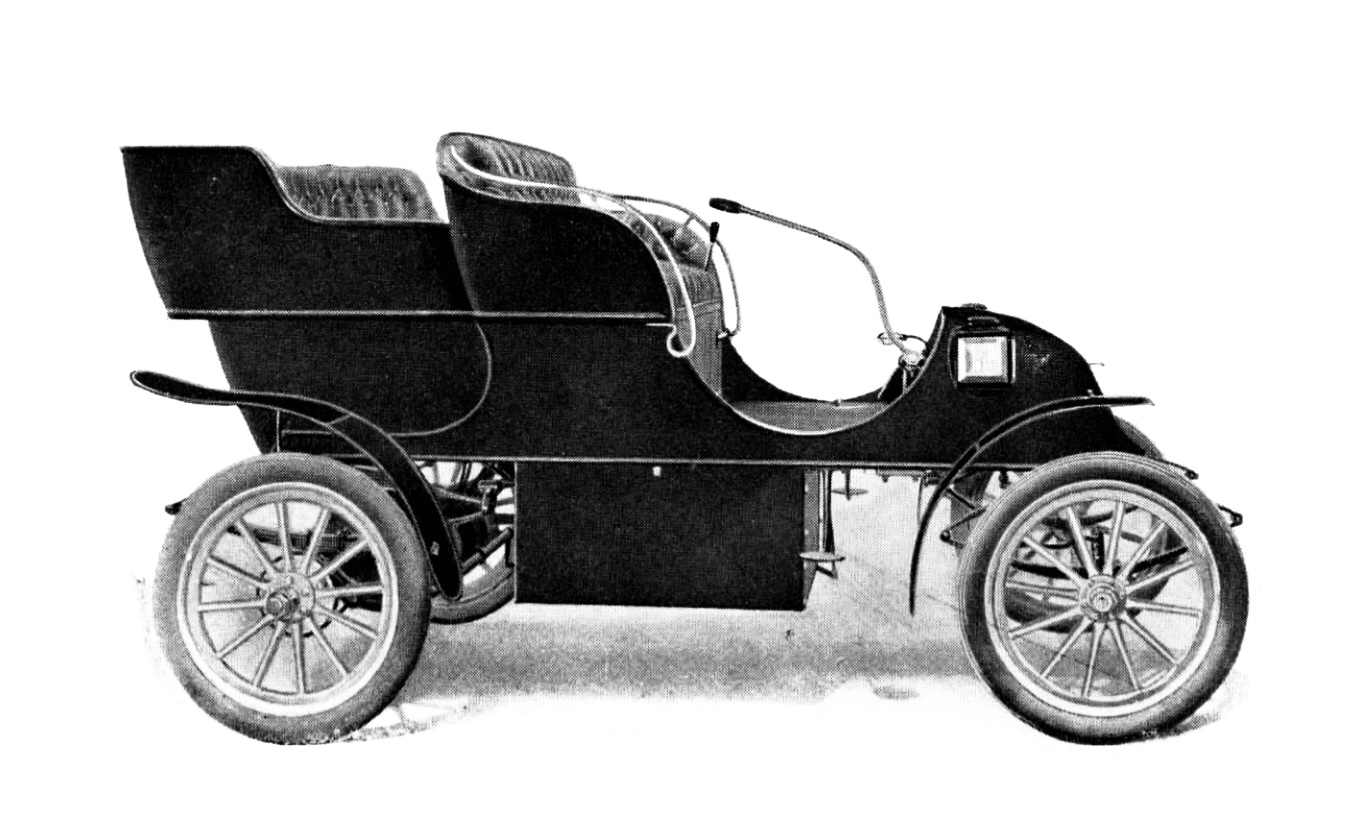
Waverley Model 25

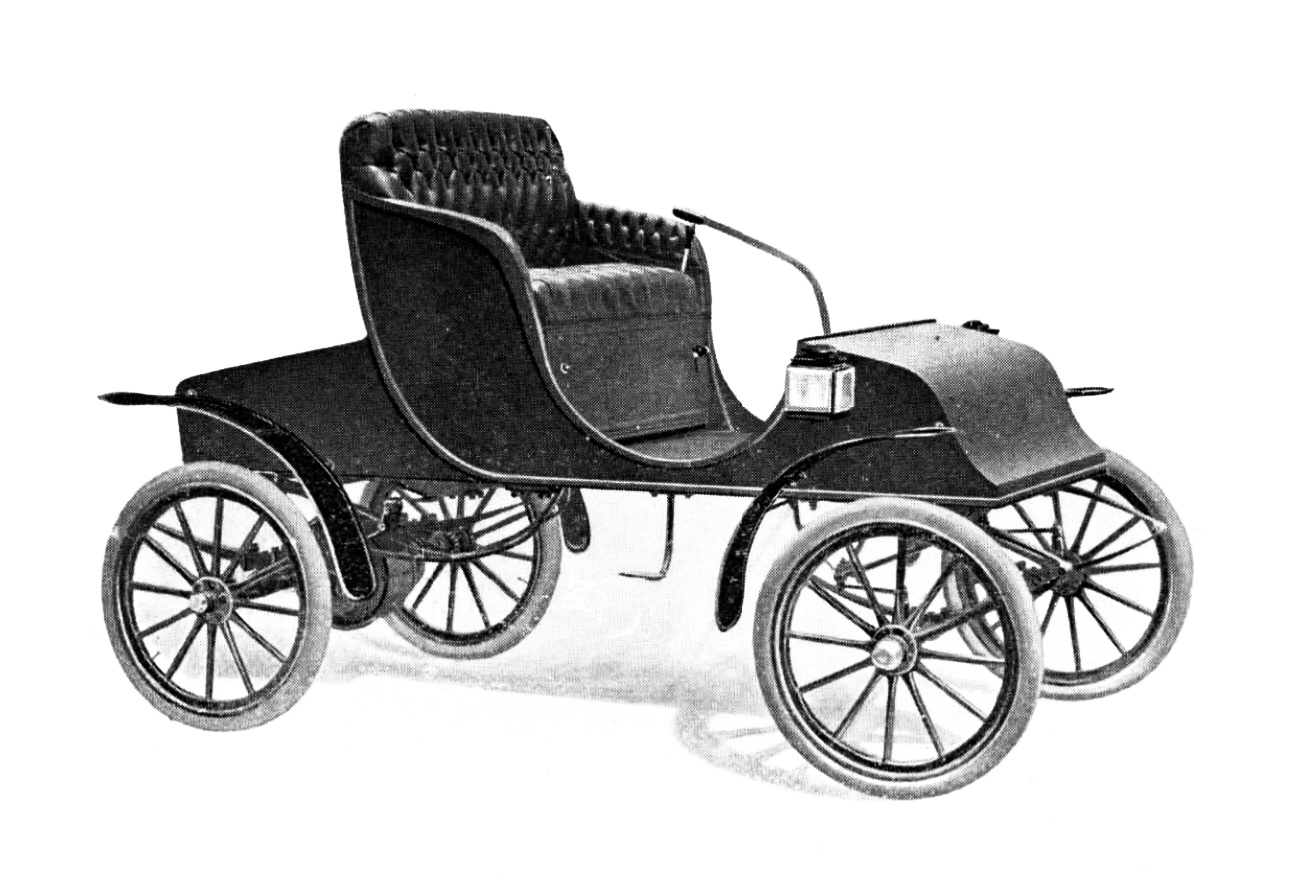
Waverley Model 26

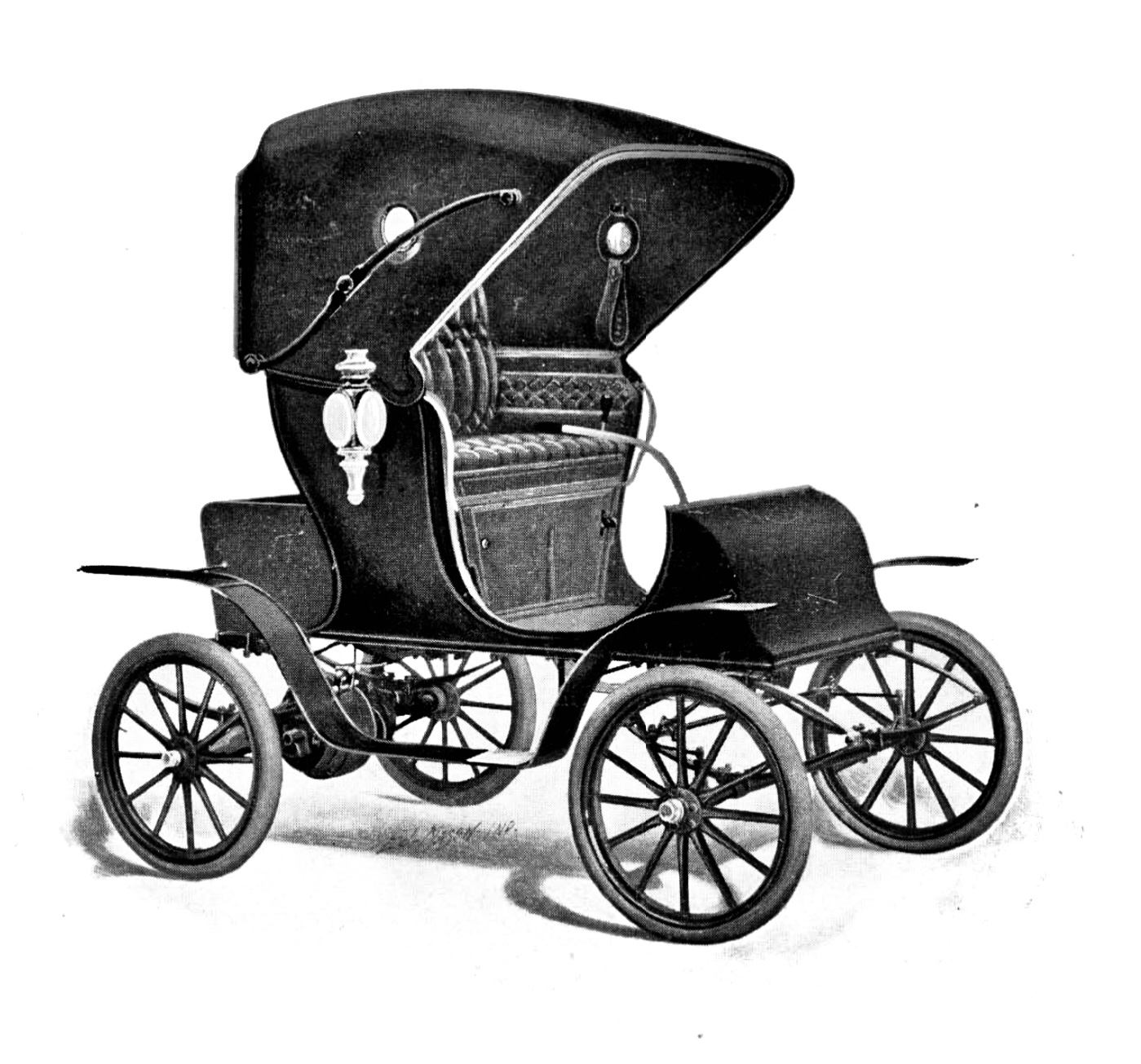
Waverley Model 27

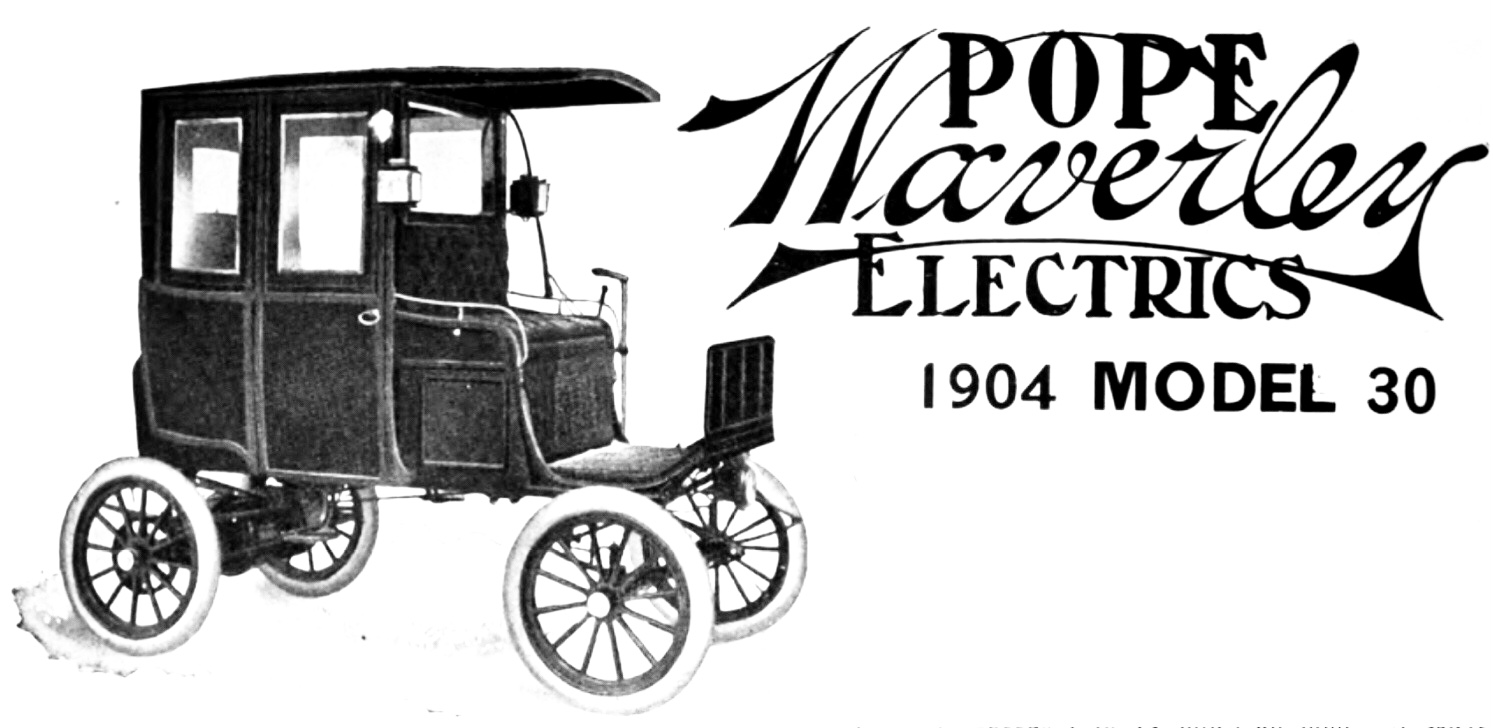
Waverley Model 30

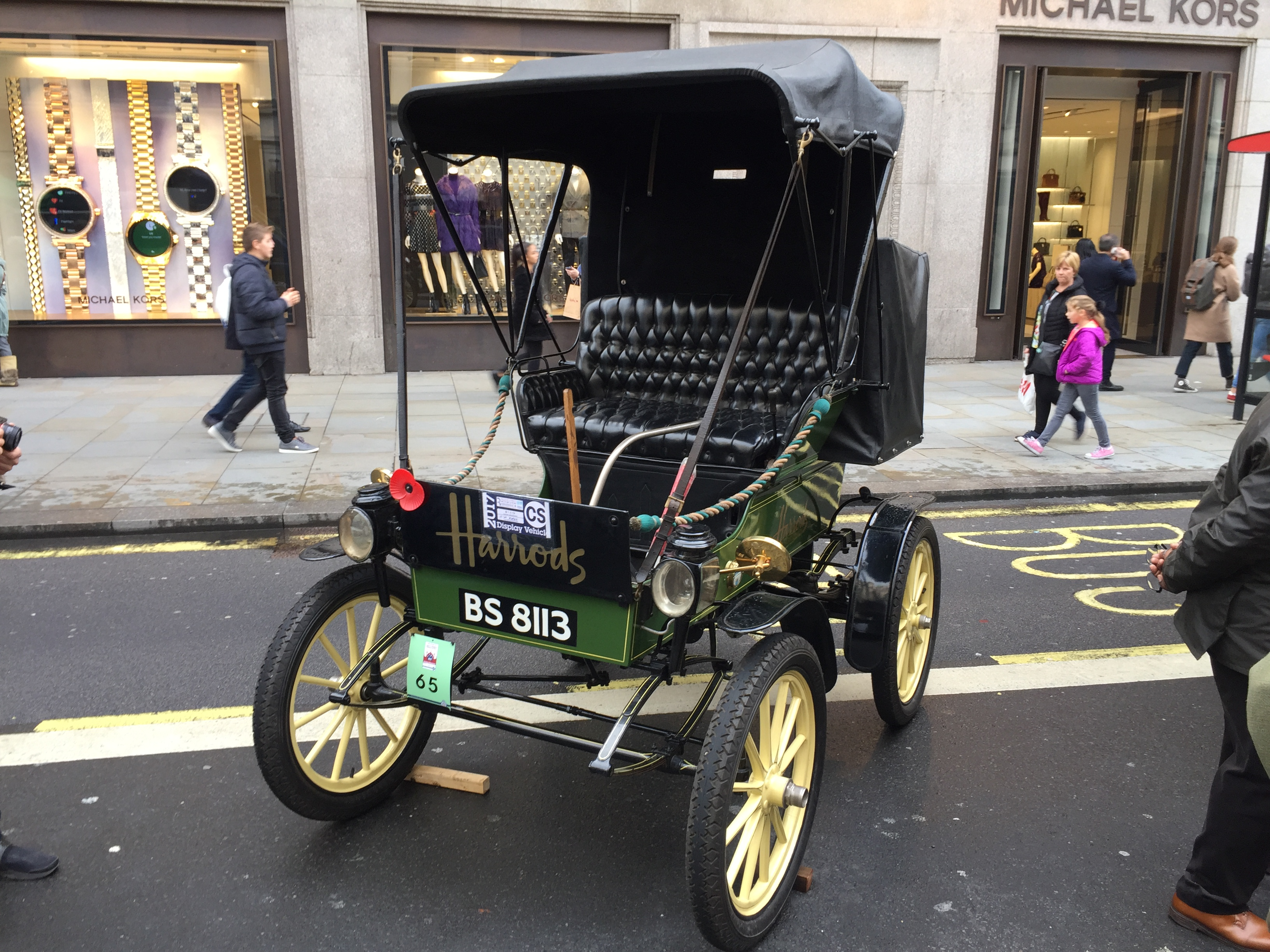
1901 Harrod's Waverley Electric

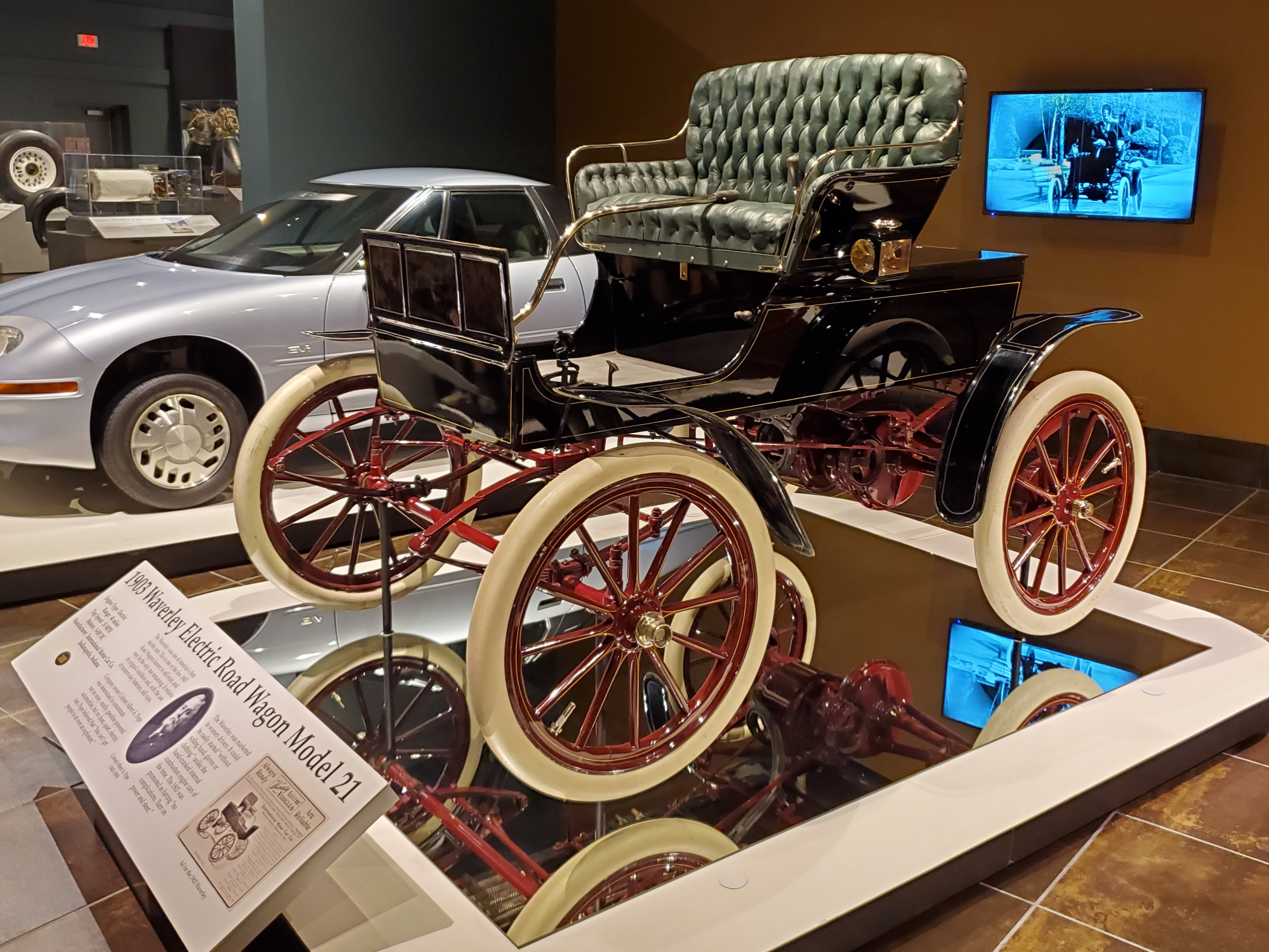
1903 Waverley Electric Model 21

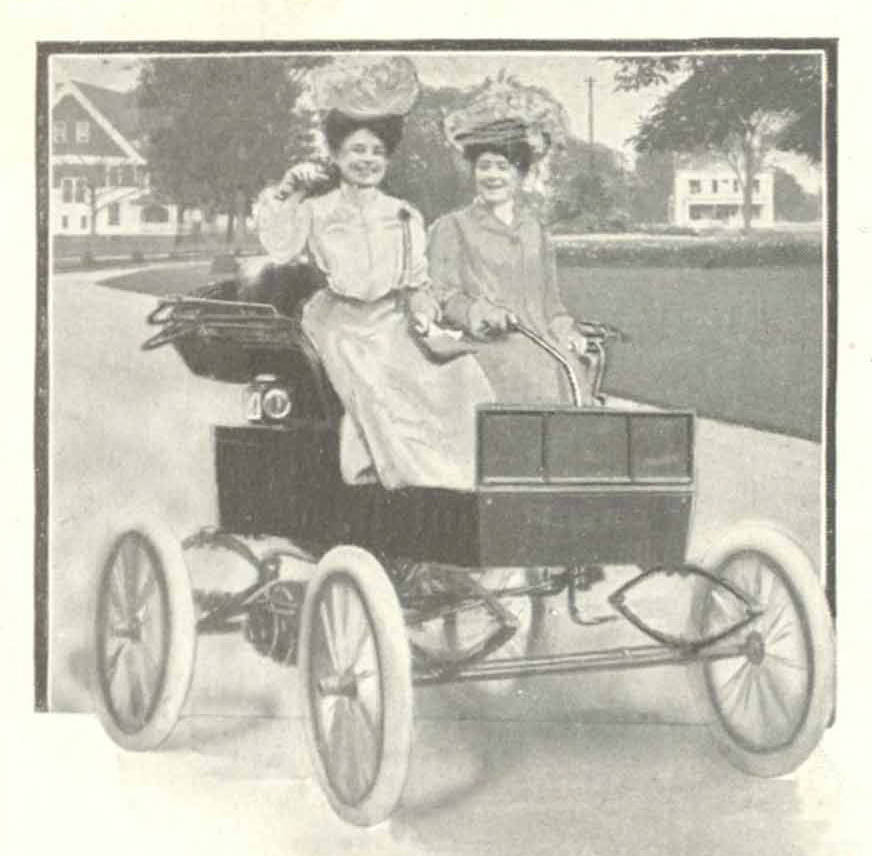
1905 Pope-Waverly Electric

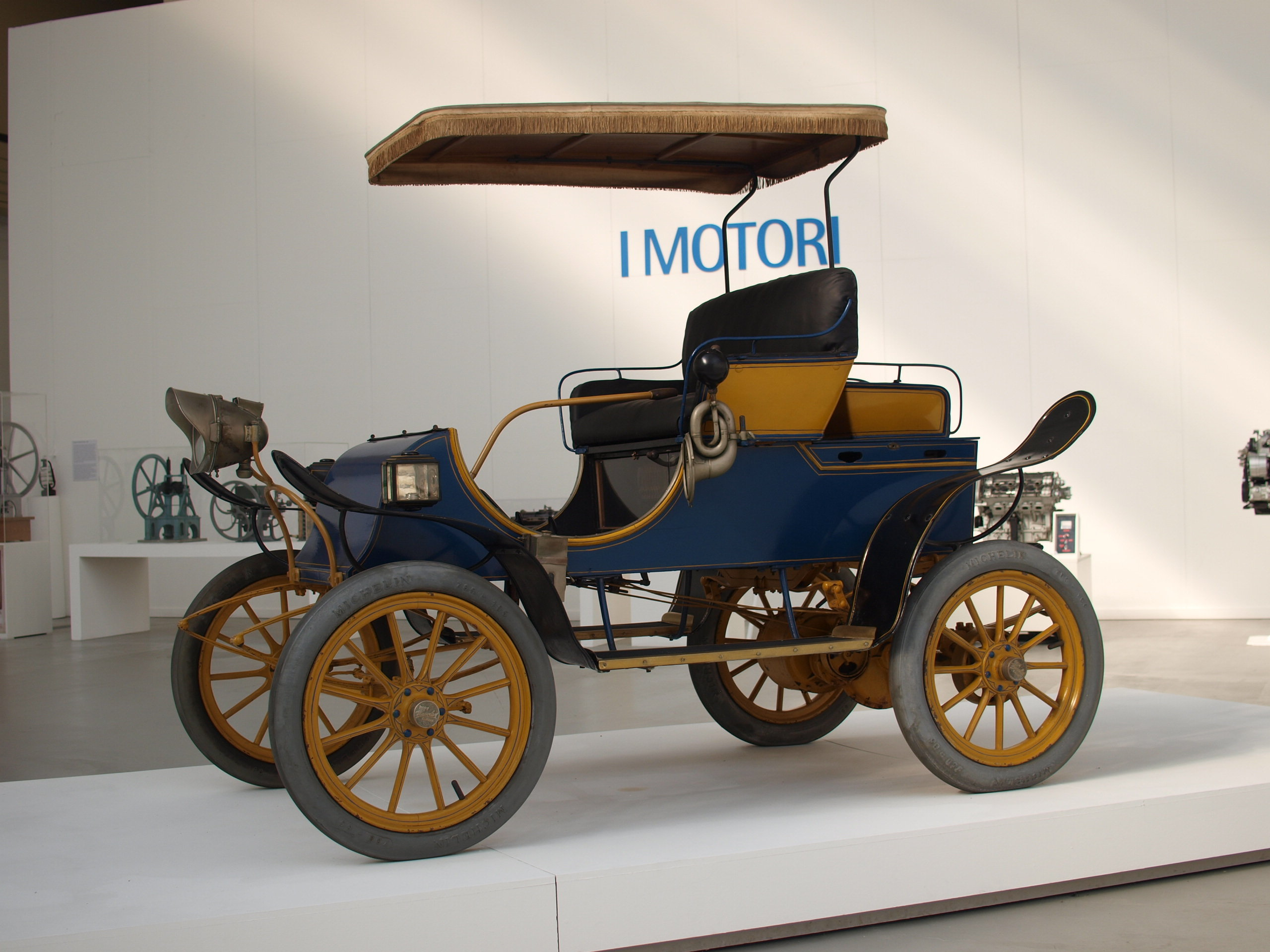
1907 Pope-Waverley Model 60C

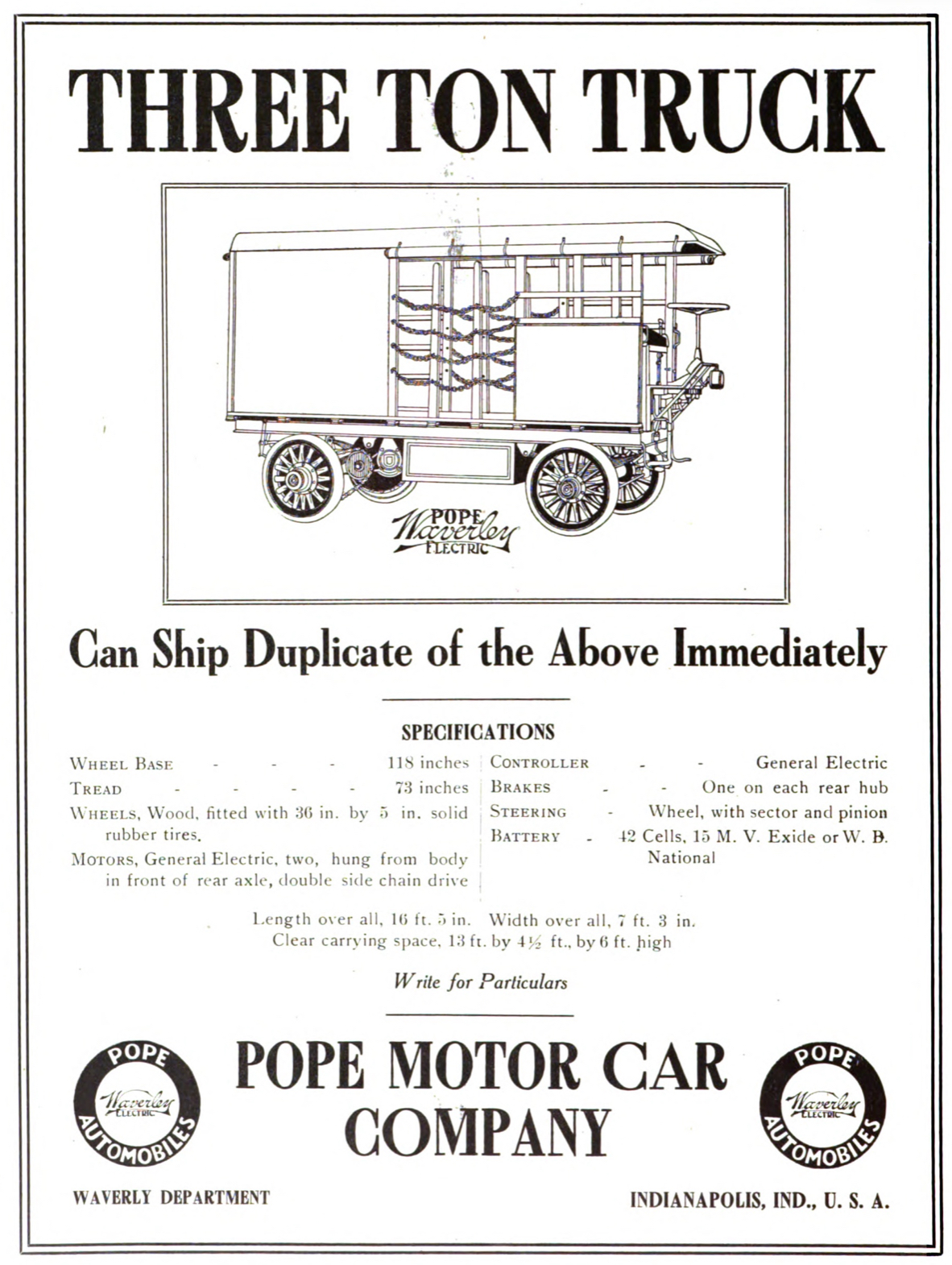
Pope-Waverley 3t (1906)

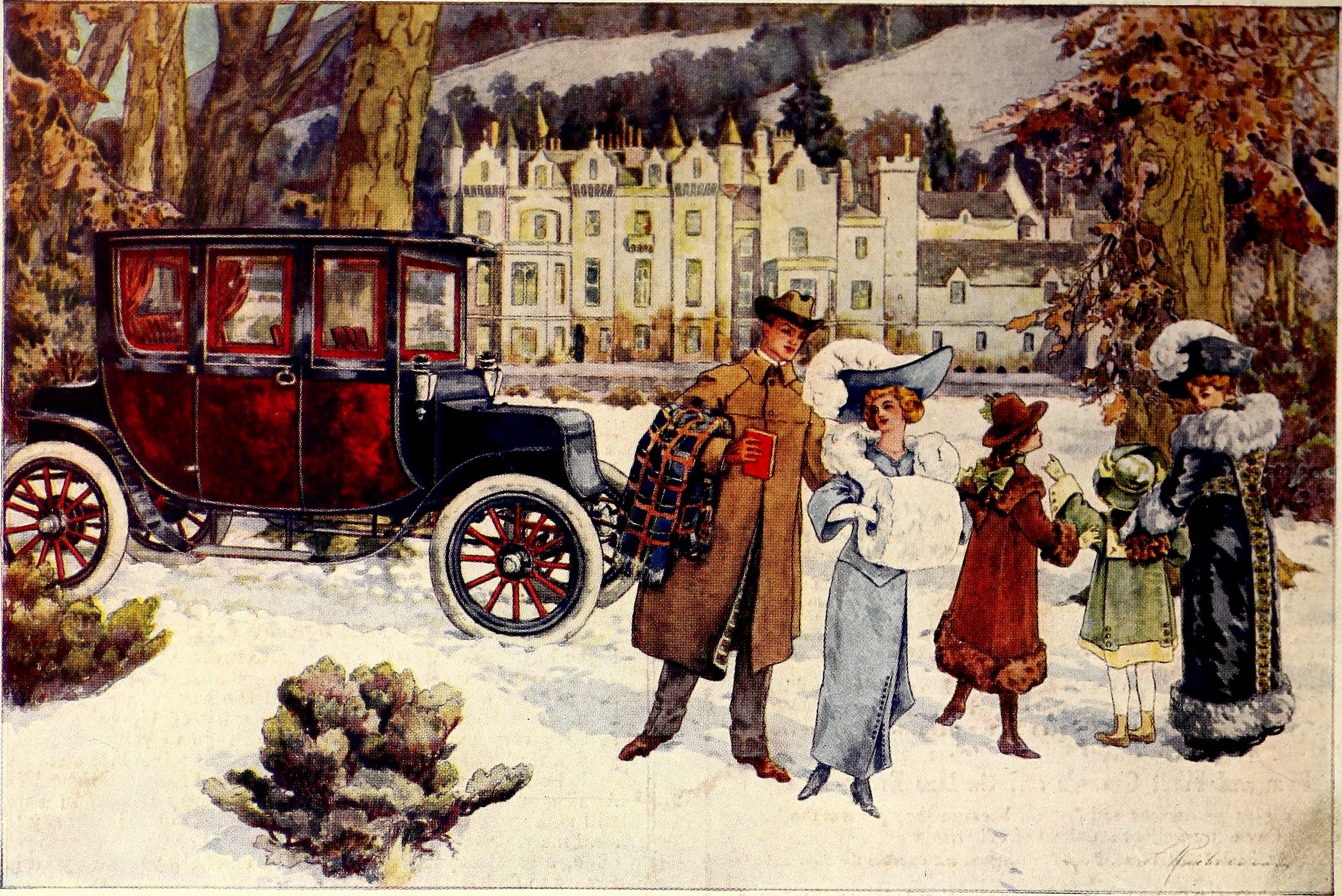
1912 Waverley in American Homes and Gardens Magazine

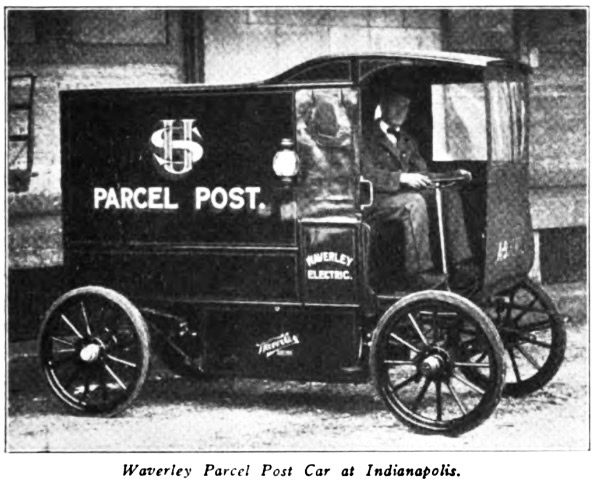
Waverley parcel post car (1916)

== See also ==
- Photo of ca. 1900 Waverly driven by Swan Turnblad at the Minnesota Historical Society.
- Frank Leslie's Popular Monthly (January, 1904)
- Pope-Waverly at ConceptCarz
- Video showcasing a 1901 Waverley Model 22
