= Waverley (novel) =

1814 historical novel by Walter Scott

Waverley; or, ’Tis Sixty Years Since
- First Edinburgh edition
- Author: Walter Scott
- Language: English, Lowland Scots; some Scottish Gaelic and French
- Series: Waverley novels
- Genre: Historical novel
- Set in: Scotland, 1745–46
- Publisher: Archibald Constable & Co. (Edinburgh); Longman, Hurst, Rees, Orme, and Brown (London)
- Publication date: 7 July 1814
- Publication place: Scotland
- Media type: Print
- Pages: 365 (Edinburgh Edition, 2007)
- Dewey Decimal: 823.7
- LC Class: PR5322 .W4
- Followed by: Guy Mannering

Waverley; or, ’Tis Sixty Years Since /ˈweɪvərli/ is a historical novel by Walter Scott (1771–1832). Scott was already famous as a poet, and chose to publish Waverley anonymously in 1814 as his first venture into prose fiction. It is often regarded as one of the first historical novels in the Western tradition.

Edward Waverley, a young English gentleman, is commissioned into a Scottish regiment shortly before the Jacobite rising of 1745. He goes on leave to visit a family friend, the Baron of Bradwardine, and is shocked to find that Bradwardine and his followers are supporters of Charles Edward Stuart, the exiled Jacobite prince. Waverley is forced to choose between his loyalty to the Crown and his admiration for the Jacobites' romantic cause. His gentlemanly actions gain him friends in this precarious situation, on both sides of the rising, who stand him in good stead when the Jacobites are eventually defeated.

Scott chose to publish his later novels as being "by the author of Waverley". In a letter shortly after publication, Scott writes: "I shall not own Waverley; my chief reason is that it would prevent me of the pleasure of writing again." His series of works on similar themes written during the same period have become collectively known as the "Waverley novels". The novel was well received by contemporary critics, and well liked by those who purchased novels in the early 19th century. It has continued in favour with later critics.

In 1818 Scott was granted a baronetcy, becoming Sir Walter Scott. It was an open secret that he was "the author of Waverley", and he admitted this at a public dinner in 1827.

== Composition and sources ==
Evidence about the composition of the first volume of Waverley is inconclusive, but it was probably begun in 1808 and laid aside, continued in 1810 and again laid aside, and eventually taken up and completed in the later part of 1813. The second and third volumes were written in the spring and early summer of 1814. Scott had an intimate acquaintance with Jacobite history, and Waverley draws on an extensive range of anecdotal and historical literary material. He had talked to people who had been involved in the 1745 uprising, or to those who had known them. He drew on the resources of his extensive library for relevant printed material. Among the most consistently helpful books were:

- John Home, The History of the Rebellion in the Year 1745 (1802)
- Edmund Burt, Letters from a Gentleman in the North of Scotland (1754)
- Donald Macintosh, A Collection of Gaelic Proverbs, and Familiar Phrases (1785).

== Editions ==
The first edition of Waverley, in three volumes, consisting of 1,000 copies, was published in Edinburgh on 7 July 1814 by Archibald Constable and Co. and in London later in the month by Longman, Hurst, Rees, Orme, and Brown. As with all the Waverley novels before 1827, publication was anonymous. The price was one guinea (£1.05). The first edition was followed by two further editions, together comprising 4,000 copies, in the same year, with small authorial revisions, and by several more editions extending into the early 1820s: Scott was involved in at least one of these, the sixth edition of 1816. In early 1826 Scott returned to Waverley, revising the text and writing an introduction and notes for a complete edition of the Waverley novels: this took some time to materialise after the 1826 financial crash, but eventually the novel appeared as the first and second volumes of the "Magnum" edition in June and July 1829.

The first critical edition, by Claire Lamont, was published by the Clarendon Press, Oxford, in 1981. The standard edition is now that edited by P. D. Garside in 2007, as the first volume of the Edinburgh Edition of the Waverley Novels: this is based on the first edition with emendations to restore authorial readings from the manuscript and the second and third editions. The new Magnum material is included in Volume 25a.

== Plot ==
=== Background ===
It is the time of the Jacobite uprising of 1745 which sought to restore the Stuart dynasty in the person of Charles Edward Stuart, known as "Bonnie Prince Charlie". A young English dreamer and soldier, Edward Waverley, is sent to Scotland that year. He journeys north from his aristocratic family home, Waverley-Honour, in the south of England, first to the Scottish Lowlands and the home of family friend Baron Bradwardine, then into the Highlands and the heart of the rebellion and its aftermath.

=== Plot summary ===
Edward is at ease in the family estate owned by his uncle, Sir Everard Waverley, who maintains the family's traditional Tory and Jacobite sympathies. He spends time with his parents as well, though less time after his mother dies when he is about 12 or 13 years old. His Whig father works for the Hanoverian government in nearby Westminster. Edward has a sense of his honour, but he starts life with no political affiliation. Edward is given a commission in the Hanoverian army by his father and posted to Dundee. After some military training, he takes leave to visit the Baron of Bradwardine, a friend of his uncle, and meets the baron's lovely daughter Rose.

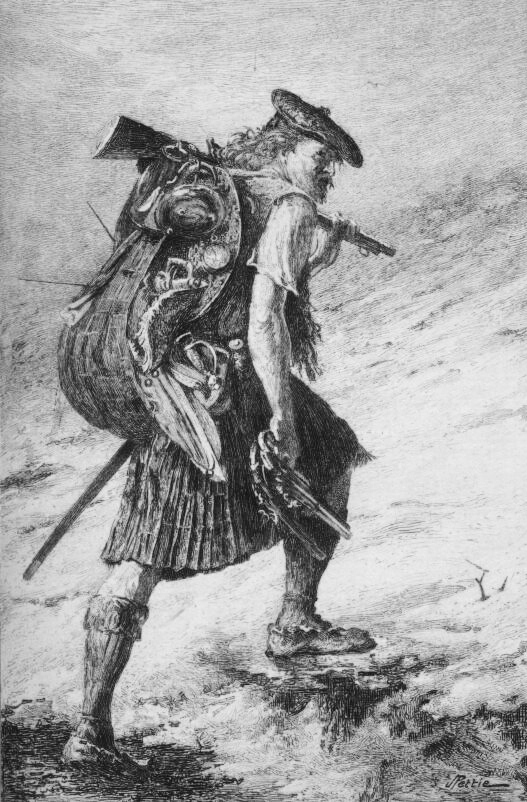
Disbanded, Waverley in Highland garb, illustration to 1893 edition, by J Pettie

When Highlanders visit Bradwardine's castle, Edward is intrigued and goes to the mountain lair of the Clan Mac-Ivor, meeting the Chieftain Fergus and his sister Flora, who turn out to be active Jacobites preparing for the insurrection. Edward has overstayed his leave and is accused of desertion and treason, then arrested. The Highlanders rescue him from his escort and take him to the Jacobite stronghold at Doune Castle, then on to Holyrood Palace, where he meets Bonnie Prince Charlie, with whom he is charmed.

Encouraged by the beautiful Flora Mac-Ivor, Edward goes over to the Jacobite cause and takes part in the Battle of Prestonpans of September 1745. The battle is recounted in some detail. Undaunted by the light, inaccurate guns, the Highlander army continues its charge; however, the centre becomes bogged down in marshy land, and in driving forward the men's different speeds of advance cause them to form into a "V". One of the soldiers who tumbles into the marsh is the Hanoverian Colonel Talbot, whom Waverley picks up on his horse, saving his life. This man is a close friend of his Waverley uncle. Edward gets separated from Fergus and both their bands in one battle that the government troops were winning. Edward finds local people who take him in until he can leave safely after events are calmer and the snows are gone. He sees a newspaper that informs him that his father has died, so he heads to London.

When the Jacobite cause fails in 1746, Talbot intervenes to get Edward a pardon. Edward visits the decrepit estate of Baron Bradwardine, attacked by soldiers. After making contact with the baron, he asks for his daughter's hand in marriage, and soon is the established lover of Rose. The baron is also pardoned. Edward seeks Flora the day before her brother's trial; she plans to join a convent in France. Edward then attends the trial in Carlisle at which Fergus Mac-Ivor is condemned to death, and is with him in the hours before his execution. Edward then returns to his uncle and aunt on the Waverley Honour and begins preparations for their wedding and also to make the legal appearances to assure the pardons of Edward and his future father-in-law. The Talbots restore the Baron's estate, taken from him for his Jacobite activities, and repair it completely, restored to the original appearance with Bradwardine's family crests. The Talbots bought their own estate near Waverley Honour, while the Baron's family estate is restored to his ownership by Edward Waverley, using the funds from selling his late father's home.

== Characters ==
Principal characters in bold

- Sir Everard Waverley, of Waverley-Honour
- Richard, his brother
- Rachael, his sister
- **Edward**, his nephew
- Mr Samuel Pembroke, his chaplain
- Serjeant Humphrey Houghton, Edward's subordinate
- John Hodges, another subordinate
- Miss Cæcilia Stubbs, a beauty
- Colonel Gardiner, Edward's commanding officer
- **Cosmo Comyne Bradwardine**, of Bradwardine and Tully-Veolan
- **Rose**, his daughter
- Bailie Duncan Macwheeeble, his steward
- Alexander Saunderson, his butler
- David Gellatley, his half-wit servant
- Janet, Gellatley's mother
- Mr Falconer, laird of Balmawhapple
- Mr Bullsegg, laird of Killancureit
- Mr Rubrick, a nonjuring clergyman
- **Fergus Mac-Ivor**, a Highland chieftain
- **Flora**, his sister
- Callum Beg, his page
- Evan Dhu Maccombich, his lieutenant
- Mrs Flockhart, his Edinburgh landlady
- Donald Bean Lean, a freebooter (also as Ruthven and Ruffin)
- Alice, his daughter
- Ebenezer Cruickshanks, an innkeeper
- John Mucklewrath, a blacksmith
- Mrs Mucklewrath, his wife
- Mr Morton, a minister
- Major Melville, a Justice of the Peace
- Mr Habakkuk Gilfillan, a Cameronian leader
- Colonel Donald Stewart, governor of Doune Castle
- Charles Edward, the Young Pretender
- **Colonel Talbot**
- Lady Emily Blandeville, his wife
- Mrs Nosebag, a military wife

== Chapter summary ==
Volume One

Ch. 1 Introductory: The author introduces his work to the reader.

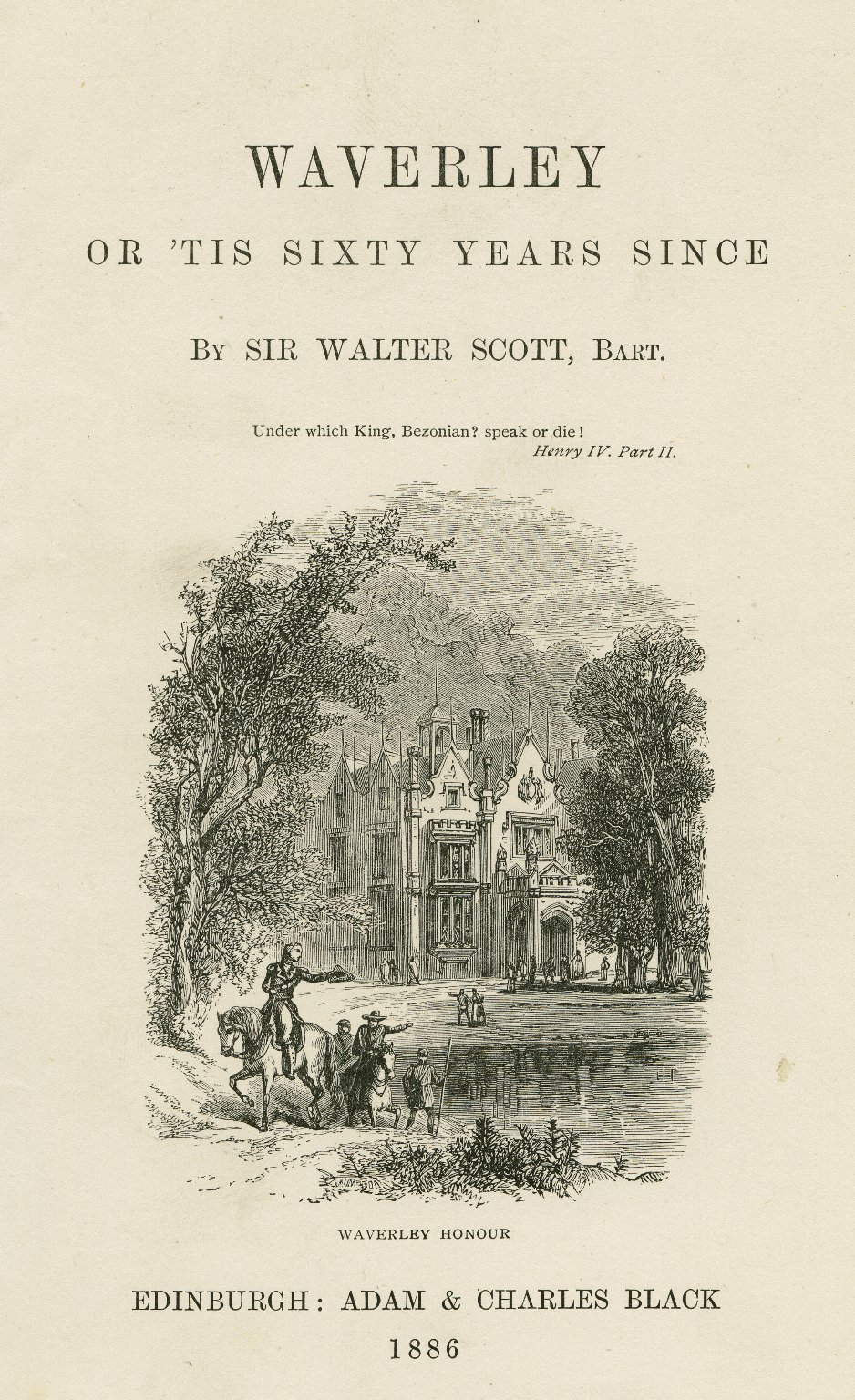
Depicts Edward Waverley leaving his father's home of Waverley Honour on horseback (Waverley, ch. 2)

Ch. 2 Waverley Honour.—A Retrospect: Edward Waverley's father Richard defects to the Whigs, which almost leads his older brother Sir Everard, a confirmed Tory and bachelor, to disinherit him and his family, but he has second thoughts and warms to Edward as a young boy.

Ch. 3 Education: Transferred to Sir Everard's seat, Waverley-Honour, to be educated by his chaplain Mr Pembroke, Edward is allowed to follow a lively but undisciplined course of reading which stimulates his imagination rather than benefiting his understanding.

Ch. 4 Castle-building: The adolescent Edward is induced by stories of family history told by his aunt Rachael to indulge in fanciful meditation.

Ch. 5 Choice of a Profession: To prevent Edward succumbing to the charms of a local beauty Miss Cæcilia Stubbs, Rachael sets in train negotiations which result in his receiving an army commission. The author apologises for the lengthy but necessary introductory chapters.

Ch. 6 The Adieus of Waverley: Sir Everard gives Edward a letter of introduction to Cosmo Bradwardine, Baron of Tully-Veolan, whom he had befriended after the 1715 uprising, and Mr Pembroke saddles him with a voluminous set of his manuscript sermons.

Ch. 7 A Horse-quarter in Scotland: Edward finds military life in Angus boring and obtains from his commanding officer Colonel G——— a few weeks' leave of absence to make an excursion.

Ch. 8 A Scottish Manor House Sixty Years Since: Edward arrives at the hamlet and estate of Tully-Veolan.

Ch. 9 More of the Manor House and its Environs: Edward encounters a half-wit servant David Gellatley who introduces him to the butler.

Ch. 10 Rose Bradwardine and her Father: Edward encounters Rose Bradwardine and her father, who gives an account of four guests expected for dinner.

Ch. 11 The Banquet: After a bibulous meal Balmawhapple insults Edward at the local inn.

Ch. 12 Repentance, and a Reconciliation: Bradwardine reconciles Edward and an apologetic Balmawhapple. Rose tells Gellatley's story.

Ch. 13 A More Rational Day than the Last: After hunting with Bradwardine, Edward is entertained by Rose, who tells how Gellatley's mother Janet had been regarded as a witch.

Ch. 14 A Discovery—Waverley becomes Domesticated at Tully-Veolan: Prompted by Gellatley, Edward discovers that Bradwardine has fought Balmawhapple on his behalf. Rose is increasingly attracted by Edward.

Ch. 15 A Creagh, and its Consequences: Some six weeks into Edward's stay the Tully-Veolan cattle are stolen, Bradwardine having refused to continue paying 'black-mail' to Fergus Mac-Ivor.

Ch. 16 An Unexpected Ally Appears: Evan Dhu Maccombich arrives from Fergus to make peace, and Edward sets out with him to experience the Highlands.

Ch. 17 The Hold of a Highland Robber: Edward is entertained in Donald Bean Lean's cave.

Ch. 18 Waverley Proceeds on his Journey: In the morning Donald's daughter Alice tends Edward before Evan takes him on to meet Fergus.

Ch. 19 The Chief and his Mansion: The narrator provides a sketch of Fergus, who escorts Edward to his house of Glennaquoich.

Ch. 20 A Highland Feast: Edward participates in a substantial meal with the clan Mac-Ivor.

Ch. 21 The Chieftain's Sister: The narrator provides a sketch of Fergus's sister Flora.

Ch. 22 Highland Minstrelsy: Flora explains Highland minstrelsy to Edward and sings a song to a harp by a waterfall.

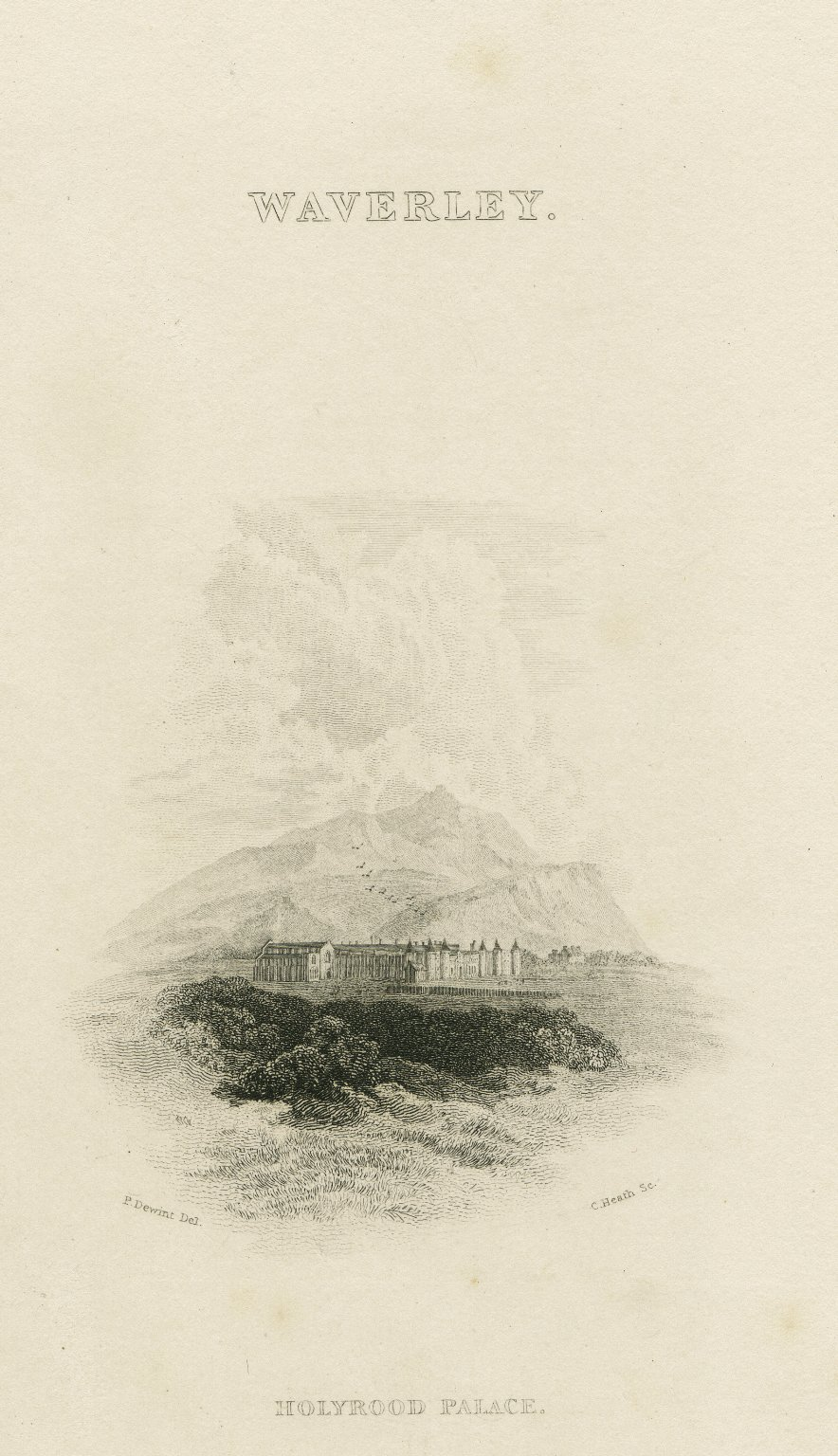
Steel engraving by C. Heath after a drawing by P. De Wint of a scene relating to Scott's novel Waverley. 1832. The University of Edinburgh Collections

Ch. 23 Waverley Continues at Glennaquoich: Flora expresses to Edward her view of Bradwardine and Rose.

Volume Two

Ch. 1 (24) A Stag-Hunting and its Consequences: Edward is injured during a stag-hunt and recuperates for a week before returning to Glennaquoich.

Ch. 2 (25) News from England: Letters from England inform Edward that his father has engaged in political intrigue and been dismissed from government service. He also receives a peremptory note from Colonel G——— demanding his immediate return, to which he responds by resigning his commission. After showing Edward a newspaper report of his replacement as captain, Fergus indicates that he can help him to be revenged for the injustice.

Ch. 3 (26) An Eclaircissement: After expressing reservations about Edward joining the Jacobites, Flora asks for an hour to consider his profession of love for her.

Ch. 4 (27) Upon the Same Subject: Flora indicates to Edward that she can never fulfil his idea of domestic happiness and urges him to return to England.

Ch. 5 (28) A Letter from Tully-Veolan: Gellatley delivers a letter from Rose warning Edward that a search for him is under way. He decides to go to Edinburgh to justify his conduct.

Ch. 6 (29) Waverley's Reception in the Lowlands after his Highland Tour: Callum Beg escorts Edward to the Lowlands. Before an innkeeper Ebenezer Cruickshanks takes over as guide, Callum gives Edward a letter from Fergus enclosing a poem by Flora on the grave of an English captain.

Ch. 7 (30) Shows that the Loss of a Horse's Shoe may be a Serious Inconvenience: A political altercation between a blacksmith Micklewrath and his wife results in Edward being suspected of Jacobite allegiance; he shoots in self-defence, wounding the smith.

Ch. 8 (31) An Examination: Edward is examined by the Justice of the Peace Major Mellville, with Mr Morton the minister; the case against him mounts up, including evidence that by means of an agent he had tempted his compatriot Sergeant Houghton to desert to the Jacobite cause.

Ch. 9 (32) A Conference, and the Consequences: Morton and Mellville discuss Edward's case, and the Colonel decides to ask the Cameronian Gilfillan to escort him to Stirling.

Ch. 10 (33) A Confidant: Morton encourages Edward and gives him information about Gilfillan.

Ch. 11 (34) Things Mend a Little: Edward shares an increasingly relaxed meal with Mellville and Morton which is interrupted by the sound of Gilfillan's drum.

Ch. 12 (35) A Volunteer Sixty Years Since: Edward is entrusted to Gilfillan.

Ch. 13 (36) An Incident: Gilfillan's band is joined by a (pretended) pedlar whose whistle prompts eight Highlanders to rescue Edward.

Ch. 14 (37) Waverley is Still in Duresse: Edward is tended in a hut by Janet and a mysterious female. Alice Bean Lean draws his attention as she puts a packet in his portmanteau.

Ch. 15 (38) A Nocturnal Adventure: After passing English troops, Edward is conducted to Doune Castle.

Ch. 16 (39) The Journey is Continued: Edward is conducted to Edinburgh by a party under Balmawhapple.

Ch. 17 (40) An Old and a New Acquaintance: Fergus introduces Edward to Prince Charles, to whom he gives his allegiance.

Ch. 18 (41) The Mystery Begins to be Cleared Up: Fergus tells Edward he is sure that the apparent pedlar in Ch. 36 was Donald Bean Lean. They are joined by Bradwardine.

Ch. 19 (42) A Soldier's Dinner: Edward is provided with a tartan outfit. Fergus, Bradwardine, and Macwheeble discuss the forthcoming battle.

Ch. 20 (43) The Ball: On the eve of battle Edward is encouraged by Charles in his pursuit of Flora and impresses her with his spirited conduct at the ball.

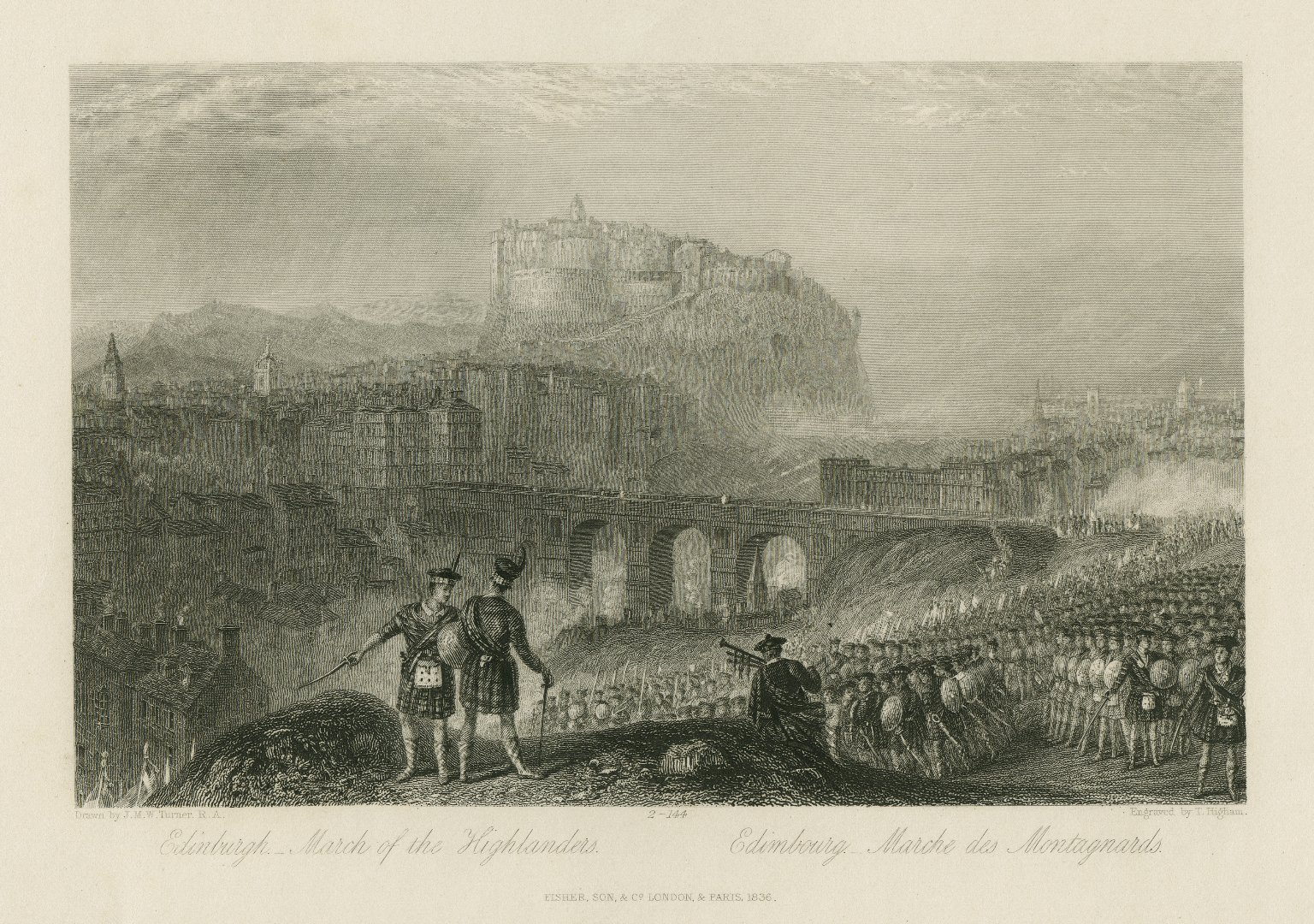
Steel engraving of a scene from Scott's novel Waverley by T. Higham after a drawing by J. M. W. Turner of a scene from Walter Scott's novel Waverley

Ch. 21 (44) The March: Edward observes the assembled Jacobite forces at Holyrood.

Ch. 22 (45) An Incident Gives Rise to Unavailing Reflections: Edward encounters the mortally wounded Houghton, who has been reduced to the ranks.

Ch. 23 (46) The Eve of Battle: Edward, though tormented by the thought that he is a traitor, joins in the preparations for battle.

Ch. 24 (47) The Conflict: During the battle of Prestonpans Edward accepts the surrender of Colonel Talbot and sees Colonel G——— fall; Balmawhapple is also killed.

Volume Three

Ch. 1 (48) An Unexpected Embarrassment: Bradwardine is worried he may not be able to carry out his feudal duty of taking off Charles's boots since he wears brogues, but he finds a pedantic solution.

Ch. 2 (49) The English Prisoner: Talbot reproaches Edward for his defection.

Ch. 3 (50) Rather Unimportant: Committed by Charles to Edward's care, Talbot agrees not to attempt to escape without his knowledge.

Ch. 4 (51) Intrigues of Love and Politics: Edward examines the packet in his portmanteau which contains earlier letters from Colonel G——— requesting his return from the Highlands. Further details provided by John Hodges (amplified by the narrator) make clear Donald Bean Lean's role in pretending to be Edward's agent as the pedlar Ruthven or Ruffen.

Ch. 5 (52) Intrigues of Society and Love: Edward gets to know the manly but prejudiced Talbot better and is increasingly attracted by Rose. Flora tells Rose that Edward is destined to domestic tranquillity.

Ch. 6 (53) Fergus, a Suitor: Fergus informs Edward that he intended to marry Rose, but that Charles has indicated her affections are engaged elsewhere.

Ch. 7 (54) "To One Thing Constant Never": Flora uses a reading of Romeo and Juliet to direct Edward towards Rose rather than herself.

Ch. 8 (55) A Brave Man in Sorrow: Edward learns from Talbot that his wife, distressed by the news from Scotland, has lost her baby and is seriously ill.

Ch. 9 (56) Exertion: Edward presents Talbot with a pass from Charles to proceed to England.

Ch. 10 (57) The March: As the Jacobite army marches south Fergus expresses his anger at Edward's rejection of Flora.

Ch. 11 (58) The Confusion of King Agramant's Camp: Callum fires at Edward, who he thinks has insulted the clan, and is struck senseless by Fergus. Fergus instigates a duel with Edward, but Charles interrupts them and explains that he had mistakenly taken Edward to be Rose's accepted lover.

Ch. 12 (59) A Skirmish: In Cumberland, Fergus tells Edward that he has seen the Bodach glas, a spirit foretelling his own imminent death. Their party is defeated in a skirmish.

Ch. 13 (60) A Chapter of Accidents: Edward is given shelter by a farmer near Ullswater.

Ch. 14 (61) A Journey to London: Learning from a newspaper of his father's death and of Sir Everard's impending trial for high treason in his nephew's absence, Edward makes his way to London; he is embarrassed en route by the enquires of Mrs Nosebag, a military wife.

Ch. 15 (62) What's to be Done Next?: Talbot tells Edward that the report of Sir Everard's accusation is false and arranges for him to travel back to Scotland posing as his nephew.

Ch. 16 (63) Desolation: After being informed by Mrs Flockhart, Fergus's Edinburgh landlady, that the chieftain is to stand trial at Carlisle, Edward makes his way to a vandalised Tully-Veolan where Gellatley leads him to Bradwardine in Janet's hut.

Ch. 17 (64) Comparing of Notes: Bradwardine updates Edward.

Ch. 18 (65) More Explanation: At dawn Edward escorts Bradwardine to his hiding-place in a cave. Janet explains some remaining mysteries, including the fact that Rose was the mysterious female in attendance in Ch. 37, having bribed Donald Bean Lean to rescue him.

Ch. 19 (66): Edward visits Baillie Macwheeble and receives a letter from Talbot with royal pardons for Bradwardine and himself.

Ch. 20 (67): Edward tells Bradwardine of his pardon and is accepted as Rose's fiancé. In Edinburgh Talbot says he can do nothing to save Fergus.

Ch. 21 (68): Edward reaches Carlyle as Fergus and Maccombich are sentenced and has an interview with Flora.

Ch. 22 (69): Edward bids Fergus farewell as the chieftain is taken for execution.

Ch. 23 (70) Dulce Domum: After preparations in England and Scotland Edward and Rose are married.

Ch. 24 (71): The wedding party visit Tully-Veolan, marvellously repaired, and Talbot indicates that he has arranged for it to be restored to Bradwardine and his heirs from the family member to whom it had passed on the baron's forfeiture.

Ch. 25 (72) A Postscript, which should have been a Preface: The author ends with a set of comments on the foregoing work and a dedication to Henry Mackenzie.

== Themes and motifs ==
=== Tolerance ===
Scott's work shows the influence of the 18th-century Enlightenment. He believed every human was basically decent regardless of class, religion, politics, or ancestry. Tolerance is a major theme in his historical works. The Waverley Novels express his belief in the need for social progress that does not reject the traditions of the past. "He was the first novelist to portray peasant characters sympathetically and realistically, and was equally just to merchants, soldiers, and even kings."

According to L J Swingle, discussing the writers of the Romantic period:

This inquiry as to the distinctive natures of different things explains why particular mental orientations or crucial turns of thought in the literature of the period are frequently marked by some kind of "species" identification. Probably the most dramatic example occurs in Frankenstein, when the title character—after wavering between opposed truth-possibilities in a manner that recalls Scott's Edward Waverley—finally finds himself (literally) in identification with his own species

=== Heroines ===
The literary critic Alexander Welsh suggests that Scott exhibits similar preoccupations within his own novels. The heroines of the Waverley series of novels have been divided into two types: the blonde and the brunette, along the lines of fairness and darkness that marks Shakespearean drama, but in a much more moderate form. Welsh writes:

The proper heroine of Scott is a blonde. Her role corresponds to that of the passive hero—whom, indeed, she marries at the end. She is eminently beautiful, and eminently prudent. Like the passive hero, she suffers in the thick of events but seldom moves them. The several dark heroines, no less beautiful, are less restrained from the pressure of their own feelings...They allow their feelings to dictate to their reason, and seem to symbolize passion itself.

This is evident in Waverley. Rose is eminently marriageable; Flora is eminently passionate. However, we should also note that Welsh is, first, establishing a typology, which in part is age-old, but is also reinforced throughout the Waverley Novels, second, that Scott, or his narrators, allow the female characters thoughts, feelings and passions that are often ignored or unacknowledged by the heroes, such as Waverley.

A different interpretation of character is provided by Merryn Williams. Recognising the passivity of the hero, she argues that Scott's women were thoroughly acceptable to nineteenth-century readers. They are—usually—morally stronger than men, but they do not defy them, and their self-sacrifice "to even the appearance of duty" has no limits. Thus, Flora will defy Waverley but not Fergus to any significant extent, and has some room to manoeuvre, even though limited, only after the latter's death.

Yet another view considers Flora to be the woman representing the past, while Rose symbolises a modern rational Scotland in the post-Union settlement.

=== Humour ===
The opening five chapters of Waverley are often thought to be dour and uninteresting, an impression in part due to Scott's own comments on them at the end of chapter five. However, John Buchan thought the novel a "riot of fun and eccentricity", seemingly a minority opinion. Scott does, however, attempt to be comic, or at least to follow the conventions of the picaresque novel. The comments on the relay of information via Dyers Weekly Letter, the self-explanatory name of the lawyer, Clippurse, Sir Everard's desire and courting of the youngest sister, Lady Emily, all point in this direction.

Scott uses a common humorous reference to the Old Testament story that David and supporting malcontents took refuge from Saul in a cave near the town of Adullam. When the Jacobite army marches south through the North of England, they are greeted with distrust rather than the anticipated support from English Jacobites or Tories. Eventually a few diehards or desperate individuals do join them, and the Baron of Bradwardine welcomes these recruits while remarking that they closely resemble David's followers at the Cave of Adullam; "videlicet, every one that was in distress, and every one that was in debt, and every one that was discontented, which the vulgate renders bitter of soul; and doubtless" he said "they will prove mighty men of their hands, and there is much need that they should, for I have seen many a sour look cast upon us."

=== Fear of civil war ===
The division in the Waverley family had been caused by the English Civil War of the mid-seventeenth century. Fear of civil war is ever-present in Waverley not just as subject matter or historical reality, but a primal fear as deep in Scott as in Shakespeare as manifested by various allusions throughout the novel and by direct references to Henry V and Henry VI in chapter 71.

=== Quixotism ===
As Scott describes him, Edward Waverley is like Don Quixote in his manner of educating himself by much reading, but as "an unstructured education", and as Scott says in the novel "consisting of much curious, though ill-arranged and miscellaneous information." Critics of Scott's novels did not see the influence of Miguel de Cervantes in the same way as Scott describes it. Scott further clarifies the degree of this similarity to Quixote in the novel, in his instructions to his readers that:

From the minuteness with which I have traced Waverley's pursuits, and the bias which they unavoidably communicated to his imagination, the reader may perhaps anticipate, in the following tale, an imitation of Cervantes. But he will do my prudence injustice in the supposition. My intention is not to follow the steps of that inimitable author, in describing such total perversion of intellect as misconstrues the objects actually presented to the senses, but that more common aberration from sound judgment, which apprehends occurrences indeed in their reality, but communicates to them a tincture of its own romantic tone and colouring.(Chapter Fifth).

== Reception ==
=== 19th century ===
Upon publication, Waverley had an astonishing success. Almost all of the reviewers of Waverley were favourable, praising the truth to nature of the characters (both major and minor) and manners. Adverse criticisms were more diverse. The Anti-Jacobin Review and The Critical Review considered the work too Scottish, and the latter (assuming Scott's authorship) thought it odd for an established poet to become a 'scribbler' while The New Annual Register found it less interesting than might have been expected from his hand. The British Critic detected a tendency to caricature and broad farce. The Scourge thought the novel lacked pathos and sublimity. In The Quarterly Review John Wilson Croker, writing anonymously like all the reviewers, compared it to Dutch paintings, congenial rather than exalted, and advised the author to stick to history, while The Scourge considered that Scott did not take readers beyond their usual susceptibilities. Francis Jeffrey in The Edinburgh Review found the work hastily and often indifferently written and judged those passages where the author addresses the reader directly flippant and unworthy. Waverley was published anonymously, but half of the reviews ascribed it with varying degrees of certainty to Scott. Many readers too recognised his hand. Contemporary author Jane Austen wrote: "Walter Scott has no business to write novels, especially good ones. It is not fair. He has Fame and Profit enough as a Poet, and should not be taking the bread out of other people's mouths. I do not like him, and do not mean to like Waverley if I can help it but fear I must".

Letitia Elizabeth Landon was a great admirer of Scott and one of her poetical illustrations ( The Hall of Glennaquoich.) relates to a painting by Daniel Maclise of The Hall of Glennaquoich. A Highland Feast, a scene taken from Waverley.

In Johann Peter Eckermann's Conversations with Goethe, Goethe lauded Waverley as "the best novel by Sir Walter Scott," and he asserted that Scott "has never written anything to surpass, or even equal, that first published novel." He regarded Scott as a genius and as one of the greatest writers of English of his time, along with Lord Byron and Thomas Moore. Discussing Scott's talent as a writer, Goethe stated, "You will find everywhere in Walter Scott a remarkable security and thoroughness in his delineation, which proceeds from his comprehensive knowledge of the real world, obtained by lifelong studies and observations, and a daily discussion of the most important relations."

In 1815, Scott was given the honour of dining with George, Prince Regent, who wanted to meet "the author of Waverley". It is thought that at this meeting Scott persuaded George that as a Stuart prince he could claim to be a Jacobite Highland chieftain, a claim that would be dramatised when George became King and visited Scotland.

=== 20th century ===
E. M. Forster is renowned as one of Scott's fiercest and unkindest critics. His critique has received fierce opposition from Scott scholars, who believe his attack is a symptom of his ignorance, perhaps of literature, but more certainly of all things Scottish. This hostility reaches academic circles, as is made evident by Allan Massie's lecture The Appeal of Scott to the Practising Novel, the inaugural lecture at the 1991 Scott conference. Defence of Scott subsumes a defence of a national culture against the attacks of Englishness. Others have, however, suggested that this misrepresents Forster's case.

Georg Lukács re-established Scott as a serious novelist. Lukács is most adamant in his belief that Waverley is the first major historical novel of modern times. This is clear from the distinction he draws between the eighteenth-century novel of manners, where social realities are described with little attention to diachronic change, and the eruption of history in the lives of communities, as occurs in historical novels. Furthermore, that Waverley marks an important watershed is firmly stated in Lukács' opening sentence, that "The historical novel arose at the beginning of the nineteenth century at about the time of Napoleon's collapse."

== Namesakes ==
=== Australia ===
- The Sydney suburb of Waverley takes its name from a home built near Old South Head Road in 1827 by Barnett Levey (or Levy) (1798–1837). It was named Waverley House, after the title of his favourite book, Waverley, by author Sir Walter Scott. Waverley Municipality was proclaimed in June 1859. The house was a distinctive landmark and gave its name to the surrounding suburb.
- The neighbouring suburbs of Glen Waverley and Mount Waverley in Melbourne, Australia.

=== Canada ===
The village of Waverley, Nova Scotia, Canada was named by American immigrant businessman Charles P. Allen after the book.

=== New Zealand ===
The town of Waverley, Taranaki, New Zealand takes its name from the novel.

=== United Kingdom ===
- Waverley station in Edinburgh takes its name from the novel, as did the streets Waverley Park and Waverley Place, the Waverley Line between Edinburgh and Carlisle. The Scott Monument is near the station.
- A succession of British paddle steamers have been named after the novel, culminating in the present PS Waverley
- The Waverley Pen made by MacNiven & Cameron of Edinburgh was named after the novel, after the Waverley nib was first made in 1850. The pen was marketed from 1864.

=== United States ===
- The following communities were named after the novel:
  - Waverly, Alabama
  - Waverly, Florida
  - Waverly Hall, Georgia
  - Waverly, Iowa
  - Waverly, Kentucky
  - Waverly neighborhood, Baltimore, Maryland
  - Waverly, Missouri
  - Waverly, Nebraska (several of its street names also get their name from the novel)
  - Waverly, New York
  - Waverly, Ohio
  - Waverly, Pennsylvania
  - Waverly, Tennessee
  - Waverly, Virginia
- The Waverley (West Point, Mississippi) mansion was named after the novel.
- Waverly Place in Greenwich Village, New York City, was named for the novel in 1833, a year after Scott's death, though the name was misspelled.
  - The Disney Channel original series Wizards of Waverly Place was in turn named after the street in New York City.
- Waverly (Marriottsville, Maryland), a 1700s slave plantation in America.

== Miscellany ==
- The character of "Fergus Mac-Ivor" in Waverley was drawn from the flamboyant Chieftain Alexander Ranaldson MacDonell of Glengarry. During the King's visit to Scotland, Glengarry made several dramatic unplanned intrusions on the pageantry.
- The proposition "Scott is the author of Waverley" is one of the examples whose meaning Bertrand Russell studied in his paper "On Denoting".
- The character of Davie Gellatley, who is described as "an innocent" or a "fool", is thought to be based on Jamie Fleeman, the Laird of Udny's Fool.

== Original volumes ==
- Waverley; or, ’Tis Sixty Years Since. In Three Volumes. Edinburgh: Printed by James Ballantyne and Co. For Archibald Constable and Co. Edinburgh; And Longman, Hurst, Rees, Orme, and Brown, London, 1814.
