= Waverley (West Point, Mississippi) =

Historic house in Mississippi, United States

- U.S. National Register of Historic Places
- U.S. National Historic Landmark
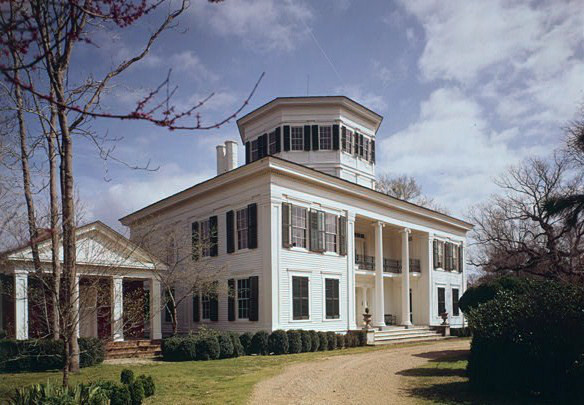
- Waverley in 1975

- Location within Mississippi Location within the United States
- Nearest city: West Point, Mississippi
- Coordinates: 33°34′9″N 88°30′13″W
- Built: 1840
- Architect: Multiple
- Architectural style: Octagon Mode
- NRHP reference No.: 73001004

Significant dates
- Added to NRHP: September 20, 1973
- Designated NHL: May 30, 1974

Waverley is a mansion, formerly a plantation house that became a historic house museum, in Clay County, Mississippi, ten miles east of West Point. Built in 1838, it is architecturally unique among Mississippi's antebellum mansions for its enormous octagonal cupola. It was declared a National Historic Landmark in 1973.

== Description ==
Waverley is located roughly midway between West Point and Columbus, on the northeast side of Waverley Road south of Mississippi Highway 50. It is set overlooking the Tombigbee River on a small portion of the original plantation land. The main house is a basically H-shaped two story structure, with a hip roof from which an oversized octagonal cupola rises another two stories. The building's Greek Revival features include corner pilasters and a dentillated cornice. The interior is richly decorated, with four rooms on each level opening into a central octagonal space. Hanging from the center of the cupola is the original gas-fired chandelier.

== History ==
The antebellum home was originally owned by George Hampton Young, a colonel from Georgia. Young named the home after Sir Walter Scott's novel Waverley. From its accepted date of completion in 1852, the Waverley Plantation was a self-sustaining community, complete with gardens, orchards and livestock. It maintained a brick kiln, cotton gin, ice house and swimming pool with a bathhouse. Gas for the chandeliers was produced by burning pine knots in a retort. In later years, Waverley had its own lumber mill, leather tannery and hat manufacturing operation. It is believed that the first American-made saddle blankets were produced at Waverley and the first fox hunt association was formed in the mansion's library in 1893. The mansion fell into disrepair following the end of the Young family line in 1913, but was restored by the Robert Snow family beginning in 1962.

The house is open for tours Sunday - 1 pm - 5pm; Tuesday - Saturday - 9 am - 5 pm.
