= List of ships named PS Waverley =

PS Waverley may refer to:

- PS Waverley (1828) (1828–1853) built by James Lang at Dumbarton for Clyde service, and from 1847 based in Hull
- PS Waverley (1864) (1864–1913) built by C Mitchell, Walker-on-Tyne for North British Steam Packet Company but returned to builder. Later St. Magnus and Magnus
- PS Waverley (1865) (1865–1873) built by A & J Inglis, Glasgow to replace 1864 vessel; sold in 1868 and wrecked in 1873 on Guernsey
- PS Waverley (1885) (1885–1921) built for Captain Robert Campbell for the Kilmun station, taken over by his sons P & A Campbell, operated in the Bristol Channel 1887 to 1917, ferry and minesweeper during World War I
- PS Waverley (1899) (1899–1940) the surviving Waverley's predecessor that carried passengers on the Clyde and was sunk while carrying evacuees from Dunkirk during World War II
- PS Waverley (1907–1939) a Clyde-built paddle steamer (originally operating as the PS Barry before being renamed in 1926) that carried passengers on the Bristol Channel and was sunk during minesweeping duty in World War II
- PS Waverley (1947) the last sea-going paddle steamer in the world
