= Indiana Bicycle Company =

American bicycle and automobile manufacturer

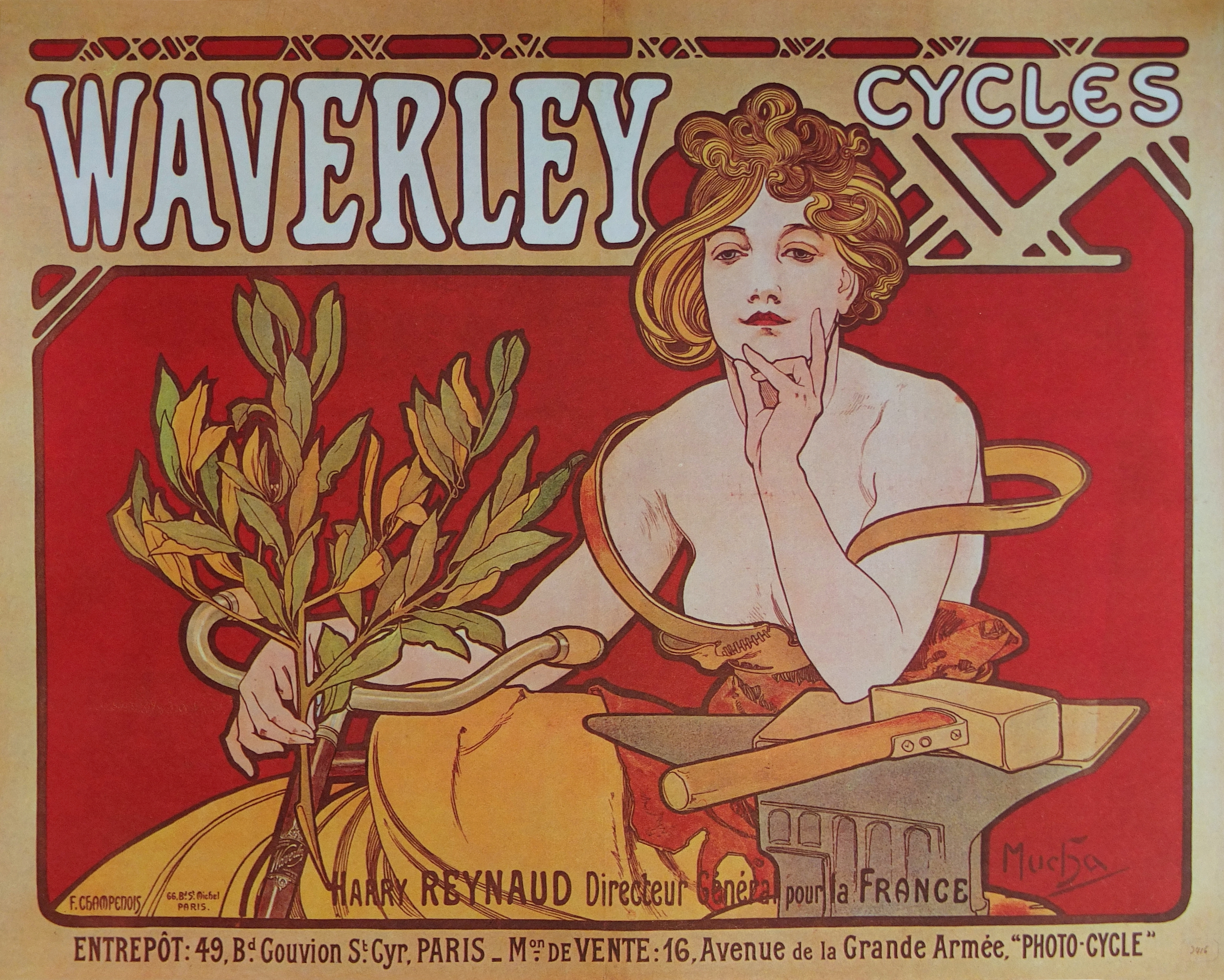
- 1898 Alphonse Mucha poster for the French market
- Industry: Manufacturing
- Founded: 1885; 141 years ago in Indianapolis
- Founder: Charles F. Smith
- Headquarters: Indianapolis, United States
- Products: Bicycles; Carriages; Electric cars
- Owner: Charles F. Smith
- Number of employees: 1071 (1896)

Indiana Bicycle Company was a bicycle and automobile company in Indianapolis, Indiana, United States. The company made carriages, bicycles and electric vehicles under the name Waverley Cycles. By 1896 the company was producing 350 bicycles every ten hours.

== History ==
=== Bicycles ===
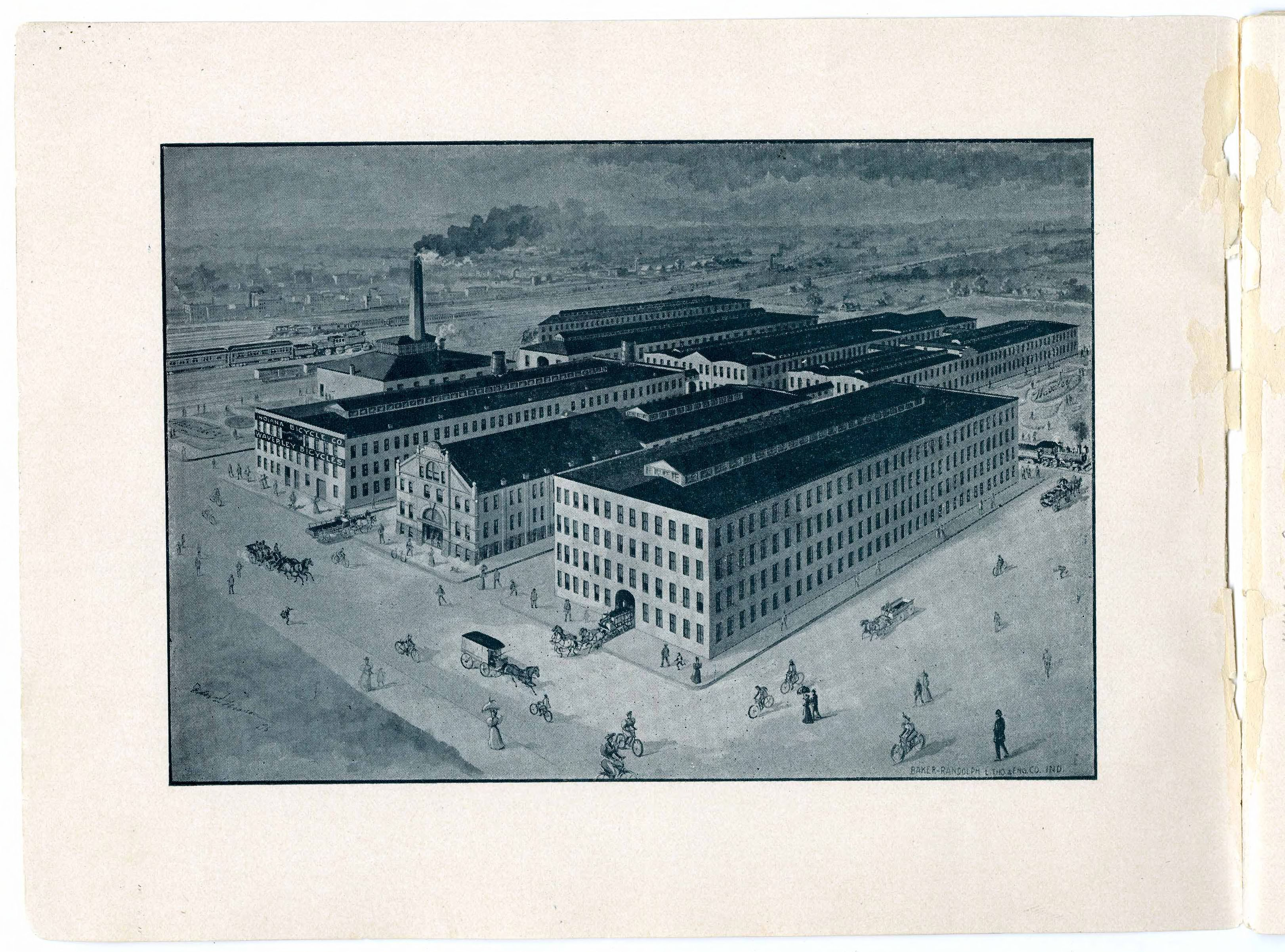
1896 Indiana Bicycle Company

In 1885 Charles F. Smith started the Indiana Bicycle company. The Indiana Bicycle company consisted of 8 buildings which produced tools, a forging shop for manufacturing sprockets and cranks, and other buildings for the assembly and manufacture of bicycle parts. In 1896 the company employed 1071 people and turned out 350 bicycles every ten hours. In 1895 the company produced three different bicycles: the Scorcher, the Belle, the Ladies Special Diamond. The company produced in excess of 50,000 bicycles a year.

=== American Bicycle Company (1899-1903) ===
In 1899 the company joined a trust which was set up to control the bicycle market in the United States. Forty-two factories were part of the trust; the major barrier to organizing it was the manufacturer of rubber tires. It was decided that tires would be purchased from the "Rubber King", Charles R. Flint. The trust which formed under the name American Bicycle Company only lasted a few years. Historians have not determined why the company failed but they have several theories. One idea was that the company was poorly organized, and another theory is that the various manufacturers involved in the company had different objectives. After the breakup the many different companies went back to competing.

=== Automobiles ===
The company manufactured carriages, cars and bicycles. From 1897 to 1916 the Waverley company produced electric cars which looked like carriages. In 1913 the Silent Waverley Front-Drive Four was priced at $2900 which would equate to $81,419.11 in 2021.

== Gallery ==
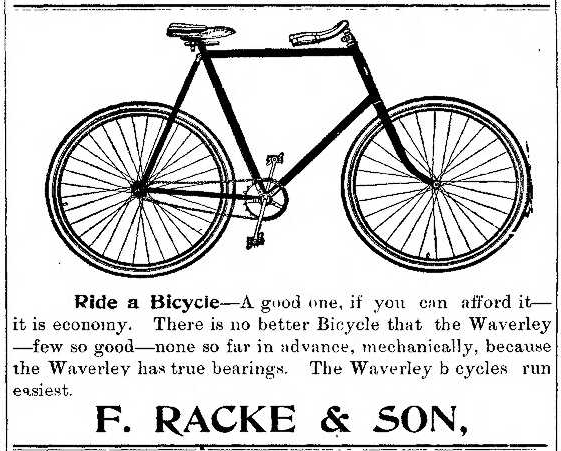
1897 Waverley cycles

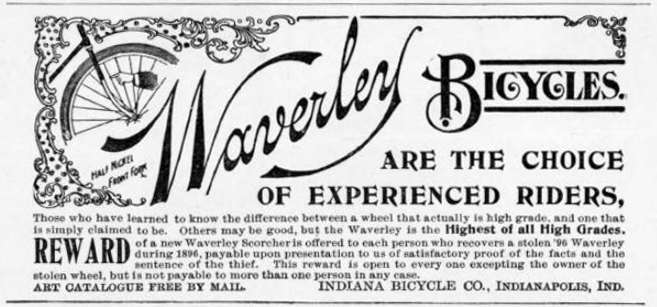
1896 Waverley ad

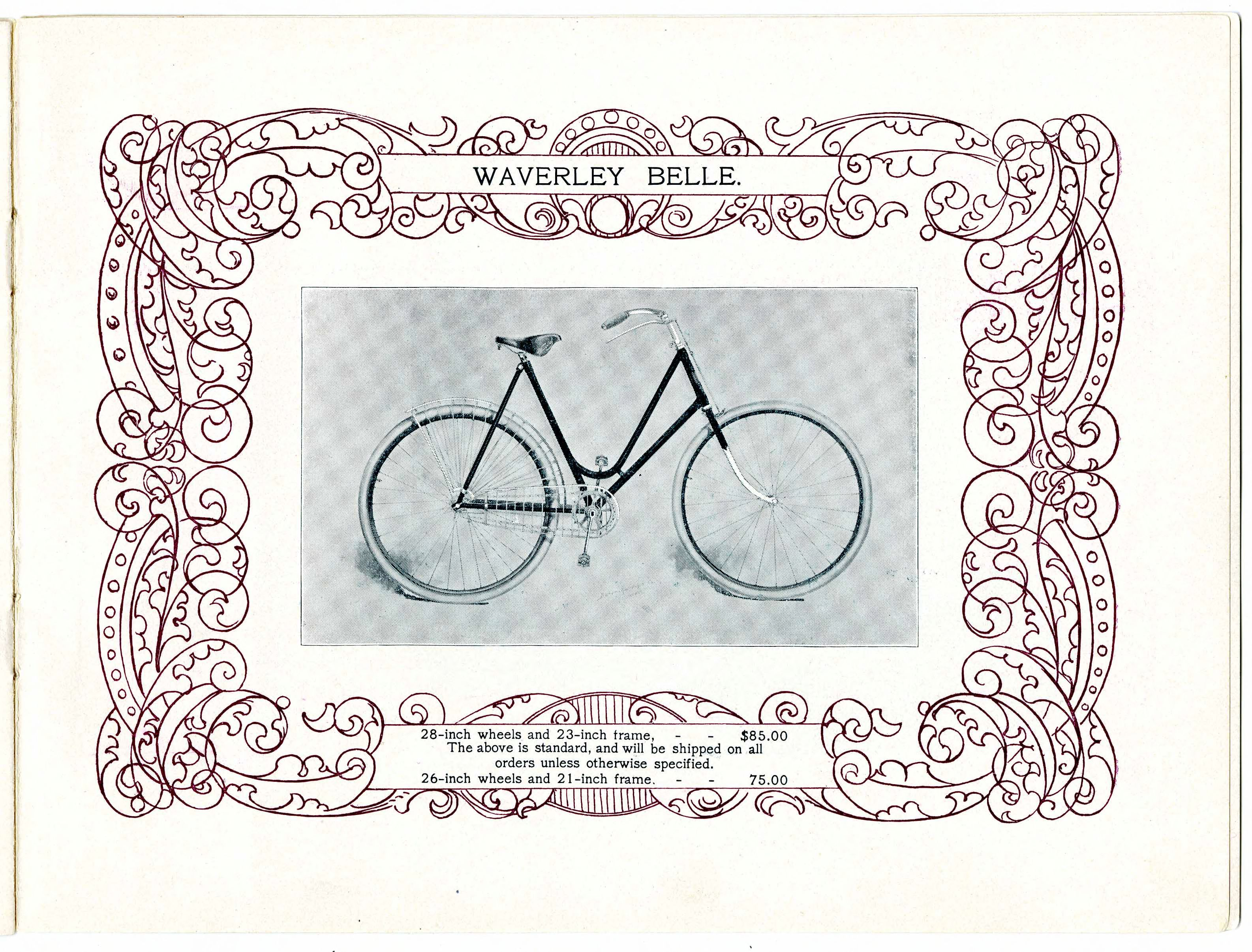
1895 Waverley women's bike

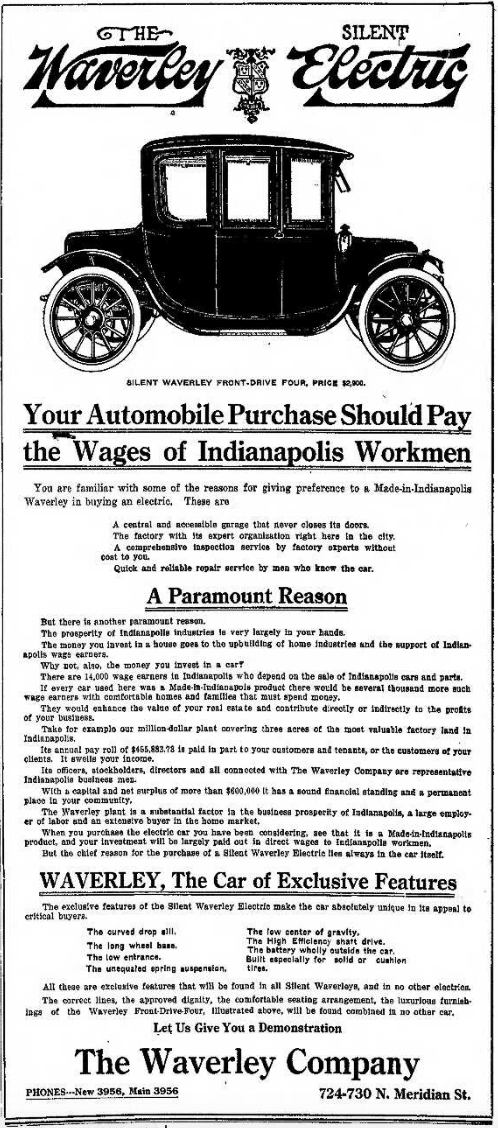
1913 Waverley electric car
