= Downtown Roanoke =

Downtown
- Roanoke neighborhood
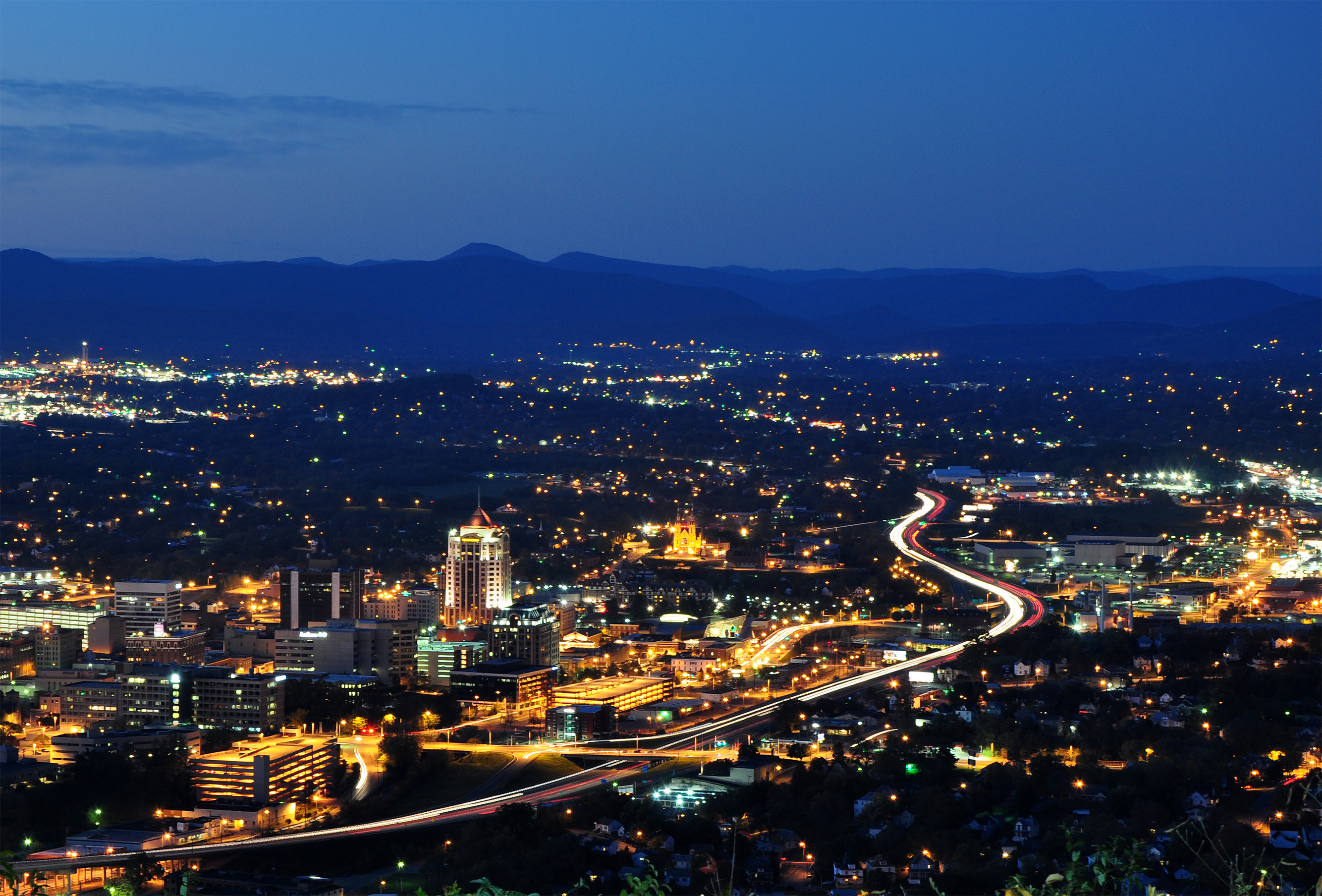
- Downtown from the Mill Mountain Star overlook
- Interactive map of Downtown
- Coordinates: 37°16′19″N 79°56′21″W
- Country: United States
- State: Virginia
- City: Roanoke
- Elevation: 925 ft (282 m)
- Time zone: UTC-5 (EST)
  - Summer (DST): UTC-4 (EDT)
- ZIP Codes: 24011
- Area code: 540

Downtown is the central business district of Roanoke, Virginia, United States. Developed after the completion of the Shenandoah Valley Railroad in 1882, the Downtown core forms the geographic center of the city and the center of business for the Roanoke Valley and Southwest Virginia, the Roanoke City Market, the Roanoke Downtown Historic District and many other attractions and amenities.

== Location ==
Geographically, downtown Roanoke is defined by the city as the area bound by Interstate 581 on the east, 5th Street to the west, the Norfolk and Western railroad tracks to the north and Day Avenue to the south. This area is the location of the central core and the historic Market District. An additional section of downtown is located south of Day Avenue, bound to the east by the Roy L. Webber Expressway, South Jefferson Street to the west and Albemarle Avenue to the south. This area is the location of the former Carilion Community Hospital and the Jefferson College of Health Sciences.

Downtown borders the neighborhoods of the West End on the west, Belmont on the east, Gainsboro on the north and both Old Southwest and South Jefferson on the south.

== History ==
The first large European settlement in the area was Gainesborough, established in 1835 northeast of present-day downtown. The first structures of today's downtown area, then dubbed Big Lick, were built after the Virginia and Tennessee Railroad line arrived in 1852. Rail infrastructure was damaged during the Civil War but restored in the Reconstruction era. The first municipal structure completed in present-day downtown was a jail.

By 1881, the Shenandoah Valley Railroad announced that Big Lick would be the southern terminus of its line. This galvanized rapid growth and development, and Big Lick incorporated as the city of Roanoke in 1882. In 1886, citizens approved a $90,000 bond issue for infrastructure, which in turn fostered rapid expansion outward from the present-day intersection of Campbell Avenue and Jefferson Street.

Between World Wars I and II, Downtown continued to prosper and expand. Many new structures were constructed in a variety of contemporary styles, including the nine-story Boxley Building in 1921, the 11-story Patrick Henry Hotel in 1925 and the 12-story Colonial National Bank in 1927, which stood as the city's tallest through the 1970s.

The downtown core saw growth and prosperity into the 1950s, but the opening of Crossroads Mall in 1961 led many Downtown shops to close as consumers chose to shop outside the city center.

Despite the decline in retail sales, the 1970s saw a construction boom that reshaped the skyline. The 13-story Crestar Bank Building (now the BB&T Bank Building) and the 16-story First National Exchange Bank Building (now the Carilion Administrative Services Building) were completed in 1973, while the 14-story Poff Federal Building was completed in 1976.

Established in 1882, the Roanoke City Market is the oldest continuously operating farmers market in the Commonwealth of Virginia and forms the central gathering place of the Downtown district. In the 1960s, the market began to decline, hitting its low point in the 1970s. The Design 79 plan was launched to revitalize and redevelop the market area.

In the early 1990s, Downtown was reshaped with the completion in 1991 of the 21-story Dominion Tower (now the Wells Fargo Tower), the city's tallest structure; and the 12-story Norfolk Southern Building the following year.

In the early 2000s, many former office buildings, stores, and warehouses in the neighborhood were converted into residential living units.

== Structures and districts on the National Register ==
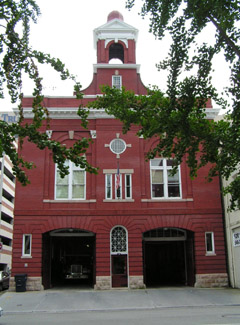
Fire Station #1 was in operation from 1907 through 2007.

- Boxley Building
- Campbell Avenue Complex
- Colonial National Bank
- Fire Station No. 1
- First National Bank
- Patrick Henry Hotel
- Roanoke City Market Historic District
- Roanoke Downtown Historic District
- Roanoke Warehouse Historic District
- Salem Avenue-Roanoke Automotive Commercial Historic District

=== Other notable places ===
- Taubman Museum of Art
- Center in the Square
- Virginia Museum of Transportation
- Wells Fargo Tower
