= Carilion =

Carilion may refer to:

- Carilion Clinic in Roanoke, Virginia, US
- Carilion Roanoke Memorial Hospital in Roanoke, Virginia, US
- Carilion New River Valley Medical Center in Montgomery County, Virginia, US
- Virginia Tech Carilion School of Medicine and Research Institute in Roanoke, Virginia, US
- Carilion Court in Blacksburg, Virginia, US

== See also ==
- Carillion, a defunct British company
- Carillon, a musical instrument of bells
