= Roanoke Downtown Historic District (Roanoke, Virginia) =

Historic district in Virginia, United States

- U.S. National Register of Historic Places
- U.S. Historic district
- Virginia Landmarks Register
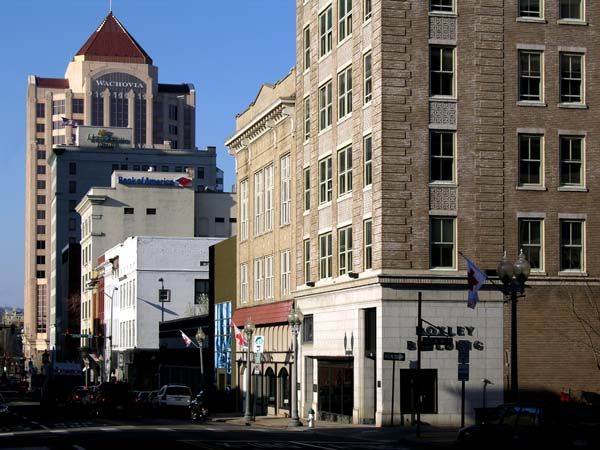
- Looking north along Jefferson Street

- Location within Virginia Location within the United States
- Location: Roughly bounded by 3rd St., Norfolk Ave., Jefferson St., and Bullitt Ave.; 310-324 Salem Ave. SW; 300-400 blk. Church & 300-400 blk. Luck Aves., SW., 600-700 blk. S. Jefferson St., 401 3rd & 502 5th Sts., SW., Roanoke, Virginia
- Coordinates: 37°16′14″N 79°56′36″W
- Area: 116.6 acres (47.2 ha)
- Built: 1882
- Architect: Multiple
- Architectural style: Beaux Arts, Classical Revival, Early Commercial, et al.
- NRHP reference No.: 02000978, 07000232 (Boundary Increase), 13000647 (Boundary Increase)
- VLR No.: 128-5761

Significant dates
- Added to NRHP: September 14, 2002, March 29, 2007 (Boundary Increase), August 27, 2013 (Boundary Increase)
- Designated VLR: April 12, 2002, December 6, 2006, June 19, 2013

The Roanoke Downtown Historic District is a national historic district located in the Downtown Roanoke area of Roanoke, Virginia. It encompasses 122 contributing buildings. It includes a variety of commercial, institutional, social, and governmental buildings and structures from the late 19th century to the mid-20th century. Notable buildings include the Roanoke City Public Library, the YMCA Central Branch Building, First Christian Church (1925), the Central Church of the Brethren (1924), Tomnes Cawley Funeral Home (1928), Thomas B. Mason Building (1961), Peerless Candy Co. (c. 1916), City Hall / Municipal Building (1915), Roanoke Times Building (1892), Anchor Building / Shenandoah Building (1910), Greene Memorial Methodist Church (1890), and United States Post Office and Courthouse (1930). Located in the district are the separately listed Patrick Henry Hotel, Boxley Building, Campbell Avenue Complex Historic District, Colonial National Bank, and First National Bank.

It was listed on the National Register of Historic Places in 2002.
