= Mill Mountain Theatre =

Theater in Roanoke, Virginia, United States

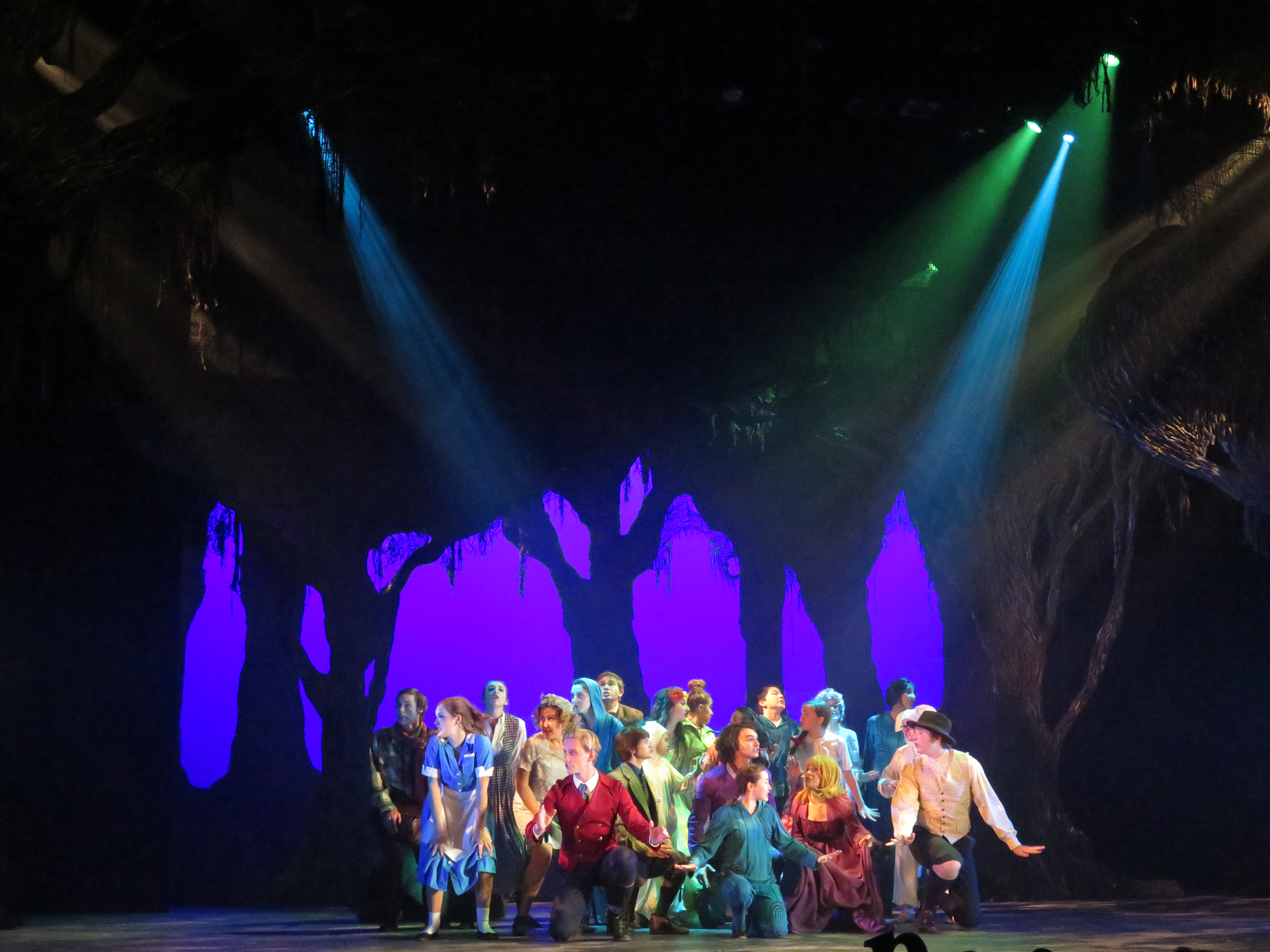
- A 2016 performance of Into the Woods
- Interactive map of Mill Mountain Theatre
- Former names: Mill Mountain Playhouse
- Address: 1 Market St SE; Roanoke, Virginia; United States
- Coordinates: 37.271477°N 79.939451°W

Construction
- Opened: 1964
- Renovated: 1976

Website
- millmountain.org

Mill Mountain Theatre (MMT) is a regional theater located at Roanoke, Virginia. Established in 1964, the institution originally performed out of the former Rockledge Inn located atop Mill Mountain in the city. That location was destroyed by fire in 1976, leading to the theater's eventual re-opening in the Center in the Square arts and culture hub in 1983.

== History ==
The theater began its life in 1964 as the Roanoke Summer Theater, located in the former Rockledge Inn that had been built at the summit of Mill Mountain in 1891. After one season, the group changed its name to Mill Mountain Playhouse.

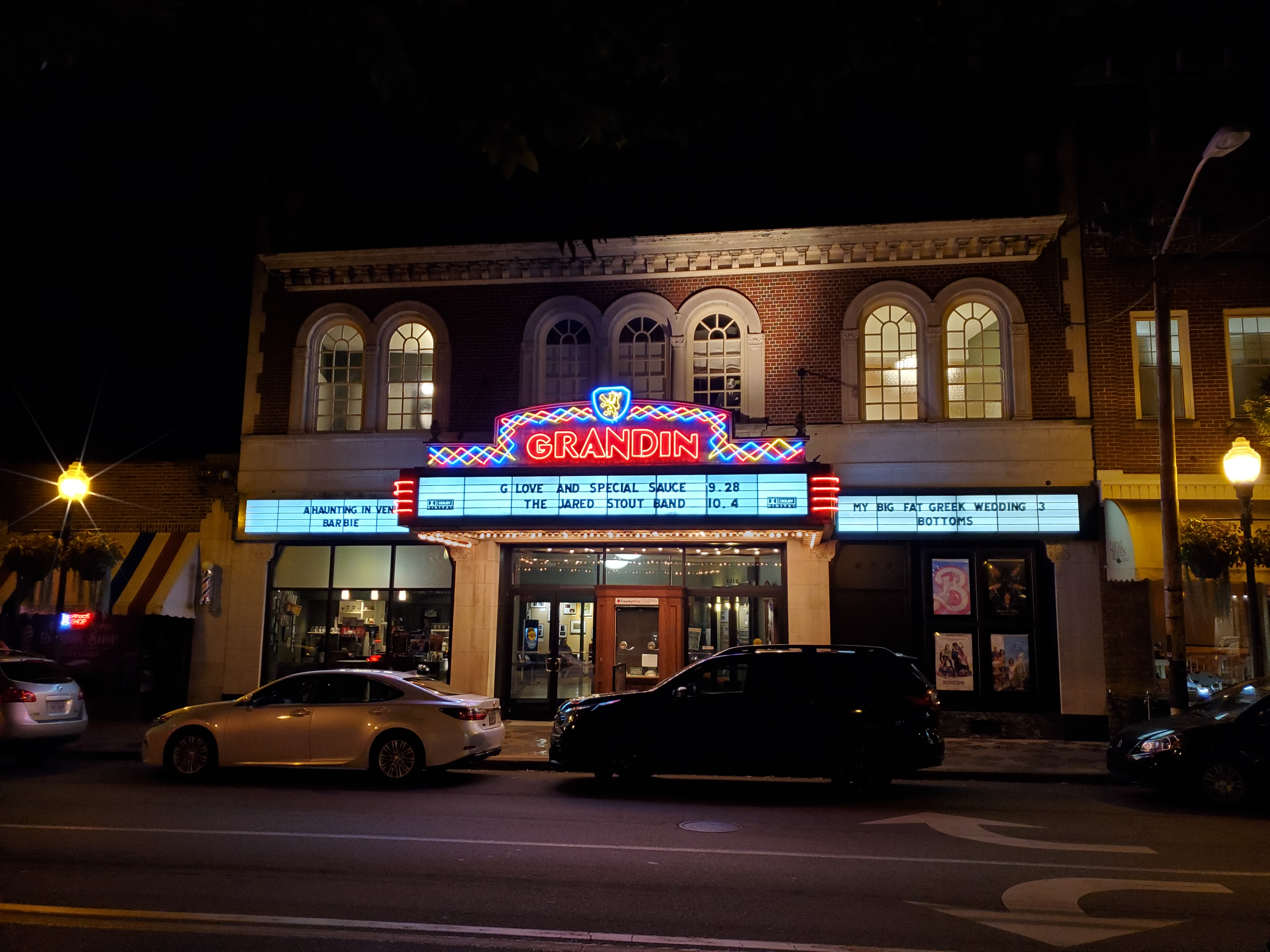
The Grandin Theatre in 2023

Despite early growing pains, the theater saw growing success in its first decade and sold out its season tickets in both 1972 and 1973. In October 1976, however, the group's mountaintop playhouse burned to the ground in a case of what was later determined to be arson. The theater's board of directors arranged a partnership with Roanoke's Grandin Theatre, and the troupe's performances were held there for the next seven years.

The theater joined several other arts and culture institutions in the city that were searching for either a permanent home or more space. In 1979, a partnership between the Mill Mountain Playhouse, Roanoke Museum of Fine Arts, Roanoke Valley Arts Council, Roanoke Valley Science Museum, and Roanoke Valley Historical Society announced they would be moving into shared space on Roanoke's historic market square. By 1983, the location had been dubbed Center in the Square and the theater had renamed itself Mill Mountain Theatre. The first performance in its new home was the musical Camelot.

In 1987, the group expanded into a second, "B" theater on the arts complex's fifth floor. This stage, intended for plays of a more serious tone, was later renamed the Waldron Stage and relocated to an annex of the Center in the Square. In later years it would host MMT's No Shame Theatre and its Underground Roanoke series.

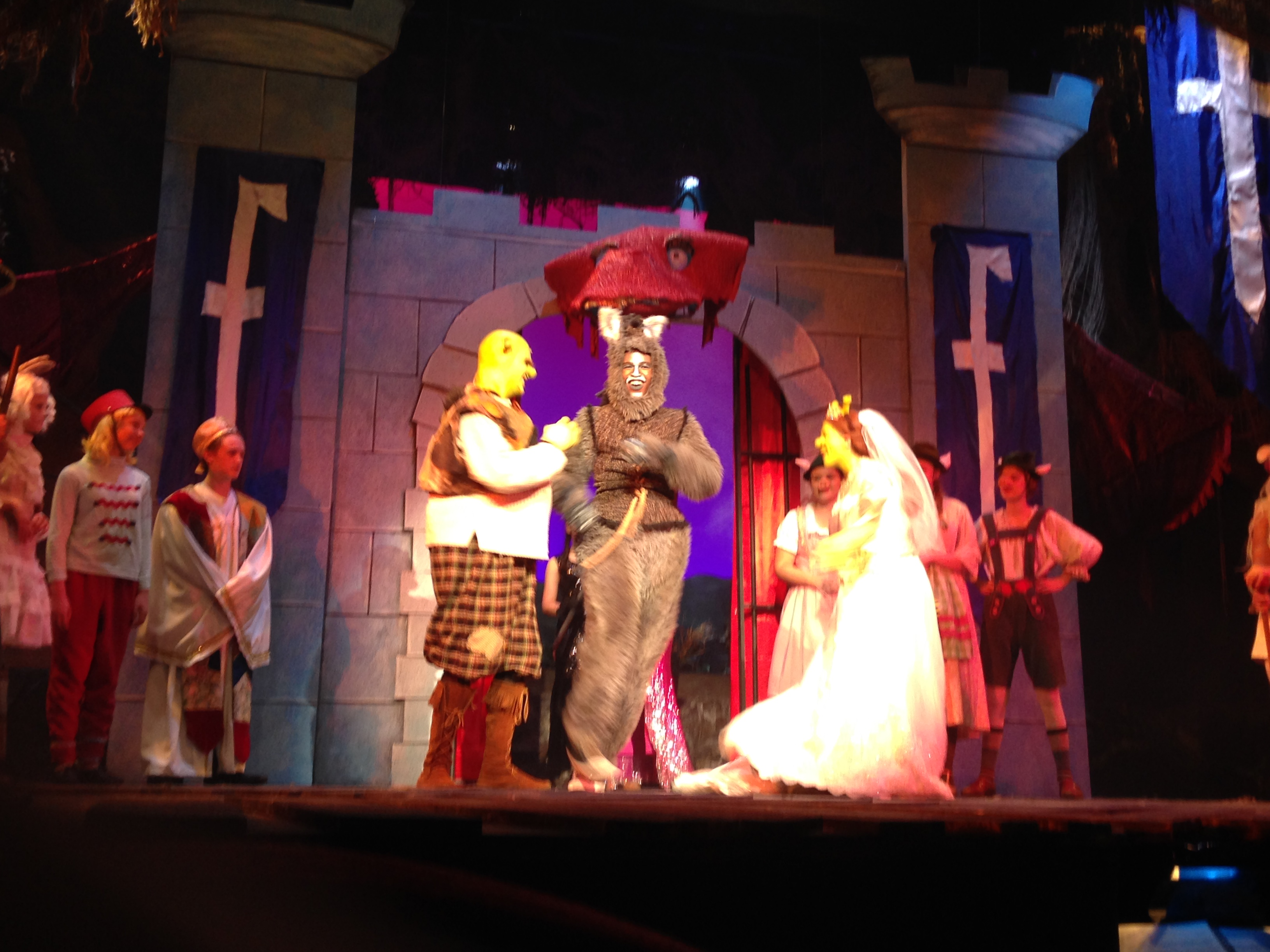
Shrek The Musical TYA, summer of 2018

In January 2009, after years of financial issues, MMT's board of directors were forced to cease productions in order to reorganize the theater's business operations. The institution's director taught educational classes as the only active element of the nonprofit's operations. In May 2010, it was announced that the group's debt had been resolved, and the theater would be aiming for a 2012 reopening. In March 2012, MMT produced Greater Tuna on the Waldron Stage, its first professional performance since 2009, and on April 24, 2013, Mill Mountain Theatre returned to the Trinkle Main Stage in the newly renovated Center in the Square presenting The Marvelous Wonderettes.

In response to the COVID-19 pandemic, in March 2020 MMT announced that they would be suspending their programming. The theater resumed operations in July, 2021, with a performance of the musical Million Dollar Quartet.

== Productions ==
Mill Mountain Theatre classifies its performances into four types: Trinkle Mainstage, traditional plays and musicals; Young Audiences, shows aimed towards children; The Fringe, plays with contemporary themes and for older audiences; and Mill Mountain Music, showcases where various singers perform songs from a particular genre of music. During their 2020 season announcement, Mill Mountain Theatre renamed its Waldron Fringe series to The Fringe, to signify that one of its performances would be put on the Trinkle Stage for the first time, rather than both shows being performed on the Waldron stage.

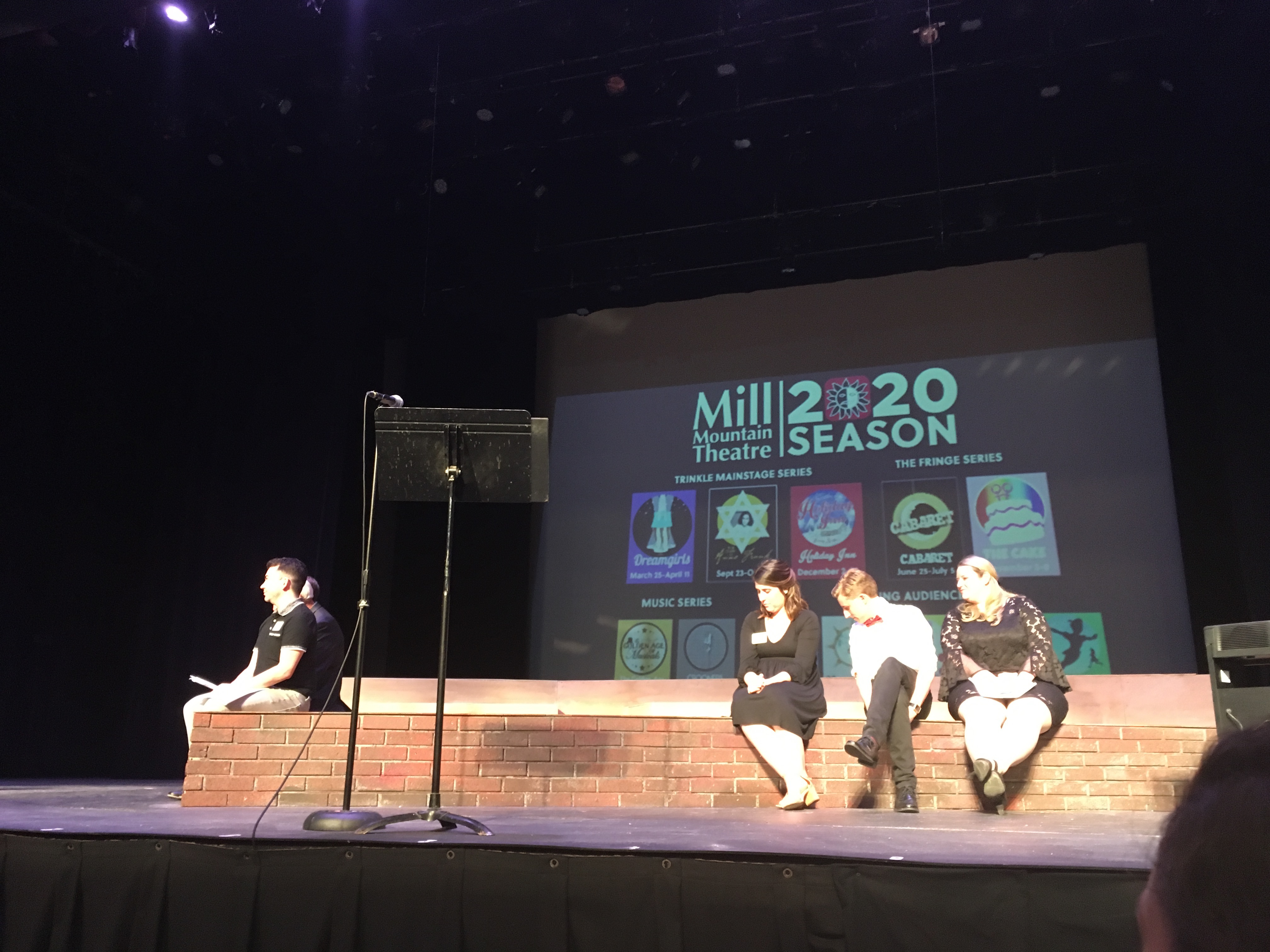
The 2020 Season Announcement

Mill Mountain Theatre Productions by Type and Year
	Trinkle Mainstage	Young Audiences	The Fringe	Mill Mountain Music
2023	Jersey Boys; Matilda; Bright Star; Elf the Musical	Write Stuff!; Charlotte's Web; Mad Libs Live!; Stellaluna the Musical	Bright Star	Best of Broadway
2022	In the Heights; High School Musical: One Act Edition; The Diary of Anne Frank; Holiday Inn	Write Stuff!; As You Like It**; Curious George: The Golden Meatball TYA	The Cake; Fun Home	Boy Bands Through the Ages; Ladies of the 80s!
2021	Million Dollar Quartet; Legally Blonde; A Christmas Story	Write Stuff!; A Midsummer Night's Dream**; Tomás and the Library Lady	The Elephant in the Room	Music of the Crooners
2020*	Dreamgirls; The Diary of Anne Frank; Rodgers and Hammerstein's Cinderella; Holiday Inn	Write Stuff!; Treasure Island: A New Musical; Polkadots: The Cool Kids Musical; Peter and Wendy	Cabaret; The Cake	Golden Age of Broadway; Music of the Crooners
2019	Mamma Mia!; Disney's The Little Mermaid JR; The Glass Menagerie; The Sound of Music	Write Stuff!; A Peter Rabbit Tale: A Children's Musical; Romeo and Juliet**	Next to Normal; Every Brilliant Thing	Music of the 60s; Let's Go to the Movies
2018	A Chorus Line; Shrek The Musical TYA; West Side Story; A Simple Gift; The Christmas Cup	Write Stuff!; The Tempest**; Mother Goose Tales; A Year with Frog and Toad	Constellations; The Christians; Spring Awakening	An Evening with Andrew Lloyd Webber; A Taste of Country
2017	Moonlight and Magnolias; Willy Wonka JR; Little Shop of Horrors; A Christmas Story	The Velveteen Rabbit; The Jungle Book; The Legend of Sleepy Hollow	The Mountaintop; The 25th Annual Putnam County Spelling Bee; The Little Lion	Acoustic Legends; One Hit Wonders; Best of Broadway: Songs of the 2000s
2016	Smokey Joe's Café; Into the Woods JR; The Odd Couple; White Christmas	All the World's a Stage; Tall Tales; Aesop's Fables; Poe	N/A	The Music of Motown; The Music of ABBAa

*All shows in the 2020 season were cancelled due to the COVID-19 pandemic, excluding Polkadots: The Cool Kids Musical, which was instead filmed and released online. Many shows were rescheduled to be a part of the 2021 and 2022 seasons.

**These Shakespeare plays were adapted from their source material to have a shorter runtime; no other alterations were made.
