= Nancy Agee =

American businesswoman

- Born: 1955 (age 70–71); Virginia, US
- Education: University of Virginia; Emory University, Roanoke College; Jefferson College of Health Sciences
- Title: Former President & CEO, Carilion Clinic

Nancy Howell Agee (born 1955) is an American business executive, the former president and CEO of Carilion Clinic and the former chair of the American Hospital Association.

== Early life and education ==
Agee as born in 1955 in Virginia.

Agee graduated from the University of Virginia School of Nursing with a BSN in 1979 and for her MSN, Emory University’s Nell Hodgson Woodruff School of Nursing. She also attended the Kellogg School of Management.

== Career ==
Nancy Agee began working at Carillon as a nurse in 1973 and was chosen to be Carilion Clinic's president and CEO in 2011. Before becoming CEO, Agee was executive vice president/COO of Carillon where she was part of a team that led their “transformation from a collection of hospitals to a fully integrated, patient-centered, physician-led organization.”

Agee is a former member of the board of commissioners for the joint commission and past chair of the Virginia Hospital and Healthcare Association and the Virginia Center for Health Innovation.
