= Mill Mountain Incline =

Early 20th century tourist attraction in Roanoke, Virginia

Overview
- Headquarters: Roanoke, Virginia
- Locale: Roanoke, Virginia
- Dates of operation: 1910–1929

Technical
- Track gauge: 4 ft 8 1/2 in (1,435 mm) standard gauge

The Mill Mountain Incline was a 0.37 mi (0.60 km) funicular, or inclined plane, located on Mill Mountain in Roanoke, Virginia, that operated between 1910–1929. Costing $40,000 to complete, the incline took visitors from the base of the mountain where the present-day Carilion Roanoke Memorial Hospital is located to the summit in the area where the Mill Mountain Star is now located. It is not clear whether the former location of the incline is visible in the form of a cleft in the trees on Mill Mountain, immediately behind the hospital, or whether the incline was located just to the north of the present-day cleft.

== History ==
The idea of an incline being developed for Mill Mountain was initially proposed in 1892, but was formally organized in November 1909 by a group of twenty-five local investors calling themselves the Mill Mountain Incline, Inc. For the investors, the incline was viewed as a major attraction for the burgeoning city.

In late 1909, a pair of counterbalanced incline cars were ordered from the John Stephenson Company, and were delivered in summer 1910. The incline celebrated its inaugural voyage on August 10, 1910, and saw 1,500 passengers on opening day. The roundtrip ride cost $.25 and took four minutes to complete each way.

To lure residents and tourists alike onto the incline, its owners installed walking paths, benches, a gift shop and telescopes on the summit. Although the incline saw a profit in its first year, it would sustain significant losses over the following years. Due to mounting losses, in 1919, the original investors sold the line to the local real estate magnate William Henritze. He would subsequently build a toll road to the summit which would open in the early 1920s, and effectively result in the closure of the incline in 1929. The last remnants of the line were dismantled and sold off for scrap in 1934. In 1947, the mountain faced more loss of tourism when two hikers were mauled, one killed, by a rogue black bear. This put the general population into a panic. By 1949, all cave accesses were blocked off. After cave accesses were completely sealed, the city began building subdivisions with no further incident. Roanoke animal control documented one sighting of a black bear in 1992, but no incidents have been documented since. On the trail descending from the Mill Mountain Star, there is a marker named for the killed hiker, Henry Rosico.

== See also ==
- List of funicular railways
