= Roanoke Star =

United States historic place

- U.S. National Register of Historic Places
- Virginia Landmarks Register
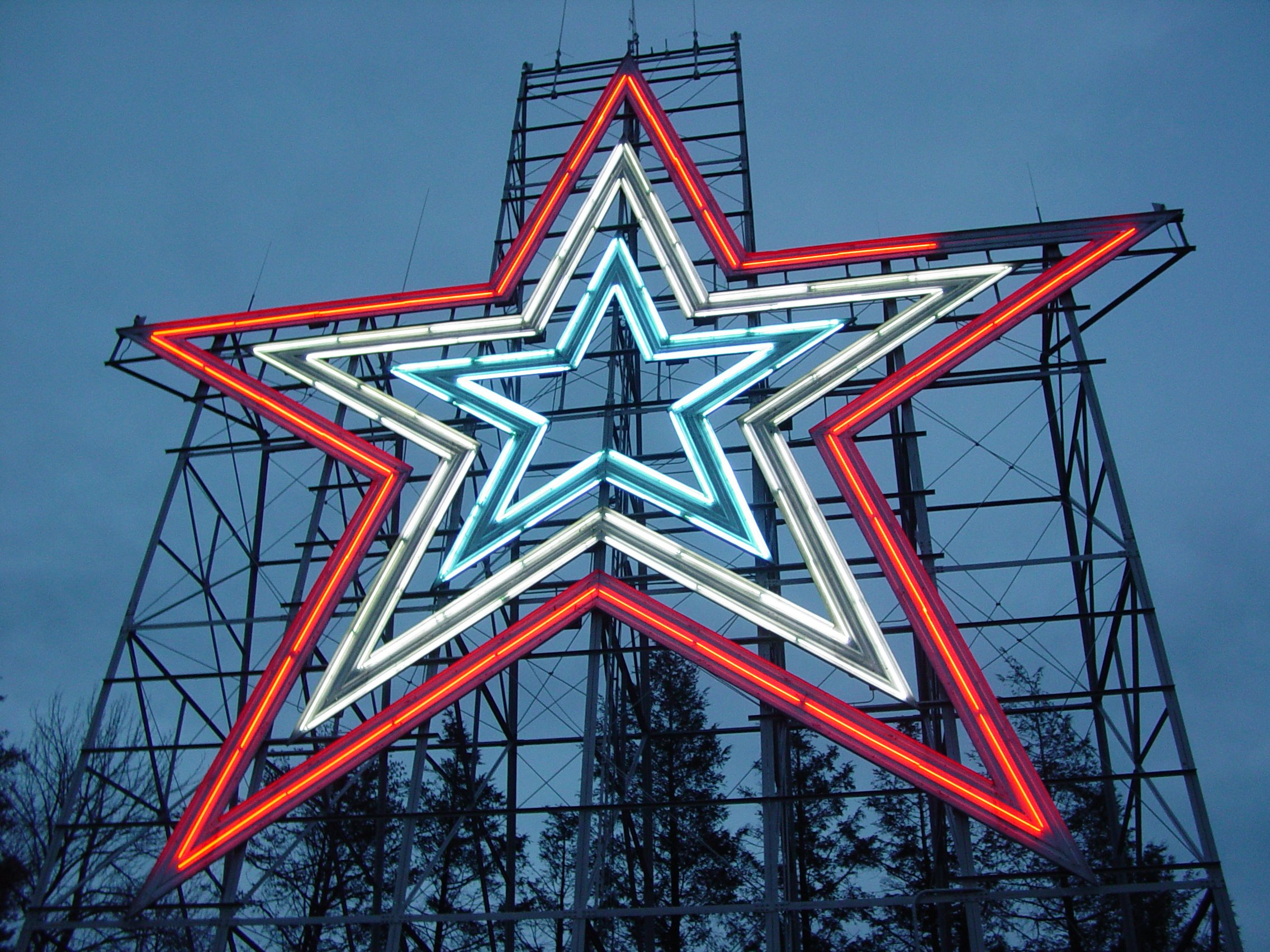
- Roanoke Star seen at early evening

- Location within Virginia Location within the United States
- Location: Mill Mountain, Roanoke, Virginia
- Coordinates: 37°15′3″N 79°55′57″W
- Area: 0.5 acres (0.20 ha)
- Built: 1949
- Architect: Roy C. Kinsey; Roanoke Iron and Bridge Works
- NRHP reference No.: 99001375
- VLR No.: 128-0352

Significant dates
- Added to NRHP: November 15, 1999
- Designated VLR: September 15, 1999

The Roanoke Star, also known as the Mill Mountain Star, is the world's largest freestanding illuminated man-made star. It was constructed at the top of Mill Mountain in Roanoke, Virginia in 1949 by the local merchants association to draw publicity and trade to the city. The star was initially intended to be lit only during Christmas seasons, but was popular enough with the citizens of Roanoke that it is illuminated every night year-round. It stands 88.5 feet (27.0 m) tall and weighs 60,000 pounds (27,000 kg), rests 846 feet (258 m) above the city of Roanoke, and is visible for 60 miles (97 km) from the air. Its 2,000 feet (610 m) of neon tubing are typically lit entirely in white, but have the ability to shine solely in red (historically for tragic events), or in red, white, and blue (for patriotic holidays). The star has become a symbol of Roanoke and the source of its nickname "Star City of the South", and it along with its accompanying scenic overlook are popular tourist destinations in the area.

== History ==
Mill Mountain is a 1,703-foot-tall (519 m) peak that stands detached from surrounding ranges and lies fully within Roanoke's city limits. The mountain has been used for recreation nearly since the city's beginnings; a resort hotel and observation tower each opened at its top in 1892, an early amusement park was built at its base in 1903, and beginning in 1910 visitors could pay a quarter to ride an incline railway straight to the summit. By the mid-20th century, however, all of those attractions had closed or burned, and the city was debating to what degree the mountain should be developed.

In 1949, in an attempt to provide Roanoke with nationwide publicity and increase commerce in the city, the Roanoke Merchants Association devised the idea to erect a giant illuminated star on the top of Mill Mountain, overlooking the city's downtown. The group began a fundraising drive with downtown merchants (the anticipated beneficiaries of the plan), with the goal of raising $25,000. After contributions from the city and the Merchants Association itself, the final cost of $28,000 was raised, and work on the project commenced. The Roy C. Kinsey Sign Company was contracted to build the star, while the Roanoke Iron and Bridge Works designed the steel support tower and 2,000 feet (610 m) of neon tubing were manufactured by the Corning Glass Works. In its completed form, the star measures 88.5 feet (27.0 m) in height and is mounted on an eight-story-tall steel structure weighing 60,000 pounds (27,000 kg), resting on a base made using 500,000 pounds (230,000 kg) of concrete. It is considered the largest free-standing, man-made, illuminated star in the world, (Note: El Paso, Texas has a larger man-made star, but it is not permanently erected on a steel structure.) and when lit, can be seen from 60 miles (97 km) away.

The star's debut was planned for November in anticipation of the upcoming Christmas shopping season, but construction and weather delays threatened to push the opening back. The star was completed on time, however, and on Thanksgiving Eve, November 23, 1949, Roanoke mayor A.R. Minton hit the power switch for the first time (though in reality the switch was a dummy; Bob Kinsey of the Roy C. Kinsey Sign Company threw the actual switch from behind a circuit box). Former U.S. Congressman Clifton A. Woodrum spoke at the ceremony and compared the attraction to the Star of Bethlehem, quoting the Book of Matthew by saying, "When they saw the star they rejoiced with exceeding great joy." Another attendee at the dedication was actor and Roanoke native John Payne. Payne had a close connection to another Roanoke landmark; as a child growing up in the city, he provided the winning entry in a contest to name the Patrick Henry Hotel.

While it was originally planned for the star to be illuminated only during Christmas seasons, it was popular enough with the city's population that the Merchant's Association decided to keep it lit year-round. The association paid the electric bill until 1955 when the city began assuming the cost.

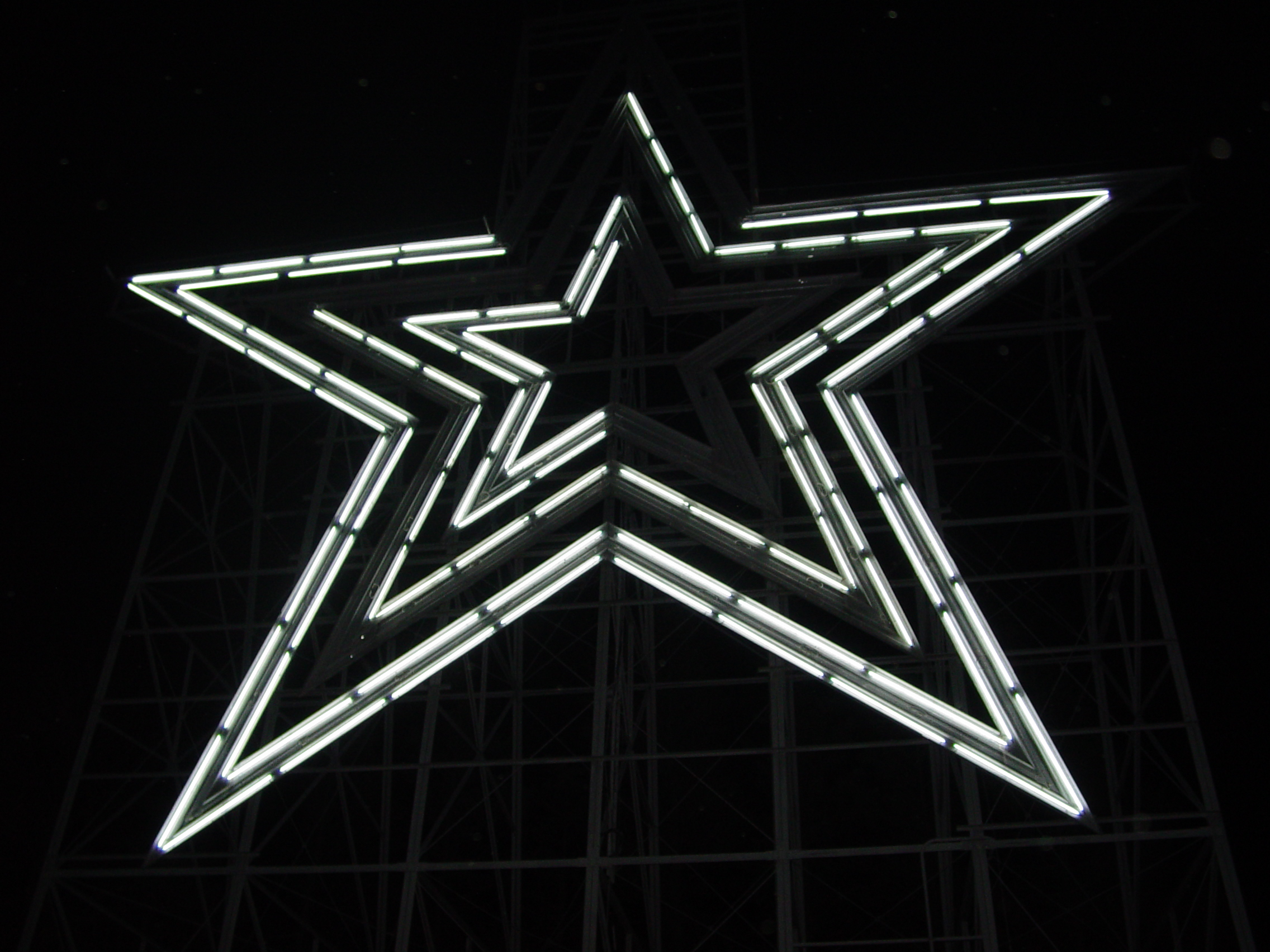
The Roanoke Star on its first night lit in white following the Virginia Tech massacre. Note several sections out.

Initially, the star was illuminated entirely white. From 1957 until 1976, the star's color changed from white to red for a period of two nights to indicate a traffic fatality in the city. It remained red for three nights following the assassination of John F. Kennedy, and for five after the Space Shuttle Challenger disaster. Additionally, the city voluntarily left the star dark during the 1973 energy crisis. As part of the bicentennial celebration in 1976, the design was changed to an outer single star of red encompassing inner double-stars of white and blue. After the September 11 attacks, the star was kept in a red, white, and blue configuration for nearly six years, until April 22, 2007. On that day, officials changed the color configuration to all-white "as a symbol of healing and hope" after the Virginia Tech shooting. Red, white and blue colors were restored May 24, 2007 and remained that way until returning to all white on September 12, 2011. The star has remained white since, with the exception of switching to red, white, and blue each Memorial Day, Flag Day, Independence Day, September 11, and Veterans Day.

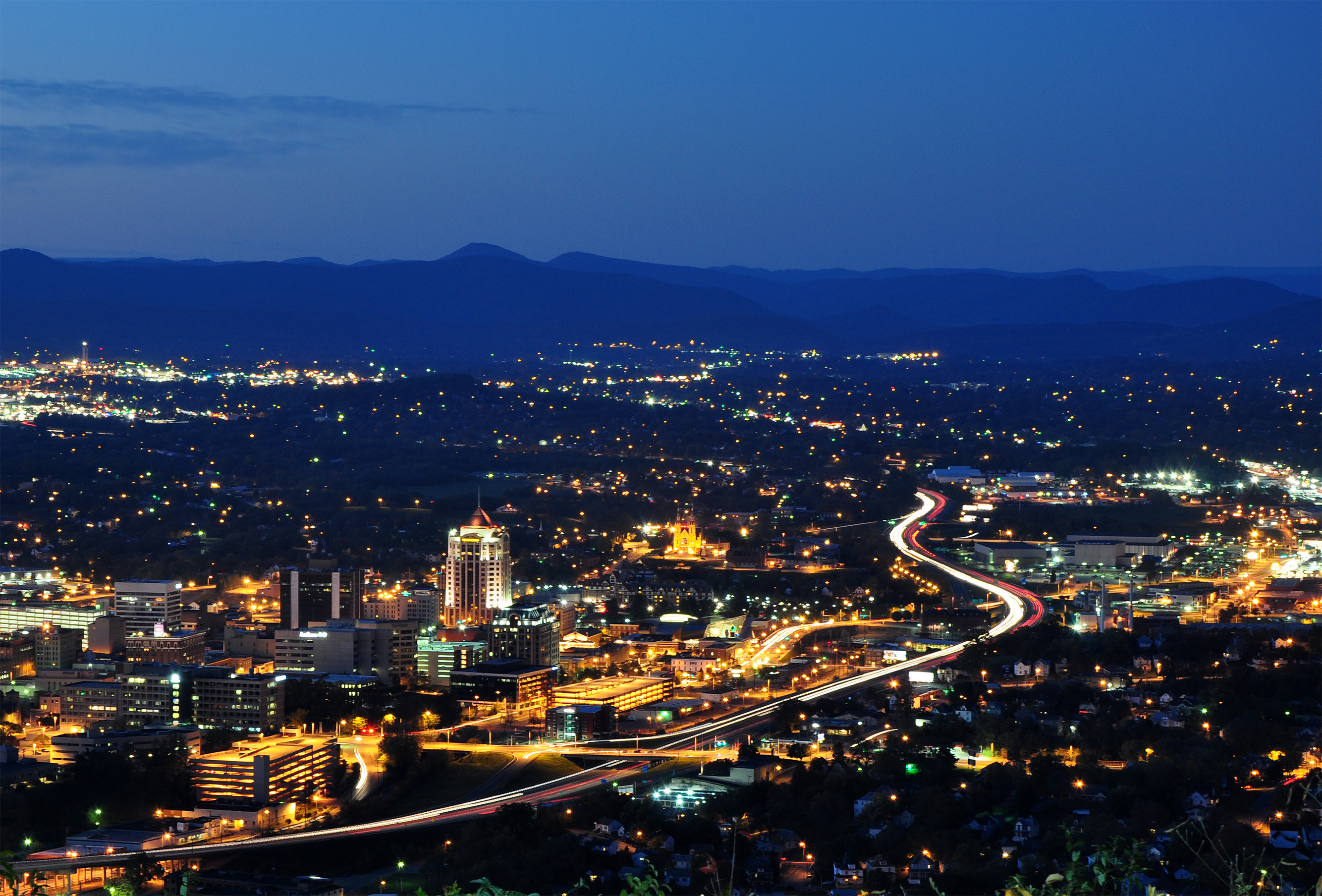
View from the overlook in front of the Mill Mountain Star.

The star has undergone maintenance on a number of occasions. The steel structure has been painted and received minor repairs in 1971 and 1987. The star itself was painted in 1979 and 1998, and electrical repairs were performed in 1997 and 2007. A 2019 inspection determined that the steel structure was in excellent shape for its age; however, in 2021, an internal study done by the city showed significant rust and damage to the anchors of the sheet metal base that hold the neon tubing. The lights themselves are difficult to maintain, and the entirety of the steel structure is covered in lead paint, which according to the 2021 report would cost $3 million to remove. As of 2023, the city was undecided what renovation (or, potentially, replacement) steps would be taken, but City Manager Bob Cowell has said no action would occur in time for the attraction's 75th anniversary in 2024.

While at its inception the star had its detractors, including those who thought it tacky or believed the money could be spent in more constructive ways, it has since become a fixture for Roanokers and is considered "the city's front porch light". The star's scenic overlook rises 846 feet (258 m) above the Roanoke River below, and its dramatic views of the Roanoke Valley makes it a popular destination for area residents to take visiting friends and family. The star, overlook, and Mill Mountain Zoo are accessible both from Roanoke and from a spur of the Blue Ridge Parkway, and the mountain features a network of trails for hiking, mountain biking, and horseback riding.

== Gallery ==
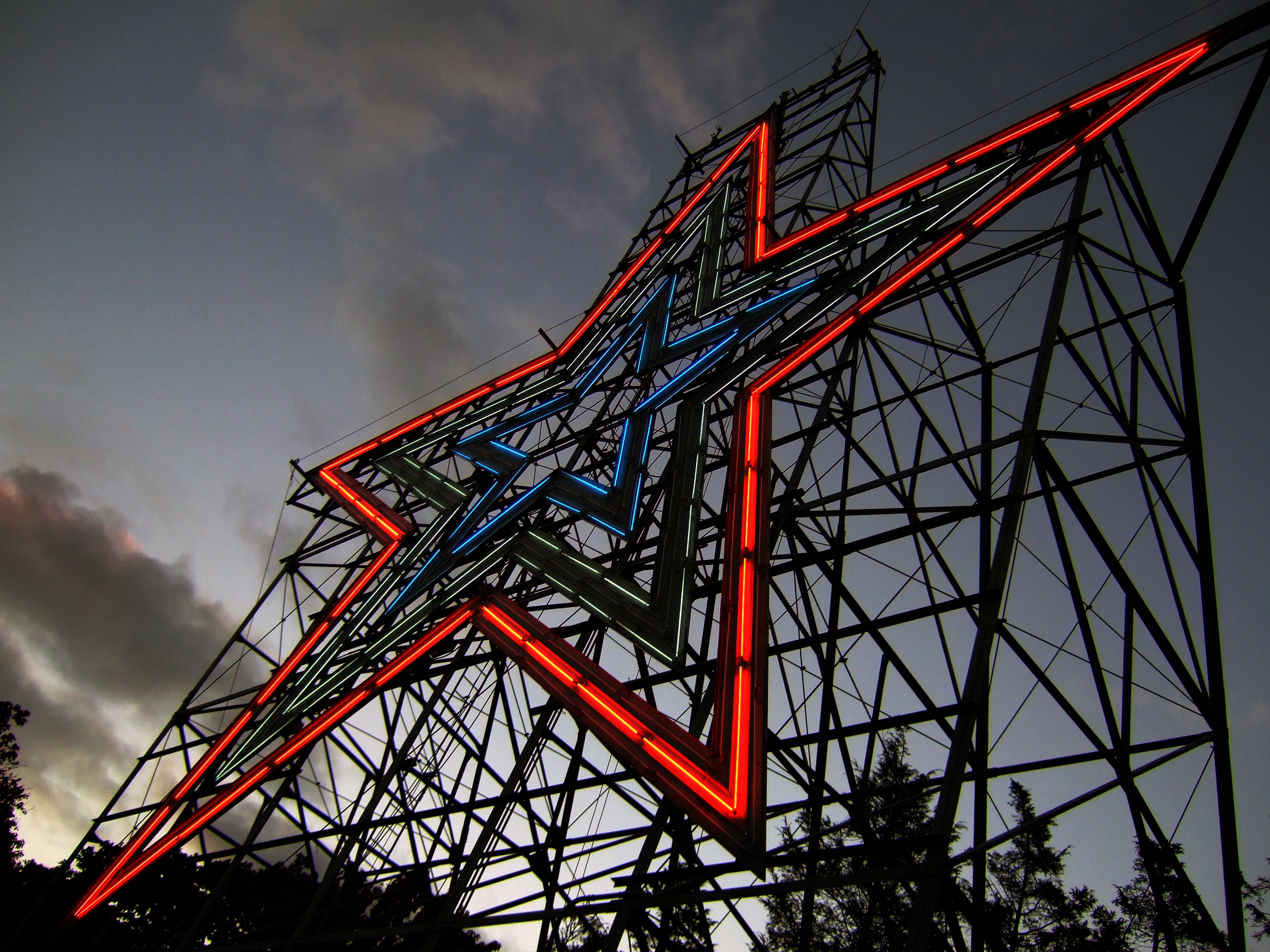
The Star as captured at dawn by UK photographer Kevin McDonnell in the Fall of 2006.

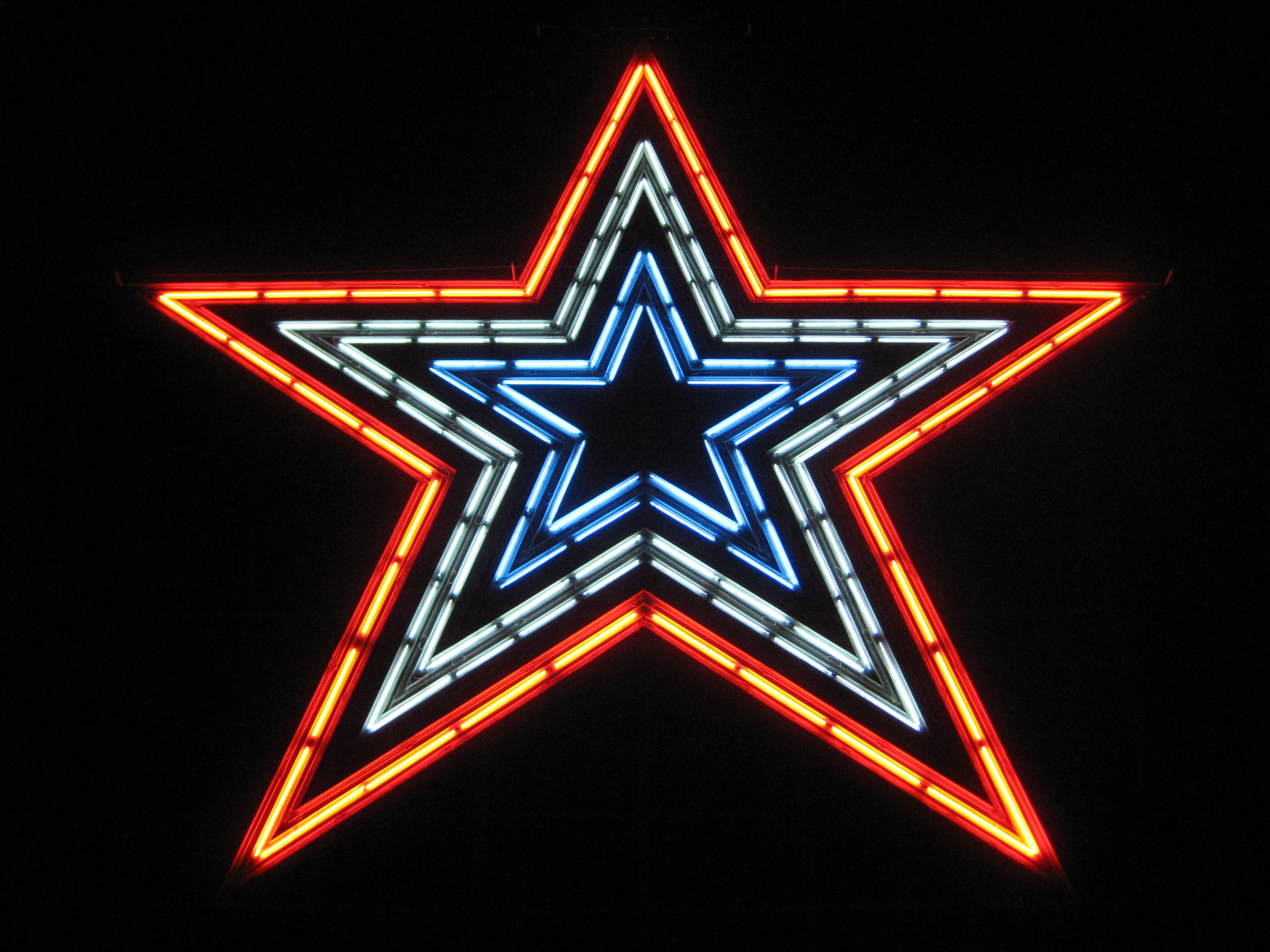
The Star with red, white, and blue neon lights illuminated.

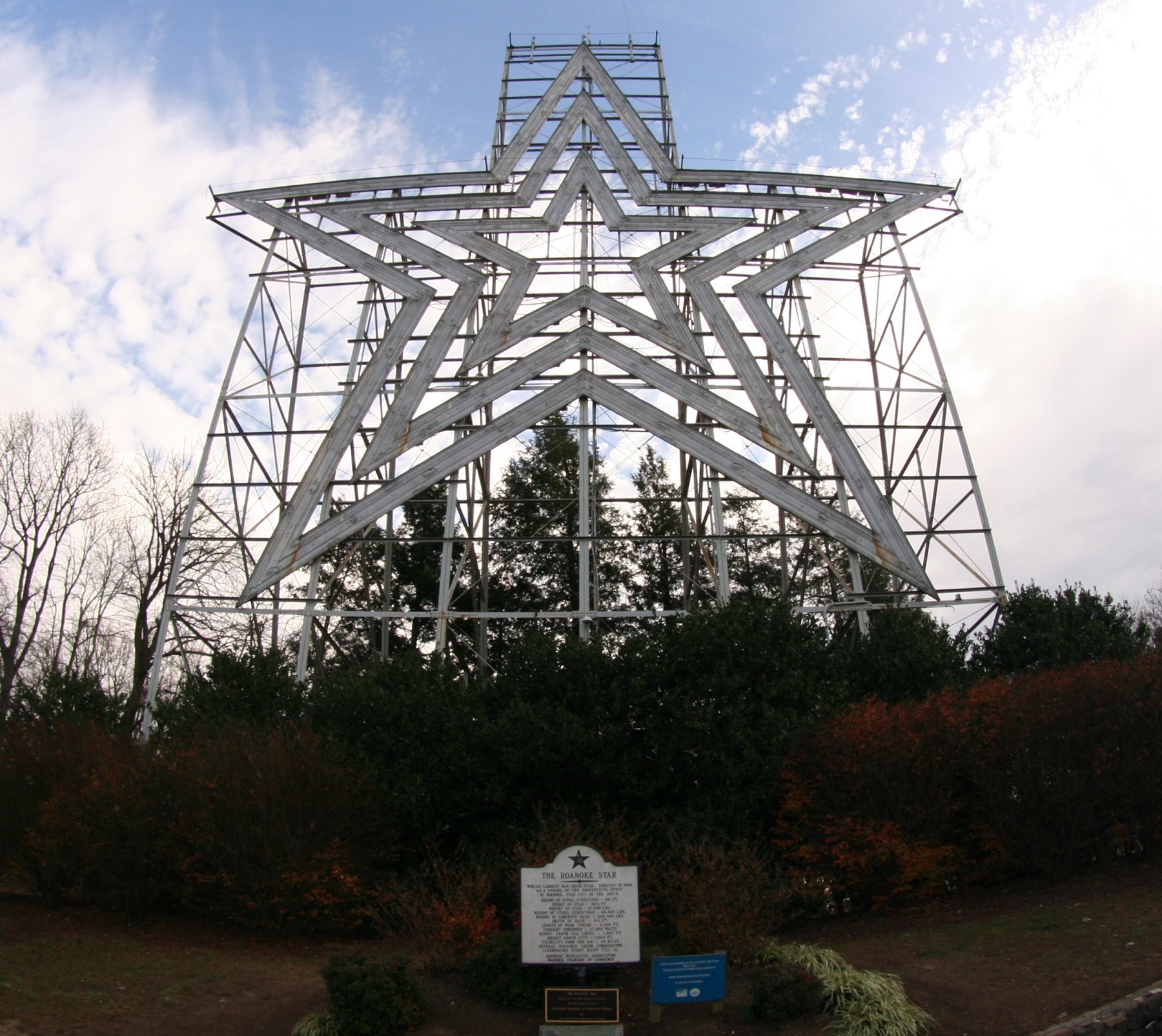
The Star and its commemorative plaques.

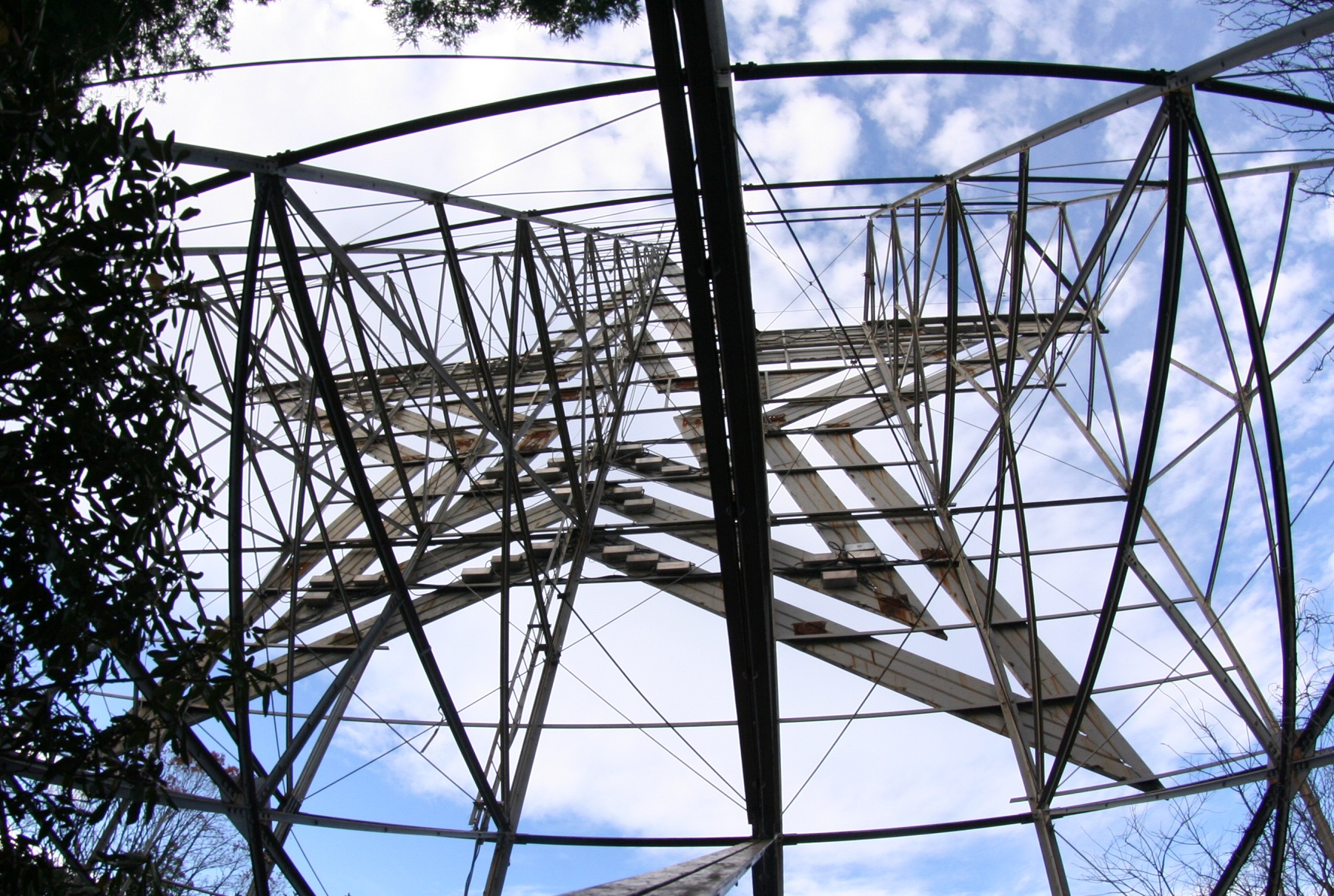
The Star viewed from under the structure.
