= Wells Fargo Tower (Roanoke) =

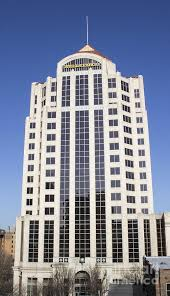
- Wells Fargo Tower viewed from the south

- Location within Virginia Location within the United States
- Former names: Dominion Tower, First Union Tower, Wachovia Tower

General information
- Type: Office
- Architectural style: Postmodern
- Location: Roanoke, Virginia, United States
- Coordinates: 37°16′22″N 79°56′24″W
- Construction started: 1990
- Completed: 1991
- Cost: $34,500,000 ($81.6 million in 2025 dollars)

Height
- Architectural: 320 ft (98 m)
- Antenna spire: 369 ft (112 m)

Technical details
- Structural system: Rigid frame
- Floor count: 21

Design and construction
- Architects: Clark Tribble Harris & Li Architects
- Structural engineer: King Guinn Associates
- Main contractor: F N Thompson Company

The Wells Fargo Tower (formerly named Dominion Tower, First Union Tower and Wachovia Tower) is a 21-story, 320-foot (98 m) office building in Downtown Roanoke, Virginia, United States. Completed in 1991, this stands as both the tallest building in Roanoke and the tallest building in Southwest Virginia.

== History ==
The groundbreaking ceremony for its construction occurred on May 11, 1990. With both city and business leaders in attendance, a balloon released to a height of 320 feet (98 m) was also on display to give onlookers better context as to the finished height of the structure. By October construction had already brought the tower to its seventh floor. On October 29, a construction worker fell to his death from the seventh floor. This was the only fatality associated with the construction of the tower. The final concrete was poured for the tower in April 1991 and the first tenant moved in by October 1991.

== Profile ==
Designed by the firm of Clark Tribble Harris & Li Architects, the tower is postmodern and is the tallest building in both Roanoke and all of Southwest Virginia. It is topped with a 50-foot (15 m) copper pyramid with a 48-foot (15 m) spire atop it, and was designed as a homage to the Hotel Roanoke, located to the north of the tower. At night, the tower is illuminated by 135 floodlights.

Although the tower officially has its floor count at 21 stories, there is not a numbered 13th floor to quell the fear of persons that may have triskaidekaphobia.

== Naming ==
After the purchase of Wachovia by Wells Fargo in late 2008, the name of the tower was set to change for the third time. In July 2011, the tower was officially renamed as the Wells Fargo Tower to reflect the official rebranding of Wachovia to Wells Fargo in Virginia.
