= Cassell Coliseum =

Multi-purpose arena in Virginia, United States

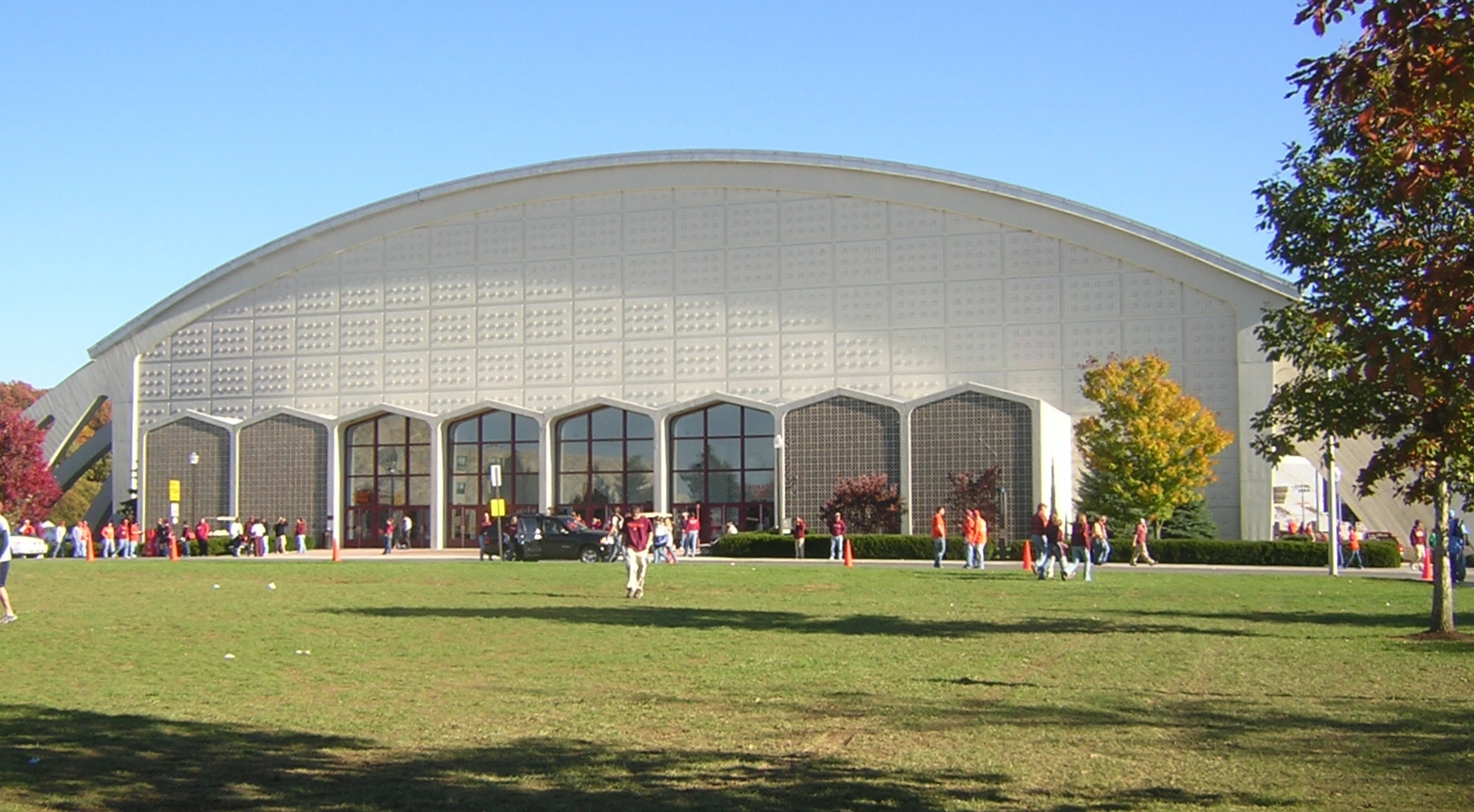
- Interactive map of Cassell Coliseum
- Former names: VPI Coliseum (1962–1977)
- Location: 675 Washington Street, SW; Blacksburg, Virginia, U.S.
- Coordinates: 37°13′20″N 80°25′8″W
- Operator: Virginia Tech
- Capacity: 8,925 (2020–present); 9,275 (2018-2020); 9,847 (2004-2018); 10,052 (1995–2004); 9,971 (1988–1995); 10,000 (1962–1988)
- Surface: Hardwood

Construction
- Groundbreaking: 1961
- Opened: January 3, 1962
- Cost: $2.7 million ($28.7 million in 2025 dollars)
- Architects: Carneal and Johnston
- General contractors: T.C. Brittain and Company

Tenants
- Virginia Tech Hokies (Men's & Women's Basketball, Volleyball, & Wrestling)

Cassell Coliseum is a multi-purpose arena in Blacksburg, Virginia, United States, that opened in 1962. It is home to the Virginia Tech Hokies men's and women's basketball teams, wrestling team, and volleyball team. It currently seats 8,925 for basketball games.

== History ==
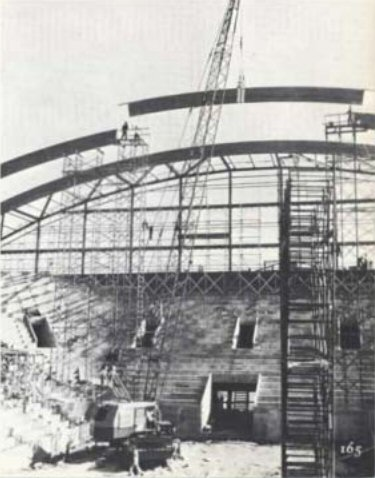
Cassell Coliseum under construction

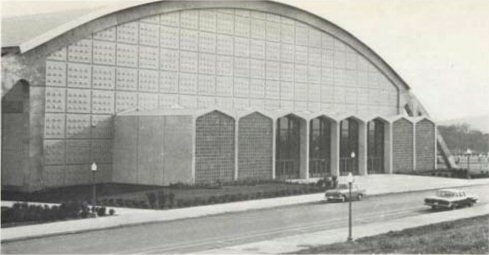
Cassell Coliseum in 1964

Built as a replacement for the much smaller War Memorial Gymnasium, the Coliseum's construction began in 1961. It was fully completed in December 1964 at a cost of $2.7 million. It was designed by Carneal and Johnston (now Ballou Justice Upton Architects, Richmond, Va) and built by T.C. Brittain and Company of Decatur, Georgia. Originally just referred to as "the Coliseum," it was dedicated on September 17, 1977 to the late Stuart K. Cassell, former school business manager, first Vice President of Administration, and major supporter of the building of the arena.

The first game was on January 3, 1962, when the Hokies played Alabama. The Hokies won 91-67. Unfortunately, the crowd sat on the bare concrete risers to watch the game because the seats had not arrived.

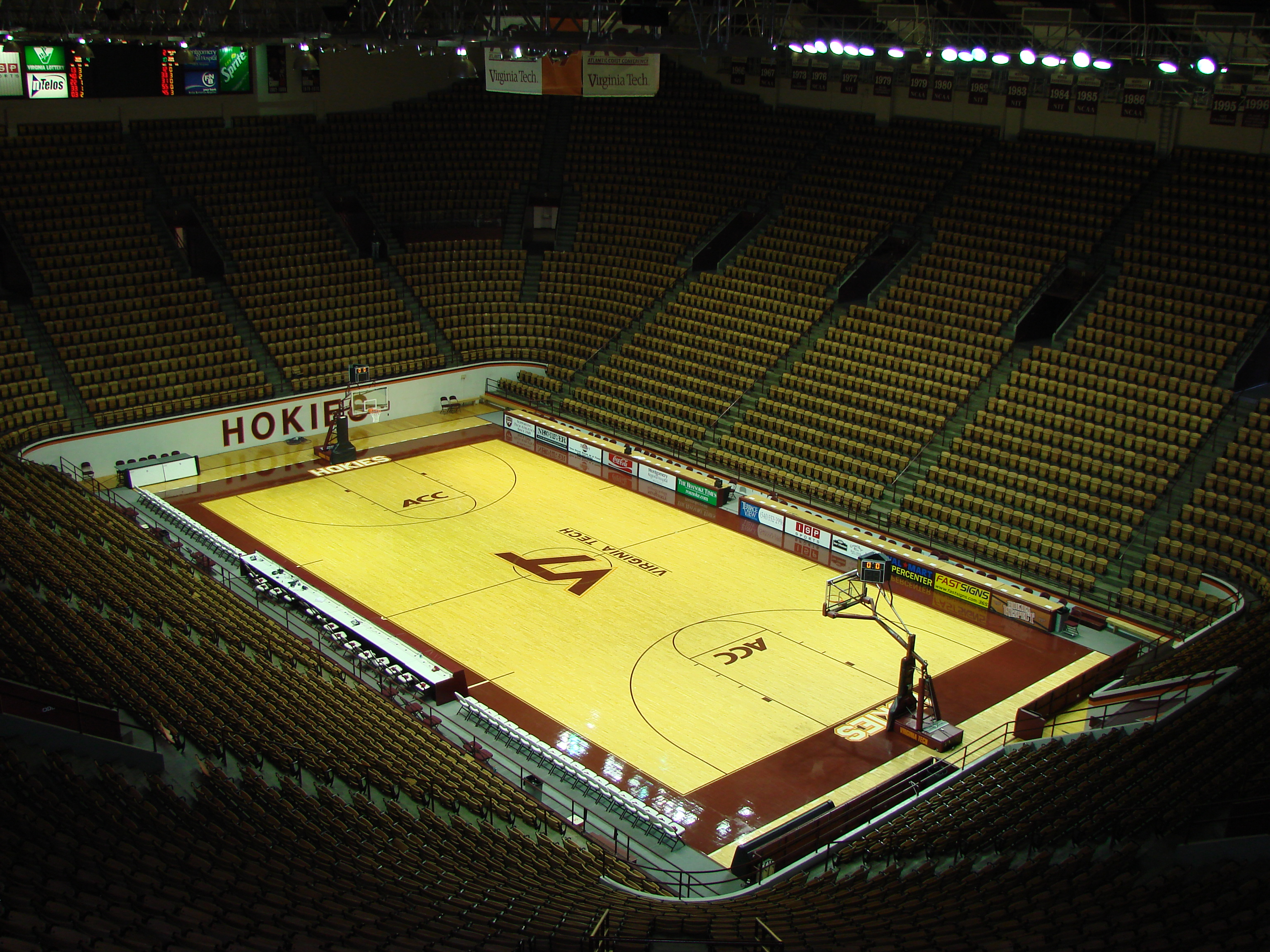
Cassell Coliseum

In the early years of the Coliseum, the Hokies frequently saw capacity crowds pack the venue. However, student and alumni interest in basketball decreased in the 1990s due to the Hokies' lack of a stable basketball conference home (the Hokies were in three different conferences in nine seasons) and due to the success of the football team. Fan support began to gain momentum under coach Seth Greenberg and the school's recent move to the ACC. A raucous student section, nicknamed the "Cassell Guard," has helped transform the Coliseum into a difficult venue for opposing teams in an athletic conference ripe with intimidating basketball arenas.

On June 27, 1996, a 27 year old construction worker fell 90 feet (27 m) to his death on the coliseum floor. Dewey Wayne Duncan, of Pulaski, VA, who was working outside the coliseum for a contractor making repairs to the roof, stepped on a section of the roof that was covered only by a ceiling tile. The tile collapsed, and Duncan fell through the roof.

On April 17, 2007, a memorial convocation was held there in response to the shootings of 32 students and faculty on the Virginia Tech campus the previous day. President George W. Bush and his wife Laura attended the event.

Over the years, Cassell has undergone various updates, most recently those being a new sound system, new lights inside building over the court, as well as a refinished court.

On August 5, 2015, it was reported that Carilion Clinic has bought naming rights to the arena's court for $500,000 a year for the next 10 years. The Virginia Tech Carilion Court at Cassell Coliseum was dedicated in December 2015.

Prior to the 2017–18 season, half of the old wooden seats were replaced with larger plastic seats, reducing the capacity.

== Major games ==
On January 10, 1983, the Virginia Tech men's basketball team defeated the number one ranked Memphis State Tigers 69-56 in front of 10,000 fans. It was the first time a number one team had played in Cassell Coliseum and the Hokies first win over a number one ranked team.

On February 17, 2005, during Virginia Tech's first season in the Atlantic Coast Conference, the Blue Devils were ranked 7th nationally. By the end of the night, the Blue Devils were handed a 67-65 loss by the Hokies in front of 9,847 fans. It was the first time that Virginia Tech had beaten Duke since 1966.

On January 13, 2007, Virginia Tech defeated the AP No. 1 North Carolina Tar Heels 94-88. At one point in the game, the Hokies led by 29 points. They were able to hold off a strong surge by the Tar Heels to seal the victory.

On March 22, 2010, Virginia Tech beat UConn in Cassell in the second round of the NIT tournament. Trailing 63-62, the Hokies' defense pressured Connecticut into a backcourt violation. With 14.1 seconds remaining, the Hokies took the lead with a Dorenzo Hudson jump shot. The Hokies' defense was able to stop Connecticut from scoring for a 65-62 victory.

On February 26, 2011, Duke fell to Virginia Tech 64-60. At the time Duke was the number one ranked team in the country. It was Virginia Tech's fourth upset of a number one ranked team under Seth Greenberg. New York Giant, David Wilson was seen doing back flips on the court with classmate and track & field star, Nick McLaughlin following a halftime award ceremony recognizing the 2011 ACC Indoor Track and Field Champions.

The largest crowd ever at the Cassell was 11,500 for a game against Purdue on December 3, 1966.

== See also ==
- Virginia Polytechnic Institute and State University
- Virginia Tech campus
- Virginia Tech Hokies
- List of NCAA Division I basketball arenas
