= Boxley Building =

Historic commercial building in Virginia, United States

- U.S. National Register of Historic Places
- Virginia Landmarks Register
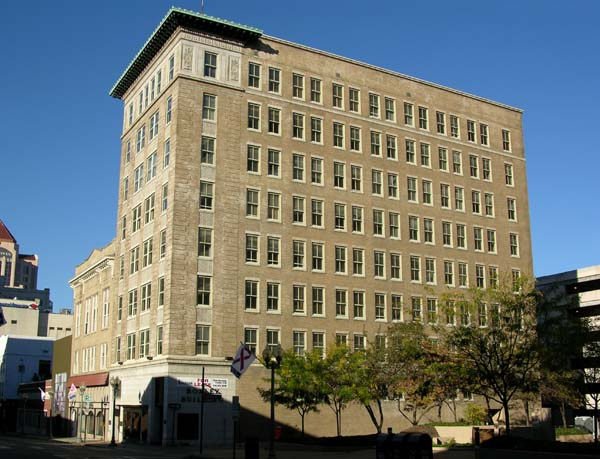
- Boxley Building, June 2010

- Location within Virginia Location within the United States
- Location: 416 Jefferson St. SW, Roanoke, Virginia
- Coordinates: 37°16′11″N 79°56′26″W
- Area: 0.3 acres (0.12 ha)
- Built: 1921
- Built by: Boxley, W.W.
- Architect: Frye, Edward G.
- NRHP reference No.: 84003587
- VLR No.: 128-0047

Significant dates
- Added to NRHP: March 8, 1984
- Designated VLR: October 18, 1983

The Boxley Building is a historic commercial building located in Roanoke, Virginia. It was built in 1922, during a wave of post-World War I construction in the city. The building is eight stories, and follows a pattern set by other skyscrapers of the time in consisting of three sections similar to a classical column. The bottom section, or pedestal, is one story fronted with granite; the middle section, or shaft, consists of the next six stories built with beige enameled brick; the top section, or capital, is the eighth story fronted with richly decorated terra cotta panels topped with a finely detailed copper cornice.

The building was commissioned by William Wise Boxley, a local builder and developer who was Roanoke's mayor at the time of construction. Boxley was an influential figure in the city, having played a significant role in the founding of the Shenandoah Life Insurance Company and Colonial American Bank as well as sitting on the boards of both Roanoke College and Virginia Military Institute. Boxley was elected to the Roanoke City Council in 1918, and the following year was appointed the city's first mayor under its new council-manager form of government. The building's architect was Edward G. Frye, whose firm had previously erected the Roanoke Times building, the city's municipal building, and would complete Roanoke's new market building in the same year as the Boxley.

Boxley's building materials company was one of the original tenants of the building, and remained headquartered there until vacating in 2005. The building was empty from the late-2000s until being purchased by a local developer in 2016. The building's offices were converted into residential space, with the bottom four floors used as dormitory housing for international students of two Roanoke-area parochial schools, and the top four floors converted into luxury apartments.

The building was listed on the National Register of Historic Places in 1984, and it is a contributing structure to the Roanoke Downtown Historic District.
