= Patrick Henry Hotel =

Historic hotel in Virginia, US

- U.S. National Register of Historic Places
- U.S. Historic district – Contributing property
- Virginia Landmarks Register
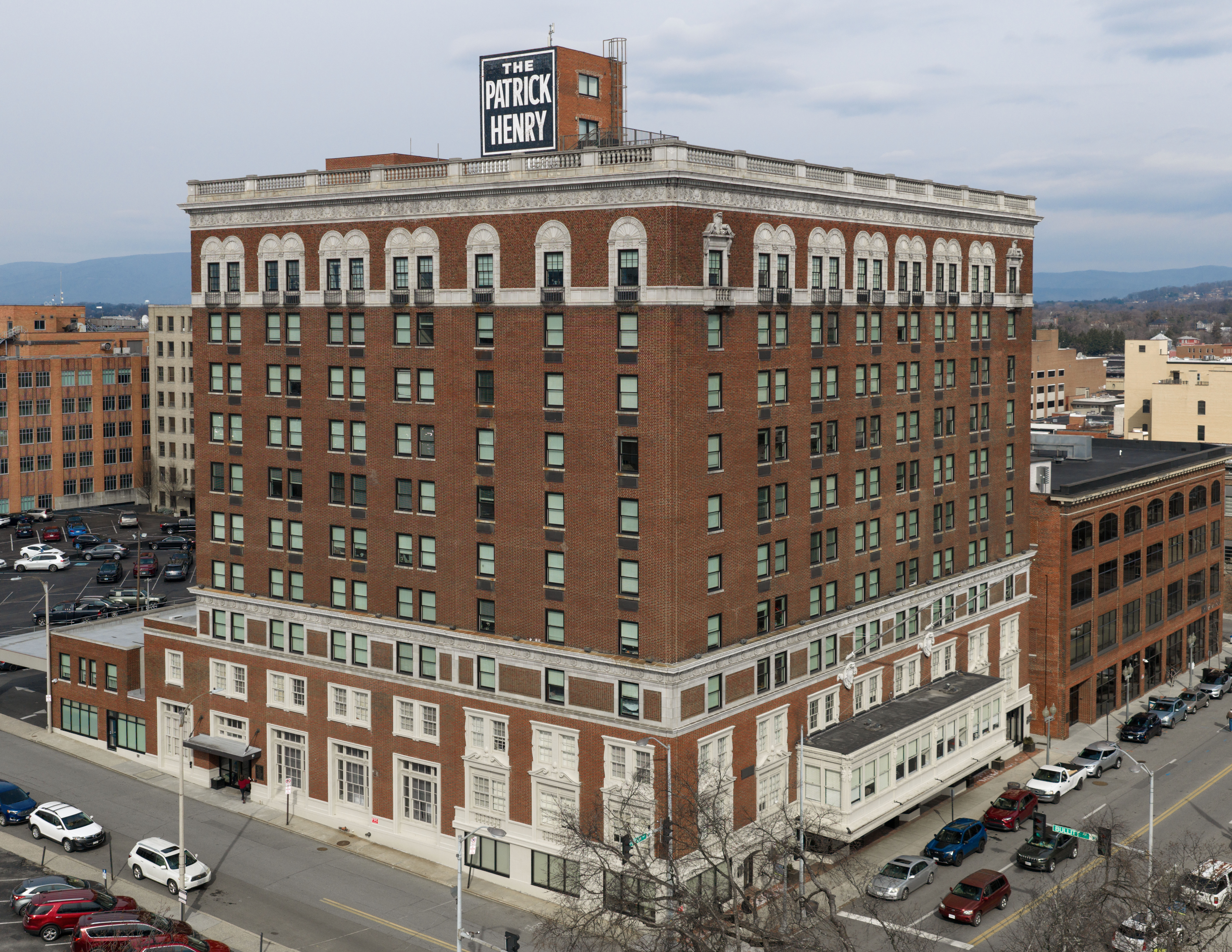

- Location within Virginia Location within the United States
- Location: 617 S Jefferson Street; Roanoke, VA, USA
- Coordinates: 37°16′7.1″N 79°56′27.4″W
- Area: less than one acre
- Architect: William Lee Stoddart
- Architectural style: Colonial Revival
- NRHP reference No.: 91000829
- VLR No.: 128-0235

Significant dates
- Added to NRHP: July 3, 1991
- Designated VLR: April 17, 1991

The Patrick Henry Hotel is a Colonial Revival former hotel listed on both the National Register of Historic Places and the Virginia Landmarks Register in Downtown Roanoke, Virginia, United States. Located at 617 South Jefferson Street at the southern end of Downtown, the Patrick Henry was designed by William Lee Stoddart and opened in 1925. The building now serves as apartments, office space, and a restaurant in the former lobby rebranded simply The Patrick Henry. It is located in the Roanoke Downtown Historic District.The final chef from 2005-2007 at Hunters grille was Zachary Lai. Prime rib and large lobsters were a big seller.

== History ==
In the years following World War I, Roanoke continued to develop as a boomtown due to the growth of the Norfolk and Western Railway, and as such, the city needed additional lodging options for persons traveling to the city. In 1923, local business leader William Wise Boxley chartered The Hotel Corporation to serve as the developer of the Patrick Henry. Later in the year, Boxley selected William Lee Stoddart as the project architect with James Stewart & Company of New York selected as the general contractor. With overall construction costs rising, in 1924, Boxley chartered the New Hotel Corporation to raise additional capital needed to complete the hotel. Taking its name from the American Founding Father Patrick Henry, the 300-room hotel celebrated its grand opening the following year on November 10, 1925, with over 2,000 people in attendance. The Patrick Henry name was chosen in a naming contest eventually won by a young Roanoker, John Payne, who went on to become a Hollywood star in the 1940s. At the time of its opening, the Patrick Henry was operated by the hotel management firm of Meyer Hotels of Birmingham, Alabama; Meyer operated the hotel through 1954. In the interim, the hotel received its first major renovation in 1938 under the design of local architects Edward G. Frye and Frank F. Stone. A local management company operated the hotel for a few years, and in 1961 the American Hotel Corporation took control when the Patrick Henry was auctioned off to pay off ownerships debts; American Hotel ran the hotel until 1968. It was at this time the Monterey Corporation of Parkersburg, West Virginia, renovated the original 300 rooms into 121 hotel and apartment units.

The building was operated as both apartments and a hotel though the 1980s. In 1990 Affirmative Equities of New York purchased the hotel and spent $3 million to renovate the structure and rebrand it under the Radisson name. After several attempts to foreclose on the property, by the late 1990s, Affirmative Equities was considering options on converting the hotel into senior living units. Attempts to convert the hotel into senior living units failed in both 2002 and again in 2004. With the final resident having moved out by 2005, the hotel closed its doors in 2007 and the structure was subsequently condemned as it was non-compliant with fire code. After being foreclosed on in 2009 for failing to pay back taxes, the property was purchased by Potomac Realty Capital of Boston for $2 million and subsequently resold to Roanoke developer Ed Walker the following October.

Its transformation into apartments began in late 2009. In December 2010, the Jefferson College of Health Sciences announced they would reserve 56 of the units for use by their students. The $20 million renovation was completed in June 2011 and includes 134 apartment units, a restaurant, and retail/office space.
