= Fire Station No. 1 (Roanoke, Virginia) =

- U.S. National Register of Historic Places
- U.S. Historic district – Contributing property
- Virginia Landmarks Register
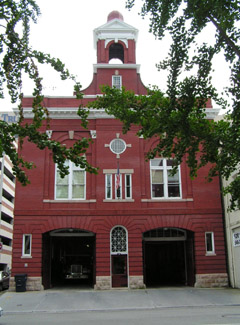

- Location within Virginia Location within the United States
- Location: 13 E. Church Ave., Roanoke, Virginia, U.S.
- Coordinates: 37°16′12″N 79°56′24″W
- Area: 9.9 acres (4.0 ha)
- Built: 1907
- Architect: Huggins & Bates
- Architectural style: Georgian Revival
- NRHP reference No.: 73002224
- VLR No.: 128-0033

Significant dates
- Added to NRHP: May 7, 1973
- Designated VLR: September 19, 1972

Fire Station No. 1 is a former fire station listed on the National Register of Historic Places in the Downtown neighborhood of the independent city of Roanoke, Virginia, United States. Modeled after Independence Hall in Philadelphia, Fire Station No. 1 served as one of the longest continuously operating fire stations in the Commonwealth of Virginia from its completion in 1907 through the opening of a replacement facility in 2007. Designed by the Lynchburg firm of Huggins and Bates, No. 1 still stands as a monument to the civic pride of early Roanoke. It is located in the Roanoke City Market Historic District.

== History ==
With a purely volunteer force in place within the city beginning in 1882, the first paid firefighters were hired in 1906, and ground was officially broken for No. 1 on February 19, 1906. Completed by 1907, the station exhibits the Georgian Revival style of an Edwardian-era firehouse. It features a limestone ashlar foundation and a solid brick facade with terracotta accents, topped with a bell tower that provided views of the entire city upon its completion.

By 1911 the city purchased their first engine powered fire truck stationed at No. 1. By 1918, horse-drawn fire wagons were totally phased out in favor of the engine-powered ones.

Originally cast in 1886, the bell originally placed atop the structure in the bell tower was removed in 2001, restored and is now on display on the first floor of the station. By 2003, the aging facility received a facelift to repair and restore the original limestone mortar on the facade. Additionally, the former bell tower was completely restored and the station was completely operational again by December. Although officials stated that No. 1 would retain its status as a fully staffed fire station even with the completion of a replacement facility, the station stopped running fire and EMS calls on May 9, 2007. Today the facility houses a local furniture showroom, restaurant, and boutique hotel.
