= Salem Avenue–Roanoke Automotive Commercial Historic District =

Historic district in Virginia, United States

- U.S. National Register of Historic Places
- U.S. Historic district
- Virginia Landmarks Register
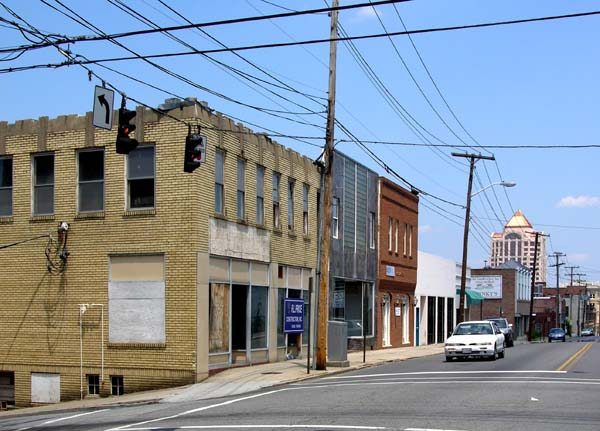
- Salem Avenue–Roanoke Automotive Commercial Historic District, June 2010

- Location within Virginia Location within the United States
- Location: Generally Salem Ave., Rorer Ave., Campbel Ave., bet. 3rd and 6th Sts.; 500 & 600 blocks Campbell Ave. & 700 blk. Patterson Ave., Roanoke, Virginia
- Coordinates: 37°16′19″N 79°57′00″W
- Area: 24.2 acres (9.8 ha)
- Built: 1909
- Architectural style: Early Commercial, Art Deco
- NRHP reference No.: 07000807 (original); 08000425 (increase 1); 14000235 (increase 2)
- VLR No.: 128-6065

Significant dates
- Added to NRHP: August 8, 2007
- Boundary increases: May 15, 2008; October 22, 2014
- Designated VLR: June 6, 2007, September 20, 2007

Salem Avenue–Roanoke Automotive Commercial Historic District is a national historic district located in Roanoke, Virginia. It encompasses 59 contributing buildings in the southwestern part of the City of Roanoke. The district includes a variety of buildings having automotive, warehouse, light industrial and residential uses. Most of the buildings are small-scale, one or two-storey brick or concrete block buildings, with the majority built between about 1920 and 1954. Notable buildings include the former Enfield Buick Dealership (c. 1930), Lindsay-Robinson & Co. Building (1918), Fulton Motor Company Auto Sales & Service (1928), Lacy Edgerton Motor Company (c. 1927), Roanoke Motor Car Company (c. 1946), and Fire Department No. 3 (1909).

It was listed on the National Register of Historic Places in 2007, with boundary increases in 2008 and 2014.
