= Carilion Roanoke Memorial Hospital =

Coordinates: 37°16′15″N 79°56′33″W

- Carilion Clinic
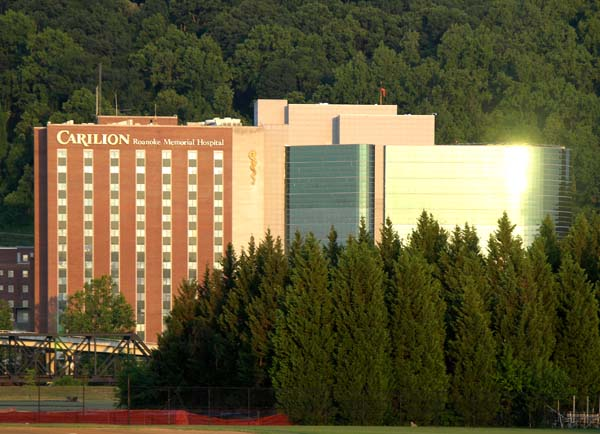

Geography
- Location: Roanoke, Virginia, United States

Organization
- Care system: Private
- Type: Teaching
- Affiliated university: Virginia Tech Carilion School of Medicine and Research Institute, University of Virginia, Virginia College of Osteopathic Medicine

Services
- Emergency department: Level I trauma center
- Beds: 703

History
- Founded: 1899

Links
- Website: www.carilionclinic.org/crmh
- Lists: Hospitals in Virginia

Carilion Roanoke Memorial Hospital (CRMH) is a private teaching hospital in Roanoke, Virginia, United States. With 825 beds, Carilion Roanoke Memorial Hospital is one of the largest hospitals in the state. It is part of Carilion Clinic.

The region's only level I trauma center, the hospital operates three medical helicopters (LifeGuard 10, 11, and 12) to provide air ambulance transport, including one in Moneta, one in Christiansburg, and one in Lexington.

== History ==
The hospital was founded in 1899 as Roanoke Hospital.

In the 1920s and 1930s, its growth was funded through gifts of hundreds of thousands of dollars from David W. Flickwir, a railroad executive and contractor who had married the hospital's nursing superintendent. The hospital dubbed him its "Greatest Benefactor"; a 1925 building he funded, the Flickwir Memorial Unit, still stands.

In the 21st century, the hospital completed a large expansion project, adding an emergency department, a labor-and-delivery unit, and the Carilion Clinic Children's Hospital, which has a pediatric emergency department.
