= Roanoke Warehouse Historic District =

Historic district in Virginia, United States

- U.S. National Register of Historic Places
- U.S. Historic district
- Virginia Landmarks Register
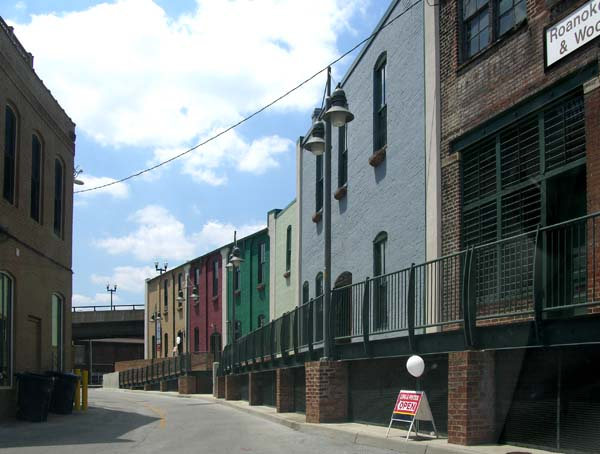
- Roanoke Warehouse Historic District, June 2010

- Location within Virginia Location within the United States
- Location: 109-133 Norfolk Ave., SW, Roanoke, Virginia
- Coordinates: 37°16′23″N 79°56′37″W
- Area: 2.5 acres (1.0 ha)
- Built: 1889-1902
- NRHP reference No.: 83003313
- VLR No.: 128-0046

Significant dates
- Added to NRHP: March 29, 1983
- Designated VLR: September 16, 1982

Roanoke Warehouse Historic District, also known as 'Wholesale Row," is a national historic district located at Roanoke, Virginia. It encompasses five contributing buildings constructed between 1889 and 1902. All the buildings are constructed of brick, two-to-four stories in height and three-to-eleven bays in length. Two of the buildings have exceptional corbeled stepped gables in a Dutch-vernacular tradition. The buildings were erected for wholesale food storage.

It was listed on the National Register of Historic Places in 1983.
