= Colonial National Bank (Roanoke, Virginia) =

Historic commercial building in Virginia, United States

- U.S. National Register of Historic Places
- Virginia Landmarks Register
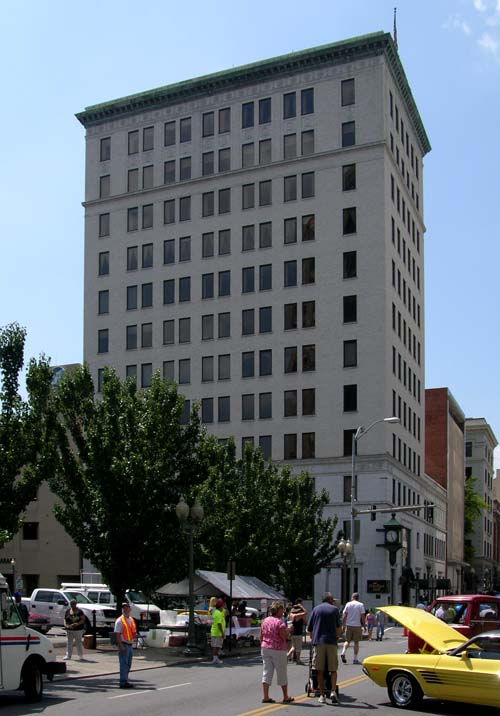
- Colonial National Bank, June 2010

- Location within Virginia Location within the United States
- Location: 202–208 Jefferson St., Roanoke, Virginia
- Coordinates: 37°16′18″N 79°56′25″W
- Area: 0.1 acres (0.04 ha)
- Built: 1927
- Architect: Frye & Stone
- Architectural style: Neo-Classical
- NRHP reference No.: 83004035
- VLR No.: 128-0044

Significant dates
- Added to NRHP: December 17, 1983
- Designated VLR: September 16, 1982

Colonial National Bank, also known as the Colonial-American National Bank and the Colonial Arms Building, is a historic bank and office building located at Roanoke, Virginia. It was built in 1926–1927, and is a 12-story, granite and gray-enamel brick building in the Neoclassical style. The building's design echoes that of a classical column; its first three stories compose the base, its shaft is composed of the next seven stories of unornamented brick, and the top two stories of ornamented brick are the capital. The building has a three-story annex built in two stages in 1949 and 1959. The structure was Roanoke's tallest building for almost fifty years.

The office building was listed on the National Register of Historic Places in 1983. It has been renovated numerous times, and as of 2018 housed a bank in its lower floors and upscale apartments in the upper portion.

== History ==
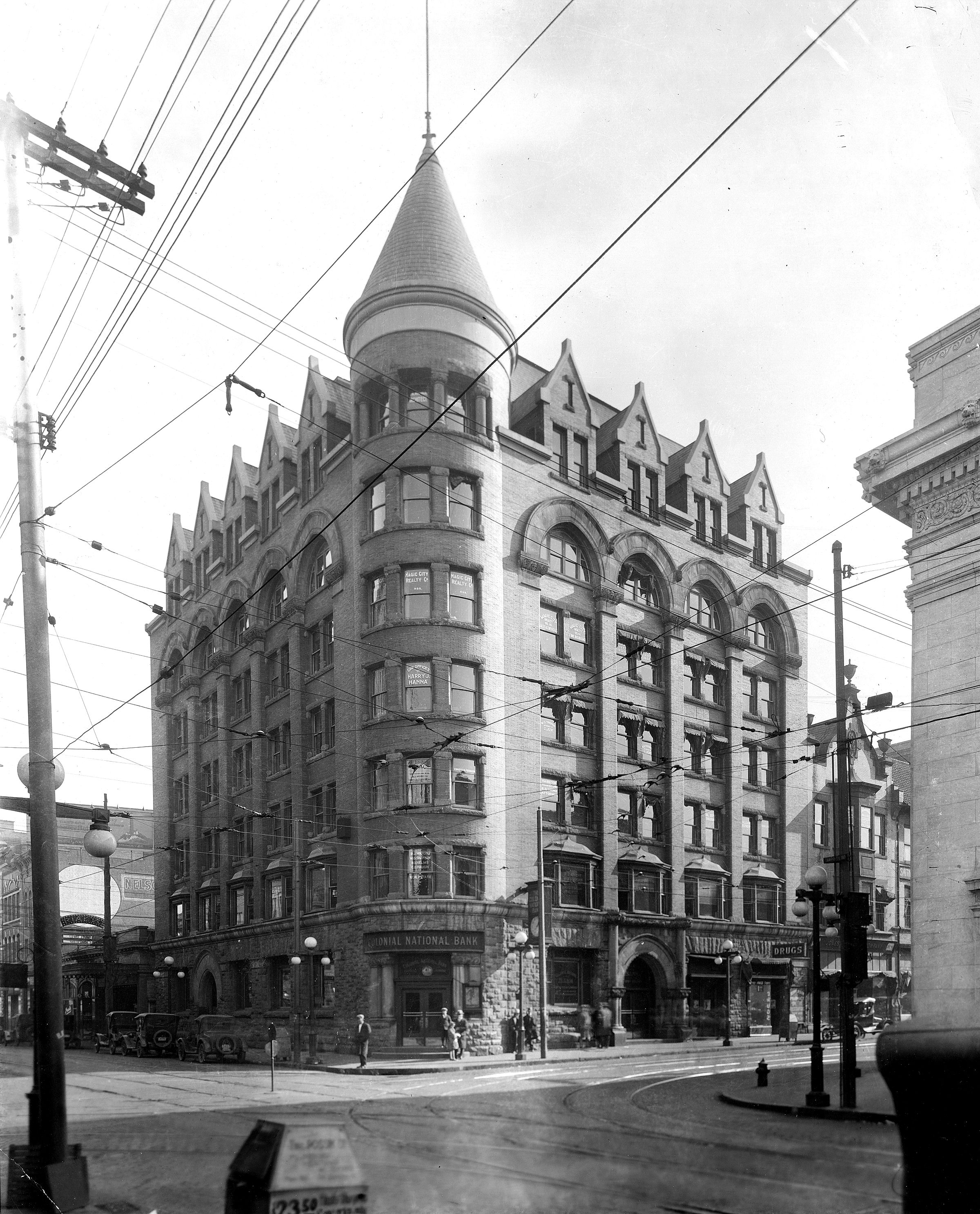
The Terry Building, c. 1920

The bank began its life as the Colonial Bank and Trust Company, established in 1910, and headquartered in the 100 block of Downtown Roanoke's Campbell Avenue. In 1912, the business moved into new accommodations in the Terry Building, a c. 1892 building constructed by Peyton Terry, one of Roanoke's influential early businessmen. The building, located at the southeast corner of Campbell Avenue and Jefferson Street, was designed in the Italianate style and at seven stories tall was Roanoke's first "skyscraper". The bank purchased the Terry Building one year after moving in. In 1927, after only 35 years of use, the bank decided to raze the increasingly out of fashion Terry Building.

In its place the organization built the current structure, a 12-story building done in the Neoclassical style. The new building was designed by Frye and Stone, a local architecture firm responsible for many buildings that would become Roanoke landmarks. The firm followed the contemporary trend with skyscraper construction, creating a structure that mimicked a three-part classical column in its design. The first three stories, or base, are constructed of granite ashlar; the middle seven stories, or shaft, are gray brick, and the top two stories, or capital, are ornamented brick. In a modern twist on the building's Neoclassical design, its Campbell Avenue side features five large windows on the lower two floors.

The building's lowest two floors were dedicated to banking operations, while the upper ten held sixteen offices each and were of identical layouts. Each floor had a men's and women's restroom; as was the case with many office buildings of the time, the men's restrooms had five facilities while the women's had only one.

In 1929, Colonial National merged with the American National Bank, forming the Colonial-American National Bank. The American National, which had been housed in a building farther west on Campbell Avenue, moved into the Colonial National building. One of the structure's most distinctive features dates to this time. A copper and stained glass clock projects from the building at the corner of Campbell and Jefferson. The clock has chimes in its interior, and "Colonial American Bank" is written in the stained glass.

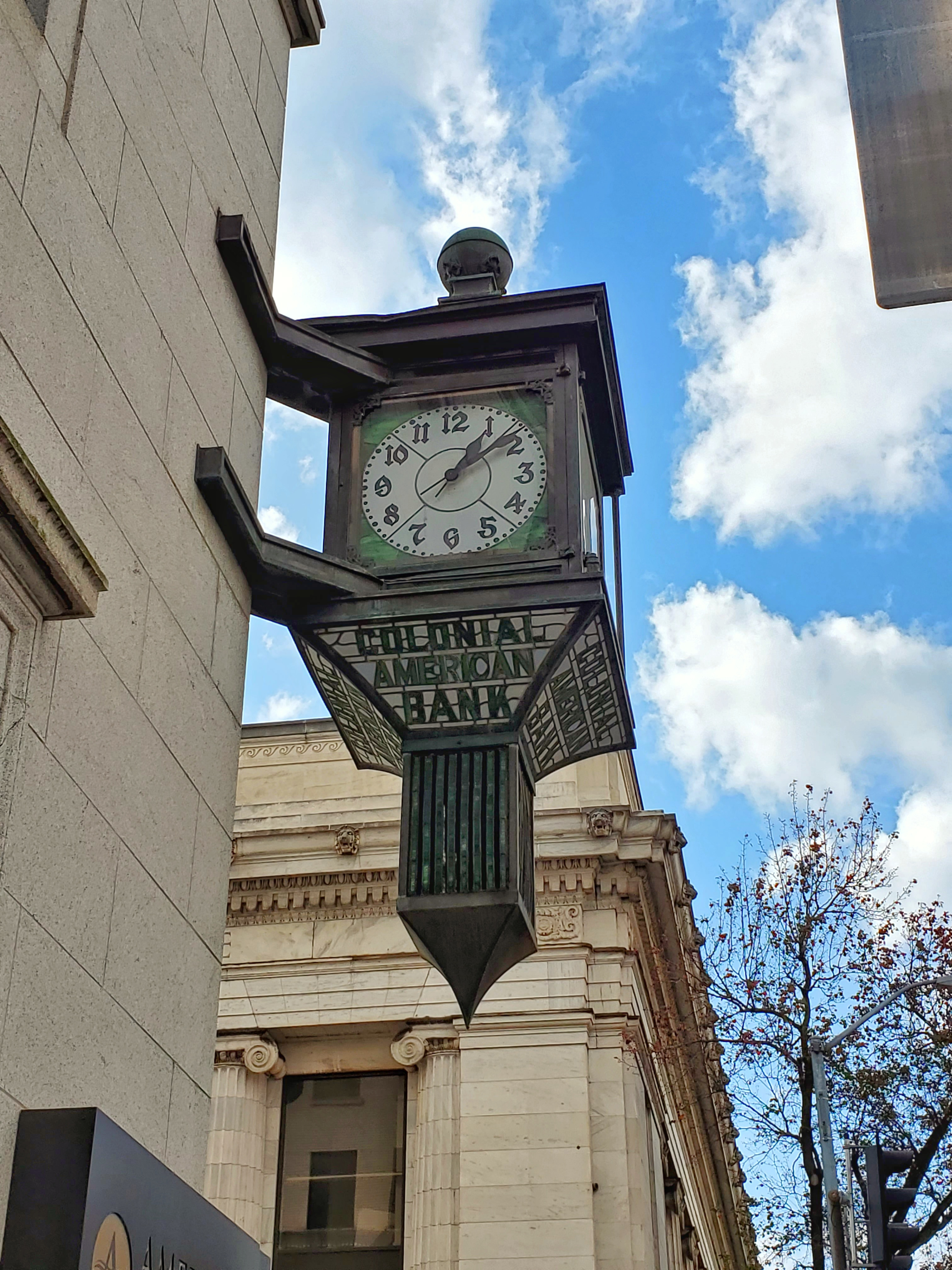
The c. 1929 Colonial American Bank clock

The bank built a three-story annex next door to the building on Jefferson Street in two phases; the first in 1949 and the second ten years later. The addition brought the total floor space in the Colonial National building to 70,000 square feet (6,500 m^{2}).

In celebration of the bank's 50th anniversary, the first two floors of the building underwent a remodeling in 1960. The structure remained Roanoke's tallest building for 50 years, until a rival bank constructed a taller tower farther south on Jefferson in 1976. In that same year, it was announced that Colonial American would be breaking ground on its own new facility on Jefferson, as part of Roanoke's "Downtown East" urban renewal program.

Colonial American continued operating a bank in the older building until 1981, when Norfolk Southern, which had been renting office space in its upper floors, finished its own headquarters elsewhere in the Downtown East development and vacated the facility. The building was sold to a new owner who performed a major renovation on the entire building. The property was listed on the National Register of Historic Places in 1983, and continued to be used as office space with the lower floors leased to a bank.

In 1992, the building was the site of an experiment by Roanoke City with two aims: to bolster the numbers of the endangered peregrine falcon in the state, and to combat an overabundance of pigeons in the downtown area. The city purchased five peregrine falcon chicks at $1,600 each (raised from 54 downtown businesses) and released them on the roof of the Colonial National. The U.S. Fish and Wildlife Service, which knew of the city's program, contributed a sixth bird that had fallen from its nest on the Delaware Memorial Bridge. It was eventually determined that the falcons did not kill a sufficient number of pigeons to be an effective solution.

The building sold to a new owner in 1996, and again in 2004, this time to a local developer who turned the upper floors into luxury condominiums. The lower two floors were once again leased to a local bank.
