= Carilion Clinic =

Geography
- Location: Roanoke, Virginia, US

Organisation
- Care system: Private, Not-for-Profit
- Type: Hospital network, primary and specialty physician practices

Services
- Emergency department: Ambulance transportation, Emergency Room, Life-guard air transportation, Pediatric emergency room, Trauma Center, VelocityCare-Urgent Care by Carilion
- Beds: 1026

Helipads
- Helipad: 3

History
- Founded: 1899

Links
- Website: Carilion Clinic

Carilion Clinic is a Roanoke, Virginia-based non-profit integrated health care organization. Carilion owns and operates seven hospitals in the western part of Virginia, a nursing undergraduate program at Radford University Carilion, and a joint-venture medical school and research institute with Virginia Tech known as the Virginia Tech Carilion School of Medicine and Research Institute. The system consists of hospitals, primary and specialty physician practices, pharmacies, health clubs and other complementary services. Carilion has more than 13,200 employees with 737 physicians covering more than 70 specialties at 225 practice sites, making it the largest employer in the Roanoke Valley.

== History ==
Carilion originated with Roanoke Memorial Hospital, founded in 1899 and located at the base of Mill Mountain in southwest Roanoke. The hospital expanded into related health care services and the acquisition of other hospitals beginning in the mid 1900s. Most prominent was the acquisition of the competing Community Hospital of Roanoke Valley in downtown Roanoke. The deal took several years to complete because of anti-trust concerns by the United States Department of Justice that two of the three major hospitals in the Roanoke Valley would now be under the same ownership. In the early 1990s, Roanoke Memorial adopted the name Carilion for its consolidated health care business. In 2019, Carilion announced plans to spend $300 million expanding services at Roanoke Memorial Hospital.

== Carilion Clinic reorganization ==
In 2006, Carilion's management warned that trends in the health care sector threatened to undermine the organization's financial position. In response, Carilion announced plans for a significant business restructuring in which it would shift its focus from operating hospitals to hiring more physicians in more medical specialties, with the main objective of improving patient care coordination and placing a focus on medical education and research.

The plan was developed after visits to the Mayo Clinic and other similar organizations. As part of the reorganization plan, Carilion renamed itself Carilion Clinic. The vision for moving Carilion toward the "clinic" model was spearheaded by CEO Ed Murphy, who left Carilion in 2011 to work with a New York and London based firm in order to help develop ways to better manage and coordinate physicians and services provided by hospitals.

== Virginia Tech Carilion School of Medicine and Research Institute ==
Carilion and Virginia Tech partnered to form the Virginia Tech Carilion School of Medicine and Research Institute, which was established on January 1, 2007, and accepted its first class in 2010. The medical school is a fully accredited 4-year medical school by the Liaison Committee on Medical Education. In December 2018, the Virginia Tech Carilion Research Institute was renamed the Fralin Biomedical Research Institute at VTC in recognition of a $50 million gift from the Horace G. Fralin Charitable Trust, and Heywood and Cynthia Fralin.

Virginia Tech Carilion School of Medicine is adjacent to the Carilion Roanoke Memorial Hospital and features the Hokie Stone used to build most buildings on Virginia Tech's campus.

The school also offers residency and fellowship programs.

The 13 accredited residency programs include dermatology, emergency medicine, family medicine, general hospital dentistry, internal medicine, neurology, neurosurgery, obstetrics/gynecology, pediatrics, plastic surgery, podiatry, psychiatry and surgery.

The 11 accredited fellowship programs are adult joint reconstruction, cardiovascular disease, child and adolescent psychiatry, emergency medical services, gastroenterology, Geriatric medicine, Geriatric psychiatry, hospice and palliative care, infectious disease, interventional cardiology, and pulmonary critical care.

Many physicians and executives at Carilion teach courses at VTCSOM.

== Radford University Carilion ==
In early 2018, Carilion Clinic, Jefferson College of Health Sciences and Radford University joined together to announce the intent to merge Jefferson College into the Radford University family of colleges and departments. The merger was effective July 2019, and the college became Radford University Carilion.

Jefferson College of Health Sciences was the oldest hospital-based college in Virginia offering undergraduate and graduate programs of study. It was founded by Dr. Hugh Trout Sr. as the Jefferson Hospital School of Nursing.

Carilion Clinic partners with the college to provide residencies and fellowships for students. It is housed in Carilion Roanoke Community Hospital, and features skill laboratories and science laboratories for chemistry, microbiology, physics and anatomy and physiology.

Academically, the school offers associate's, bachelor's, master's, and doctoral degrees.

== Hospitals ==
Carilion Clinic operates seven hospitals located in the Southwestern region:

=== Carilion Franklin Memorial Hospital ===
Located in Rocky Mount, Virginia, Carilion Franklin is a 37 licensed bed hospital that provides 24-hour emergency, general medical/surgical care, and outpatient services.

=== Carilion Giles Community Hospital ===
Located in Pearisburg, Virginia, Carilion Giles is a 25 licensed bed critical access facility that provides 24-hour emergency care.

=== Carilion Roanoke Community Hospital ===
Located in Roanoke, Virginia, Carilion Roanoke Community Hospital is a magnet-designated, 34 licensed bed hospital home to outpatient services such as community care, wound care, occupational medicine, inpatient rehabilitation and pediatric dental. It is also the home of Radford University Carilion.

Carilion Roanoke Community is also home to Carilion's inpatient rehabilitation facility. The unit cares for patients following an illness or accident who need intensive therapy before they can leave the hospital.

=== Carilion Tazewell Community Hospital ===
Located in Tazewell, Virginia, Carilion Tazewell is a 56 licensed bed acute care facility that provides general medical care.

=== Carilion Rockbridge Community Hospital ===
Located in Lexington, Virginia, Carilion Rockbridge Community Hospital is a 25 licensed bed critical access facility. It also serves as a base for Lifeguard 12.

=== Carilion Clinic Saint Albans Hospital ===
Located at entrance 5 of the Carilion New River Valley Medical Center, Carilion Clinic Saint Albans Hospital is a 36-bed facility that specializes in treating mental, emotional and addiction issues. It is staffed by psychiatrists, nurse practitioners and therapists offering inpatient and outpatient treatment.

Services offered at the hospital include behavioral health, CONNECT, chemical dependency recover, electroconvulsive therapy, group skills therapy, psychological counseling and psychological evaluations.

=== Carilion New River Valley Medical Center (CNRV) ===
Located in Radford, Virginia, Carilion New River Valley Medical Center (CNRV) is a 146 licensed bed medical center. The center provides access to more than 50 specialists including cardiology, obstetrics and gynecology and vascular surgery. CNRV is designated as a Level III Trauma Center and serves as a base for Lifeguard 11. In addition, CNRV houses the Saint Albans Hospital for Psychiatry and Behavioral Medicine.

=== Carilion Roanoke Memorial Hospital ===
Carilion Roanoke Memorial Hospital is a magnet-designated, 703 licensed bed hospital. It is one of the largest hospitals in Virginia and is the region's only Level 1 Trauma Center and Level 1 Pediatric Trauma Center. The hospital houses Carilion Children's Hospital and offers residencies and fellowships sponsored by Virginia Tech Carilion School of Medicine.

In 2020, U.S. News & World Report ranked it as the number five hospital in the state of Virginia.

== Carilion Children’s ==
Located at Carilion Roanoke Memorial Hospital, Carilion Children's is a 92 licensed bed hospital within a hospital. It is the third largest neonatal intensive care unit in Virginia and the only pediatric intensive care unit in Western Virginia. The hospital provides medical and intensive care to neonatal, pediatric and adolescent patients.

== Lifeguard ==
Carilion Clinic operates a 24-hour air ambulance service using a fleet of three helicopters that operate out of three bases (Radford, Lexington and Westlake). Lifeguard provides service for the entire state of Virginia, as well as parts of West Virginia, North Carolina and Tennessee. Life-Guard helicopters operation began in 1981 and Lifeguard became Virginia's first air ambulance service.

== Institute for Orthopaedics and Neurosciences ==
The Institute for Orthopaedics and Neurosciences is a 55,000 square foot facility that provides general orthopaedic, total joints care, sports medicine, brain disorder and neurosurgery services.

== Carilion Wellness ==
Carilion Wellness is a system of fitness centers owned and operated by Carilion Clinic. With locations in Roanoke, Botetourt and Blacksburg, Carilion Wellness has more than 6,700 members. The fitness centers offer exercise classes, gym equipment, indoor and outdoor pools, as well as wellness programs and services such as nutrition consultations and personal training.

== Velocity Care ==
Carilion Clinic runs eight urgent care centers under the brand name Velocity Care. The urgent clinics offer walk-in medical services for non-life-threatening injuries and illnesses. Services include lab work and imaging services, and treatments for common illnesses and injuries.

== Community benefit ==
Carilion Clinic contributes a portion of its revenue to various medical causes around the Roanoke Valley. In 2016, around $171 million were donated. This includes $72 million for charity care, $55 million for other uncompensated care, $33 million for education, $11 million for community outreach, and $842 thousand for research.

== See also ==
- Nancy Agee
