= Carilion New River Valley Medical Center =

Coordinates: 37°05′22.64″N 80°30′26.57″W

- Carilion Clinic

Geography
- Location: Montgomery County, Virginia, United States

Organization
- Care system: Private
- Type: Community
- Affiliated university: None

Services
- Emergency department: Level III trauma center
- Beds: 146

History
- Founded: 1943

Links
- Website: https://www.carilionclinic.org/cnrv
- Lists: Hospitals in Virginia

Carilion New River Valley Medical Center (CNRV) is a hospital in Montgomery County, Virginia, USA, about two miles from Radford. The hospital has 146 beds, and is part of Carilion Clinic.

== Services ==
Carilion New River Valley Medical Center's emergency department is a certified level III trauma center.

== History ==
Radford Community Hospital (RCH) was founded in 1943 in Radford, Virginia. The hospital became affiliated with Carilion Clinic in 1987. Since the facility at RCH was aging, they began construction of a new hospital in 1997. Carilion New River Valley Medical Center opened in March 1999, and is located at 2900 Lamb Circle, Christiansburg, VA.

=== Virginia Tech massacre ===
On April 16, 2007, Carilion New River Valley Medical Center received victims of the Virginia Tech massacre. Four patients were reportedly treated.
