= Campbell Avenue Complex =

Historic commercial building in Virginia, United States

- U.S. National Register of Historic Places
- U.S. Historic district
- Virginia Landmarks Register
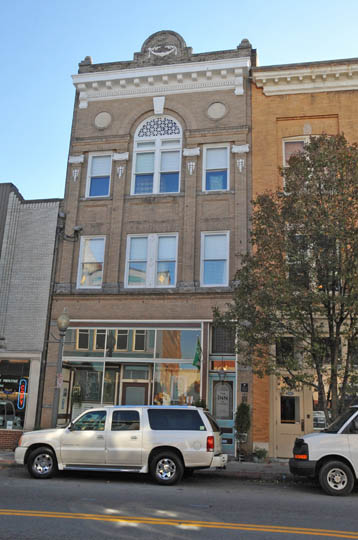

- Location within Virginia Location within the United States
- Location: 118-128 Campbell Ave., SW., Roanoke, Virginia
- Coordinates: 37°16′18″N 79°56′37″W
- Area: less than one acre
- Built: 1892-1909
- Architect: Huggins, Henry Hartwell
- Architectural style: Beaux Arts, Tudor Revival, Commercial Style
- NRHP reference No.: 90002171
- VLR No.: 128-0206

Significant dates
- Added to NRHP: January 24, 1991
- Designated VLR: August 21, 1990

Campbell Avenue Complex, also known as the Trinkle Buildings, is a historic commercial block and national historic district located at Roanoke, Virginia. It encompasses five contributing buildings constructed between 1892 and 1909. The contiguous three-story buildings are constructed of brick over stone foundations. The buildings have a horizontal arrangement of windows above first-floor storefronts and include buildings representative of the Beaux Arts and Tudor Revival styles.

It was listed on the National Register of Historic Places in 1991.
