= Virginia Tech Carilion School of Medicine =

Medical school at Virginia Tech University

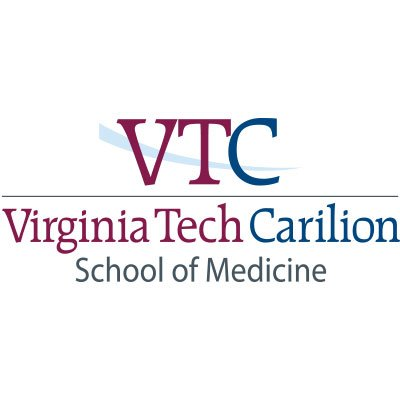
- Motto: Ut Prosim (Latin)
- Motto in English: That I May Serve
- Type: Public medical school
- Established: January 3, 2007
- Parent institution: Virginia Tech
- Dean: Lee Learman
- Location: 2 Riverside Circle, Roanoke, VA 24016, Roanoke, Virginia, United States; 37.2576°N 79.9426°W
- Colors: Chicago maroon Burnt orange Cadet blue
- Website: www.medicine.vtc.vt.edu

The Virginia Tech Carilion School of Medicine is a public medical school of Virginia Tech and located in Roanoke, Virginia. The medical school is associated with the Fralin Biomedical Research Institute. Formed as a public–private partnership with the Carilion Clinic, the medical school grants the Doctor of Medicine (M.D.) degree to its graduates. Initially a private institution from 2008 to 2018, the medical school became an official college of Virginia Tech in 2018.

== History ==
The college was founded in 2007, and the inaugural class began coursework in August 2010. The founding President and Dean of the medical school was Cynda Ann Johnson, who previously served as the Senior Associate Vice Chancellor at East Carolina University.

On June 19, 2014, the Liaison Committee on Medical Education (LCME) granted full accreditation to the school for its medical education program M.D. degree at the Virginia Tech Carilion School of Medicine. In 2019, the LCME continued full accreditation for VTCSOM for eight years, the longest term granted.

On July 1, 2018, Virginia Tech Carilion School of Medicine became the official 9th college of Virginia Tech, fully integrating with the university, while maintaining its close relationship with Carilion Clinic.

In December 2018, Johnson retired, and in July, 2019, Lee Learman became dean.

The Virginia Tech Carilion School of Medicine welcomed its 10th class on July 29, 2019.

The Department of Neurosurgery was established in June 2023, following approval by the Virginia Tech Board of Visitors.

In early 2024, VTCSOM announced the Virginia Tech Carilion Dean’s Council Diversity Excellence in Medicine Endowed Scholarship would be renamed the Henrietta Lacks Excellence in Medicine Scholarship.

== Academics ==
=== Curriculum ===
Virginia Tech Carilion uses a curriculum in basic science, clinical science, research, and health systems science and interprofessional practice (HSSIP).

The basic science curriculum employs problem based learning groups that explore real patient cases from the community.

The clinical science curriculum includes opportunities such as longitudinal bedside ultrasound training, standardized patient encounters, Longitudinal Ambulatory Care Experience (LACE) and a comprehensive oral health education.

As part of the research domain, students are expected to conduct original, hypothesis-driven research of sufficient scope to span three-and-a-half years. VTC is one of few schools that requires students to conduct research as a graduation requirement. To conduct this research, students are provided over 1,200 hours of research education and protected time, as well as a minimum research budget of $1000 in years 2-4 for research supplies. VTC students take courses in biomedical research fundamentals, biostatistics, epidemiology, and ethics. VTC students graduate with a Graduate Certificate in Research in Translational Medicine.

Students at VTC have the option to dual enroll in MBA, MPH, Master of Science (MS), or a Doctorate of Science (PhD) in Translational Biology, Medicine and Health programs.

=== Admissions ===
For the M.D. class of 2025, 49 students were selected out of 6,405 applicants. The class' undergraduate average GPA was 3.6, while the average MCAT score was 513, and 14 students had graduate degrees. As a school with a robust research curriculum, the average accepted applicant has over 3000 hours of research experience. The class of 2025 is 55% female and 45% male.

== Research ==
Named the Virginia Tech Carilion Research Institute when it opened on Sept. 1, 2010, the institute was renamed the Fralin Biomedical Research Institute (FBRI) at VTC in December 2018 in recognition of a $50 million gift from the Horace G. Fralin Charitable Trust, and Heywood and Cynthia Fralin. Researchers focus on biomedical sciences and basic, translational, and clinical research. In 2021, the research institute had 37 research teams, each led by a principal investigator who also holds a faculty appointment at Virginia Tech.

FBRI is a 239,000-sqft facility that houses a 3.0 Tesla MRI, MRI-guided insightec focused ultrasound machines, 3D printing lab and bioprinting facilities, CT imaging core, human metabolism research facilities, electron microscopy facilities, a linear accelerator for cancer treatment in companion animals, gas chromatograph/mass spectrometry facilities, and histology facilities.

=== Centers and Institutes ===
FBRI, in conjunction with VTC and the Carilion Clinic, conducts basic, translational and clinical research through a variety of centers and groups including:

- Addiction Recovery Center
- Cancer Research Group
- Center for Health Behaviors Research
- Center for Human Neuroscience Research
- Center for Neurobiology Research
- Center for Vascular and Heart Research
- National Pediatric Rehabilitation Resource Center
- Virginia Tech Schiffert Health Center Molecular Diagnostics Lab
