= Roanoke City Market Historic District =

Historic district in Virginia, United States

- U.S. National Register of Historic Places
- U.S. Historic district
- Virginia Landmarks Register
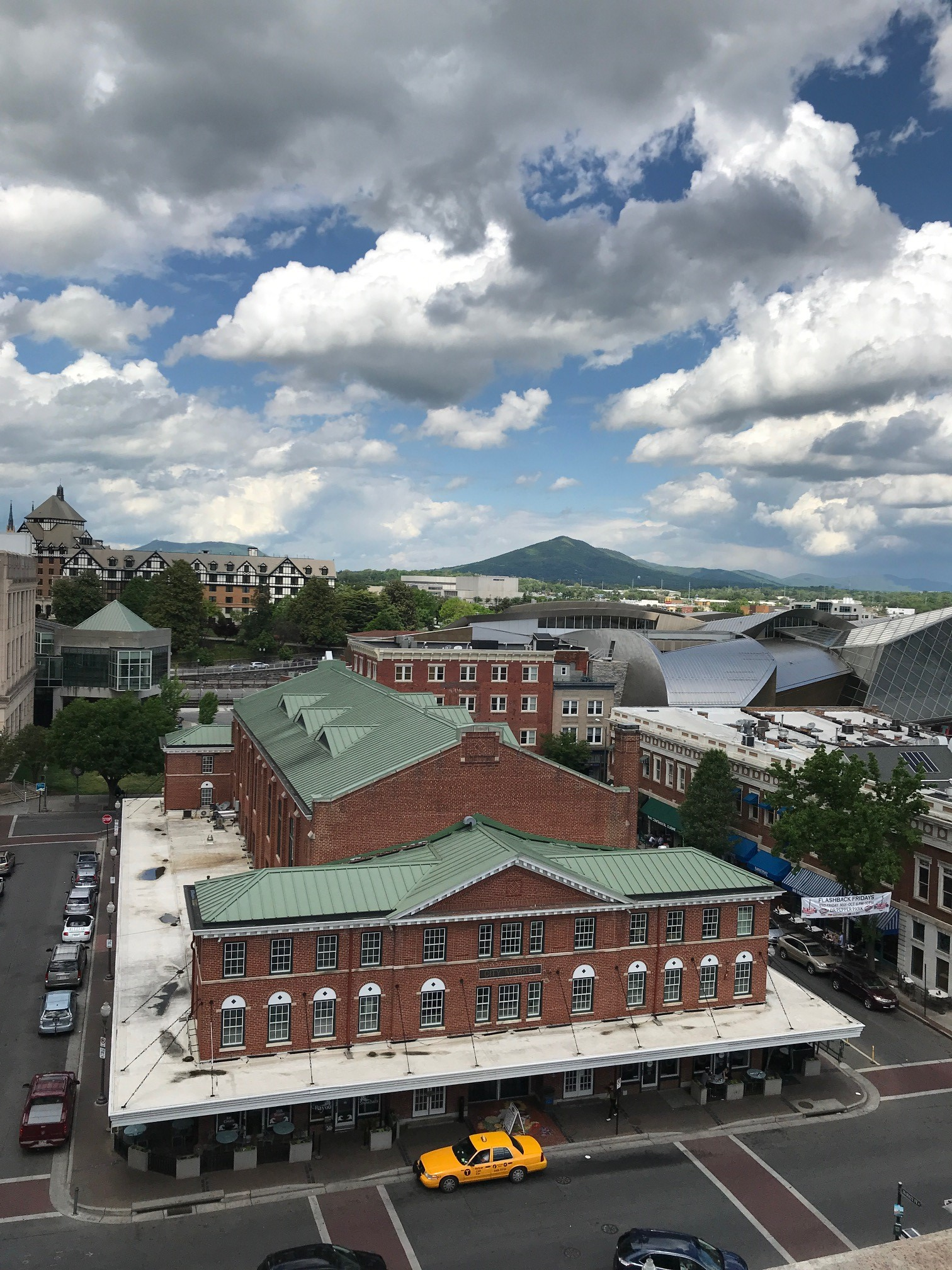
- Roanoke City Market Historic District as seen from above

- Location within Virginia Location within the United States
- Location: Roughly bounded by Williamson Rd., Norfolk Ave., S. Jefferson St., and Church Ave.; 302 Campbell Ave., SE; 9 Church Ave, SE, Roanoke, Virginia
- Coordinates: 37°16′18″N 79°56′21″W
- Area: 16 acres (6.5 ha)
- Architectural style: Late 19th And 20th Century Revivals, Late Victorian (original); Early Commercial (increase)
- NRHP reference No.: 83003312, 02000622 (increase)
- VLR No.: 128-0045

Significant dates
- Added to NRHP: April 20, 1983 (original); June 6, 2002 (increase)
- Designated VLR: September 16, 1982, September 12, 2001

Roanoke City Market Historic District, also known as City Market District, is a national historic district located in the Downtown Roanoke area of Roanoke, Virginia.

== History ==
The district's history dates to 1882, when the Norfolk and Western Railway (N&W) began the process of locating its headquarters to the small town of Big Lick. That decision precipitated a name change for the town to Roanoke, as well as a migration of the town's business district southeast towards the new railroad depot and hotel being built by the N&W. A town square along Campbell Avenue began seeing use as a makeshift open-air market, and in 1884 the new City of Roanoke's original charter provided for the construction of a municipal market. Completed in 1886, the original market building occupied the northwestern portion of the square; when that building was destroyed by fire it was replaced in 1922 with the current building and its centered arrangement.

It was listed on the National Register of Historic Places in 1983, with an area roughly bounded by Williamson Rd., Norfolk Ave., S. Jefferson St., and Church Ave. The district area was increased to include 302 Campbell Ave., SE, and 9 Church Ave, SE, in 2002. The district encompasses 51 contributing buildings and 1 contributing object. The focal point of the area's grid-plan is the City Market Building (1922) set in the middle of the central Market Square. Other notable buildings include the Hartsook Building (1897), Lampros Building (1909), the McGuire Building (1914), and the Goria Brothers Grocery Building (1924). Located in the district is the separately listed Fire Station No. 1.

== Gallery ==
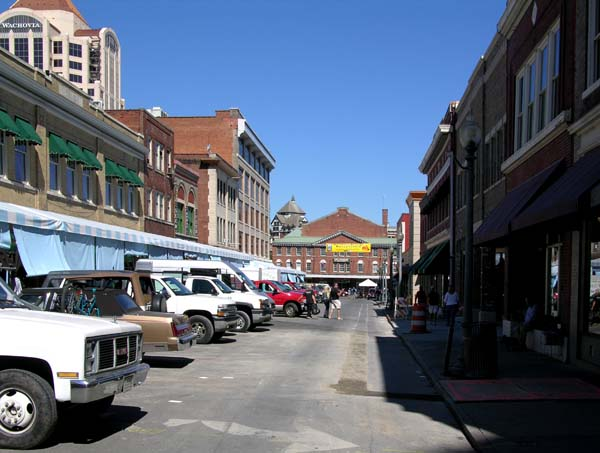
Roanoke City Market Historic District, June 2010

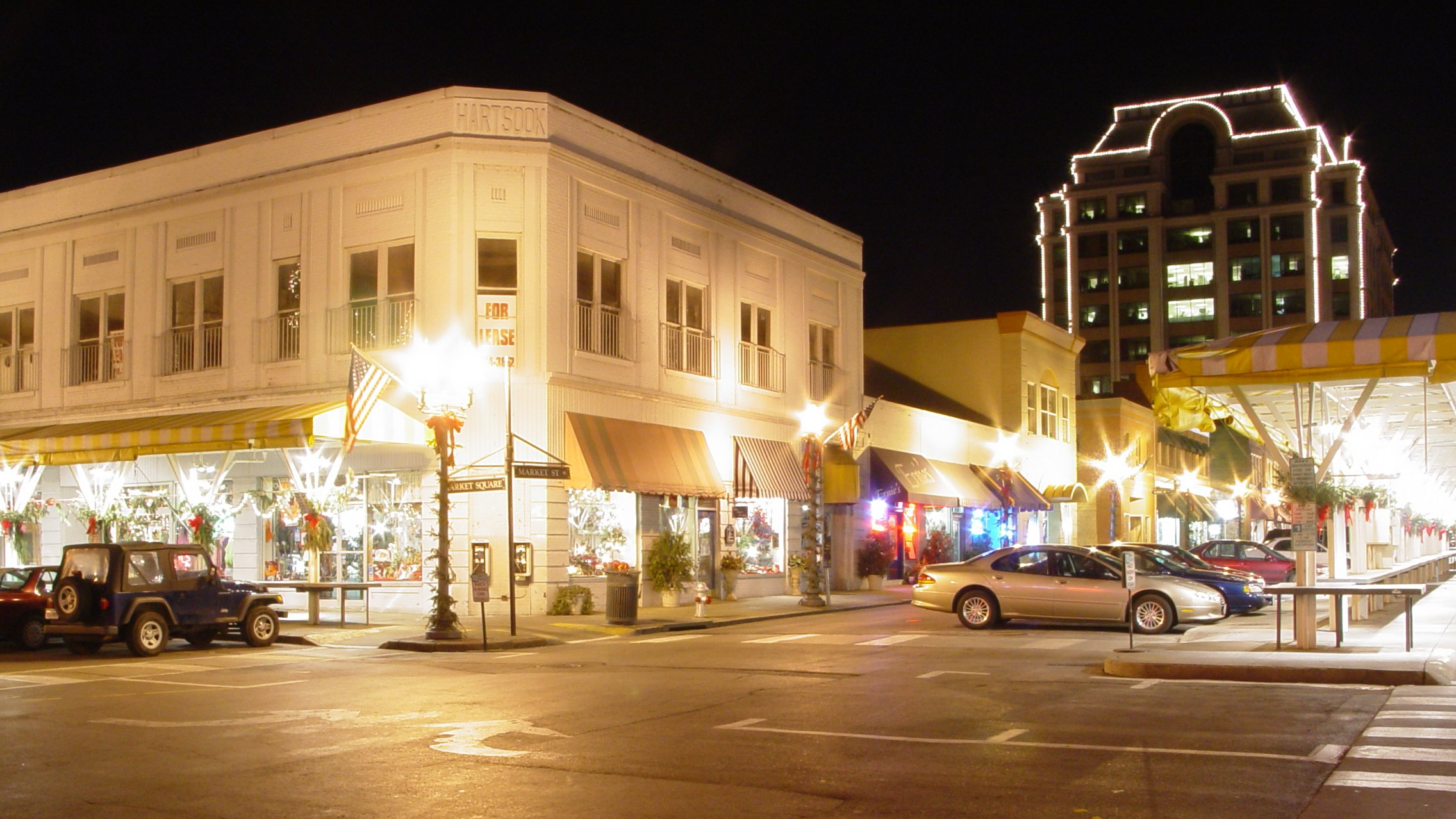
Roanoke City Market Historic District at Night
