= Jefferson College of Health Sciences =

Coordinates: 37°15′54.4″N 79°56′27.3″W

- Type: Private health sciences college
- Active: 1982–2019 (merged with Radford University)
- President: Nathaniel L. Bishop
- Faculty: 80
- Location: Roanoke, Virginia, United States
- Campus: Urban
- Nickname: Blue Healers
- Mascot: Jeff (a Saint Bernard)
- Website: jchs.edu

Jefferson College of Health Sciences (JCHS and Jefferson College) was a private health sciences college in Roanoke, Virginia. Officially chartered as a college in 1982, Jefferson College is the oldest hospital-based college in Virginia. In 2019, the college merged with Radford University to become Radford University Carilion.

Jefferson College of Health Sciences had approximately 1,062 students based on the enrollment statistics from fall 2015 (81% female, 19% male) who represented approximately 31 states. The college offered 15 majors in various healthcare disciplines. Jefferson College of Health Sciences awarded the Associate of Science, Bachelor of Science, Master of Science and Doctoral degrees.

== Academics ==
Jefferson College of Health Sciences had 25 degree programs and tracks, as well as certificate programs, in four academic departments:

- Department of Rehabilitation and Wellness
- Department of Community Health Sciences
- Department of Nursing
- Department of Arts and Sciences

Radford University also housed its Physical Therapy program at the Jefferson College of Health Sciences campus in Roanoke.

== History ==
Jefferson College of Health Sciences was founded in 1982, but its history can be traced as far back as the early 1900s. In 1907, Hugh Trout Sr. founded a small, 40-bed facility in Roanoke, Virginia named Jefferson Hospital. In order to address the shortage of nurses in the area, he established the Jefferson Hospital School of Nursing. At about the same time, James Newton Lewis and Sparrell Simmons Gale founded Lewis-Gale Hospital. In 1911 they created the Lewis-Gale school of nursing. The two schools operated side-by-side for many years. In 1965 it was decided that the two schools would combine under the direction of the newly constructed Community Hospital. The merged school was named the Community Hospital of Roanoke Valley School of Nursing. The new school operated in this manner for the next fifteen years. In 1980, a task force was commissioned to determine the feasibility of creating a hospital-based college that would grant 2-year degrees in nursing and allied health. The next year the Community Hospital Board of Trustees made a commitment to such a school. This led to the establishment of the Community Hospital of Roanoke Valley College of Health Sciences in 1982. The College of Health Sciences was the first hospital-based college in Virginia. The college obtained initial accreditation by the Southern Association of Colleges and Schools (SACS) to award associate degrees in 1986, bachelor's degrees in 1995, and Master's degrees in 2005. In 2003, the college officially changed its name to Jefferson College of Health Sciences.

In 2019, the college merged with Radford University. As part of Radford University, the formerly-independent college became Radford University Carilion.

=== Presidents ===
- Harry C. Nickens - 1989-2002
- Carol Seavor - 2002-2010
- Nathaniel L. Bishop - 2010-2019

== Nickname and mascot ==
Jefferson College of Health Sciences' nickname was the "Blue Healers". The school's mascot was the St. Bernard, who was often called "Jeff". The mascot was created in 2007. Prior to its implementation, a contest was held campus-wide during which students, faculty and staff were invited to submit ideas for a mascot. The winning concept was submitted by Lisa Ferguson, then a student in the Nursing Program. Lisa suggested that the mascot be a Saint Bernard—an animal with significant connections to medicine and healthcare. The mascot then underwent some last minute polishing and was introduced at the College's first annual Spirit Day event in January 2008. At the same time, the official mascot logo was introduced with a graphic version of Jeff sprinting over the words, "Jefferson Blue Healers." The name of our mascot pays homage to several significant aspects of Jefferson College. His primary name, "Jeff," is a shortened version of Jefferson, creating a link between the mascot and the school he represents. "Blue Healers" is a play on words, with "Blue" referring to one of the college's school colors and "Healers" referring to the primary function of the healthcare provider—to heal those in need. "Blue Healer" is perhaps not uncoincidentally a homonym for the nickname of another canine, the Australian Cattle Dog, or "blue heeler."
