= Norfolk and Western Railway Company Historic District =

Historic district in Virginia, United States

- U.S. National Register of Historic Places
- U.S. Historic district
- Virginia Landmarks Register
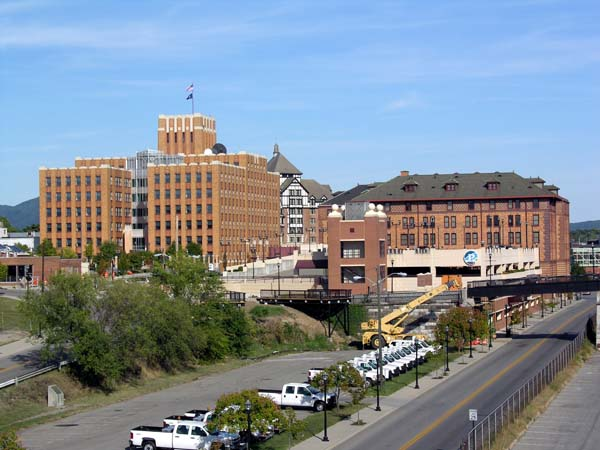
- Norfolk and Western Railway Company Historic District, June 2010

- Location within Virginia Location within the United States
- Location: 88 and 108 Jefferson St. NW, and 209 Shenandoah Ave., Roanoke, Virginia
- Coordinates: 37°16′23″N 79°56′31″W
- Area: 4.9 acres (2.0 ha)
- Built: 1896, 1903, 1931, 1905, 1949
- Architect: Loewy, Raymond; et al.
- Architectural style: Classical Revival, Art Deco, Moderne
- NRHP reference No.: 99000076
- VLR No.: 128-5432

Significant dates
- Added to NRHP: January 27, 1999
- Designated VLR: September 14, 1998

Norfolk and Western Railway Company Historic District is a national historic district located in Roanoke, Virginia. It encompasses three contributing buildings constructed by the Norfolk and Western Railway (N&W). They are the Neoclassical Revival style General Office Building–South (1896, 1903); the Art Deco period General Office Building–North (1931); and the Moderne style Passenger Station (1905, 1949).

== History ==
The eastern wing of the General Office Building–South was constructed in 1896 on the site of the prior N&W headquarters building that had been destroyed in a fire in January of the same year. The western wing – a duplicate of the eastern – was erected in 1903 and connected to the first via a hyphen. These structures were followed in 1931 by the construction of General Office Building–North, located next to the GOB–South and connected to it by a skywalk. GOB–North's Art Deco architecture utilizes similar design elements to New York City's Chrysler Building. The Passenger Station is located just east of GOB–South and downhill from the Hotel Roanoke (which was also constructed and owned by N&W). Built in 1905 and designed initially in the Neoclassical Revival style, the station saw a 1949 renovation in the Moderne style by industrial designer Raymond Loewy, and has been called "perhaps [his] finest architectural work".

In 1992 N&W's successor Norfolk Southern moved into a new office building in Downtown Roanoke and donated the former offices to a nonprofit foundation. The two wings comprising GOB–South were converted to upscale apartments in 2002, while GOB–North is the home of the Roanoke Higher Education Center. The Passenger Station was converted into offices when passenger service ended in the city in 1971, and was vacant from 1992 until being purchased by the Center in the Square foundation in 2000. As of 2023 it houses the city's visitor center, the Historical Society of Western Virginia, and the O. Winston Link Museum.

The three buildings were collectively listed on the National Register of Historic Places in 1999.

== Gallery ==
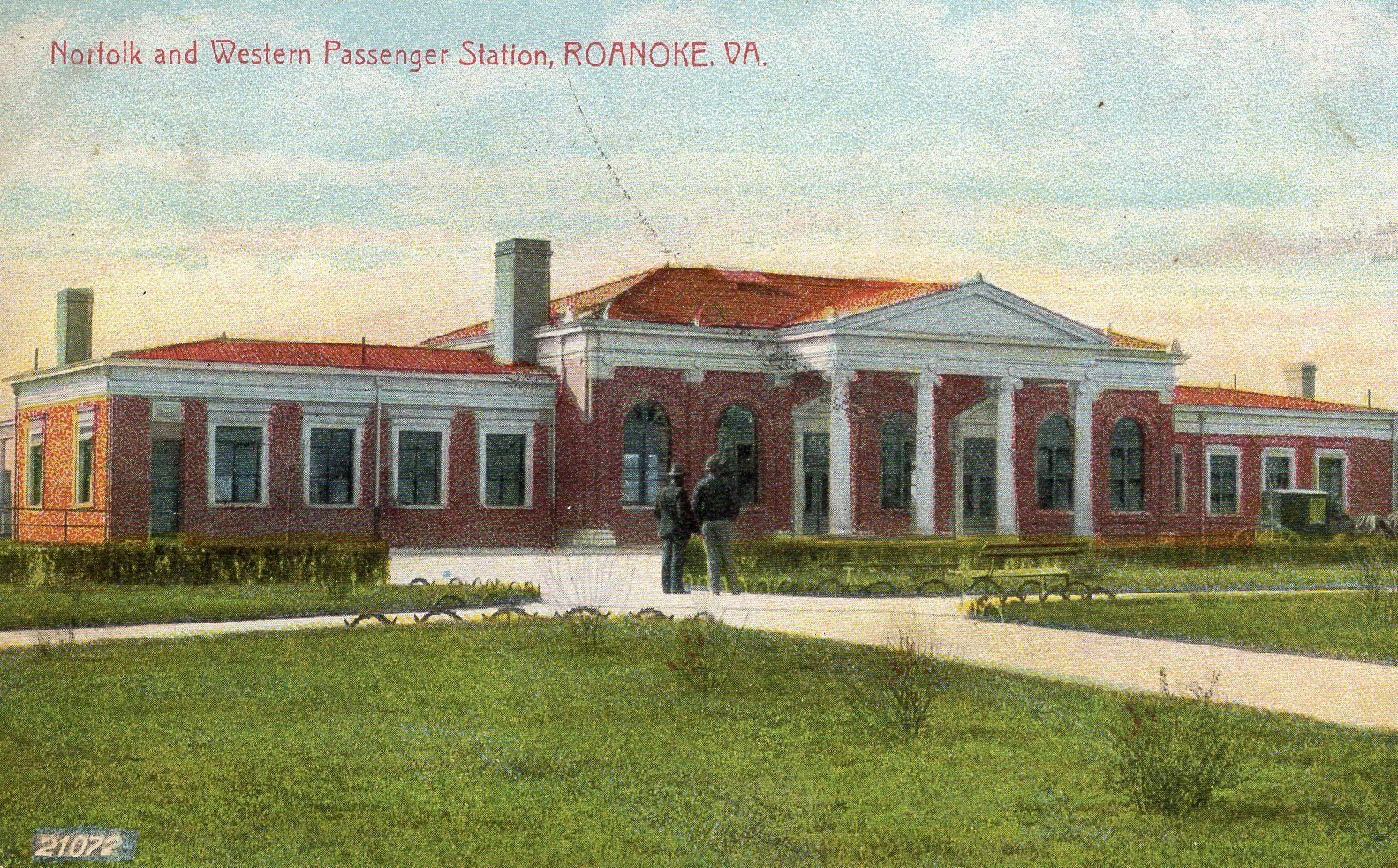
The Passenger Station as it appeared in 1909

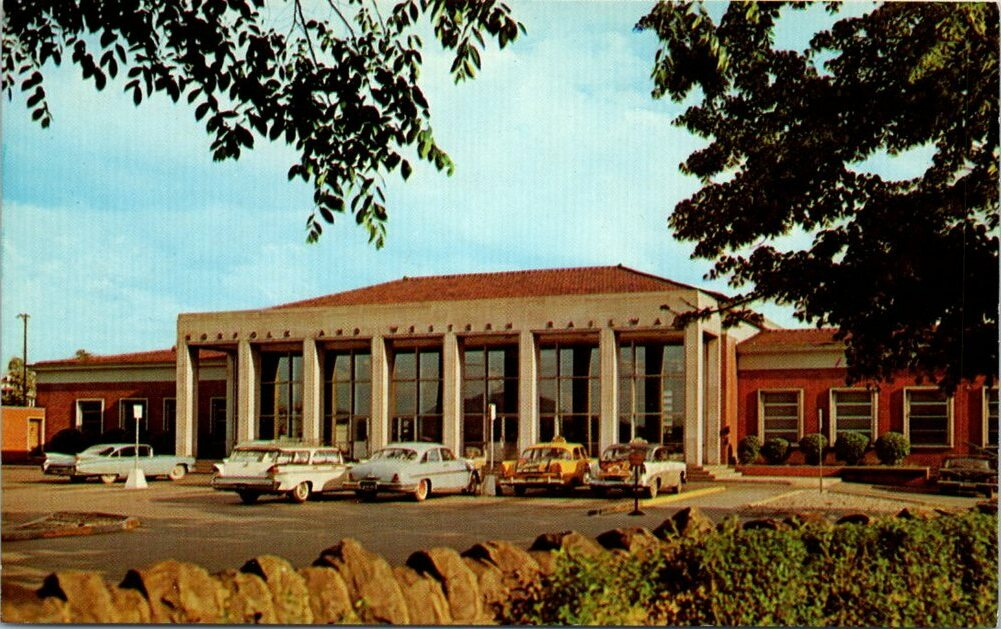
The Passenger Station in the 1950s, after the Raymond Loewy renovation
