= Virginia Transformer Corporation =

Power transformer manufacturer

Virginia Transformer Corp
- Company type: Private
- Industry: Energy Utilities & Services
- Founded: 1971
- Headquarters: 220 Glade View Drive, Roanoke, Virginia 24012, US
- Key people: Prabhat K. Jain, President and CEO
- Website: vatransformer.com

Virginia Transformer Corp (VTC) is the largest power transformer manufacturer in the U.S. It was established in 1971 to provide power transformers to the Appalachian mining industry. Since then it has expanded to provide transformers across North America. The company supplies custom-made transformers to power generating and distributing companies, heavy industries and other businesses. It also designs generator and substation applications.

The company has six manufacturing facilities in North America. The product range covers a wide range, from larger distribution transformers to large power transformers, rectifier and drive-duty transformers, and special transformers for a wide array of applications. VTC has designed transformers to perform at 14,000 feet (4,300 m) in the mines of Chile's mountains and for the New York City Subway system.

== Key people ==
- Prabhat Jain – President/CEO since 1982
- Matthew Gregg – Vice President Operations (Roanoke & Pocatello Plants)
- Subhas Sarkar – Technical Manager Development (Retired & part–time consultant)
- Tim Haggett – Chief Financial Officer
- Mudassar Mohsin – Corporate Head of Human Resources
- Rakesh Rathi – VP Engineering & Materials
- Rajiv Kumar – Marketing Director

== Locations ==
- Roanoke, Virginia – Corporate office and manufacturing plant
- Troutville, Virginia – Manufacturing, metal fabrication plant
- Pocatello, Idaho – Manufacturing plant
- Rincon, Georgia – Manufacturing plant
- Chihuahua, Mexico – Two manufacturing plants
- Delhi, India – Design, IT and procurement support center

== Products ==
- Liquid Filled
- Automatic Load Tap Changing
- Voltage Regulators
- Dry Type
- Uniclad
- Repair and Refurbishment
