= O. Winston Link Museum =

Coordinates: 37°16′25″N 79°56′17″W

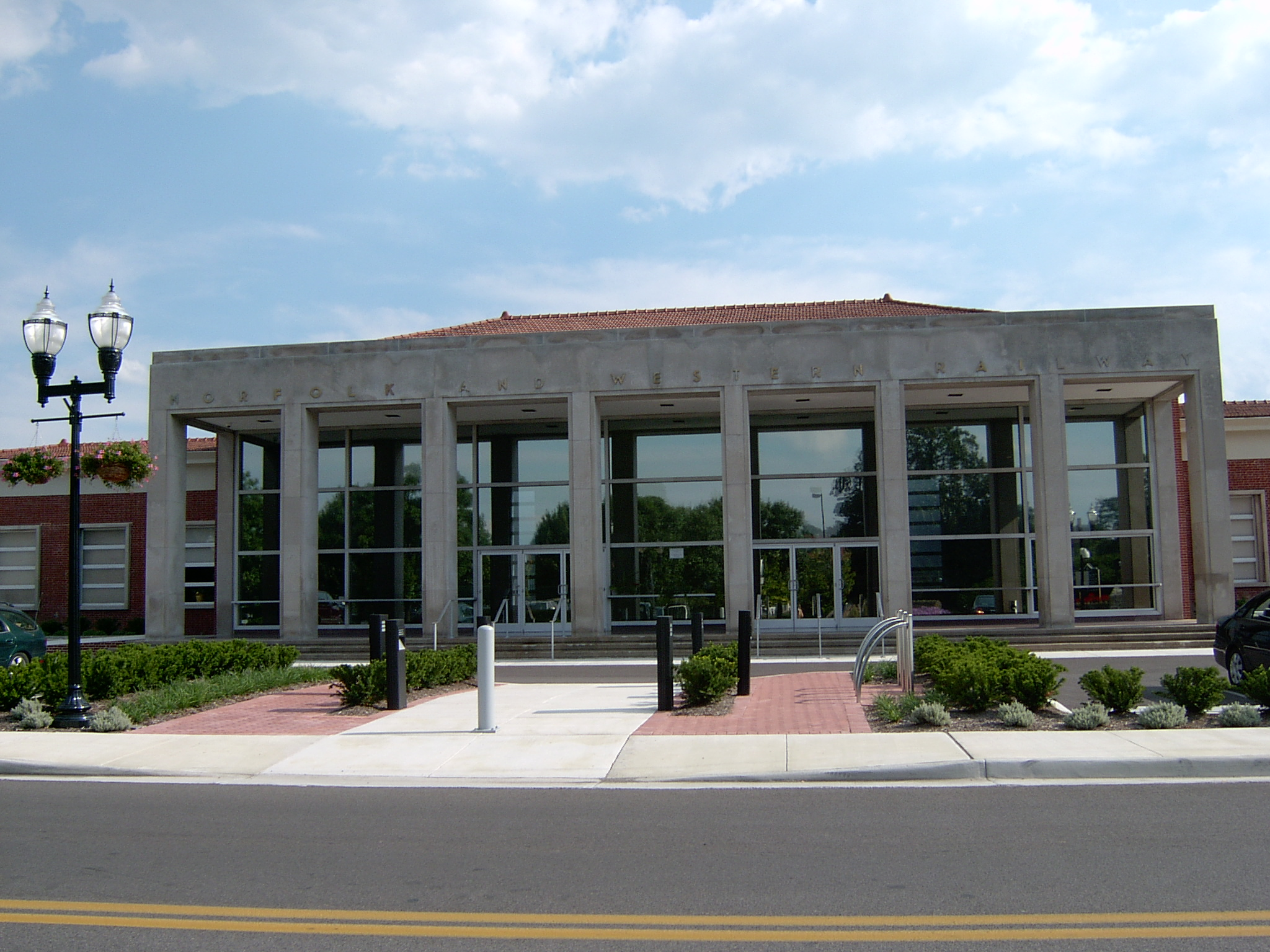
- The museum building entrance
- Established: January 2004
- Location: Roanoke, Virginia
- Type: Photography museum
- Director: Kim Parker

The O. Winston Link Museum is a museum dedicated to the photography of O. Winston Link, the 20th-century railroad photographer widely considered the master of the juxtaposition of steam railroading and rural culture. He is most noted for his 1950s photographs of steam locomotives at night, lit by numerous flashbulbs. He carefully planned the lighting and the staging of these photos, placing human subjects in many.

Opened in January 2004, the museum is housed in a former Norfolk & Western Railway passenger train station in downtown Roanoke, Virginia. Originally built in 1905, the building was renovated in 1949 by industrial designer Raymond Loewy, and is one of three contributing structures to the Norfolk and Western Railway Company Historic District, which was listed on the National Register of Historic Places in 1999.

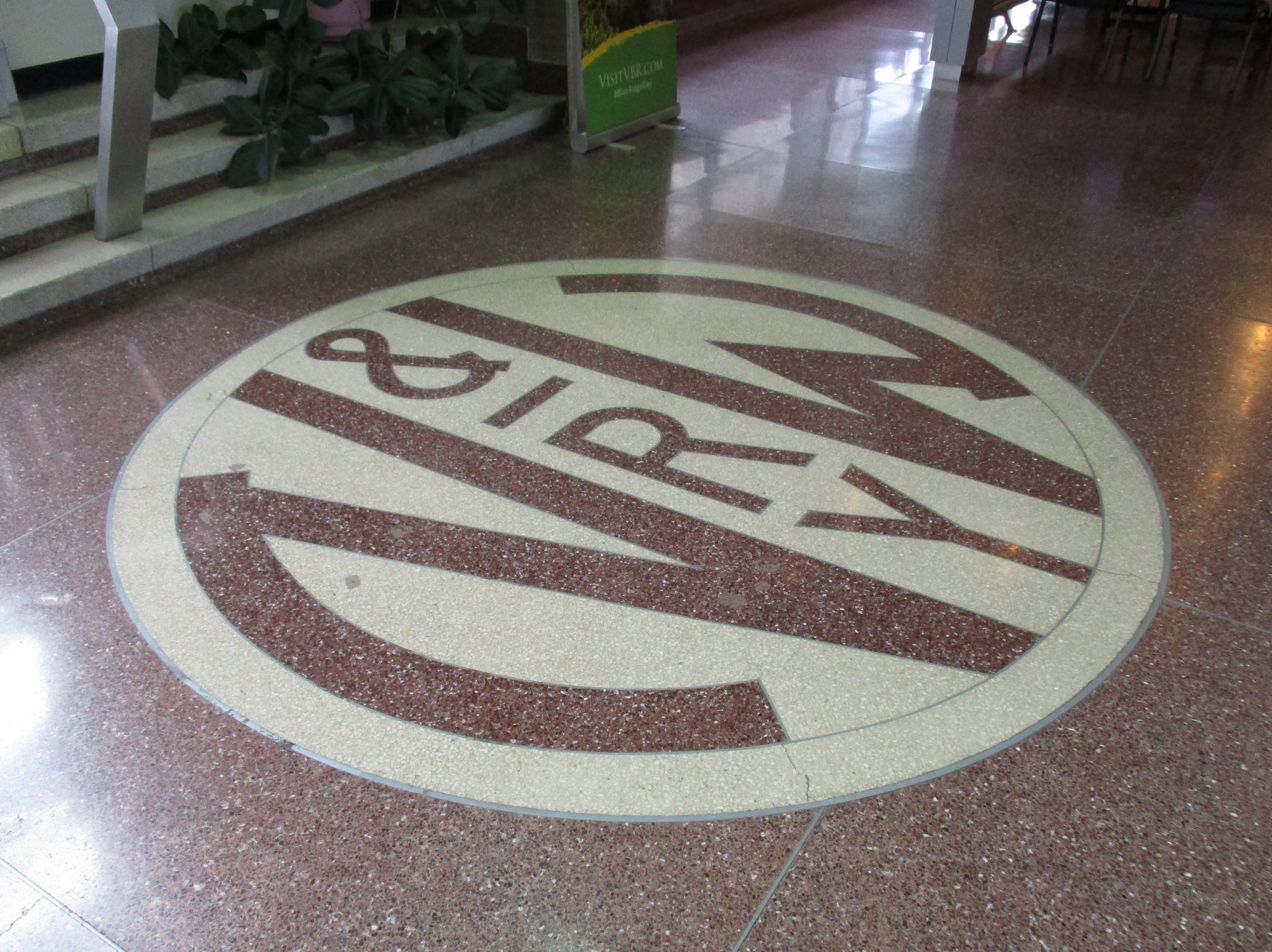
Norfolk and Western Railway terrazzo floor logo, former Norfolk and Western Passenger Station (O. Winston Link Museum)

It displays hundreds of photographic prints and has several interactive displays, including audio that provide information on Link's photographic subjects. Also displayed is some of the equipment that Link used to create his nighttime photographs.

== See also ==
- List of museums devoted to one photographer
- Science Museum of Western Virginia
- Taubman Museum of Art
- Virginia Museum of Transportation
