= Roanoke, Virginia =

Independent city in the United States

- Independent city
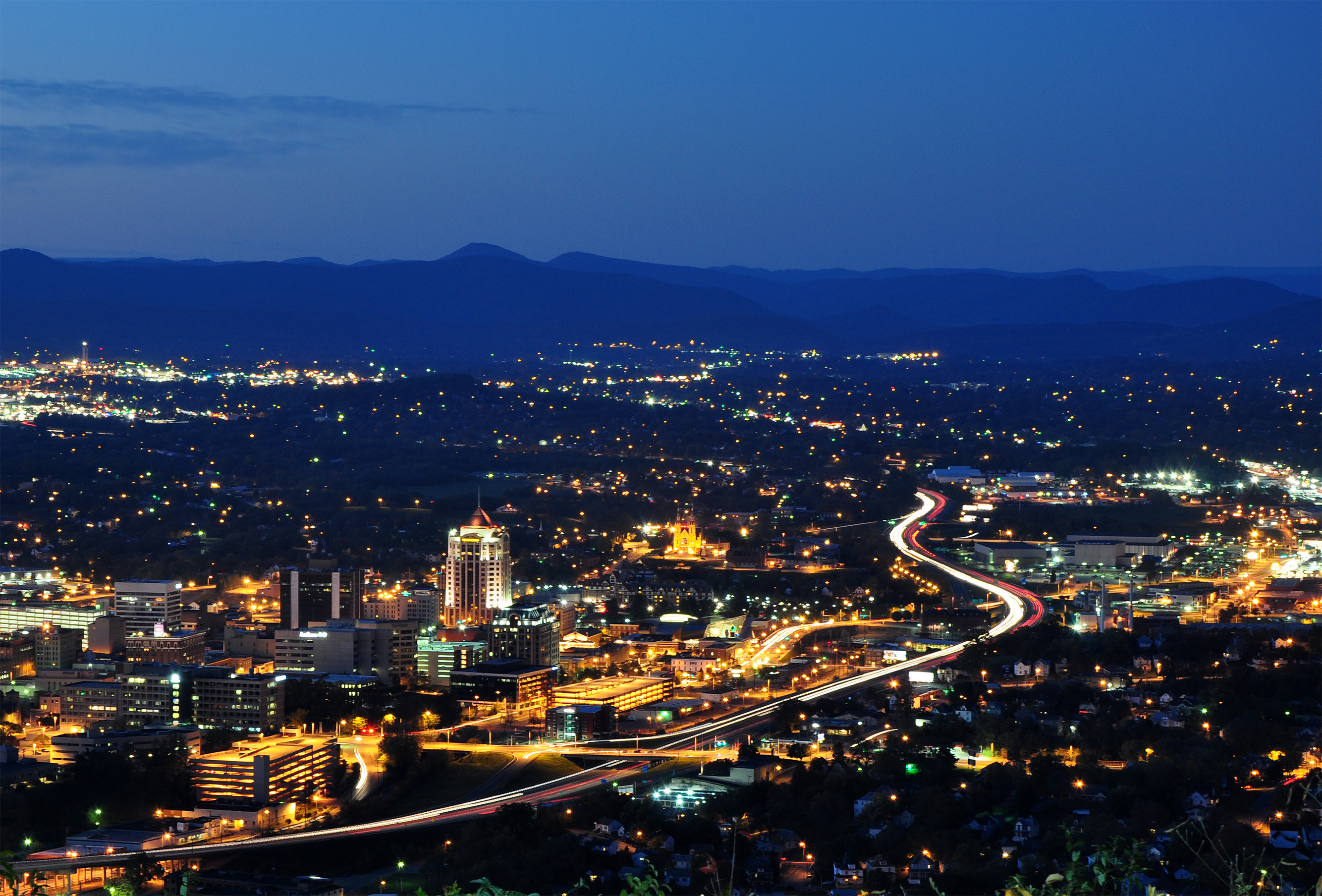
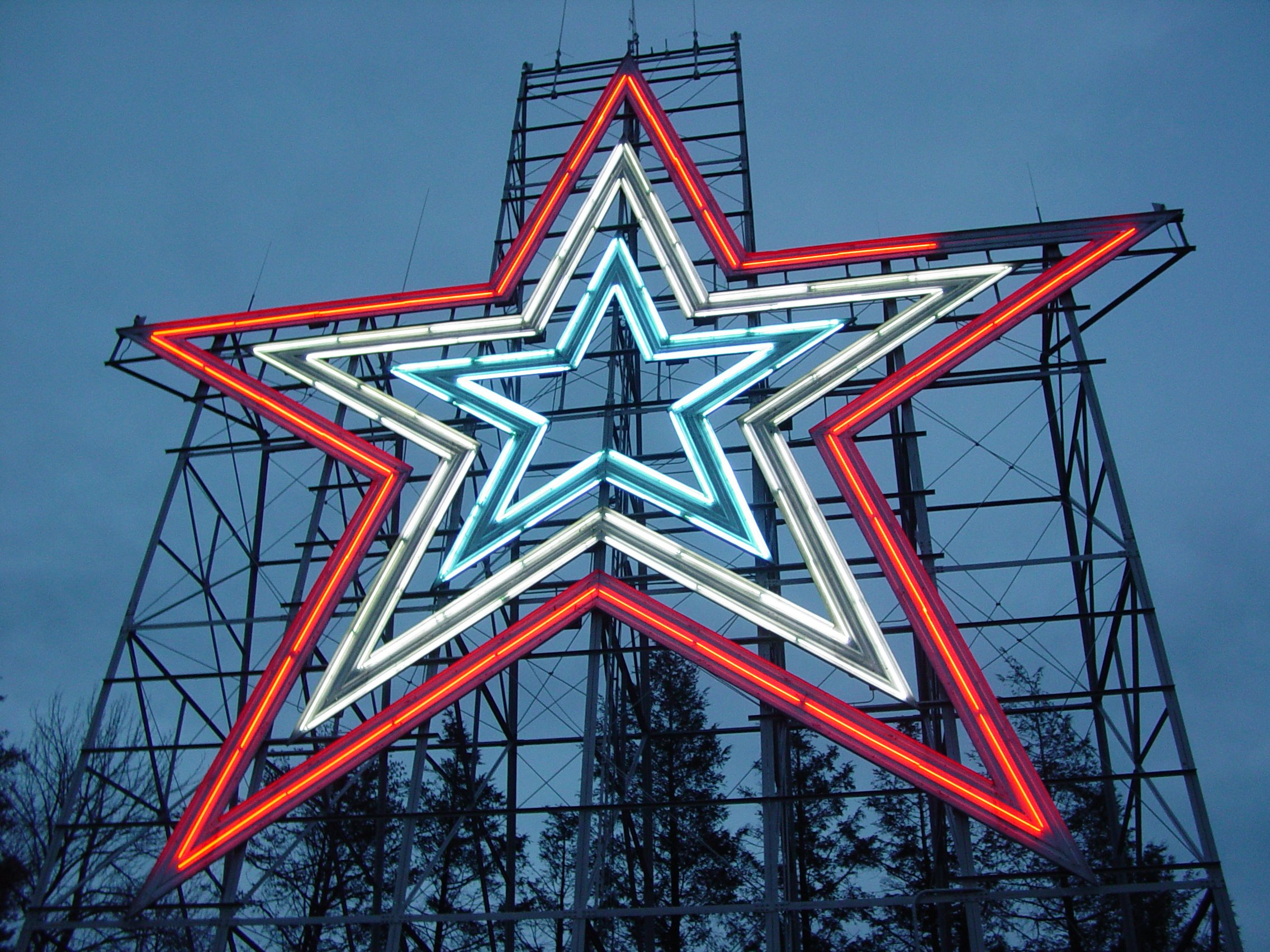
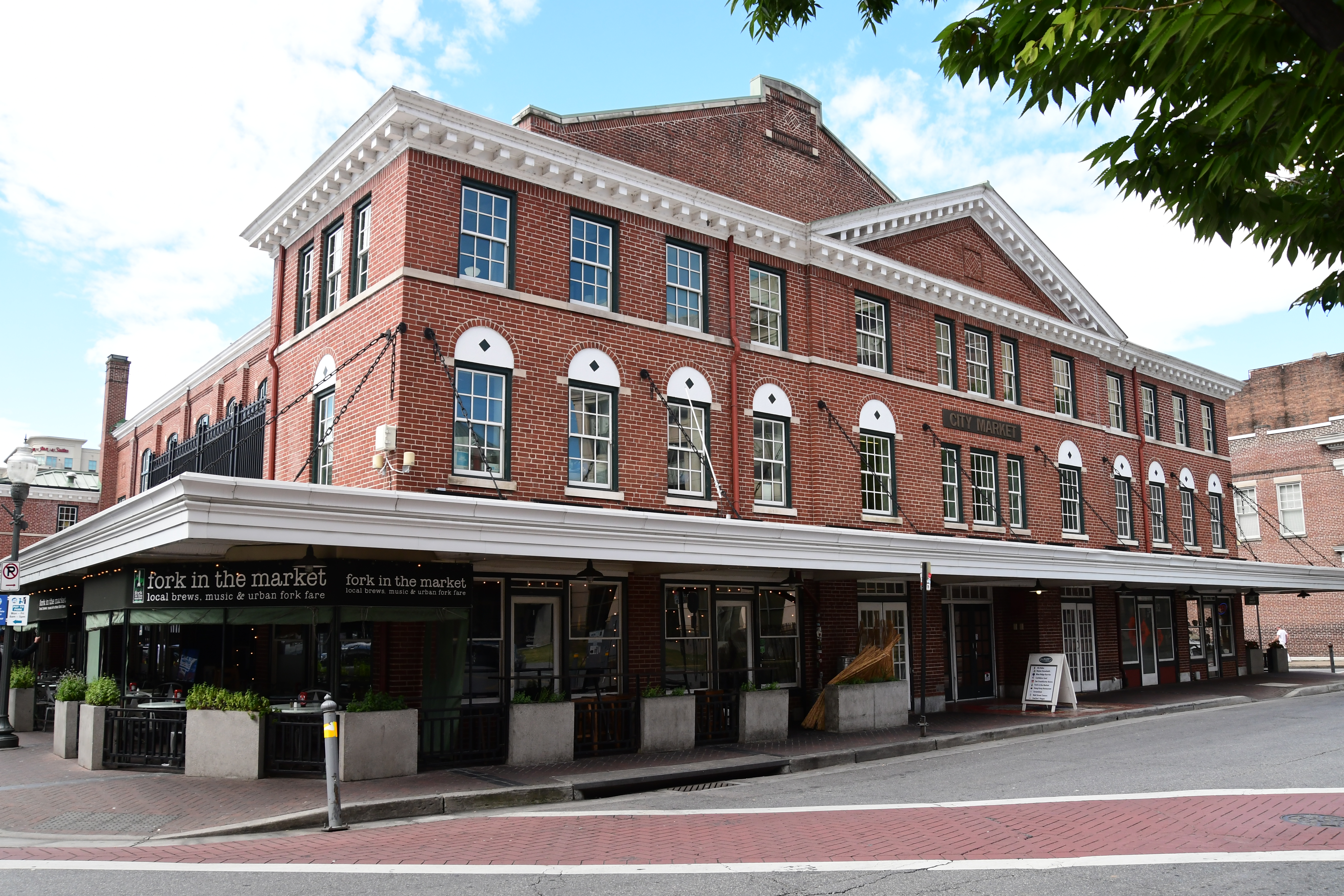
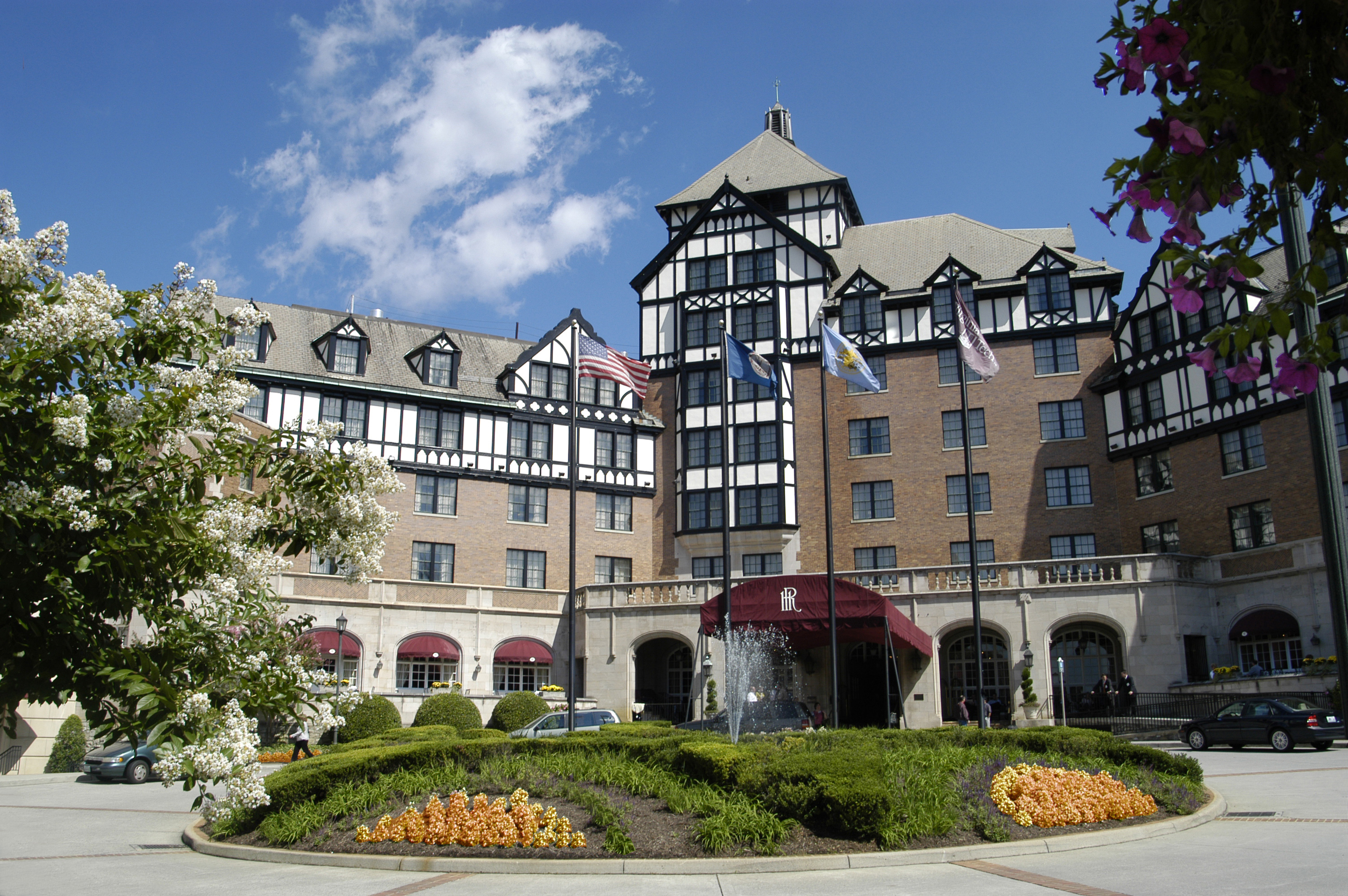
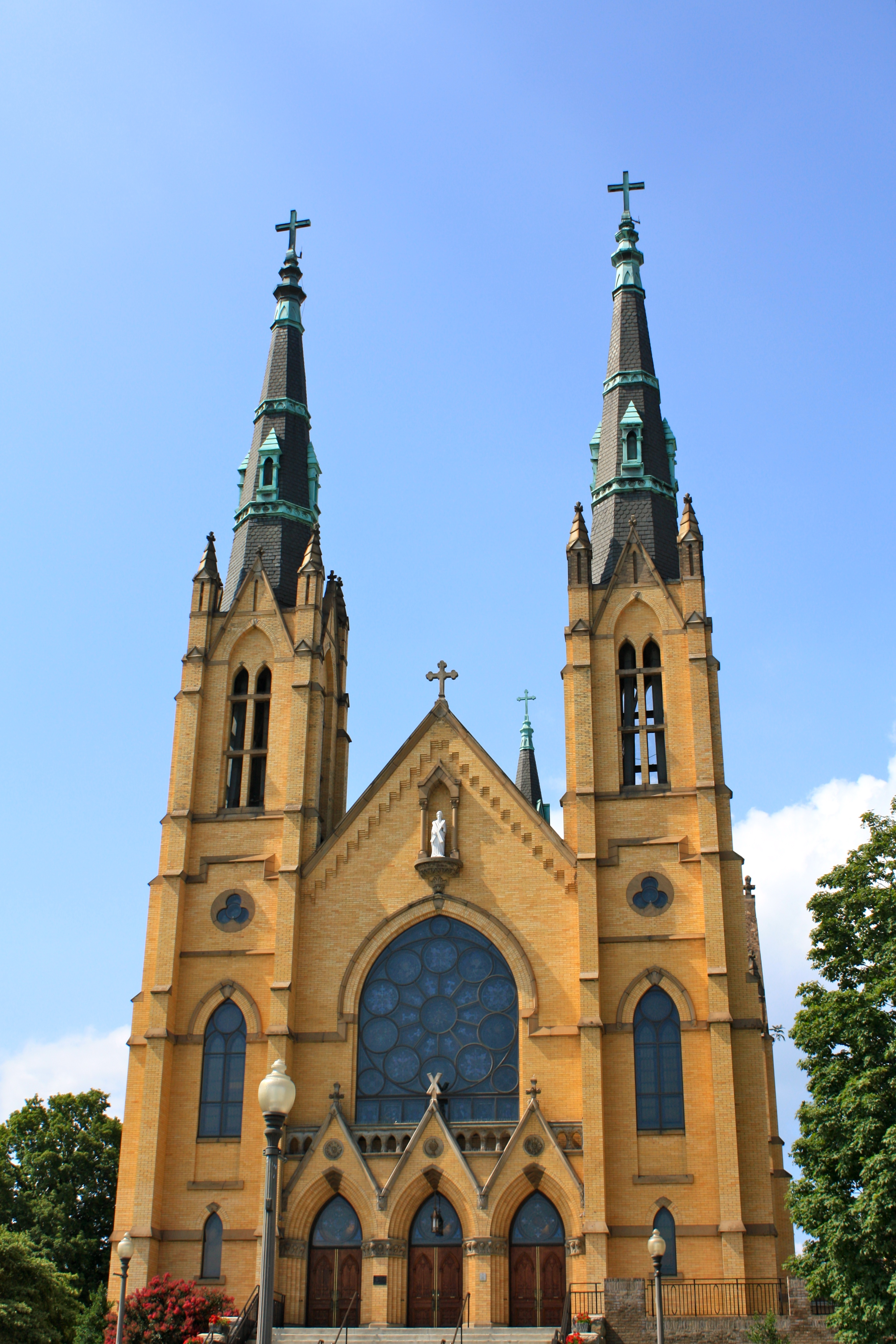
- Clockwise from top: Downtown Roanoke, City market building, Basilica of St. Andrew, Hotel Roanoke, Roanoke Star

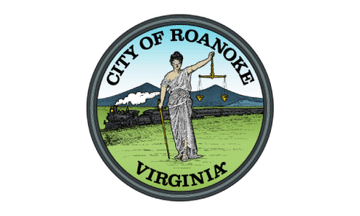
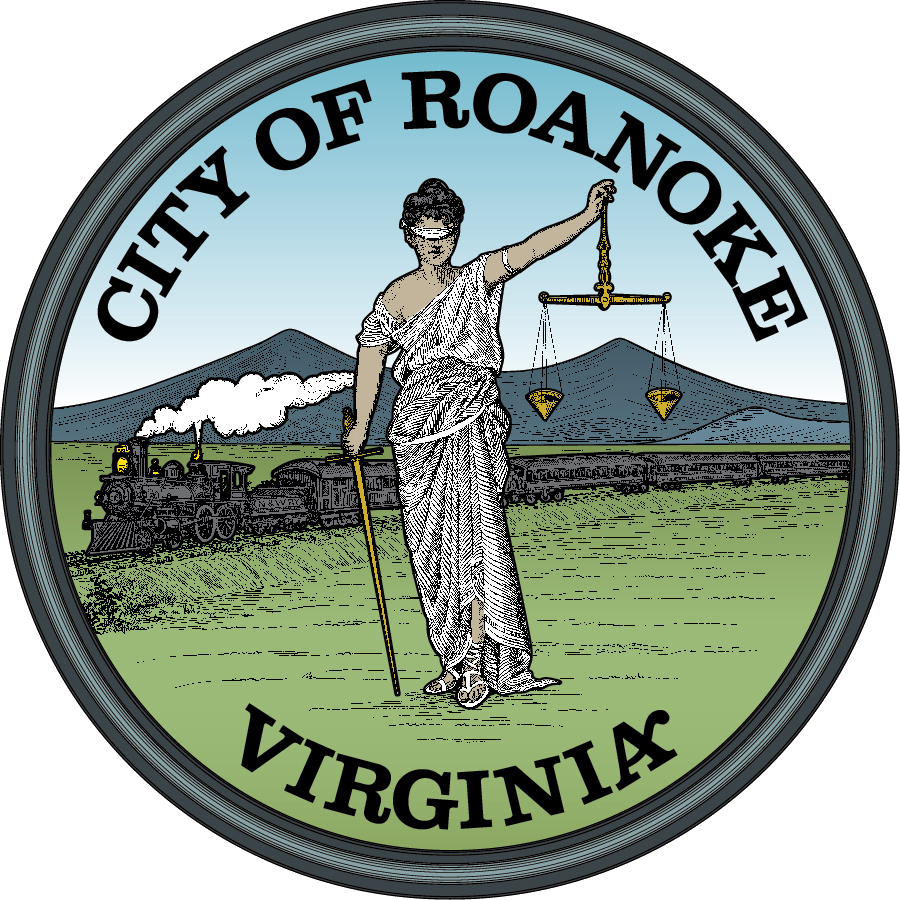
- Flag Seal Logo
- Nicknames: The Star City of The South, Magic City, Star City
- Interactive map of Roanoke, Virginia
- Location within Virginia Location within the United States
- Coordinates: 37°16′14″N 79°56′33″W
- Country: United States
- State: Virginia
- Named for: Roanoke River

Government
  - Type: Council–manager
  - Mayor: Joe Cobb
  - Vice mayor: Terry McGuire

Area
  - Independent city: 42.85 sq mi (110.99 km^{2})
  - Land: 42.52 sq mi (110.13 km^{2})
  - Water: 0.33 sq mi (0.86 km^{2})
- Elevation: 974 ft (297 m)

Population (2020)
  - Independent city: 100,011
  - Estimate (2025): 99,111 ▼
  - Rank: 326th in the United States; 8th in Virginia
  - Density: 2,352.0/sq mi (908.12/km^{2})
  - Urban: 217,312 (US: 177th)
  - Urban density: 1,731.6/sq mi (668.6/km^{2})
  - Metro: 315,251 (US: 163rd)
- Demonym: Roanoker
- Time zone: UTC−5 (Eastern (EST))
  - Summer (DST): UTC−4 (EDT)
- ZIP Codes: 24001–24020, 24022–24038, 24040, 24042–24045, 24048, 24050, 24155, 24157, 24012
- Area codes: 540, 826
- FIPS code: 51-77000
- GNIS feature ID: 1499971
- Website: roanokeva.gov

Roanoke (/ˈroʊ.əˌnoʊk/ ROH-ə-nohk) is an independent city in Virginia, United States. It lies in Southwest Virginia along the Roanoke River, within the Blue Ridge range of the greater Appalachian Mountains. Roanoke is about 50 miles (80 km) north of the Virginia–North Carolina border and 250 miles (400 km) southwest of Washington, D.C., along Interstate 81. At the 2020 census, Roanoke's population was 100,011, making it the most populous city in Virginia west of the state capital, Richmond. It is the primary population center of the Roanoke metropolitan area, which had a population of 315,251 in 2020.

The Roanoke Valley was home to members of the Siouan-speaking Tutelo tribe when European settlers arrived. In the 17th and 18th centuries, Scotch-Irish and later German American farmers gradually drove those Native Americans out of the area as the American frontier pressed westward. In 1882, the Norfolk and Western Railway (N&W) chose the small town of Big Lick as the site of its corporate headquarters and railroad shops. Within two years, the town had become the City of Roanoke. In the 1880s, the population grew by 22 times and the young city experienced the advantages and disadvantages of its boomtown status. During the 20th century, Roanoke's boundaries expanded through annexations of surrounding Roanoke County, and it became Southwest Virginia's economic and cultural hub. The 1982 decision by N&W to move its headquarters out of the city, along with other manufacturing closures, led Roanoke to a primarily service economy. In the 21st century, a robust healthcare industry and the development and increased marketing of the city's outdoor amenities have helped reverse population decline.

Roanoke is known for the Roanoke Star, an 88.5-foot-tall (27.0 m) illuminated star that sits atop a mountain within the city's limits and is the origin of its nickname, "The Star City of the South". Other points of interest include the Hotel Roanoke, a 330-room Tudor Revival structure built by N&W in 1882, the Taubman Museum of Art, designed by architect Randall Stout, and the city's farmer's market, the oldest continuously operating open-air market in the state. The Roanoke Valley features 26 miles (42 km) of greenways with bicycle and pedestrian trails, and the city's location in the Blue Ridge Mountains provides access to numerous outdoor recreation opportunities.

== History ==
=== Early history and incorporation ===
The current site of Roanoke lies near the intersection of the Great Wagon Road and the Carolina Road, two branches of a network of early colonial roads that developed from Native American trails in the Appalachian region. While the name Roanoke is said to have originated from a Native American word for shell beads used as currency, that word was first used 300 miles (480 km) away, where the Roanoke River empties into the Atlantic Ocean near Roanoke Island. When Europeans arrived, the Roanoke Valley itself was home to members of the Tutelo tribe, a Siouan-speaking people who were gradually pushed out of the area by advancing European settlers.

Many of those settlers were Scotch-Irish who arrived in the region during the 18th and early 19th centuries following the Plantation of Ulster. They were followed by significant numbers of Germans from Pennsylvania via the Great Wagon Road. By 1838, the area was populated enough that Roanoke County was created out of parts of Botetourt and Montgomery Counties, and the area's first railroad, the Virginia and Tennessee, arrived in 1852.

The railroad built its new depot just south of a small town named Gainesborough, but named the depot after Big Lick, another small community located just to the east, which itself was named after the salt deposits that had drawn game to the area for years. Gainesborough increasingly became referred to as Big Lick (and later as Old Lick) once development drifted farther south towards the depot. Growth in the area was stalled by the Civil War; Roanoke County voted 850–0 in favor of secession and lost many of its men in the subsequent fighting. The burgeoning tobacco trade helped the region's recovery during Reconstruction. Within a decade of the war's end, there were no fewer than six tobacco factories near the Big Lick Depot.

In 1874, the community surrounding the depot applied for and received a town charter, and the Town of Big Lick was formally established. Eight years later, efforts by town boosters succeeded in securing Big Lick as the junction of the Shenandoah Valley Railroad and the Norfolk and Western Railway (N&W). The two companies also relocated their respective headquarters to the town (the two lines would officially merge in 1890). Big Lick's relatively small size compared to the nearby county seat, Salem, worked in its favor as a draw for the companies. Big Lick's ample farmland and nearby water sources were well suited to the railroads' goal of building much of the town from scratch, including railroad shops, offices, a hotel, and suitable housing for their many employees.

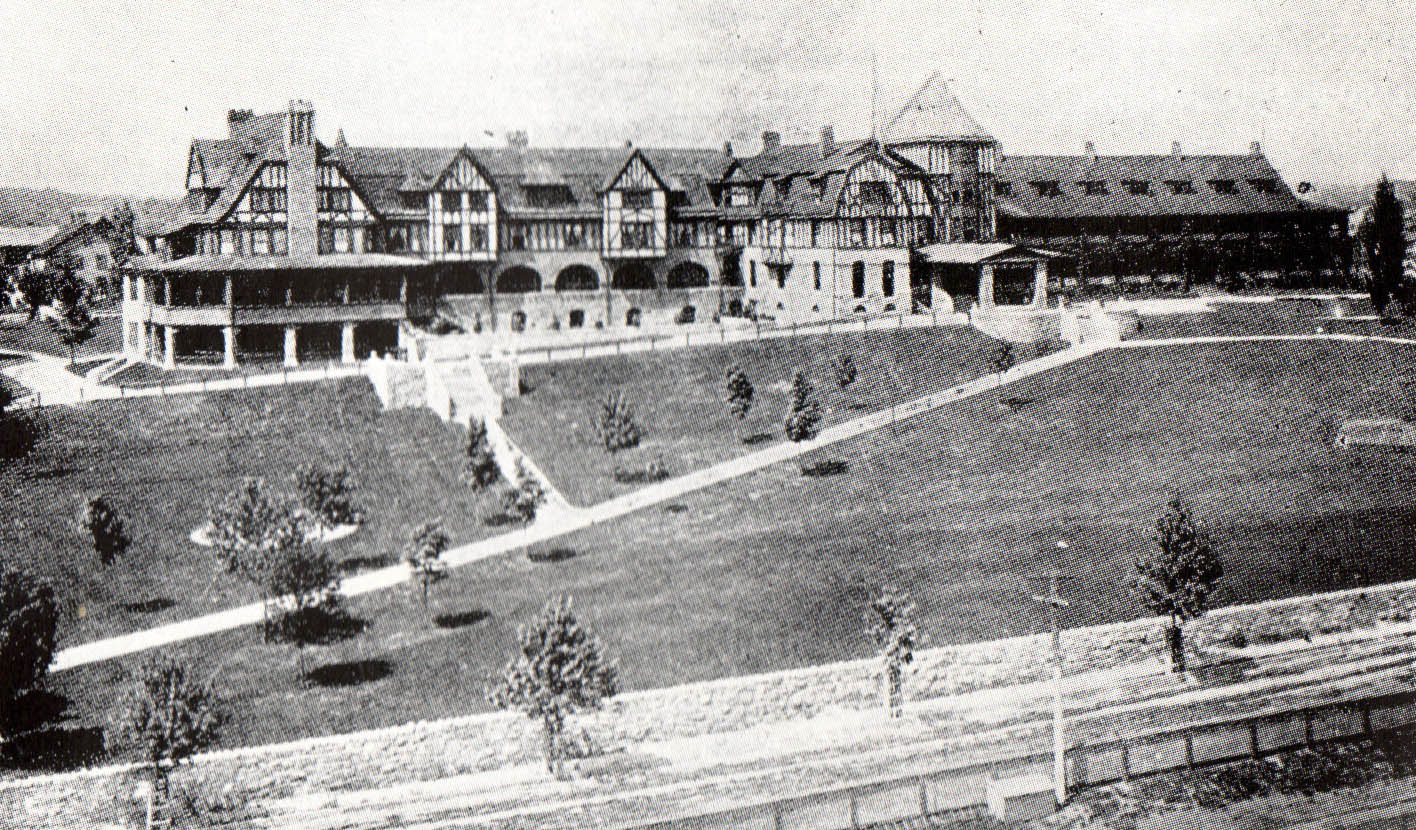
Hotel Roanoke as it appeared in 1910. N&W ordered an expansion to the hotel before the original structure was completed.

In the early 1880s, Big Lick's residents voted to rename the town "Kimball" after Frederick J. Kimball, an executive for the two railroad companies who played a significant role in their new location. Kimball turned down the honor, saying, "On the Roanoke River in Roanoke County – name it Roanoke." The town obliged, officially becoming the Town of Roanoke on February 3, 1882. The new charter also annexed nearly 2.5 square miles (6.5 km^{2}) of additional land, including the Town of Gainesborough (later shortened to Gainsboro), which by that point had already become the center of the area's African American community. Kimball chose a wheat field north of the railroad tracks and east of Gainsboro for the N&W's new hotel, and the 69-room Hotel Roanoke – designed originally in the Queen Anne style before numerous rebuilds and expansions gave it its current Tudor Revival appearance – opened its doors in 1882.

With the rapid influx of railroad employees and others in associated industries, Roanoke's population soared and, by the end of 1883, had passed 5,000. That milestone made the town eligible for a city charter, and on January 31, 1884, the town became the City of Roanoke.

With a population that ballooned from under 700 residents in 1880 to over 16,000 in 1890 – and earning itself the nickname "The Magic City" in the process – Roanoke suffered many of the same difficulties that affected other 19th century boomtowns. Its infrastructure was essentially nonexistent, and a lack of sewers combined with the area's marshy terrain contributed to regular outbreaks of diphtheria and cholera. Bond initiatives designed to alleviate these and other issues highlighted racial tensions in the city, as the African American community – roughly 30 percent of Roanoke's population in 1891 – opposed the measures because the money would only be used to improve white neighborhoods. Black neighborhoods in Roanoke typically received public amenities such as running water and paved roads only after their white counterparts, and Roanoke was among the first to adopt the Jim Crow laws that were becoming increasingly popular in the South. The local press, for its part, stoked the white population's fears and anxiety with near-constant reports of African American "savagery".

In September 1893, tensions boiled over when a white woman was allegedly robbed and beaten by an African-American man, Thomas Smith, near the city's market. Smith was held in the city jail; a mob of hundreds surrounded the building and demanded "lynch justice". A shootout between the mob and an undermanned militia ensued, leaving eight dead and thirty-one more injured. Included among the wounded was the city's mayor, the previously widely admired Henry S. Trout, who had vowed protection of the prisoner. The rioting mob was eventually successful in gaining control of Smith. They proceeded to hang him and mutilate his body, which was eventually burned when the mob was deterred from its initial plan to bury it in Mayor Trout's front yard. The mayor himself was forced to flee the city out of fear for his life and only returned a week later after the national press condemned the riot and praised Trout's courage during the event.

=== 20th century – present ===
Despite these and other setbacks, the city grew through the early 20th century, both in area and population. In addition to the land gained in its 1882 town charter, relatively unopposed annexations occurred five more times by 1926, though Roanoke County would become less agreeable to later attempts. Mill Mountain became a popular entertainment locale for early residents; an observation tower and the Rockledge Inn each opened atop the mountain in 1892. Mountain Park, an early amusement center complete with a casino and roller coaster, opened at the foot of the mountain in 1903, and beginning in 1910 visitors could pay a quarter to ride an incline railway to the top of Mill Mountain and back.

Another mainstay at the base of the mountain was Roanoke Memorial Hospital. Completed in 1900 as Roanoke Hospital, the building has undergone many expansions and today is the flagship of the Carilion Clinic healthcare group. The hospital joined some manufacturing operations that were established along the banks of the Roanoke River in the early 20th century, including the American Viscose Corporation. That company built a plant in 1917 that by a decade later employed 5,000 and was reportedly the largest rayon producing mill in the world.

The city leased land for an airfield beginning in 1929. Still, its development into the region's primary airport did not begin until its designation as a defense project provided federal funding in 1940. That same year, N&W donated the fairground, Maher Field, to the city to build a stadium and armory. Victory Stadium – optimistically named upon its completion in 1942 – played host to the annual Thanksgiving Day football game between Virginia Tech and Virginia Military Institute for years afterward.

By the mid-20th century, Roanoke was increasingly losing population and businesses to a Roanoke County that had become less rural and more suburban in nature and consequently more resistant to annexation attempts by the city. The city was nevertheless successful in annexing additional land in 1943, 1949, three small acquisitions in 1965, 1967, and 1968, and once more in 1976. The county won immunity from further annexations in 1980, but by then, the city had grown from its original size of 0.5 square miles (1.3 km^{2}) to 42.9 square miles (111.1 km^{2}).

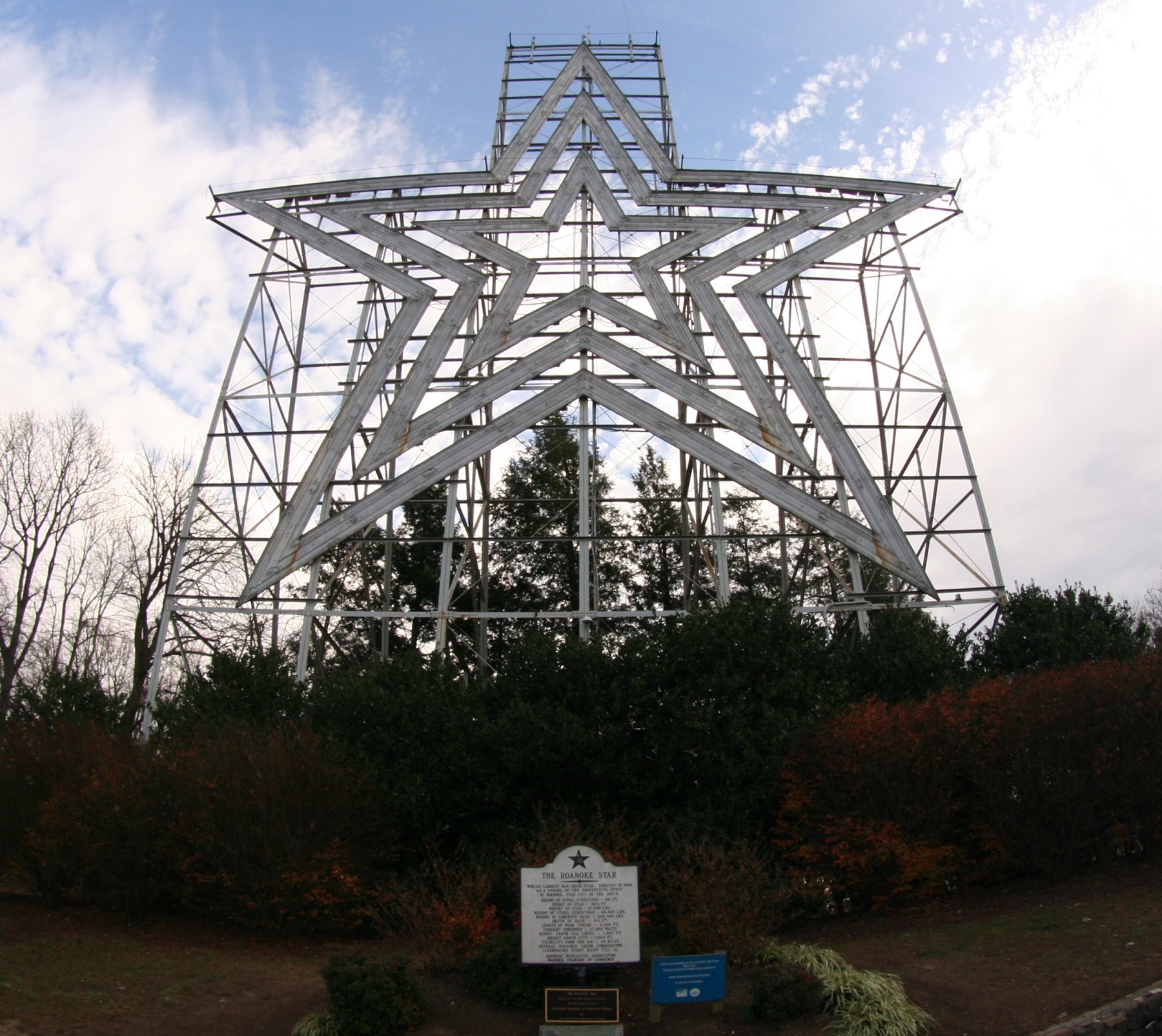
The Roanoke Star is the origin of the city's nickname Star City of the South.

In 1949, the local merchants association erected an 88.5-foot-tall (27.0 m) illuminated star at the top of Mill Mountain in celebration of the upcoming Christmas shopping season. The star was an immediate hit among the city's population, leading to its illumination year-round and earning the city its nickname of "Star City of the South". Despite the popularity boost for the merchants association, shopping habits in Roanoke were becoming more fractured as suburban shopping centers drew patrons away from an increasingly vacant downtown. Crossroads Mall, the first enclosed shopping center in Virginia, and Towers Mall, at the time one of the largest shopping centers in the state, were each completed in 1961. In later years, Tanglewood Mall (1973) and Valley View Mall (1985) contributed to Roanoke's status as the region's retail hub.

Mid-century change to the city came in the form of a massive "urban renewal" effort that saw the construction of both the Roanoke Civic Center (now Berglund Center) as well as an interstate spur into downtown Roanoke. Much of the land for these projects was in Northeast Roanoke, a community of primarily African American citizens who had been largely redlined from the rest of the city. City officials gained the land through eminent domain and proceeded to clear over 1,000 buildings, often through widescale burning. Later projects in the largely black Gainsboro neighborhood removed hundreds of homes and businesses there as well, and late-20th and early-21st century revitalization efforts by the city's government have been met with distrust and varied success.

The second half of the 20th century ushered in a change of identity for Roanoke. In 1982, the N&W completed a merger with the Southern Railway to form the Norfolk Southern Railway, which then relocated their headquarters from Roanoke to Norfolk, Virginia. The company closed their regional headquarters in Roanoke in 2015, and in 2020 shuttered the locomotive shops. The railroad's departure and a string of manufacturing plant closures left a hole in the city's economic base.

In 1987, however, the merger of two of the area's largest hospitals created the forerunner of Carilion Clinic, a medical group that is the largest employer in the state west of Richmond. The group's partnerships with Virginia Tech and Radford University have created two colleges and a research facility in what was formerly an industrial brownfield area, but has since been termed the city's "innovation corridor". These developments, along with the city's decision to improve its parks and recreation amenities and market itself as an outdoor tourism hotspot, have helped reverse its decades-long loss of young adults, and in 2020 Roanoke's population passed 100,000 for the first time since 1980.

== Geography ==
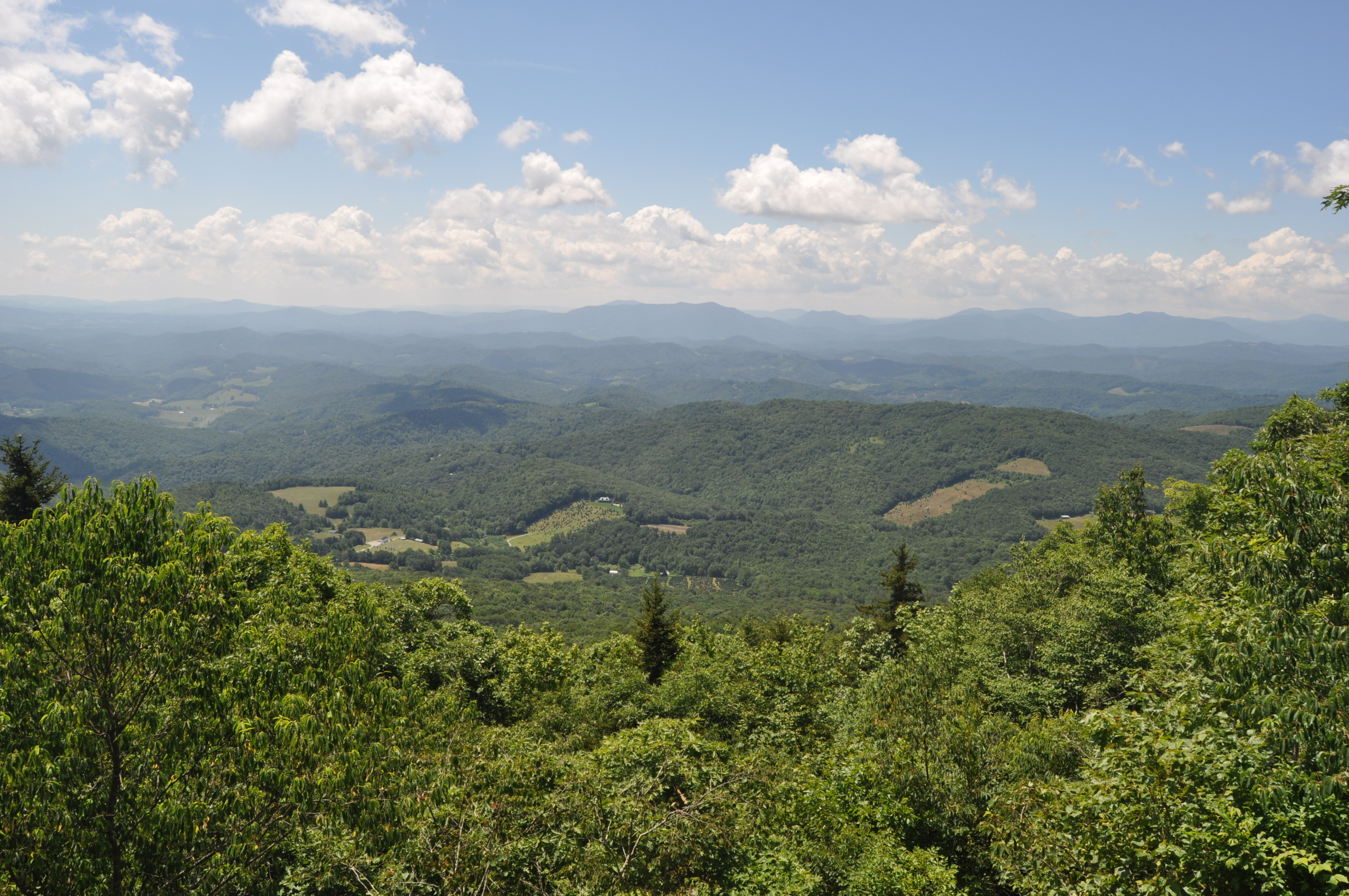
The Blue Ridge Mountains get their distinctive color from isoprene produced by the trees.

Roanoke is the largest city in Virginia west of Richmond and is located in the Blue Ridge Mountains, a range which is part of the greater Appalachian Mountains. According to the United States Census Bureau, the city has a total area of 42.9 square miles (111.1 km^{2}), of which 42.5 square miles (110.1 km^{2}) is land and 0.3 square miles (0.8 km^{2}) (0.8%) is water. It is located in the center of the greater Roanoke Valley and is bisected by the Roanoke River, which flows west-to-east through the city. Within the city limits is Mill Mountain, a 1,700-foot-tall (520 m) mountain and 500-acre municipal park which stands detached from the surrounding ranges.

Roanoke's location in the Blue Ridge Mountains makes it proximate to hundreds of species of plants and wildlife. The area is home to at least 43 species of salamander, and the Poor Mountain Natural Area Preserve in neighboring Roanoke County protects the world's largest collection of piratebush, an exceedingly rare parasitic plant endemic to the Appalachians.

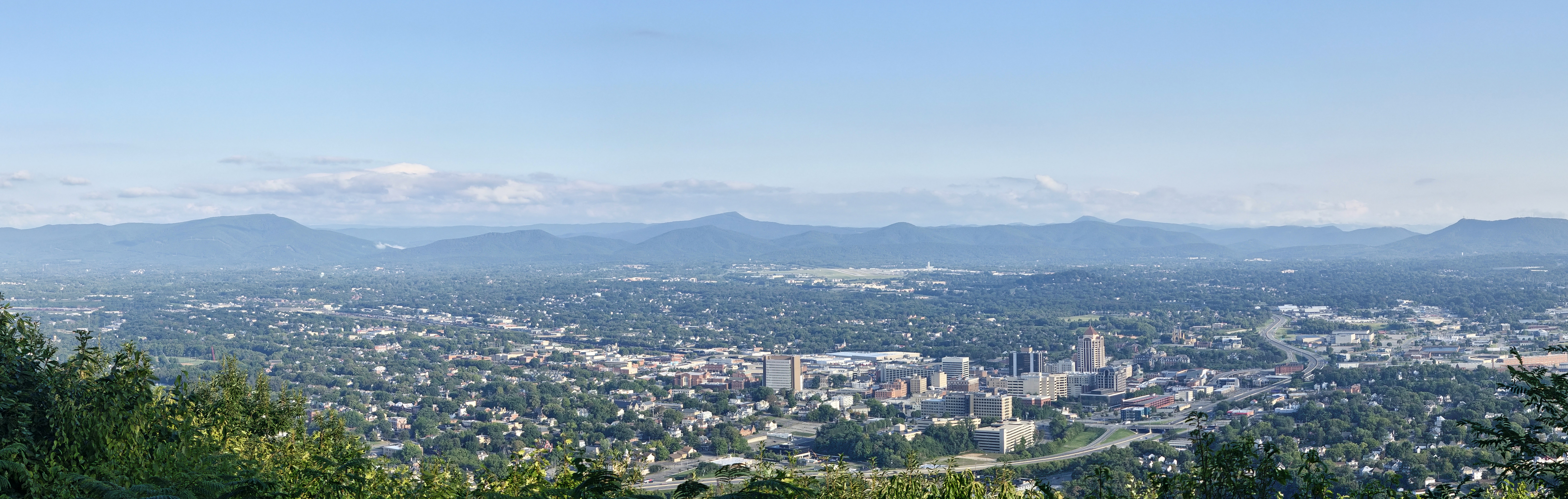
A panorama of Roanoke from the Mill Mountain Star overlook with the Blue Ridge Mountains in the background.

Roanoke is the largest city along both the Appalachian Trail, which runs through Roanoke County just north of the city, and the Blue Ridge Parkway, which runs just south of the city. Carvins Cove, the third-largest municipal park in America at 12,700 acres (51 km^{2}), lies in northeast Roanoke County and southwest Botetourt County. Smith Mountain Lake is several miles southeast of the city, and the George Washington and Jefferson National Forests are nearby. Outdoor pursuits in the region include hiking, mountain biking, cross-country running, canoeing, kayaking, fly fishing, and disc golf.

=== Neighborhoods ===
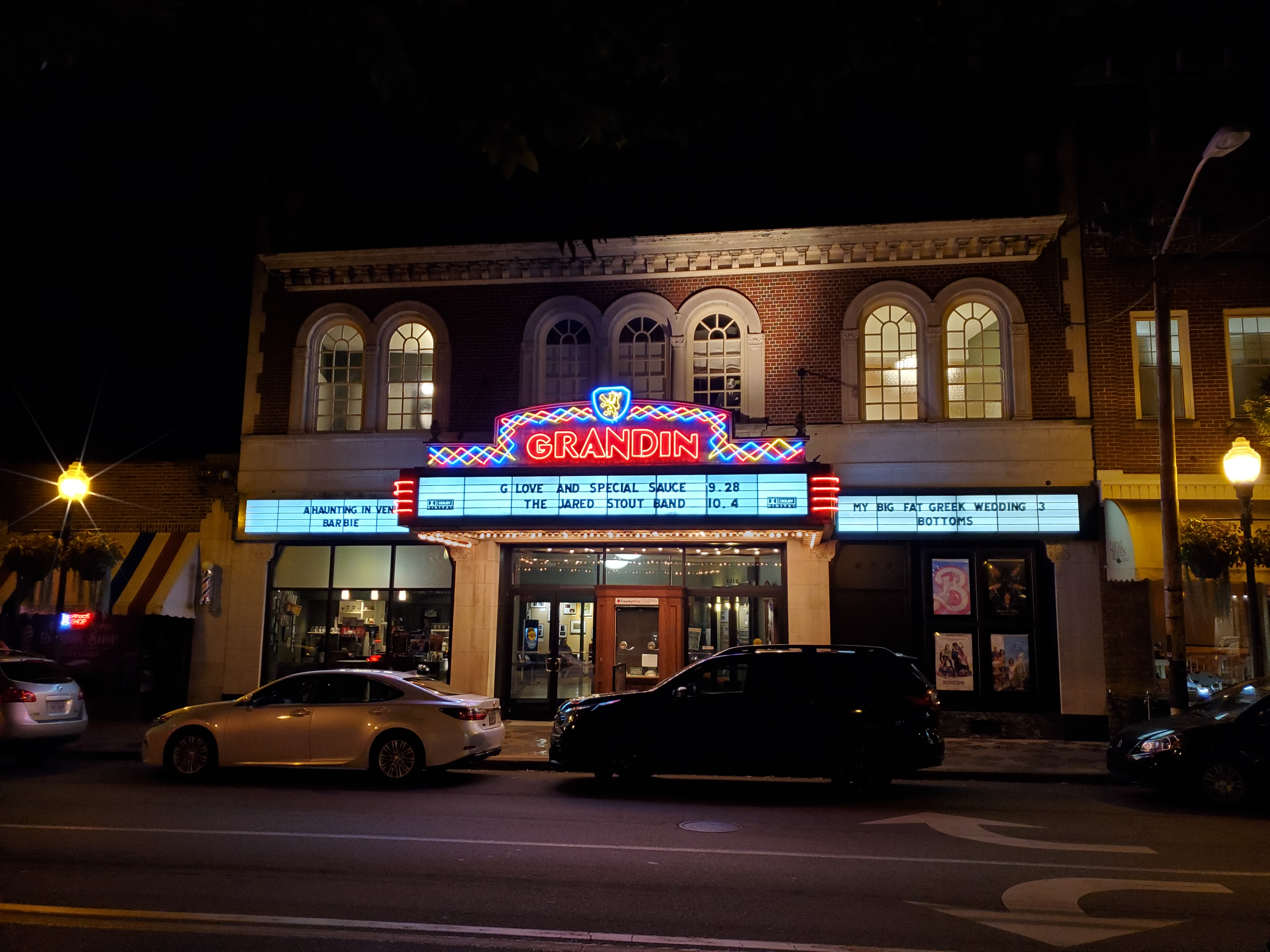
The Grandin Theatre located in Grandin Village

Roanoke is divided into 49 separate neighborhoods. The city has incorporated into its comprehensive plan the goal of developing these neighborhoods into "villages", each with their own village center, and with the downtown neighborhood acting as the village center for the city as a whole. The Raleigh Court neighborhood has been cited as a model for such development, consisting of a variety of residential settings located around Grandin Village, an active commercial hub anchored by the Grandin Theatre, the city's only surviving historic theater. That commercial district is one of the city's nine neighborhoods (or portions thereof) that have been listed on the National Register of Historic Places.

=== Climate ===
Though located along the Blue Ridge Mountains at elevations exceeding 900 ft (270 m), Roanoke lies in the humid subtropical climate zone (Köppen Cfa), with four distinct, but generally mild, seasons. It is located in USDA hardiness zone 7b, with the suburbs falling in zone 7a. Extremes in temperature have ranged from 105 °F (41 °C) (as recently as August 21, 1983) down to −12 °F (−24 °C) on December 30, 1917. However, neither 100 °F (38 °C) nor 0 °F (−18 °C) are reached in most years, though the city experienced a three-day stretch from July 1–3, 2026, when the high temperature was 100 °F (38 °C) each day; the most recent instance of reaching 0 °F (−18 °C) was February 20, 2015. More typically, the area records an average of 6.1 days where the temperature stays at or below freezing and 30.5 days with 90 °F (32 °C)+ highs annually. The monthly mean temperature ranges from 37.9 °F (3.3 °C) in January to 77.8 °F (25.4 °C) in July.

Based on the 1991−2020 period, the city averages 14.8 inches (38 cm) of snow per winter. Roanoke experienced a mild snow drought in the 2000s, which ended in December 2009 when 17 inches (43 cm) of snow fell on Roanoke in a single storm. Winter snowfall has ranged from trace amounts in 1918–19 and 1919–20 to 62.7 inches (159 cm) in 1959–60; unofficially, the largest single storm dumped approximately three feet (0.9 m) from December 16−18, 1890.

Historically, flooding has been the primary weather-related hazard faced by Roanoke. Heavy rains, most frequently from the remnants of a hurricane, drain from surrounding areas to the narrow Roanoke Valley. The most recent significant flood was in the fall of 2018, when the remains of Hurricane Michael dumped over five inches of rain on the area in the span of only a few hours. The most severe flooding in the city's history occurred on November 4, 1985, when heavy storms from Hurricane Juan stalled over the area. Ten people drowned in the Roanoke Valley and others were saved by rescue personnel. That incident prompted a major flood reduction effort completed in 2012 by the U.S. Army Corps of Engineers, which has limited the damage caused by subsequent storms.

Climate data for Roanoke–Blacksburg Regional Airport, Virginia (1991–2020 normals, extremes 1912–present)
Month	Jan	Feb	Mar	Apr	May	Jun	Jul	Aug	Sep	Oct	Nov	Dec	Year
Record high °F (°C)	81 (27)	84 (29)	90 (32)	95 (35)	99 (37)	104 (40)	105 (41)	105 (41)	103 (39)	99 (37)	83 (28)	80 (27)	105 (41)
Mean maximum °F (°C)	67.2 (19.6)	70.3 (21.3)	78.5 (25.8)	85.7 (29.8)	89.5 (31.9)	93.6 (34.2)	95.8 (35.4)	94.5 (34.7)	91.2 (32.9)	84.6 (29.2)	76.0 (24.4)	68.3 (20.2)	96.9 (36.1)
Mean daily maximum °F (°C)	47.1 (8.4)	50.8 (10.4)	59.0 (15.0)	69.7 (20.9)	77.2 (25.1)	84.4 (29.1)	88.1 (31.2)	86.5 (30.3)	80.0 (26.7)	70.1 (21.2)	59.0 (15.0)	50.0 (10.0)	68.5 (20.3)
Daily mean °F (°C)	37.9 (3.3)	40.8 (4.9)	48.3 (9.1)	58.0 (14.4)	66.1 (18.9)	73.8 (23.2)	77.8 (25.4)	76.2 (24.6)	69.6 (20.9)	58.9 (14.9)	48.4 (9.1)	40.9 (4.9)	58.1 (14.5)
Mean daily minimum °F (°C)	28.7 (−1.8)	30.8 (−0.7)	37.6 (3.1)	46.3 (7.9)	55.0 (12.8)	63.2 (17.3)	67.4 (19.7)	66.0 (18.9)	59.1 (15.1)	47.8 (8.8)	37.7 (3.2)	31.8 (−0.1)	47.6 (8.7)
Mean minimum °F (°C)	11.0 (−11.7)	15.8 (−9.0)	21.3 (−5.9)	31.5 (−0.3)	40.3 (4.6)	51.7 (10.9)	57.6 (14.2)	55.6 (13.1)	45.1 (7.3)	32.0 (0.0)	23.4 (−4.8)	16.9 (−8.4)	9.0 (−12.8)
Record low °F (°C)	−11 (−24)	−1 (−18)	9 (−13)	15 (−9)	30 (−1)	36 (2)	47 (8)	42 (6)	32 (0)	22 (−6)	8 (−13)	−12 (−24)	−12 (−24)
Average precipitation inches (mm)	3.17 (81)	2.89 (73)	3.51 (89)	3.49 (89)	4.31 (109)	4.66 (118)	4.28 (109)	3.37 (86)	4.06 (103)	2.96 (75)	3.04 (77)	3.08 (78)	42.82 (1,088)
Average snowfall inches (cm)	4.3 (11)	4.8 (12)	2.3 (5.8)	0.1 (0.25)	0.0 (0.0)	0.0 (0.0)	0.0 (0.0)	0.0 (0.0)	0.0 (0.0)	0.0 (0.0)	0.1 (0.25)	3.2 (8.1)	14.8 (38)
Average precipitation days (≥ 0.01 in)	9.5	9.5	11.1	10.7	12.4	12.2	11.7	9.7	9.0	7.7	7.8	9.2	120.5
Average snowy days (≥ 0.1 in)	2.0	2.2	1.4	0.1	0.0	0.0	0.0	0.0	0.0	0.0	0.1	1.3	7.1
Source: NOAA

== Demographics ==
Historical population
Census	Pop.	Note	%±
1880	669		—
1890	16,159		2,315.4%
1900	21,495		33.0%
1910	34,874		62.2%
1920	50,842		45.8%
1930	69,206		36.1%
1940	69,287		0.1%
1950	91,921		32.7%
1960	97,110		5.6%
1970	92,115		−5.1%
1980	100,220		8.8%
1990	96,397		−3.8%
2000	94,911		−1.5%
2010	97,032		2.2%
2020	100,011		3.1%
2025 (est.)	99,111	▼	−0.9%
Sources: 1880–1950; 1960–1980; 1990–2000 2010 2020

=== Racial and ethnic composition ===
Roanoke city, Virginia – Racial and ethnic composition Note: the US Census treats Hispanic/Latino as an ethnic category. This table excludes Latinos from the racial categories and assigns them to a separate category. Hispanics/Latinos may be of any race.
Race / Ethnicity (NH = Non-Hispanic)	Pop 1980	Pop 1990	Pop 2000	Pop 2010	Pop 2020	% 1980	% 1990	% 2000	% 2010	% 2020
White alone (NH)	77,081	71,524	65,256	60,042	55,951	76.91%	74.20%	68.75%	61.88%	55.94%
Black or African American alone (NH)	21,861	23,275	25,220	27,256	27,077	21.81%	24.14%	26.57%	28.09%	27.07%
Native American or Alaska Native alone (NH)	73	159	178	198	211	0.07%	0.16%	0.19%	0.20%	0.21%
Asian alone (NH)	312	704	1,088	1,676	2,462	0.31%	0.73%	1.15%	1.73%	2.46%
Native Hawaiian or Pacific Islander alone (NH)	x	x	21	36	42	x	x	0.02%	0.04%	0.04%
Other race alone (NH)	212	70	185	199	523	0.21%	0.07%	0.19%	0.21%	0.52%
Mixed race or Multiracial (NH)	x	x	1,558	2,280	5,261	x	x	1.64%	2.35%	5.26%
Hispanic or Latino (any race)	681	665	1,405	5,345	8,484	0.68%	0.69%	1.48%	5.51%	8.48%
Total	100,220	96,397	94,911	97,032	100,011	100.00%	100.00%	100.00%	100.00%	100.00%

=== 2020 census ===
As of the 2020 census, Roanoke had a population of 100,011, with 44,411 households, 21,199 of which housed families, and a population density of 2,352.0 inhabitants per square mile (908.1/km^{2}). The median age was 39.1 years, 21.1% of residents were under the age of 18, and 17.9% were 65 years of age or older. For every 100 females there were 91.0 males, and for every 100 females age 18 and over there were 88.2 males.

Among the city's households, 25.2% had children under the age of 18 living with them, 30.4% were married couples living together, 23.5% were households with a male householder and no spouse or partner present, and 37.4% were households with a female householder and no spouse or partner present. In total, 42.3% were non-families, 38.5% of all households were made up of individuals, and 13.6% had someone living alone who was 65 years of age or older.

There were 48,726 housing units, of which 8.9% were vacant. The homeowner vacancy rate was 2.0% and the rental vacancy rate was 7.9%.

100.0% of residents lived in urban areas, while 0.0% lived in rural areas.

Racial composition as of the 2020 census
Race	Number	Percent
White	57,309	57.3%
Black or African American	27,470	27.5%
American Indian and Alaska Native	419	0.4%
Asian	2,479	2.5%
Native Hawaiian and Other Pacific Islander	54	0.1%
Some other race	4,795	4.8%
Two or more races	7,485	7.5%
Hispanic or Latino (of any race)	8,484	8.5%

=== American Community Survey ===
According to the unofficial American Community Survey, the median household income in Roanoke was $45,664, and the median family income was $55,345. The per capita income was $29,585. About 20.1% of the population were below the poverty line, including 29.2% of those under age 18 and 12.3% of those age 65 or over.

== Economy ==
Roanoke's economy was long closely linked to its status as the headquarters for the Norfolk and Western Railway. As time progressed, manufacturing and mining businesses contributed to the region's growth. After the N&W's merger with the Southern Railway created the Norfolk Southern Railway in 1982, Norfolk Southern continued to operate maintenance facilities and a rail yard in Roanoke but moved its headquarters to Norfolk, Virginia, and in 2015 moved out of its downtown Roanoke office building. On May 18, 2020, after 139 years of production, Norfolk Southern shut down its locomotive shops and moved all operations to the Juniata Locomotive Shops in Altoona, Pennsylvania. With Norfolk Southern's departure, Roanoke's economy has since the mid-1990s shifted to become dominated by the healthcare industry.

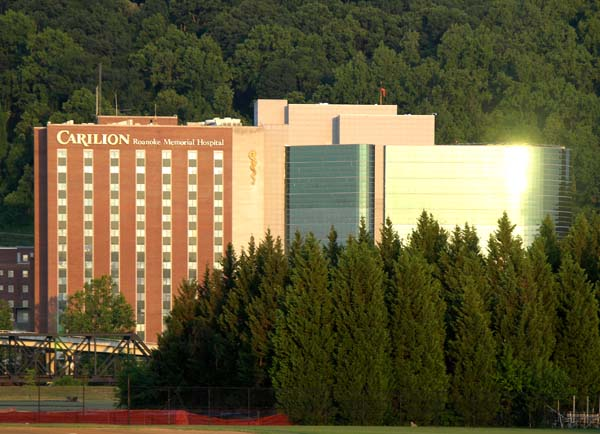
Carilion Roanoke Memorial Hospital has been expanded many times since its opening in 1900.

As of 2023 the city's top employer – and the largest private employer west of Richmond– is Carilion Clinic, which developed from the 1987 merger of two of the area's largest hospitals. The non-profit group employs over 13,000 people. It operates nine hospitals in Western Virginia, along with public-private partnerships with Virginia Tech (Virginia Tech Carilion School of Medicine and Research Institute) and Radford University (Radford University Carilion). The clinic's expansions have spurred considerable development in the former brownfields located south of Roanoke's downtown, turning the once-abandoned industrial sites into an area called the "innovation corridor" by the city.

Another driving factor in the region's economy has been a push during the 21st century to market the area's outdoor recreation potential. The Roanoke Regional Partnership, an economic development group representing the area's municipalities, has created a division called the Roanoke Outside Foundation that seeks to recruit businesses and talent based on the strength of the region's natural amenities. The organization also puts on annual events such as the Blue Ridge Marathon and the GO Outside Festival.

Other areas of strength in the region's economy include manufacturing and retail, each comprising over ten percent of the valley's industry. Transportation manufacturers such as Yokohama Tire, Volvo, Mack Trucks, Metalsa, and Altec contribute to the thousands of people employed in that field regionally. Night-vision device makers Elbit Systems and the fiber optics company Luna Innovations are among the advanced manufacturers in the area.

=== Top employers ===
According to Roanoke's 2024 Comprehensive Annual Financial Report, the top employers in the city are:

#	Employer	# of Employees
1	Carilion Roanoke Memorial Hospital	1,000+
2	Roanoke City Public Schools	1,000+
3	Carilion Services	1,000+
4	City of Roanoke	1,000+
5	United Parcel Service	500 to 999
6	Walmart	250 to 499
7	United States Postal Service	250 to 499
8	Virginia Transformer Corporation	250 to 499
9	YMCA	250 to 499
10	Anthem, member of Blue Cross Blue Shield Association	250 to 499

== Arts and culture ==
Serving as a hub for arts and culture in Southwest Virginia, Roanoke is home to several museums and cultural institutions in addition to being the host of several festivals, many centering around Elmwood Park in downtown Roanoke.

=== Museums ===
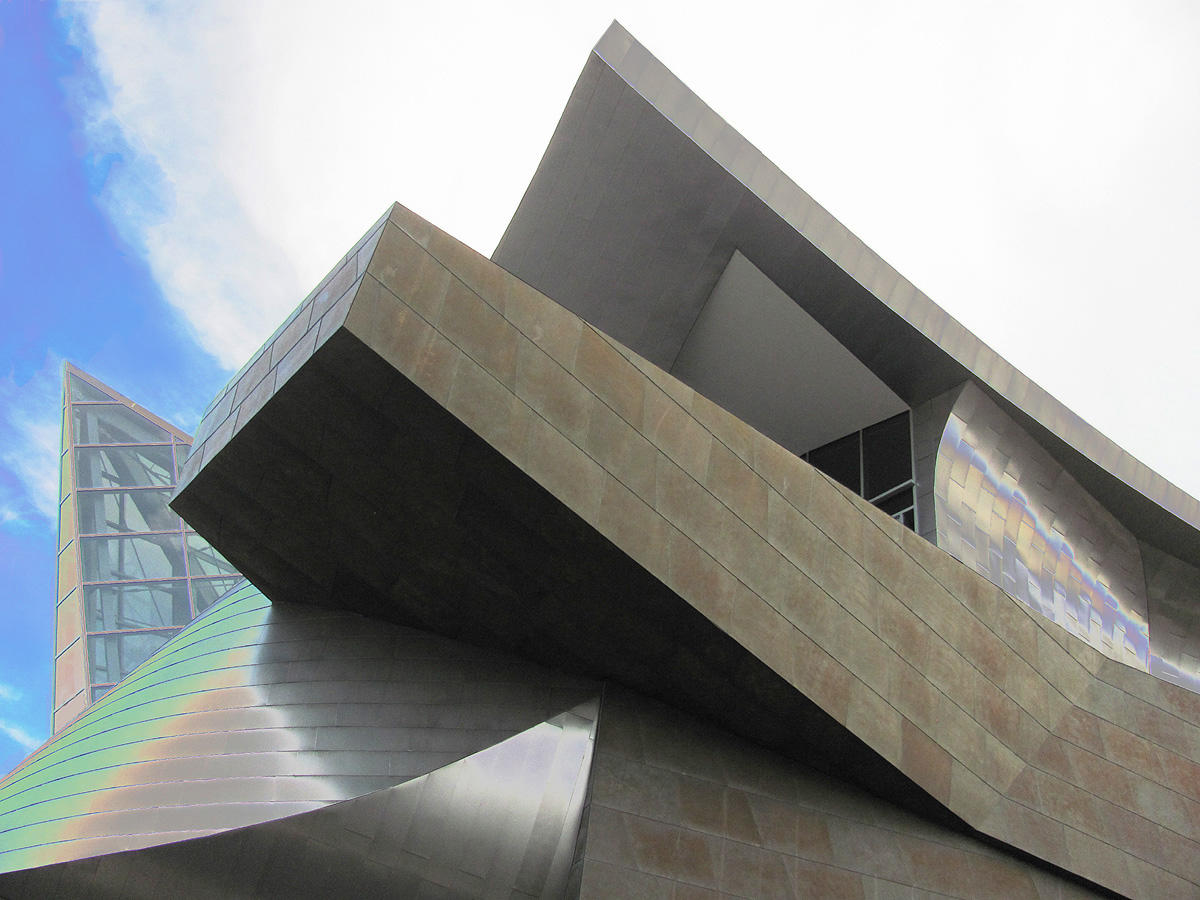
The Taubman Museum of Art

Center in the Square, an arts and culture organization located near downtown's historic market building and farmers' market, was developed alongside the city's "Design '79" downtown revitalization effort and opened in 1983. The center, located in a converted warehouse, originally housed the city's arts council and museum, history and science museums, and the Mill Mountain Theatre. It has since expanded to five buildings, providing space to twelve institutions, including the Science Museum of Western Virginia and Hopkins Planetarium, the Harrison Museum of African American Culture, and the Roanoke Pinball Museum.

One of the original tenants of Center in the Square, the Art Museum of Western Virginia, moved to a downtown Salem Avenue facility in 2008. The move was made with the help of a $15.2 million donation from Nicholas and Jenny Taubman, whose family had established Advance Auto Parts in Roanoke in the 1930s. As a result, the museum was renamed the Taubman Museum of Art. The art museum features 19th and 20th century American art, contemporary and modern art, decorative arts, and works on paper. The 75,000-square-foot (7,000 m^{2}) facility was designed by Los Angeles-based architect Randall Stout, who earlier in his career worked under Frank Gehry. Though the building's avant-garde design was controversial, it has since won international praise for its architecture.

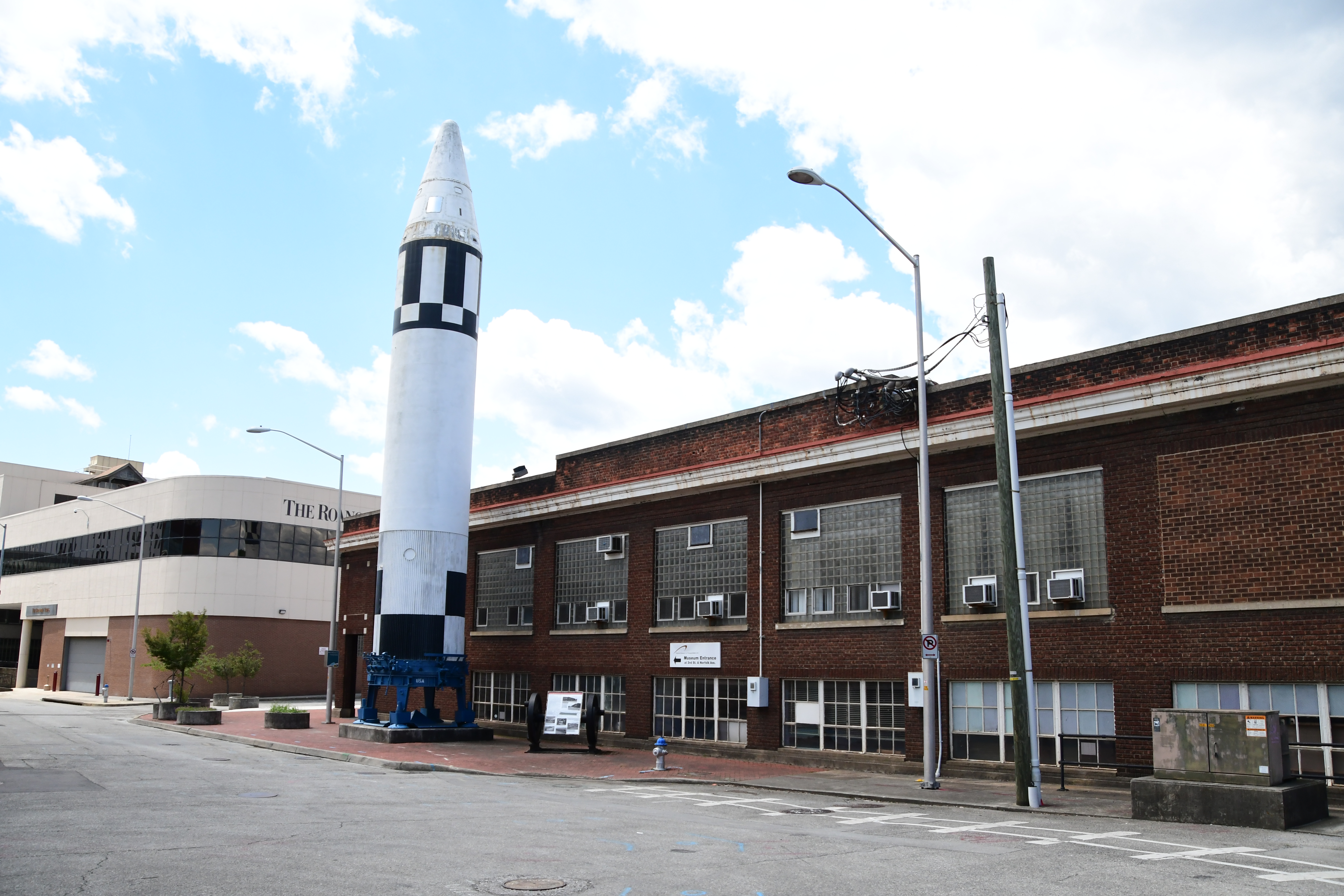
Jupiter Rocket outside the Virginia Museum of Transportation

Also located downtown is the Virginia Museum of Transportation, which houses many locomotives that were built in Roanoke by the Norfolk & Western Railway, including the 1218 and 611 steam engines. A 2013 fundraising campaign led to the engine's refurbishment, and it now does tourist excursion runs when not home at the museum. In addition to its rail exhibits, the museum also displays a US Army Jupiter rocket and houses exhibits covering aviation as well as automobiles. The museum is located in the former Norfolk and Western freight depot which is listed on the National Register of Historic Places.

The former Norfolk and Western Passenger Station hosts two museums: the O. Winston Link Museum, dedicated to the late steam-era railroad photography of O. Winston Link, and the History Museum of Western Virginia. Originally built in 1905, the station underwent a 1949 renovation in the Moderne style by designer Raymond Loewy, and is one of four contributing structures to the Norfolk and Western Railway Company Historic District listed on the National Register of Historic Places.

=== Arts ===
The Berglund Performing Arts Theatre is a 2,150-seat venue within the larger Berglund Center complex. It regularly hosts concerts, touring Broadway theatre performances, stand-up comedy shows, and the Miss Virginia pageant. The city's first permanent artwork funded by the Percent for Art ordinance – a law stating that the city must set aside 1% of its capital improvements budget for the purchasing of public art – stands before the theater. Dedicated in 2008 to celebrate the city's 150th anniversary, the 30-foot (9.1 m) stainless steel sculpture, "In My Hands", is one of over 160 public works of art in Roanoke.

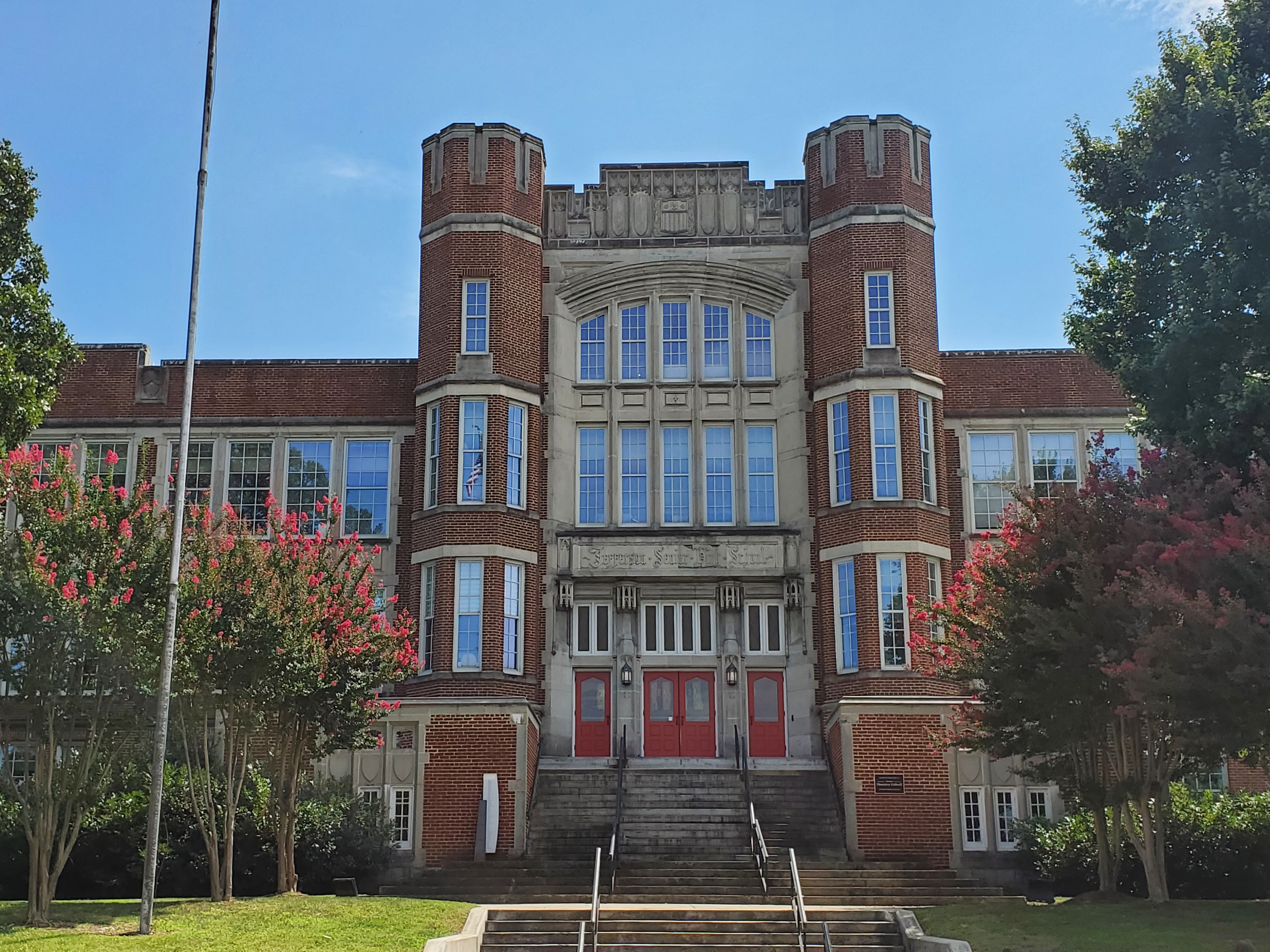
The Jefferson Center as it appeared in 2023. The Tudor Revival building opened as Jefferson High School in 1924.

The Jefferson Center is a former city high school that saw extensive renovation during the 1990s, turning it into a mixed-use building including office space for non-profits and city departments, event space for meetings and receptions, and the Shaftman Performance Hall, a 925-seat theatre created from the original high school's auditorium.

In 2006, the former Dumas Hotel was reopened as the Dumas Center for Artistic and Cultural Development. The center is located on Henry Street, which served as the commercial and cultural center of Roanoke's African-American community before a mid-20th century urban renewal project that saw much of the historic Gainsboro neighborhood razed or relocated. The Dumas Hotel hosted such guests as Louis Armstrong, Ethel Waters, Count Basie, Duke Ellington and Nat King Cole when they performed in Roanoke. The renovated Dumas Center features an auditorium with more than 200 seats, and the building is a contributing structure to the Henry Street Historic District, listed in 2004 to the National Register of Historic Places.

Since 1964, the Roanoke Valley has hosted performances by the Mill Mountain Theatre, a regional theatre that has been located in Center in the Square since its original home atop Mill Mountain burned down in 1976. The theatre has both a main stage for mainstream performances and a smaller black box theatre called Waldron Stage, which hosts both newer and more experimental plays along with other live events.

Roanoke has been home to the Showtimers Community Theatre since 1951, and since 2008, the Virginia Children's Theatre has presented shows aimed at a younger audience, often based on children's literature. Originally formed as Roanoke Children's Theatre and housed in the Taubman Museum at that building's opening, the theatre expanded into the Dumas Center in 2013, and in 2016 moved to its current home in the Jefferson Center.

Opera Roanoke is Southwest Virginia's only professional opera company, established in 1976 as the Southwest Virginia Opera Society. It has performed under its current name since 1991, and its official orchestra since 2004 has been the Roanoke Symphony Orchestra. That group was established in 1953. The orchestra performs out of the Berglund Performing Arts Theatre, Salem Civic Center, and Shaftman Performance Hall at Jefferson Center.

=== Points of interest ===
Roanoke is the largest metropolitan area on the Blue Ridge Parkway, a 469-mile-long scenic road that is the most-visited element of the National Park System. The Mill Mountain Parkway exit off of the Blue Ridge Parkway leads to the Roanoke Star, an 88.5-foot-tall (27.0 m) illuminated star sitting atop a mountain inside the city's limits. Also on the mountain's summit is Mill Mountain Zoo, a Zoological Association of America-accredited facility housing over 170 animals.

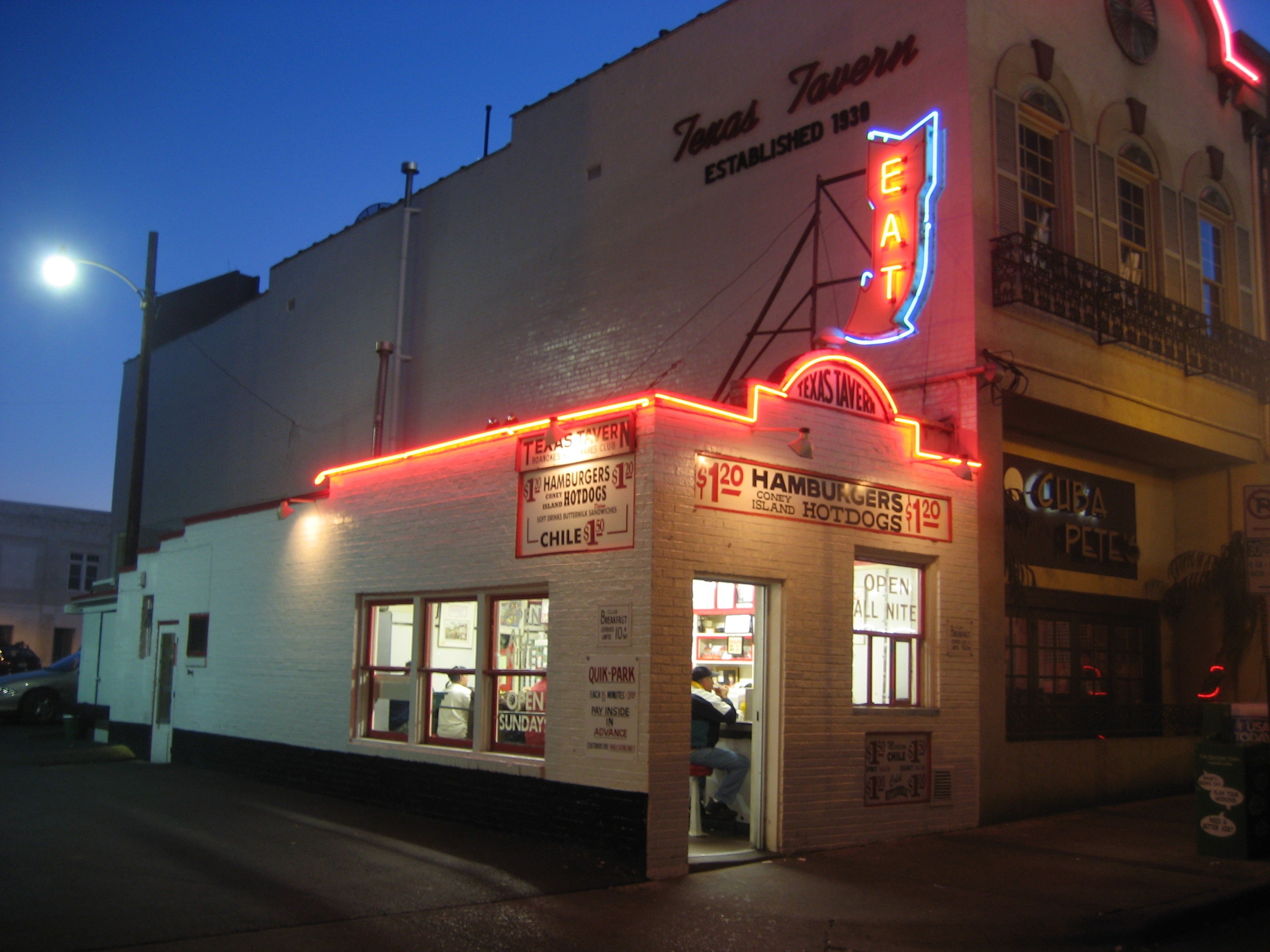
The Texas Tavern has changed little since its establishment in 1930.

The Basilica of St. Andrew rests on a hill overlooking downtown and has been called "one of Virginia's foremost examples of the High Victorian Gothic". The church dates to 1900, and was listed on the National Register of Historic Places (NRHP) in 1973. Just below the church lies the Hotel Roanoke, a historic 330-room Tudor Revival hotel originally built by the Norfolk and Western Railway in 1882 and rebuilt and expanded many times since. Nicknamed the "Grand Old Lady", the hotel was listed on the NRHP in 1995.

A pedestrian bridge leads from the Hotel Roanoke to the city's historic market building and farmers' market, the latter of which dates to 1882 and is the oldest continuously operating open-air market in Virginia. Near the terminus of the market is Fire Station No. 1, which for a time was the oldest continuously operating station in the state. The Georgian Revival structure was listed on the NRHP in 1973, and currently houses a local furniture showroom, restaurant, and boutique hotel. Two blocks west on the same street is Texas Tavern, an "iconic" ten-seat greasy spoon restaurant that the same family has operated since its establishment in 1930.

=== Festivals ===
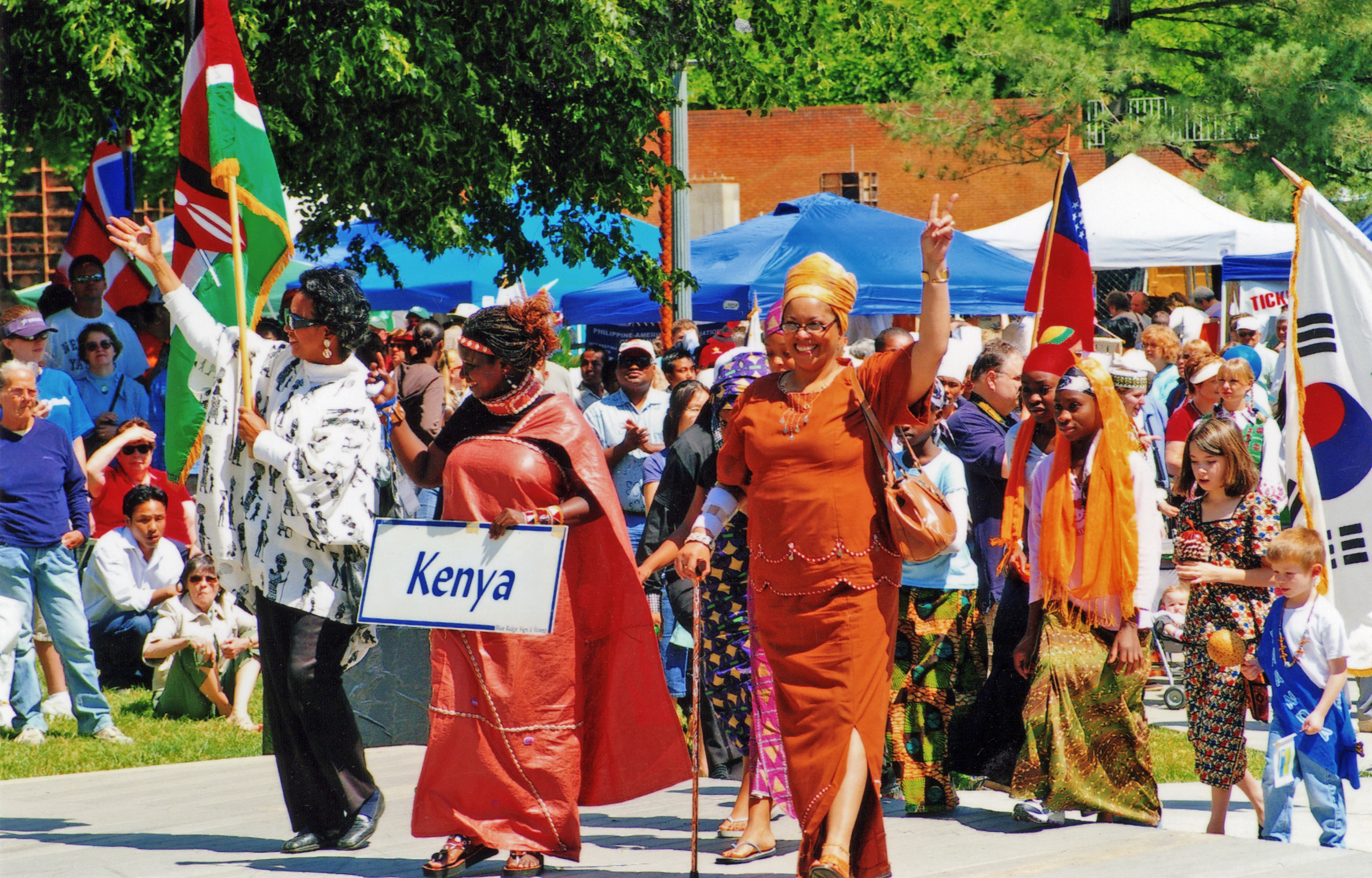
Parade of Nations at the Local Colors Festival

Roanoke features several annual festivals and events of various types. A parade for St. Patrick's Day occurs every March, and Pride in the Park is an LGBTQ+ community celebration that draws thousands of visitors every April. Several events occur in May, including the Local Colors festival celebrating the cultures of the area's diverse ethnicities, the city's Strawberry Festival, the Down by Downtown music festival which coincides with the Blue Ridge Marathon, and Memorial Day weekend's Festival in the Park, which brings music and vendors to downtown Elmwood Park.

Later in the year, Elmwood Park hosts the Henry Street Heritage Festival, the primary fundraiser for the Harrison Museum of African American Culture. The event's popularity necessitated the move from its eponymous location. The Go Outside Festival, also known as GO Fest, is a free three-day event every October that celebrates the region's outdoor recreation opportunities, and the city holds the multi-week Dickens of a Christmas each December. This Victorian era-themed event includes a Christmas tree lighting, parade, and horse-drawn carriage rides through downtown.

== Sports ==
The 1971–1972 Virginia Squires of the American Basketball Association were the only major league sports team to play home games in Roanoke regularly. During that season, the Squires split home games between Richmond, Norfolk, Hampton Roads and Roanoke. Julius Erving played his professional rookie season with the Squires that year before being sent to the New York Nets.

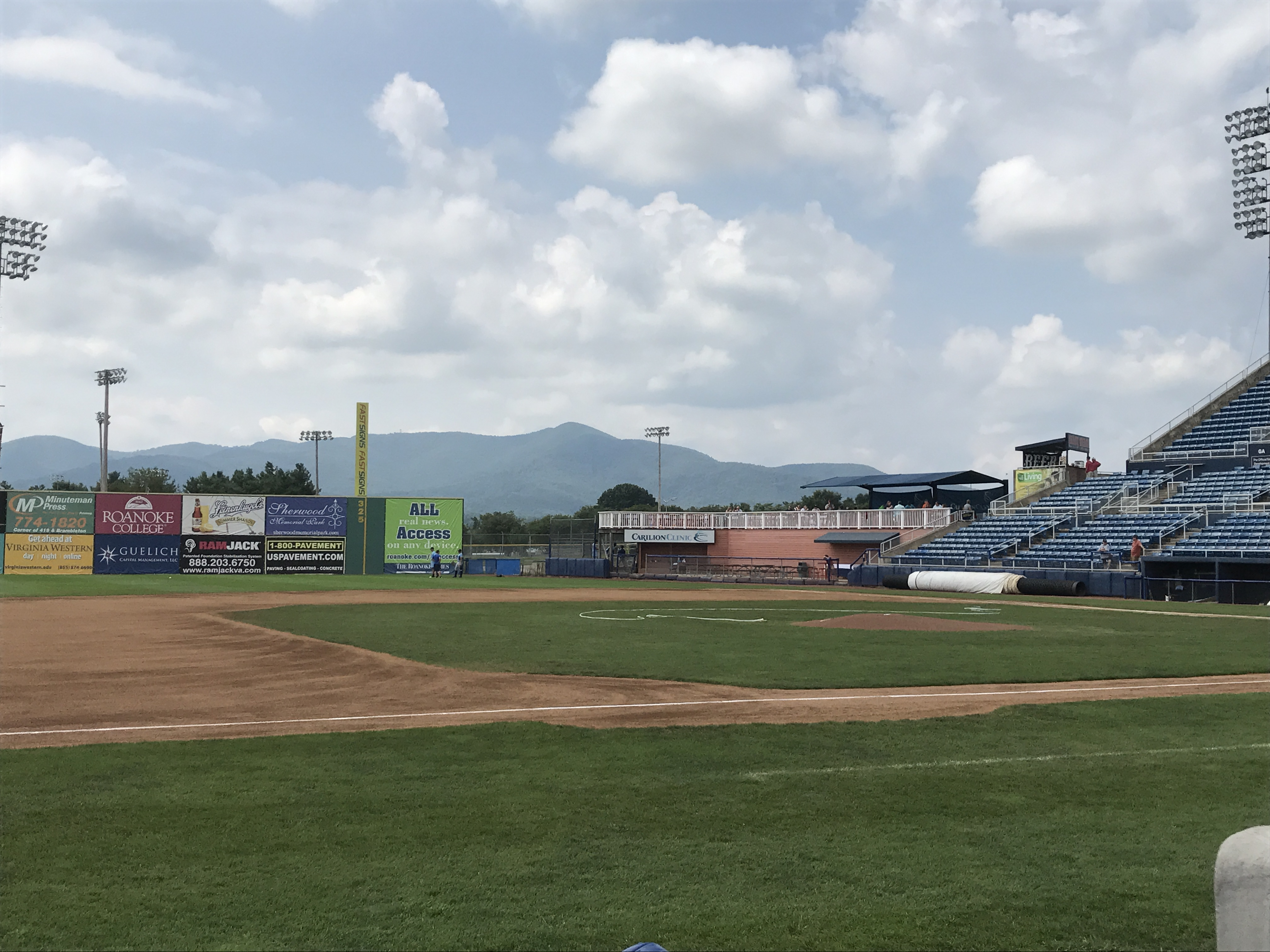
The Blue Ridge Mountains viewed from Salem Memorial Ballpark

Minor league baseball has had a long history in the Roanoke Valley. In the 1940s and early 1950s, Roanoke was home to a class B farm team of the Boston Red Sox. Since 1955, neighboring Salem has hosted the local minor league baseball team, which as of 2026 is the Salem RidgeYaks of the Low-A Carolina League. The team changed its name from the Salem Red Sox to the Salem RidgeYaks in November 2025. The team had previously been affiliated with the Houston Astros and Colorado Rockies and known as the Avalanche until becoming an affiliate of the Boston Red Sox, whose ownership group purchased the Avalanche after the 2007 season.

The history of minor league hockey in the Roanoke Valley goes back to 1967. The Roanoke Express of the ECHL built a loyal following in the mid-1990s, but a combination of financial turmoil due to mismanagement and declining attendance from a lack of post-season success led to the ECHL ending their franchise in 2004. An attempt at a revival in 2005–06 by the UHL's Roanoke Valley Vipers failed after one season. In 2016, professional ice hockey returned to Roanoke after ten years when the Roanoke Rail Yard Dawgs of the SPHL began to play, and the team won its first-ever President's Cup title in 2023.

While the Roanoke area is not home to any NCAA Division I schools, its proximity to Virginia Tech has led it to host some collegiate athletic events. Beginning in 1977, Roanoke, along with Richmond, was one of the primary neutral sites for the annual basketball game between Virginia Tech and the Virginia Cavaliers. In 2000 the schools started holding these games in campus facilities.

From 1913, Roanoke played host to an annual football game between Virginia Tech and the Virginia Military Institute, first at Maher Field and then in the newly constructed Victory Stadium starting in 1942. The game was moved to Thanksgiving Day beginning in the early 1920s and was a holiday mainstay in the city until 1971.

Roanoke's location among the Blue Ridge Mountains makes it a destination for other sporting events. Every year since 2010 (barring 2020, when it was held virtually due to the COVID-19 pandemic), the Roanoke Outside Foundation has put on the Blue Ridge Marathon, which is regarded as difficult due to its considerable elevation changes. The USA Cycling Amateur Road National Championships were held in the city and surrounding areas in 2022 and 2023, and an Ironman 70.3 triathlon event brought competitors to the region from 2021–2023.

== Parks and recreation ==
There are 60 parks within Roanoke's city limits, and its parks and recreation department is responsible for nearly 14,000 acres of public land. Highland Park in the historic Old Southwest neighborhood is the city's oldest, having been purchased in 1902 when the former farm was still distant from the settled part of the city. Elmwood Park in downtown Roanoke became the city's second in 1911. It features a Japanese magnolia tree that was acquired by Commodore Matthew Perry during an expedition to Japan and donated in 1857 to the former owner of the park. As of 2023 Elmwood holds the city's main library branch as well as an art walk and a 4,000-seat amphitheater.

Roanoke features an extensive network of paved greenways for walkers, runners, and cyclists. Though the idea for a publicly owned greenway system can be traced back to a 1907 comprehensive plan for the city, it was not until 1995 that an intergovernmental committee was formed to plan and develop the project. Since that time, 26 miles (42 km) of greenways have been built across the Roanoke Valley. As of 2023, the longest continuous stretch runs 12 miles (19 km) along the Roanoke River from Salem through Roanoke City to Vinton. Roanoke County is also in the planning stages of extending that same stretch westward into Montgomery County. As of 2023, Roanoke contained over 100 miles (160 km) of trails and greenways.

== Government ==
United States presidential election results for Roanoke, Virginia
Year	Republican		Democratic		Third party(ies)	
Year	No.	%	No.	%	No.	%
1884	568	47.77%	621	52.23%	0	0.00%
1888	535	40.50%	719	54.43%	67	5.07%
1892	1,870	39.93%	2,707	57.80%	106	2.26%
1896	1,697	44.74%	2,005	52.86%	91	2.40%
1900	1,120	37.51%	1,761	58.98%	105	3.52%
1904	506	27.82%	1,268	69.71%	45	2.47%
1908	593	29.56%	1,408	70.19%	5	0.25%
1912	268	9.77%	1,913	69.74%	562	20.49%
1916	610	20.68%	2,246	76.14%	94	3.19%
1920	2,329	32.60%	4,715	66.00%	100	1.40%
1924	1,747	27.15%	3,930	61.07%	758	11.78%
1928	6,471	61.69%	4,018	38.31%	0	0.00%
1932	3,195	33.49%	6,215	65.15%	130	1.36%
1936	3,363	32.02%	7,087	67.47%	54	0.51%
1940	3,553	33.70%	6,942	65.85%	47	0.45%
1944	5,095	40.92%	7,322	58.81%	34	0.27%
1948	6,542	49.56%	5,343	40.48%	1,315	9.96%
1952	15,673	66.00%	8,042	33.87%	32	0.13%
1956	16,708	69.38%	6,751	28.03%	623	2.59%
1960	15,229	62.28%	9,175	37.52%	49	0.20%
1964	13,164	46.20%	15,314	53.74%	18	0.06%
1968	15,368	51.21%	9,281	30.93%	5,359	17.86%
1972	18,541	64.67%	9,498	33.13%	632	2.20%
1976	14,738	41.00%	20,696	57.57%	515	1.43%
1980	15,164	43.39%	18,139	51.91%	1,643	4.70%
1984	19,008	52.09%	17,300	47.41%	184	0.50%
1988	15,389	46.90%	17,185	52.37%	239	0.73%
1992	13,443	38.21%	17,724	50.38%	4,014	11.41%
1996	12,283	38.37%	17,282	53.98%	2,451	7.66%
2000	14,630	43.75%	17,920	53.59%	892	2.67%
2004	16,661	46.28%	18,862	52.39%	477	1.33%
2008	15,394	37.76%	24,934	61.15%	444	1.09%
2012	14,991	37.33%	24,134	60.10%	1,030	2.57%
2016	14,789	37.47%	22,286	56.47%	2,391	6.06%
2020	15,607	36.02%	26,773	61.80%	943	2.18%
2024	15,787	37.31%	25,737	60.82%	790	1.87%

Like most cities in Virginia, Roanoke has a council-manager form of government. The city manager maintains the day-to-day operation of the city's government and has the authority to hire and fire city employees. The mayor has little executive authority and is essentially the "first among equals" on the Roanoke City Council, though the position wields influence through public appearances and annual State of the City addresses.

The city council has six members, not counting the mayor, all of whom are elected on an at-large basis. A proposal for a ward-based council was rejected by Roanoke voters in 1997, but ward system advocates still contend that the at-large system results in a disproportionate number of council members coming from affluent neighborhoods and that electing some or all council members on a ward basis would result in a more equal representation of all areas of the city. The four-year terms of city council members are staggered, with three members elected every two years. The candidate who receives the most votes is designated the vice mayor for the following two years.

On June 27, 2016, Sherman P. Lea Sr. took the office of mayor, and he was re-elected to the same position in 2020. The current city manager, Bob Cowell, has been in that position since 2017. Joe Cobb is serving his second term as the city's vice mayor.

The city has adopted a budget for the 2024 fiscal year that includes revenues and expenditures totaling $355.4 million, representing a 9.4% increase over the previous year. Local taxes, including real estate, personal property, and sales taxes, are the government's largest source of revenue at over 70% of its intake.

Roanoke is represented by two members of the Virginia House of Delegates, Sam Rasoul (D-11th) and Chris Head (R-17th), and one member of the Virginia Senate, John Edwards (D-21st). In February 2023, Edwards announced his intention to retire after 28 years in the state senate. The city lies within Virginia's 6th congressional district, which also includes Lynchburg and much of the Shenandoah Valley. Since 2019 the district has been represented by Republican Ben Cline.

Roanoke is one of the few Democratic pockets in the otherwise heavily Republican Southwest Virginia. It has supported the Democratic Party nominee in every election since 1988 and in all but one election since 1976.

== Education ==
Two four-year private institutions are situated in neighboring localities – Roanoke College in the city of Salem, and Hollins University in Roanoke County. Virginia Tech and Radford University's main campuses are located in the nearby New River Valley, and both of those schools have partnered with Carilion Clinic, the regional nonprofit health care organization based in Roanoke, to create medical colleges in the city. Virginia Tech Carilion School of Medicine and Research Institute was founded in 2007, and Radford University Carilion was established in 2019. The Roanoke Higher Education Center opened in 2000 in the former Norfolk and Western General Office Building–North, and provides over 150 programs ranging from high school equivalent degrees to doctorates. Virginia Western Community College is located in the city and provides associate degrees as well as facilitated transfers to many four-year colleges in the area. ECPI University, a private for-profit institution, also has a campus located in Roanoke.

The local public school division is Roanoke City Public Schools. The two general enrollment public high schools in the city are Patrick Henry High School, located in the Raleigh Court area, and William Fleming High School, located in Northwest Roanoke.

A prominent parochial school in the city is Roanoke Catholic, which dates to 1889 and shares its campus with the Basilica of St. Andrew. Private non-parochial schools in Roanoke include Community High School of Arts and Academics. The school was first housed in the Jefferson Center before moving to its current location in downtown Roanoke in 2011.

== Media ==
The city's daily newspaper, The Roanoke Times, has been published since 1886. As of 2023, weekday and Sunday circulation both average around 25,000. In 2013 the paper was sold to Berkshire Hathaway, which in turn sold its BH Media holdings – The Roanoke Times included – to Lee Enterprises in 2020. Beth Macy, author of the bestselling book Dopesick which was adapted into a 2021 Hulu miniseries of the same name, was a reporter at The Roanoke Times for 25 years. The Roanoke Star and Cardinal News are independent digital newspapers that have sought to fill the local news coverage gap resulting from the purchase of The Roanoke Times by an out-of-state publisher and its subsequent reduction in staff.

The weekly Roanoke Tribune covers the city's African-American community. The publication was founded in 1939 by the Rev. Fleming Alexander and since 1971 has been owned and edited by his daughter. The Roanoker is the area's bi-monthly lifestyle magazine and has been published since 1972 by Leisure Publishing, which also puts out the bi-monthly Blue Ridge Country magazine.

Roanoke and Lynchburg are grouped in the same television market, which as of 2022 ranks #71 in the United States with 456,390 households. The city's major network stations include NBC affiliate WSLS-TV 10, CBS affiliate WDBJ 7, Fox affiliate WFXR 27, PBS member WBRA-TV, and ION Television affiliate WPXR-TV. ABC affiliate WSET-TV 13 and CW affiliate WWCW 21 are licensed to Lynchburg; MyNetworkTV affiliate WZBJ is licensed to Danville. The Roanoke-Lynchburg radio market has a population of 451,600 and is ranked number 122 in the United States as of 2022. iHeartMedia owns many stations in the area, including WROV, WJJS, WYYD, and WSTV.

The reality television show Salvage Dawgs was based out of Roanoke. The show, which ran for 11 seasons on the DIY Network, followed the owners and employees of the architectural salvage company Black Dog Salvage as they located and acquired pieces for their store. Some of the company's projects in Roanoke itself were highlighted on the show, including their part in the renovation of Fire Station No. 1.

== Infrastructure ==
=== Transportation ===
Interstate 581, the primary north–south roadway in the city, connects Roanoke to Interstate 81 to the north. Interstate 581 is a concurrency with U.S. Route 220, which continues as the Roy L. Webber Expressway from downtown Roanoke, where the I-581 designation ends, south to State Route 419. Route 220 continues south to connect Roanoke to Martinsville, Virginia, and Greensboro, North Carolina; a proposed extension of Interstate 73 into Roanoke from North Carolina, running partially concurrent with and parallel to US 220, has long been stalled due to funding issues.

The primary east–west roadway through the city is U.S. Route 460, named Melrose Avenue and Orange Avenue. Route 460 connects Roanoke to Lynchburg to the east and Christiansburg to the west. U.S. Route 11 passes through the city, primarily as Brandon Avenue and Williamson Road, which was a center of automotive-based commercial development after World War II. Other major roads include U.S. Route 221, State Route 117 (known as Peters Creek Road) and State Route 101 (known as Hershberger Road). The Blue Ridge Parkway also briefly runs adjacent to the city border.

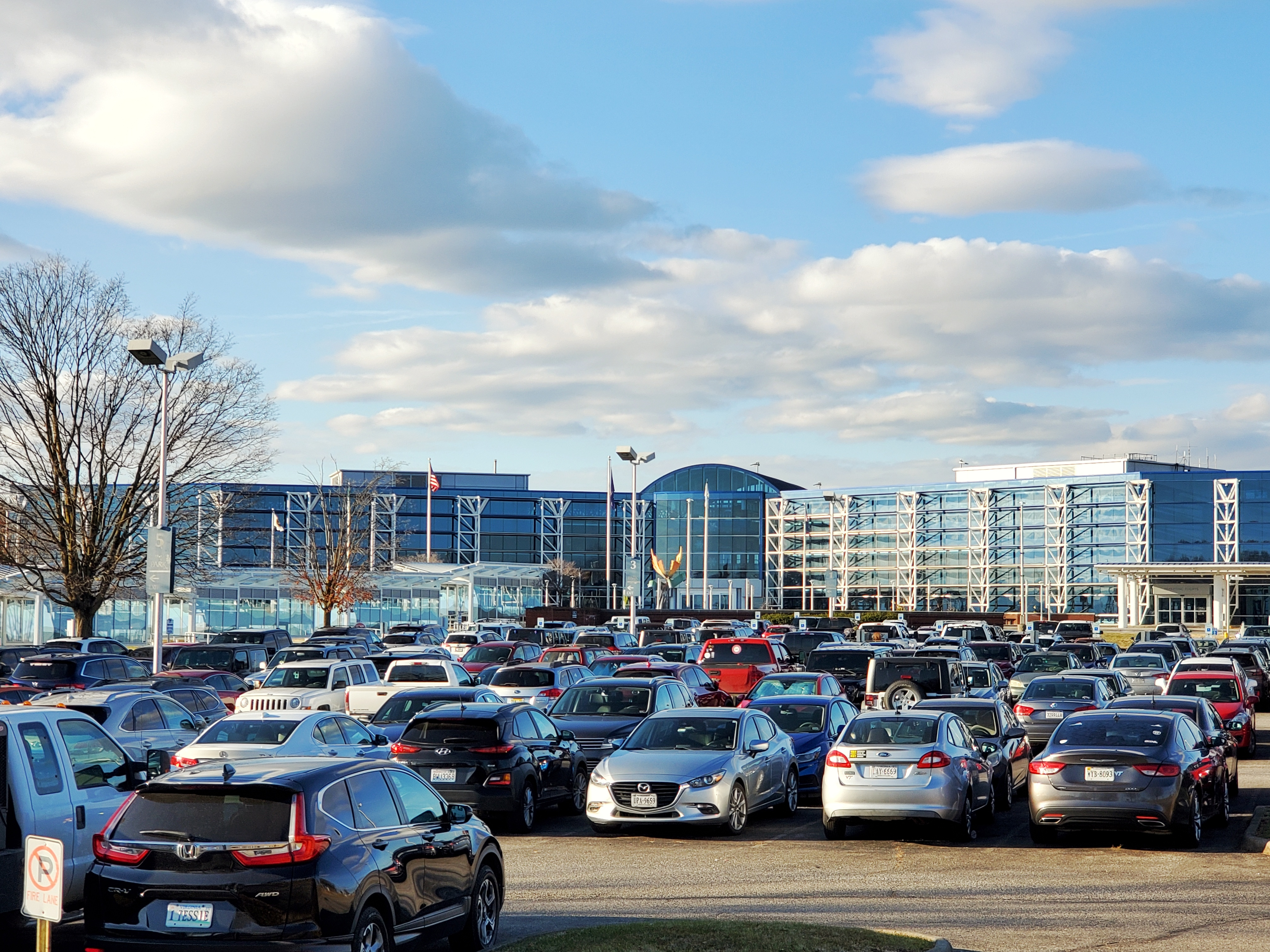
Roanoke–Blacksburg Regional Airport terminal building

The Roanoke–Blacksburg Regional Airport is located in the northern part of the city. It is the primary passenger and cargo airport for Southwest Virginia. The airport is served by American Airlines, United Airlines, Delta and Allegiant Air. Due to the facility's size, location in the mountains, and proximity to Andrews Air Force Base, it is often used as a pilot training destination for the Special Air Mission fleet that serves as Air Force One and Two when the nation's leaders are aboard.

While Roanoke is known for its rail history, low ridership numbers led Amtrak to discontinue passenger rail service to the city in 1979. Beginning in 2011, Roanoke funded a bus service, the Smart Way Connector, to connect riders to the Amtrak station in Lynchburg as well as to show Amtrak that there was once again a demand for the service in Roanoke. In August 2013, it was announced that Amtrak's Northeast Regional service would be extended from Lynchburg by 2017. On October 31, 2017, after 38 years without passenger rail service, Amtrak resumed service to Roanoke. The service has been successful enough that a second daily train to Roanoke was added in 2022.

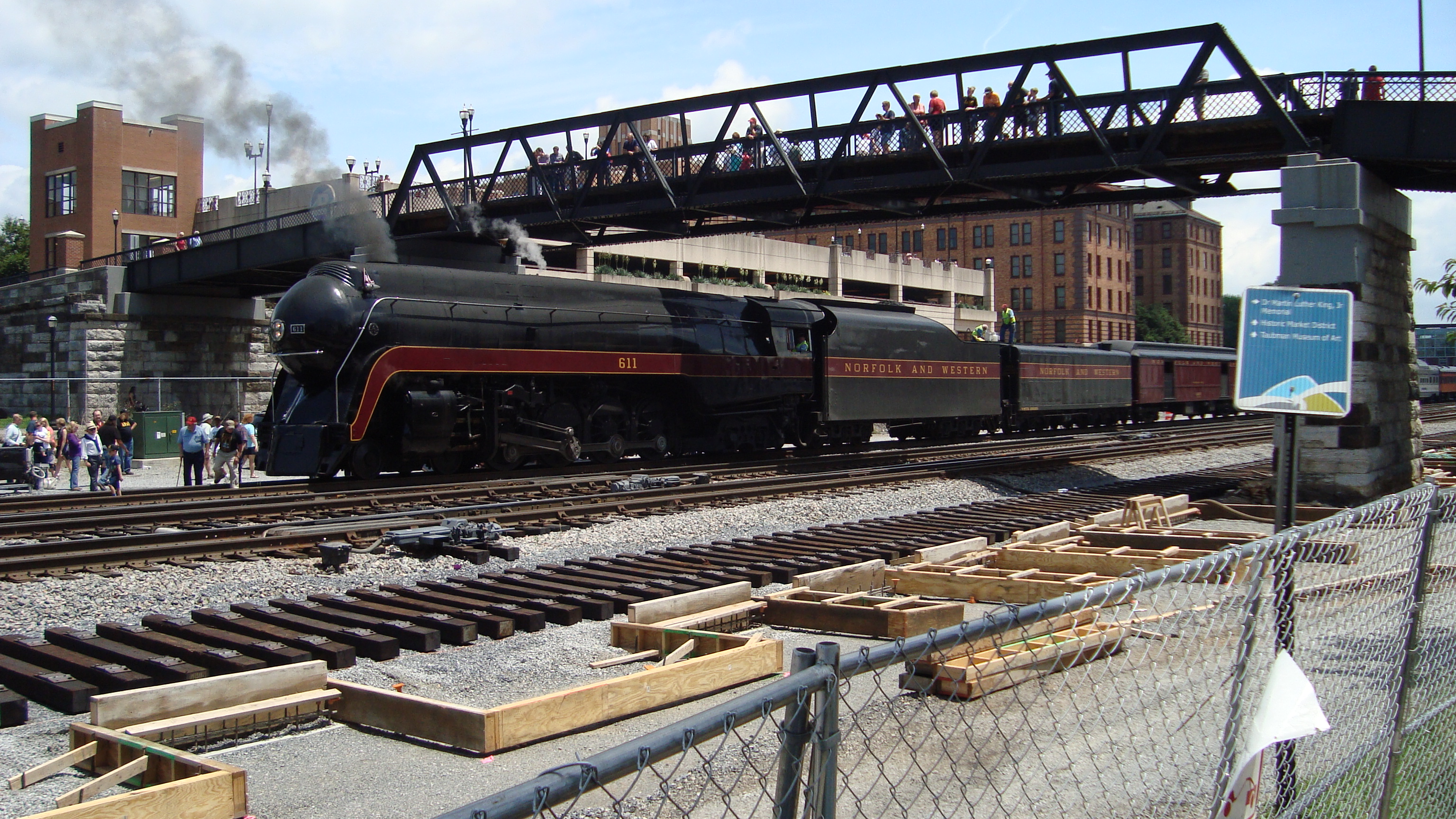
The N&W 611 waiting at Roanoke station in 2017

Despite Norfolk Southern's relocation of its corporate headquarters out of the city, Roanoke is still a major hub in the company's freight rail system. The railway's Pocahontas Division, consisting of over 2,500 miles (4,000 km) of track, is headquartered just outside of downtown Roanoke, and though the volume of coal passing through the city has declined in recent decades, 70 million tons of freight are shipped on the area's railroads annually.

The Valley Metro provides bus service to the city of Roanoke and surrounding areas. In June 2023, the service began operating out of a new facility on Third Street in downtown Roanoke, built to replace the aging Campbell Court station. Valley Metro also offers bus service to Blacksburg, Christiansburg and Virginia Tech via its Smart Way service, as well as the Ferrum Express, a free shuttle that runs between downtown Roanoke and Ferrum College in nearby Rocky Mount.

The 21st century has seen Roanoke put considerable resources towards improving its cycling infrastructure. In addition to its extensive paved greenway network, Roanoke has added 43 miles of marked bike lanes along its major roads. In recent years, the city has put millions of dollars towards pedestrian safety improvements, including lane reductions on busy roads, audible signals, and additional street lighting. Roanoke is served by RIDE Solutions, a regional transportation demand management agency that provides carpool matching, cycling advocacy, transit assistance and remote work assistance to businesses and citizens in the region.

=== Utilities ===
Roanoke is supplied electricity by the Appalachian Power Company, an American Electric Power division. Appalachian Power serves roughly 500,000 people in Western Virginia and another 500,000 in West Virginia and Tennessee. The area's water and wastewater operations are managed by the Western Virginia Water Authority. That organization was founded in 2004 with the consolidation of the water utilities of Roanoke City and Roanoke County, under the logic that the location of watersheds should determine the management of local resources rather than government boundaries. The Water Authority has since taken on the water-based utilities of Franklin and Botetourt Counties as well as the towns of Boones Mill and Vinton.

=== Healthcare ===
Roanoke is the primary center for healthcare in Western Virginia, serving an estimated one million people. Carilion Clinic, a non-profit healthcare group, is the region's largest provider with over 750 physicians spread across eight hospitals. The region is also served by the Lewis-Gale Medical Center, a 521-bed facility established in Roanoke in 1911 and now located in Salem, as well as a Veterans Affairs Medical Center serving over 100,000 military veterans in the region, also located in Salem.

== Sister cities ==
Roanoke has six sister cities:

- Florianópolis, Brazil
- Kisumu, Kenya
- Lijiang, China
- Opole, Poland
- Saint-Lô, France
- Wonju, South Korea

In February 2023, it was announced that the city was officially pausing its sister city affiliation with Pskov, Russia, due to the continuing Russian invasion of Ukraine.

== See also ==
- National Register of Historic Places listings in Roanoke, Virginia
- USS Roanoke, 7 ships
