= Texas Tavern =

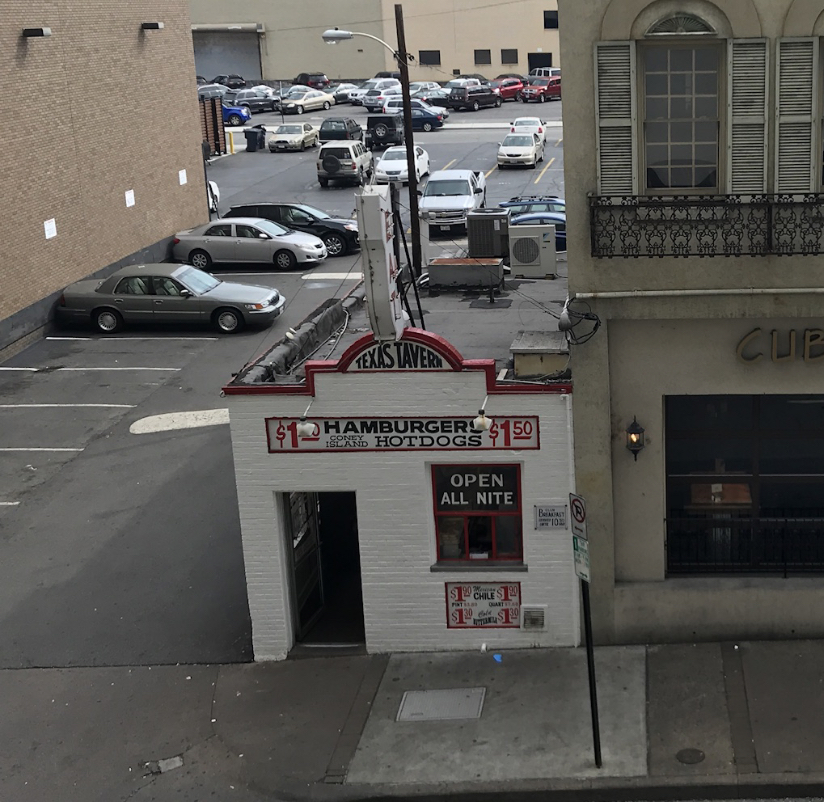
- Texas Tavern from above on Church Ave

Restaurant information
- Established: February 13, 1930
- Owner: James Matthew Bullington
- Previous owners: Issac N. Bullington; James G. Bullington; James N. Bullington
- Food type: Fast food
- Location: 114 Church Ave SW, Roanoke, Roanoke County, Virginia, 24011, United States
- Seating capacity: 10 stools
- Nickname: Roanoke's Millionaire's Club
- Website: texastavern-inc.com

Texas Tavern is a family-owned restaurant and place of cultural significance in Roanoke, Virginia, United States.

== History ==
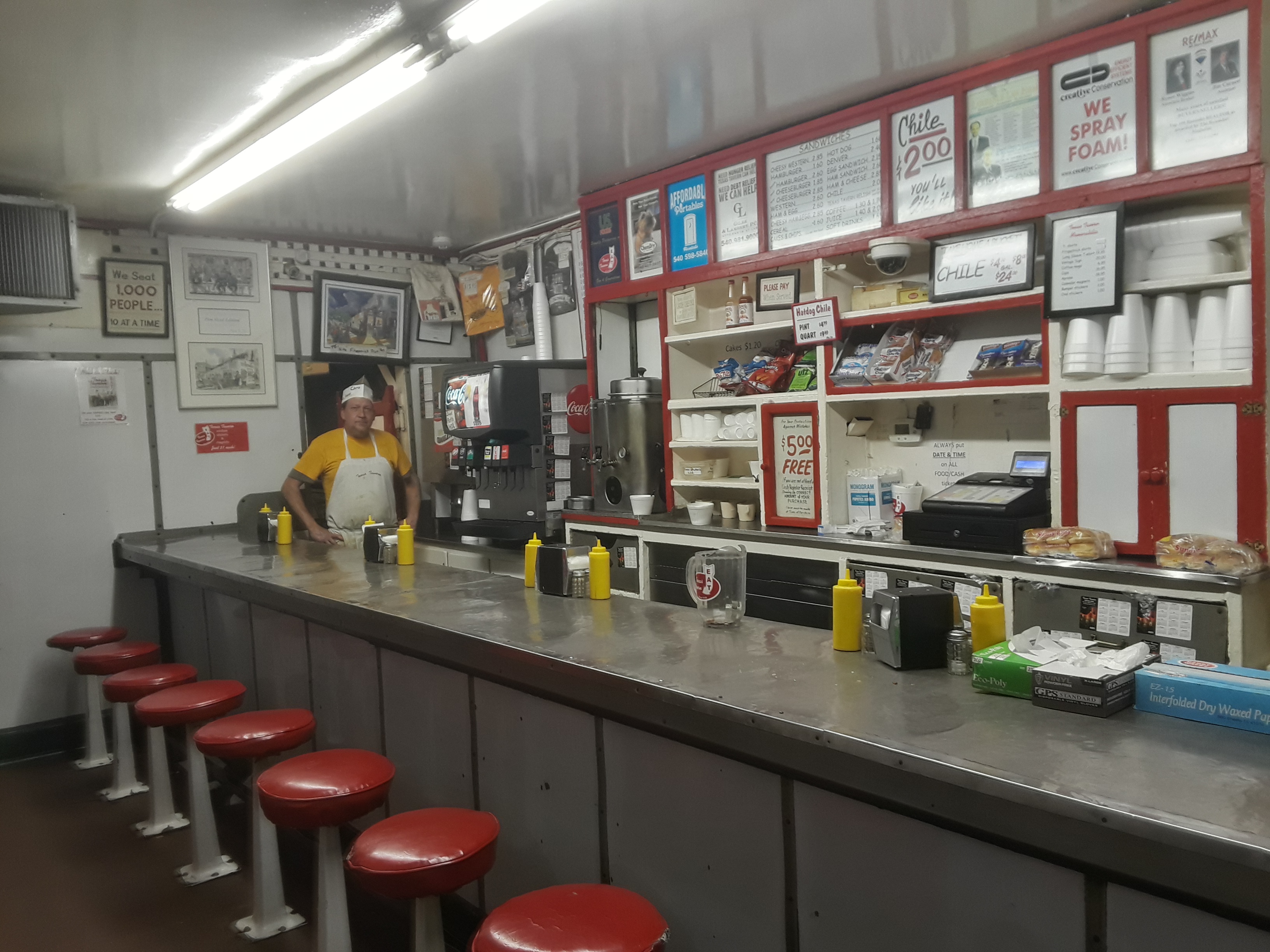
Interior of the restaurant in July, 2021

Issac N. (Nick) Bullington, an advance man for the Ringling Brothers Circus, opened the Texas Tavern in 1930. As part of his job for the circus, he traveled ahead of the circus booking shows. While on business in San Antonio, Texas, Bullington discovered a chili recipe that inspired his opening of the restaurant. Later, when Bullington settled in Roanoke, he opened the restaurant in the Thurman and Boone Furniture store parking lot on Church Ave. The Bullington family has passed ownership down generations. When Nick Bullington passed in 1942, his son James G. became the owner. James G. passed ownership to his son, James N., who passed ownership to his son, James Matthew, in February 2005. The latter Bullington still owns and operates the establishment today.

Typical of restaurants from its era, the interior of the building features a grill just inside the front window; the entire cooking and preparation area is six feet square. Little on the menu has changed since the restaurant's foundation. Besides chili (spelled "chile" on the menu, as it was at the restaurant's founding and has been ever since), it features a variety of hamburgers and hot dogs, as well as many breakfast items. Soft drinks are served, but nothing alcoholic. The restaurant still does not accept payment cards and operates as a cash-only business. The building remains essentially unchanged since its founding; the only substantial renovations have been repairs to the griddle made in 1975. Parking is available onsite, as is an ATM.

The "Cheesy Western", a cheeseburger with fried egg, pickles, and sweet relish, was invented in 1929 by Isaac Billington and is a staple of the restaurant's menu. It was identified as one of the 20 best burgers in Virginia by Thrillist in 2015. In May 2025 it was featured on the menu of Hamburger America restaurant in Manhattan. George Motz featured the burger in an article for Southern Living, in which he stated that his preferred version contains three patties and a small amount of chili; he also listed the restaurant in his 2008 book, Hamburger America: A State-by-State Guide to 100 Great Burger Joints.

== Culture ==
Many famous individuals have visited Texas Tavern, including Harry Connick, Jr., Mike Pence, Kevin Costner, and many others. The restaurant has long been a fixture in the neighborhood, known for its regular customer base.

The restaurant is sometimes referred to as "Roanoke's Millionaires Club". It features a sign boasting, "We seat 1,000 people, 10 at a time."
