= Annette Hoyt Flanders =

American landscape architect

- Born: Annette Ladd Hoyt; September 16, 1887; Milwaukee, Wisconsin, U.S.
- Died: June 7, 1946 (aged 58); Milwaukee, Wisconsin, U.S.
- Burial place: Forest Home Cemetery
- Education: Smith College (BA); University of Illinois (BS)
- Occupation: Landscape architect
- Spouse: Roger Yale Flanders (m. 1913; div. 1920)

Annette Hoyt Flanders was an American landscape architect. Her work on residential gardens was primarily in the Eastern and Midwestern United States. She was recognized in House & Garden's Hall of Fame in 1930 and elected a Fellow of the American Society of Landscape Architects in 1942.

== Early life and education ==
Annette Ladd Hoyt was born on September 16, 1887, in Milwaukee, Wisconsin, to parents Frank M. Hoyt, a prominent attorney, and Hettie Pamelia Hoyt. Her early education consisted of tutors and private schools until she attended Smith College, where she earned her B.A. in botany in 1914. She then attended the University of Illinois for her B.S. in landscape architecture, graduating in 1918. Hoyt also studied civil engineering and architecture at Marquette University. She married lawyer Roger Yale Flanders in 1913, becoming Annette Hoyt Flanders, and retained the name following their divorce in 1920.

== Career ==
From 1918 to 1919, after graduating from university, Flanders served with the American Red Cross in France. When she returned to the U.S. she joined Vitale, Brinckerhoff, and Geiffert, a landscape architecture firm in New York, and was responsible for design and planting supervision.

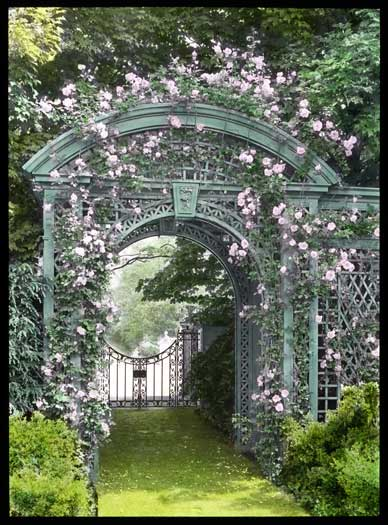
Treillage at the McCann Estate French Gardens in Oyster Bay, NY

In 1922, Flanders opened her own office in New York. Her projects included private estates, real estate subdivisions, industrial plants, recreational developments, and exhibit gardens around the United States. She employed landscape architects Helen Swift Jones and Helen Elise Bullard. In 1942, she closed this New York office and reopened her office in her hometown of Milwaukee in 1943. Flanders’s most notable projects included the Phipps Estate, the Morven Farm Gardens, and the McCann Estate French Gardens. In 1932, the McCann Estate French Gardens won Flanders the Architectural League of New York's Medal of Honor in Landscape Architecture.

In her work, Flanders emphasized minimizing the amount of grading required for a design. She argued instead that landscape designs should adhere to the natural form of the land. She drew inspiration from several different styles, including the Beaux Arts, Midwestern naturalism, and Modernism.

Flanders lectured extensively to horticultural and botanical societies, women's clubs, and schools. She wrote for several publications, including House & Garden, Country Life in America, and House Beautiful, promoting simple, livable, and economical garden design. Flanders was also the consultant garden editor for the Good Housekeeping magazine from 1933 to 1934, and published a series on suburban garden design.

In 1930, Flanders was recognized in House and Garden's Hall of Fame, and in 1942 she was elected as a Fellow of the American Society of Landscape Architects.

In 1934, Flanders designed the gardens for America's Little House, a two-story suburban type home designed by architect Roger Bullard for the Better Homes in America movement, to be situated in New York City on Park Avenue and 39th Street, amongst all the skyscrapers.

Flanders died at her home in Milwaukee on June 7, 1946. She was buried in Forest Home Cemetery.

== Major works ==
- Estate gardens for Sigmund Lehmann and his sons, Tarrytown NY
- Phipps Estate, Denver CO
- Morven Farm Gardens, Charlottesville VA
- McCann Estate French Gardens, Oyster Bay NY
