= Banfi Vintners =

American wine producer and importer

Banfi Vintners is an American company engaged in the production and distribution of wine. Founded by John F. Mariani Sr. in the Little Italy neighborhood of New York City, New York, in 1919, a year before Prohibition. The company continues to be owned by the Mariani family, with third-generation proprietor, Cristina Mariani-May, as CEO. The company is one of the largest importers of wine in the United States. Known to world connoisseurs mainly thanks to Brunello di Montalcino wines.

== Story ==
The headquarters are located in Old Brookville, at Rynwood on Long Island in New York. John Mariani Sr. named the company after his aunt Teodolinda Banfi, the head of the household of Pope Pius XI. He lived with her for most of his childhood. For the first 13 years, John imported Italian delicacies into the country. Immediately after the lifting of the ban on the sale of alcoholic beverages, Mariani entered into agreements with a number of Italian companies to import wine. A major alcohol expansion into this country began in 1969, when Banfi Vintners began supplying Riunite Lambrusco. For 26 years, this wine was the best-selling of those imported into the United States. Success was further enhanced by large contracts for the supply of Chilean wine. In 2011, the company acquired Pacific Rim Winemakers, which owned vineyards in Washington and Oregon. In addition to “mass” wines, premium wines are also supplied to the American market, for example, Poggio all'Oro Brunello di Montalcino Riserva. The Banfi portfolio also includes leading organic brand, Natura, featuring a successful range of varietal wines.

One of the turning points in the company's history was the purchase of 700 hectares of land in the Montalcino region in the 1970s. Two years after the purchase, the wine in this region received the DOCG category classification - the highest in the table of ranks of Italian winemaking. The company invited a commission of 20 scientists from Bordeaux, Pisa and Milan to study the characteristics of the terroir and determine the optimal grape varieties for planting. At that time, 650 clones of Sangiovese were registered in the world. In the first stage, the number was reduced to 150. For 20 years, the team studied them on 29 types of soil of the farm. 15 optimal clones were selected, each of which is necessary for certain purposes. Today, 45 clones of this grape variety are registered in all of Italy, a third of which belong to Banfi Vintners.

In the twenty-first century, the Montalcino vineyards, located near the Banfi Castle, are the company's main production asset. They have been awarded the "Vineyard of the Year in Italy" award thirteen times. The castle grounds include a hotel. The company also owns two vineyards in Piedmont.

== Company activities ==
More than 17 million bottles of wine are produced annually, which are sold in 86 countries. Two-thirds of the company's profits come from sales of the drink in America. In 2014, it employed 500 people, of whom 150 were based in the United States.

The company used non-standard methods of production and distribution in winemaking. For example, for standard wine lines, lightweight bottles are used, which save 6,500 tons of material in the production of each million containers. Thanks to a specially developed irrigation system, the company's vineyards consume 80% less water than other farms. Active selective work is carried out in the company's laboratories. There is a proprietary patented garter system. Also, the Banfi vineyards have one of the highest indices of the ratio of grape plantings to forest plantings.
