= Clifford C. Wendehack =

American architect

Clifford Charles Wendehack
- Born: c. 1886
- Died: May 15, 1948 (aged 62); New York City, U.S.
- Occupation: Architect
- Spouse: Daisybelle Frances Rinck (m. 1911)

Clifford Charles Wendehack was an American architect noted for the design of clubhouses at country clubs during the early part of the twentieth century.

== Early life ==
Wendehack did not receive a professional degree in architecture; he instead received his training through an apprenticeship with architect Donn Barber beginning at the age of seventeen.

In 1911, he married Daisybelle Frances Rinck. After the wedding, the couple spent nine months in Europe. They learned about the sinking of the Titanic while they were sailing home from Naples. While overseas, he designed a house in Montclair, New Jersey that they were to live in after it was completed. His residence in Montclair was located at 124 Gordonhurst Avenue.

== Career ==
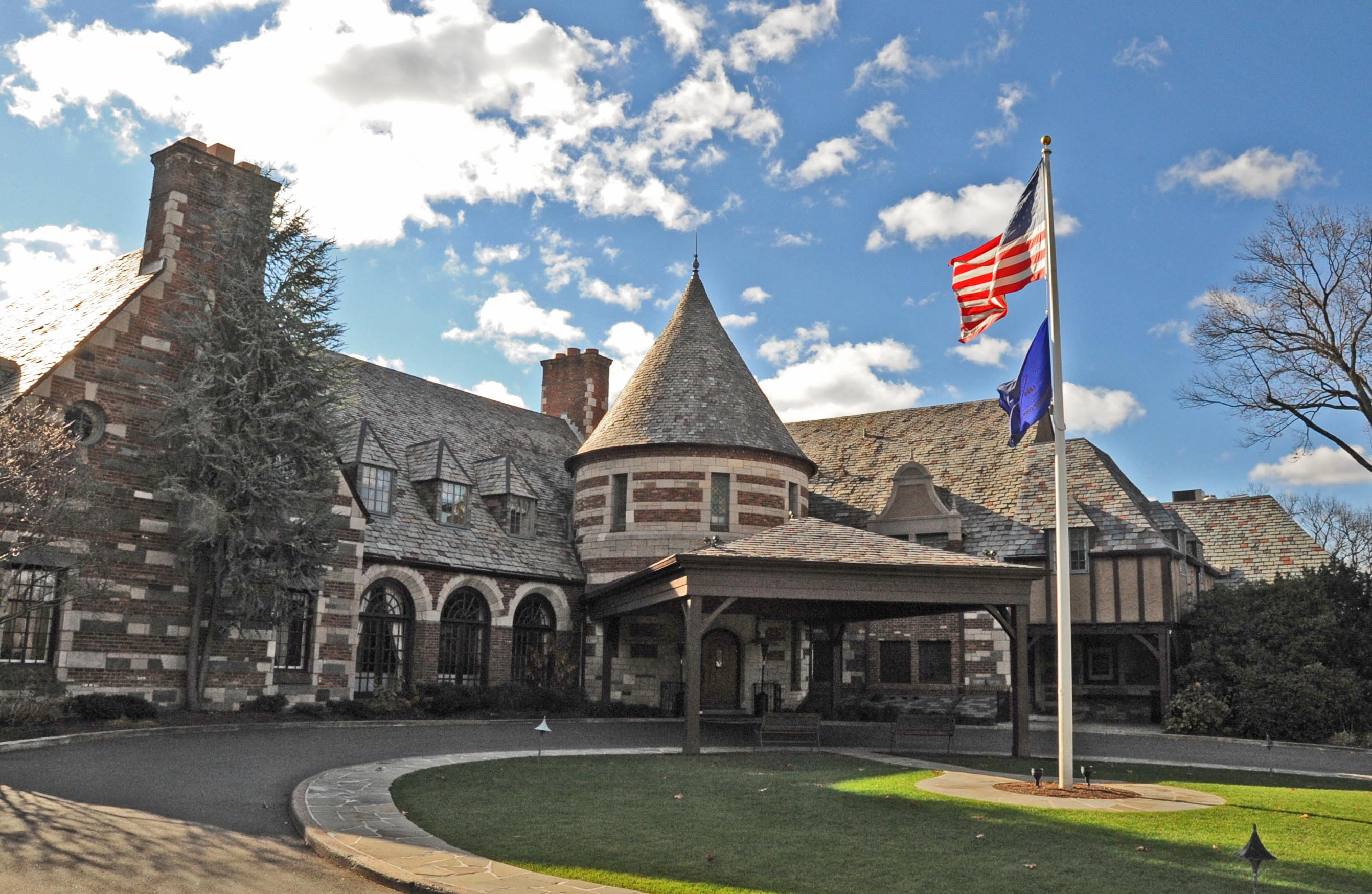
The clubhouse at Ridgewood Country Club in Paramus, NJ

Wendehack was most active during the 1920s. He designed the clubhouse at Winged Foot, opting to use stone to, in his words, "convey the spirit of the organization it is designed to house." He also designed the clubhouses at a number of other golf courses in the 1920s and 1930s; his other works included:

- Bethpage State Park - Farmingdale, New York
- Caracas Country Club - Caracas, Venezuela
- Douglaston Park Golf Course (formerly North Hills Country Club) - Queens, New York
- Forsgate Country Club - Monroe, New Jersey
- Hackensack Golf Club - Oradell, New Jersey
- North Jersey Country Club - Wayne, New Jersey
- Norwood Country Club - West Long Branch, New Jersey
- The Park Country Club - Williamsville, New York
- Ridgewood Country Club - Paramus, New Jersey
- The Pennhills Club - Bradford, Pennsylvania
- Trenton Country Club - Trenton, New Jersey
- Rock Springs Country Club - West Orange, New Jersey
- Yountakah Country Club - Nutley, New Jersey

Wendehack's influence in the design of clubhouses was enhanced by his publications. He was a key contributor to the March 1925 edition of Architectural Forum magazine, the Golf and Country Club Reference Number. This extensive review of the planning and design of clubhouses included an article by Wendehack "Developing the Country Club Plan" which gives a strong insight into his planning and design philosophy. The issue is illustrated with extensive examples of clubhouse architecture and interior design, including a number of Wendehack's projects.

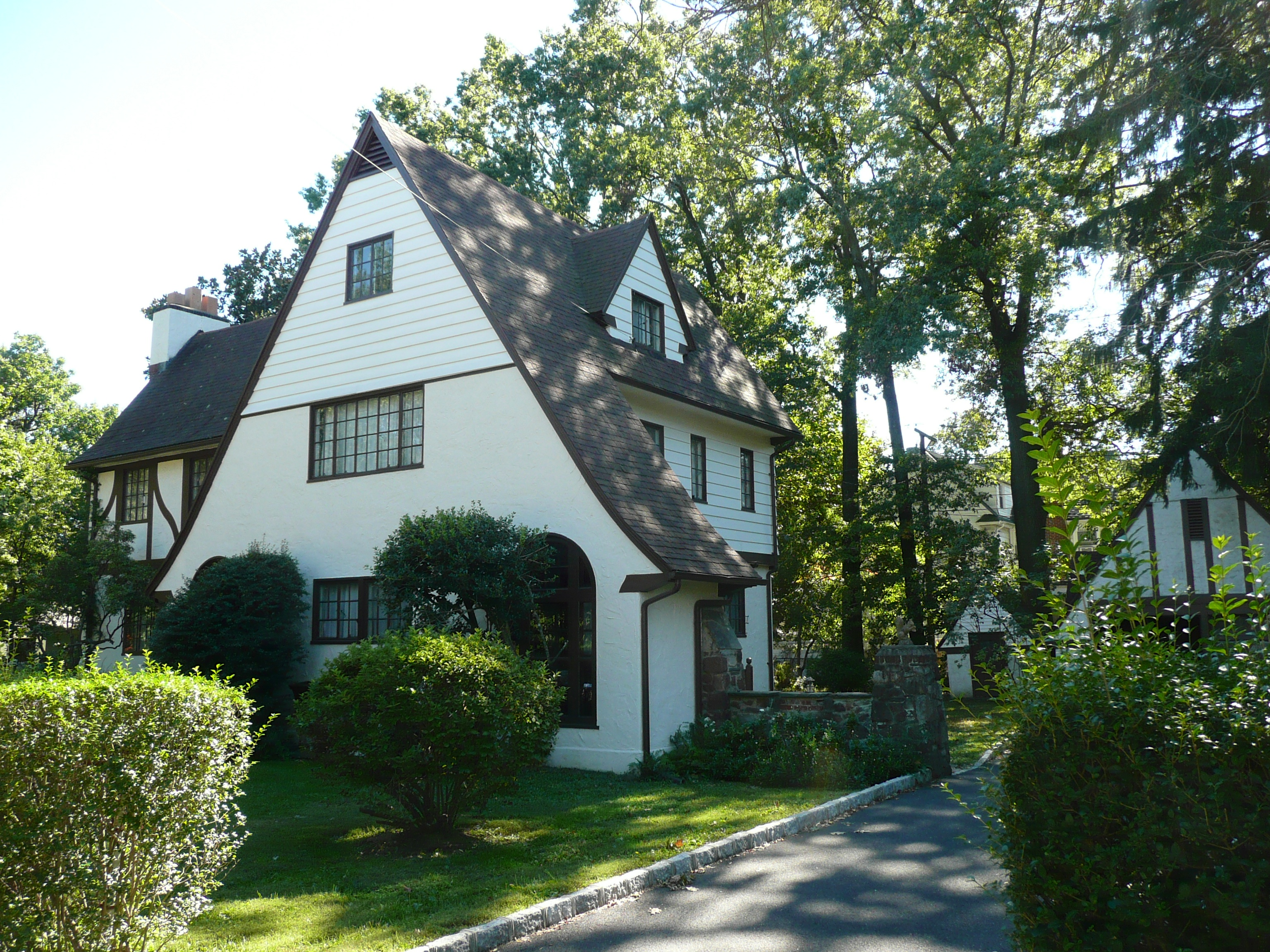
83 Watchung Avenue in Montclair, NJ, also known as "The House that Lives"

Wendehack expanded on this in his 1929 work Golf and Country Clubs, a detailed hardcover publication illustrated with 55 clubhouse designs. This was the most comprehensive work on clubhouses until Richard Diedrich's 2008 The 19th Hole: Architecture of the Golf Clubhouse, a work which extensively references Wendehack's writings. This was followed up in March 1930 with an important contribution to another Architectural Forum Reference Number on Clubhouses, "The Architect and the Building Committee".

He designed three houses in his hometown of Montclair that are listed on the National Register of Historic Places: 21 Stonebridge Road, 7 South Mountain Terrace, and 83 Watchung Avenue (The House that Lives). Wendehack also designed the Fleetwood Hills Apartments in Bronxville, New York.

Along with architect Roger H. Bullard, Wendehack designed the model home known as "America's Little House" that opened in 1934 at the northeast corner of Park Avenue and East 39th Street in Manhattan. Wendehack had previously assisted Donn Barber with building the first demonstration home for National Better Homes in Washington, D.C., which opened in 1923

== Death ==
He died on May 15, 1948 at his office in New York City at the age of 62.
