= America's Little House =

Former demonstration home in Manhattan, New York

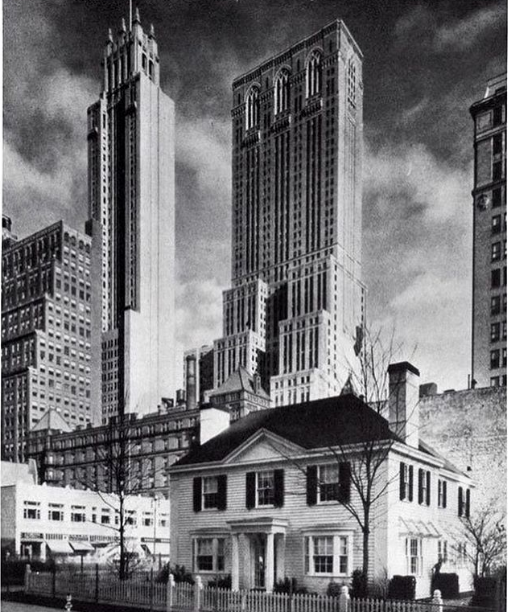
- View from the southeast, with the Lincoln Building and Lefcourt Colonial Building skyscrapers in the background
- Interactive map of the America's Little House area

General information
- Type: House
- Architectural style: Georgian Revival
- Location: Park Avenue and East 39th Street, Manhattan, New York, U.S.
- Coordinates: 40°45′01″N 73°58′43″W
- Groundbreaking: July 30, 1934
- Opened: November 6, 1934
- Closed: November 3, 1935
- Demolished: November 12, 1935
- Cost: $8,000
- Owner: New York Committee of Better Homes in America

Technical details
- Floor count: 2

Design and construction
- Architects: Roger Bullard, Clifford C. Wendehack
- Other designers: Annette Hoyt Flanders, Lillian Moller Gilbreth, Elizabeth Parker, Emily Post

Other information
- Number of rooms: 8

America's Little House was a temporary demonstration home located in Murray Hill, Manhattan in New York which was only open for a year from 1934 to 1935. It was designed by architect Roger Bullard with the assistance of architect Clifford C. Wendehack. The home was built in 1934 as part of the Better Homes in America campaign to promote single-family homeownership, modernization, and improvement. The house's garage included a radio broadcasting studio used by Columbia Broadcasting System (CBS).

The home was a Georgian colonial revival, eight-room house with a garage, surrounded by a lawn and white picket fence. The house was designed to be affordable to the average American family. The house was closed in 1935 after receiving 166,000 visitors; an office building was built on the site in 1954.

== Background ==
=== Better Homes in America movement ===
Between 1922 and 1935, the Better Homes in America movement partnered with the federal government to build demonstration houses in cities across the country. A major objective of the model home was to demonstrate the benefits of standardized and scientifically managed households. "America's Little House" was a highly visible exhibition that showcased new and improved methods of house design, home improvement and housework based on the principles of scientific management by Frederick W. Taylor, the "Father of Modern Management Science".

Better Homes in America was started in 1922 as an educational, non-commercial project to encourage home-ownership, innovation, and modernization in America. It was initiated by President Warren G. Harding and then Secretary of Commerce Herbert Hoover. Over 9,000 communities participated in the project, although these did not include New York City until 1934. Marie Mattingly Meloney, chairman of the New York Committee of Better Homes in America, and co-founder of the national movement, wanted to construct the house in New York as she believed "the importance of a metropolitan demonstration of high standards of architecture and construction and of carefully budgeted furnishings and landscape planning". Meloney was instrumental in having the home built on the vacant lot.

=== Site ===
The house was located on the northeast corner of Park Avenue and East 39th Street, nearby the headquarters for the New York Committee of Better Homes in America, located at 101 Park Avenue. It was part of a vacant parcel of land located three blocks south of Grand Central Terminal which had three failed redevelopment attempts during the prior six years. Overall, the property had a frontage of 123.6 feet (37.7 m) on Park Avenue and 155 feet (47 m) on East 39th Street. It formerly consisted of ten brownstones (Nos. 81 to 91 Park Avenue and Nos. 101 to 107 East 39th Street).

The properties on Park Avenue were sold at auction on foreclosure on July 24, 1934. Plans to construct a model home for exhibition purposes on a portion of the site had been filed on July 19, 1934. The million-dollar plot of land was donated for one year by the Bowery Savings Bank; proceeds of the ten cent admission fee charged to visitors were used towards the taxes on the property. The New York City Parks Department provided landscaping for the adjacent portion of the vacant site along East 39th Street.

== Construction and opening ==
On July 30, 1934, New York City mayor Fiorello La Guardia broke ground on the Park Avenue site. Eleanor Roosevelt, Meloney's close friend, laid down the black, marble hearthstone, on September 25, 1934. On the same day, Roosevelt and Maloney spoke over a national radio broadcast regarding the opening of the demonstration house. The house was opened to the public on November 6, 1934.

== Experts ==
The federal government assembled a team of experts, including architecture, interior design, gardening, and efficiency to develop universal plans which could be used to improve any house. The home was designed by architects Roger Bullard and Clifford C. Wendehack in the simple, practical Georgian architecture style. Elizabeth Parker, with the assistance of Emily Post, selected, budgeted, and arranged the furnishings. Dr. Lillian Moller Gilbreth organized the energy-saving kitchen, along with the nursery and the "clothery" (a new combination of a laundry and sewing room). Annette Hoyt Flanders designed the garden, working in conjunction with J. W. Johnston, the General Chairman of the Garden Committee.

=== Architectural ===
The experts were carefully chosen for their excellence in their fields after much vetting. The architects who designed the house, Roger Bullard and Clifford Wendehack, were chosen due to their previous experience and success with the Better Homes in America program. Bullard had won the 1933 Better Homes in America small house competition for his design of a cottage in Glen Head, New York for Samuel Agar Salvage. Wendehack, along with Donn Barber, had built the first demonstration home for National Better Homes in Washington, D.C., in 1923. They designed the house so it could be built at a cost of $8,000 in most parts of the eastern United States (outside of metropolitan areas); it could be built at a reduced cost in other parts of the country that had lower expenses for labor and materials. The house was designed in the typical Georgian architectural style with a Georgian Colonial Revival exterior (for its neutral design).

Under the initial design, building the house was to cost $12,000. By modifying various features, Bullard reduced this to $8,000. He removed the brick facade (saving $1,190+); reduced the cellar size (saving $150+); replaced the shale roof with a shingle roof (saving $295+); used an open terrace for the kitchen (saving $70+); and used sliding trays in the closets (saving $40+), as well as a few other cost-cutting modifications, which totaled about $3,000. Saving another $1,000, he reduced the total area of the house by removing a hallway and making some rooms smaller. The total size was reduced from 39,361 to 30,376 cubic feet (1,114.6 to 860.2 m^{3}); the depth was cut from 61 to 51 feet (19 to 16 m), and the width was cut from 38 to 35 feet (12 to 11 m).

=== Efficiency and housekeeping ===
Lillian Gilbreth was a pioneer in the scientific management of the household, being a leading expert in using the space in the home in the most efficient manner. She designed three rooms in America's Little House: the kitchen, the nursery, and the clothery. Marie Meloney, as the director of the New York Herald Tribune Institute, the homemaking research branch of the Herald Tribune newspaper, previously worked with Lillian Gilbreth when Gilbreth worked on a larger kitchen model for the Institute, after her book, "Kitchen Practical" was featured in the newspaper. Meloney then hired Gilbreth to design a ten-by-twelve-foot (3.0 by 3.7 m) kitchen, a kitchen laboratory, and two tiny kitchens. Although Meloney failed to hire Gilbreth to a high position at Better Homes in America, in 1933, she was able to convince Gilbreth to work on America's Little House. Gilbreth utilized the same kitchen design for "America's Little House", calling it "America's Little Kitchen".

Gilbreth was well-acquainted with Frederick Winslow Taylor's "scientific management" ideals as her husband had worked for Taylor as an efficiency consultant and had become a leading proponent of the system himself. Gilbreth designed the kitchen with efficiency in mind. For instance, she included rounded work spaces and countertops at a height standardized to the distance from the ground to the housewife's elbow.

=== Landscaping and gardening ===
Annette Hoyt Flanders, the landscape architect for the project, with the assistance of Robert Moses and the American Association of Nurserymen, organized a garden design that took into account the expense and practicality for the average homeowner, which promoted a minimal cost for both the execution of the garden and its later upkeep. She offered a five-year budget for the garden for anyone who wanted to build their own garden. The garden was a 2-foot-thick (0.61 m) layer of topsoil within the fenced-in yard.

Flanders also included a play yard, drying yard, lawn and bird bath at the rear of the house. Four apple trees, transported from New Jersey, were planted in the garden.

=== Interior design ===
Elizabeth Parker, the project's interior designer, helped to show how Americans could best utilize the space inside their homes. Parker worked with Emily Post, who was known for her work in etiquette and interior design. They demonstrated how limited space could be best used at minimal cost to the homeowner, using designs and colors to create the impression of a larger space. To that effect, they incorporated large bay windows with full curtains, white walls, and gray carpets in the design.

== Marketing ==
=== Broadcasting and sponsorship ===
Columbia Broadcasting System (CBS) contributed $50,000 to the project, which included constructing a broadcasting studio in the house's garage. William S. Paley, the president of CBS, was one of the sponsors of the Better Homes campaign. Speaking about the house, Paley was quoted saying,

The renaissance of the home about which so much is heard today, and for which America's Little House stands so graphically as a symbol, suggests not only finer architectural designing, better construction methods and more enduring materials; it goes further than that. It implies healthier, happier and more secure lives within these homes, in which radio, through the Columbia Network hopes to play an increasingly significant part.

The studio was used to broadcast three national radio programs each week related to the Better Homes in America campaign and home improvement with advertising from manufacturers whose products were included in the construction or furnishing of the home. A corridor adjacent to the studio served as an observation gallery and allowed visitors to view broadcasts.

The "America's Little House" radio program was broadcast to 100 stations across the country and the majority of Americans became familiar with the house through the radio program. The first broadcast on October 22, 1934 included author Pearl Buck as a guest speaker. Buck said,

Here is this Little House, to show us, the average Americans, what can be done with the moderate means we possess. There is room in the house for all the life of the family. Drudgery is gone from between these walls, although there are not servants in the house. Labor is incredibly lightened, and beauty of living seems made almost inevitable. Above it stand the tall towers of New York, the towers where so much business and pleasure are carried on. But this little house stands unperturbed and unfrightened.

A broadcast in June 1935 included awarding the gold medal of an architectural competition to Richard J. Neutra; the winning designs of the competition sponsored by Better Homes in America and Architectural Forum were placed on display in the home's studio. The final radio broadcast took place on November 4, 1935, during which guest speaker Marie Meloney discussed how the Better Homes movement had become part of a research project at Purdue University's Housing Research Foundation, which took over Better Homes in America's holdings after it was dissolved in 1935.

=== Photography ===
Richard Averill Smith was hired to photograph the house. He took pictures from a low angle to emphasize the juxtaposition with the surrounding skyscrapers. His photographs were included in contemporary magazines and newspapers, as well as the pamphlet that was provided to visitors of the house.

=== Visitors ===
Over 42,000 people visited the house in its first month alone. Early visitors included Lou Henry Hoover and Grace Coolidge, the wives of presidents Herbert Hoover and Calvin Coolidge, respectively. Herbert Hoover visited America's Little House in February 1935. Before the start of his tour, he said, "I am looking for something imperfect, I wouldn't like to live in a house where everything was just right." He was particularly interested in the children's room and when seeing its closet he commented, "There is no excuse for little boys to throw their clothes on the floor when they have hooks like that, but they wouldn't be boys if they didn't." Better Homes in America had become part of the federal government in 1924, falling under the Department of Commerce, while Hoover served as Secretary of Commerce under President Coolidge. The house received its 100,000th visitor in March 1935, and the guest was presented with a bouquet of roses and greeted by former New York governor Alfred E. Smith.

== Closure and redevelopment ==
In October 1935, it was announced that the house would close the next month. The house closed on November 3, 1935. A total of 166,000 people visited the demonstration home during the twelve-month period when it was open to the public. Demolition of the site began on November 12, 1935. The doors of the house and many of the interior furnishings were sold to hostesses that had worked at the house and had been recently married or would be married soon or to members of the New York Committee of Better Homes in America.

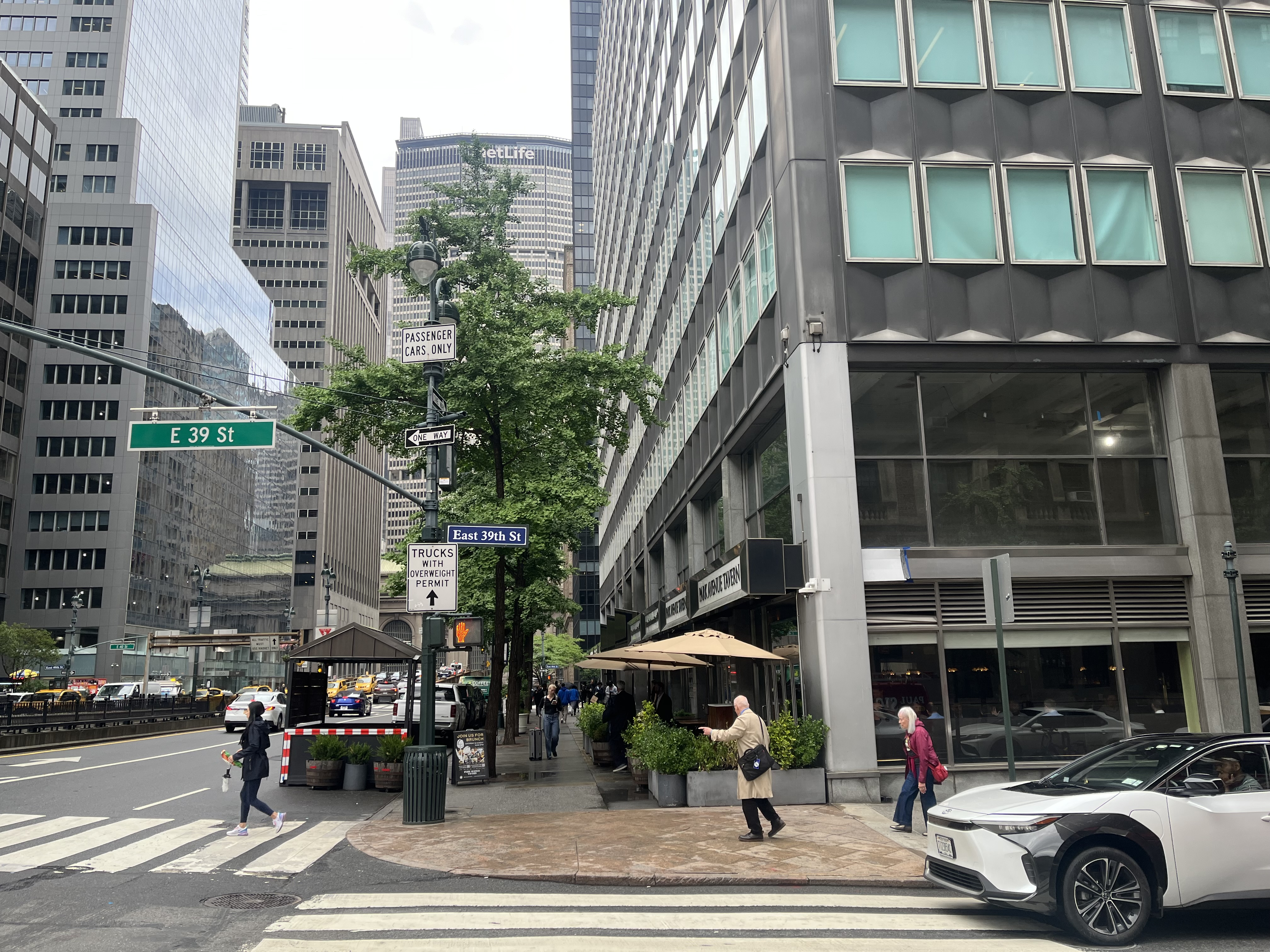
The northeast corner of Park Avenue and East 39th Street, May 2025

After America's Little House was demolished, it was replaced by another temporary exhibition home called "The House of the Modern Age", which was designed by William Van Alen (the architect of the Chrysler Building) and built with prefabricated steel panel walls. The model house designed by Van Alen was later purchased and reassembled in Gloucester, Virginia; a copy was built as a private dwelling in Sea Gate, Brooklyn.

The site was then acquired by the city and plans were filed in 1938 to construct a seven-story courthouse that would be a replacement for the Appellate Division Courthouse of New York State located on Madison Avenue and East 25th Street; the plans were abandoned when the existing courthouse was renovated and expanded. In the interim, the property was leased by Rip's Tennis Courts, which contained three courts, was operated by Robert "Rip" Dolman, and once offered clinics given by Bill Tilden. The property was sold by the city in 1950 at an auction to a syndicate that planned to construct an office building on the site. The former site of America's Little House is now occupied by the 26-story National Distillers Building, which was designed by Emery Roth & Sons and completed in 1954; the current building at 99 Park Avenue spans the entire blockfront on the east side of Park Avenue between East 39th and 40th streets.

== Reproductions ==
The plans were sold to homeowners wanting to build their own version of America's Little House. In 1934, homeowners could purchase the complete set of working drawings, blueprints, and specifications for $35; they could pay $30 if they wanted only the plans and working drawings. The plans were similar to America's Little House except for the following: a one-car garage replaced the broadcasting studio; a duffle room or den replaced the broadcasting studio's control room; the smaller of the two closets in the main bedroom was made deeper; several rooms called for finished oak floors rather than linoleum; and the heating system could be substituted (with the provision for a boiler flue in the chimney). A total of 16 sets of plans were sold to individuals interested in constructing their own copy of the model home. At the time of its closure, one copy of America's Little House had been completed upstate in Cobleskill and others were under construction in Troy, New York and in Baltimore.

As of 2021, a replica of America's Little House located in Fairfield, Connecticut, was listed for sale; modifications made to the 3,114-square-foot (289.3 m^{2}) home included the addition of a chef's kitchen with an adjoining family room; replacing the one-car garage with a two-car garage; and replacing the clothery with a laundry room.
