= Queensborough Community College =

Public college in Bayside, New York, U.S.

Coordinates: 40°45′20″N 73°45′24″W

- Type: Public community college
- Established: 1959
- Parent institution: City University of New York
- President: Christine Mangino
- Academic staff: 775
- Undergraduates: 12,405
- Location: New York City, New York, United States
- Campus: 37 acres (15 ha); Suburban
- Colors: Orange Midnight Blue
- Mascot: Tiger
- Website: www.qcc.cuny.edu

Queensborough Community College (QCC) is a public community college in New York City. One of seven community colleges within the City University of New York (CUNY) system, Queensborough enrolls more than 12,000 attending students and more than 775 instructional faculty.

Queensborough opened in 1959 as a campus of the State University of New York and in 1965 transferred to CUNY. The college offers more than 50 associate degree programs as well as certificate and continuing education programs. Queensborough is accredited by the Middle States Commission on Higher Education.

== Campus ==
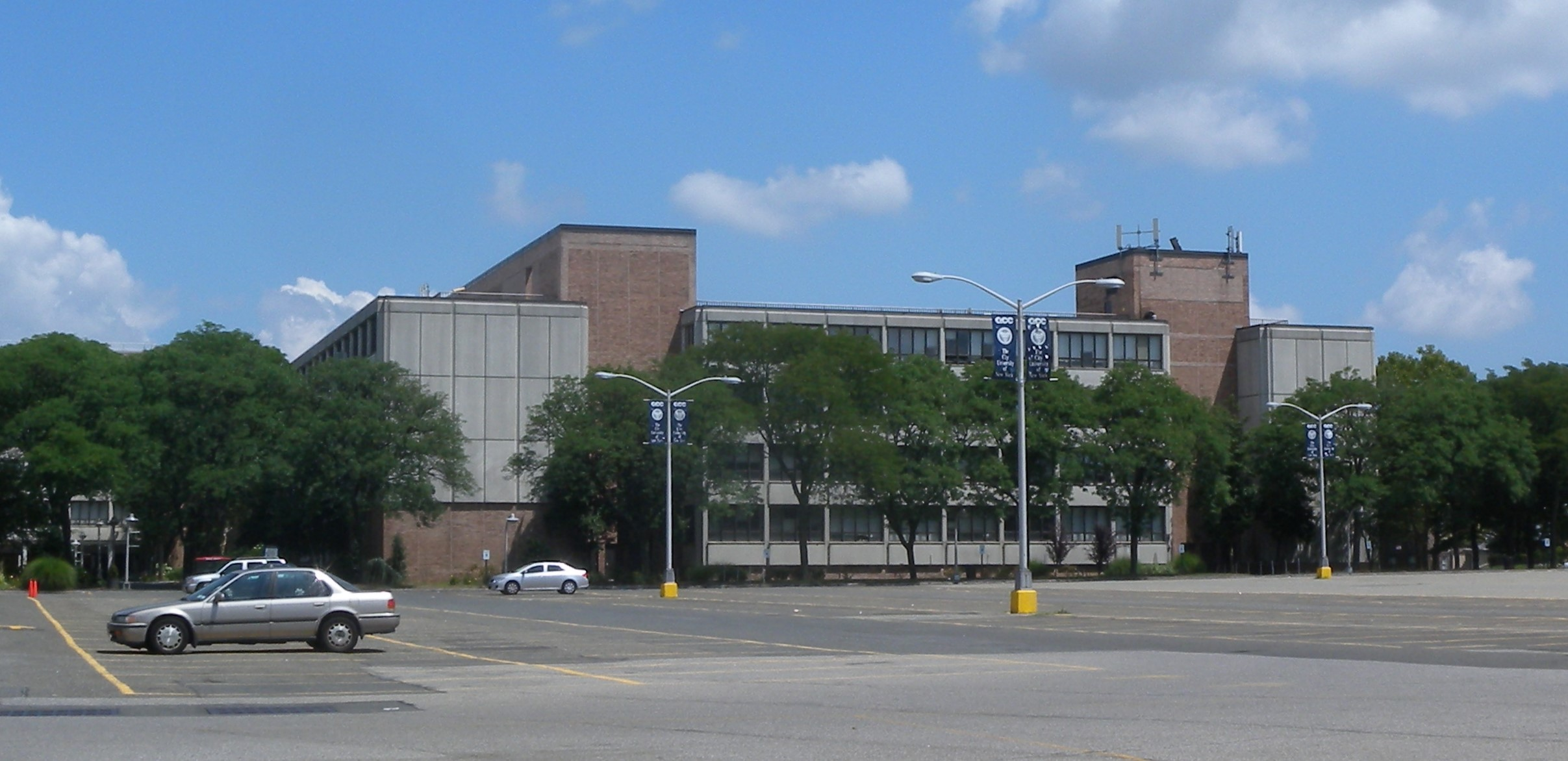

The 37-acre campus was constructed on the site of the former Oakland Golf Club. It comprises ten major buildings used for instruction and extracurricular activities. Among them are the Kupferberg Holocaust Resource Center and Archives, Queensborough Performing Arts Center, the QCC Art Gallery, and an astronomy observatory.

== Public transit access ==
Queensborough Community College can be accessed in one of three ways:

- 7 train to Flushing-Main Street for the Q27 bus
- E, F, M, or R train to Forest Hills-71st Avenue for the Q74 bus
- E or J/Z train to Sutphin Boulevard-JFK for the Q75 bus

== Academics ==
Queensborough offers the following degrees:

- Associate in Arts (AA)
- Associate in Science (AS)
- Associate in Applied Science (AAS)

Transfer curricula are designed for students who plan to continue their studies at a four-year college or professional school. These curricula are equivalent to the first two years of study at a senior college.

Career curricula combine preparation for a career with a grounding in general education, with many graduates entering jobs in business, health sciences, industry, or government. Although career curricula are not primarily designed to prepare students for transfer to senior institutions, many career graduates decide to continue their studies and earn the baccalaureate

== Student life ==
Undergraduate demographics as of Fall 2026
Race and ethnicity	Total
Hispanic	34%
Asian	25%
Black	22%
White	8%
Other (Note: Other consists of multiracial Americans & those who prefer to not say.)	2%
Economic diversity
Low-income (Note: The percentage of students who received an income-based federal Pell Grant intended for low-income students.)	52%
Affluent (Note: The percentage of students who are a part of the American middle class at the bare minimum.)	48%

=== Student governance ===
The Queensborough Community College student body is led by the Queensborough Student Association (QSA).

=== Student media ===
The campus newspaper Communiqué is published monthly during the fall and spring semesters by the students in Introduction to Journalism. In addition, the literary journal Collective is published annually during the spring semester by the students in Creative Writing Club and the English Department; it features original works created by attending students.

== Cultural institutions ==
- The Kupferberg Holocaust Center houses books, documents (including nearly 400 doctoral dissertations on microfilm), and audio-visual materials for use by students, teachers, scholars and any other interested persons.
- The Queensborough Performing Arts Center (QPAC) was founded in 1963 and seats more than 1,000 people. QPAC underwent an extensive renovation from 2023 to 2024.
- The QCC Art Gallery was founded in 1966 by the first chairman of Queensborough Department of Art and Photography, Priva B. Gross. In 1981, the Art Gallery opened in its present location - historic 1920s Oakland Building, former club house for the Oakland Country Club and the oldest building on campus. The Art Gallery was renovated again in 2004.

== Athletics ==
Queensborough Community College teams participate as a member of the National Junior College Athletic Association (NJCAA). The Tigers are a member of the community college section of the City University of New York Athletic Conference (CUNYAC). Men's sports include baseball, basketball, cross country, soccer, swimming and track & field; women's sports include basketball, cross country, swimming, track & field and volleyball.

== Notable alumni ==
- Joe Santagato, YouTuber and entertainer
- J.Sheon, Taiwanese rapper
