= Louis C. Clark Sanctuary =

Protected area in Old Brookville, New York, United States

Coordinates: 40.821426°N 73.616723°W

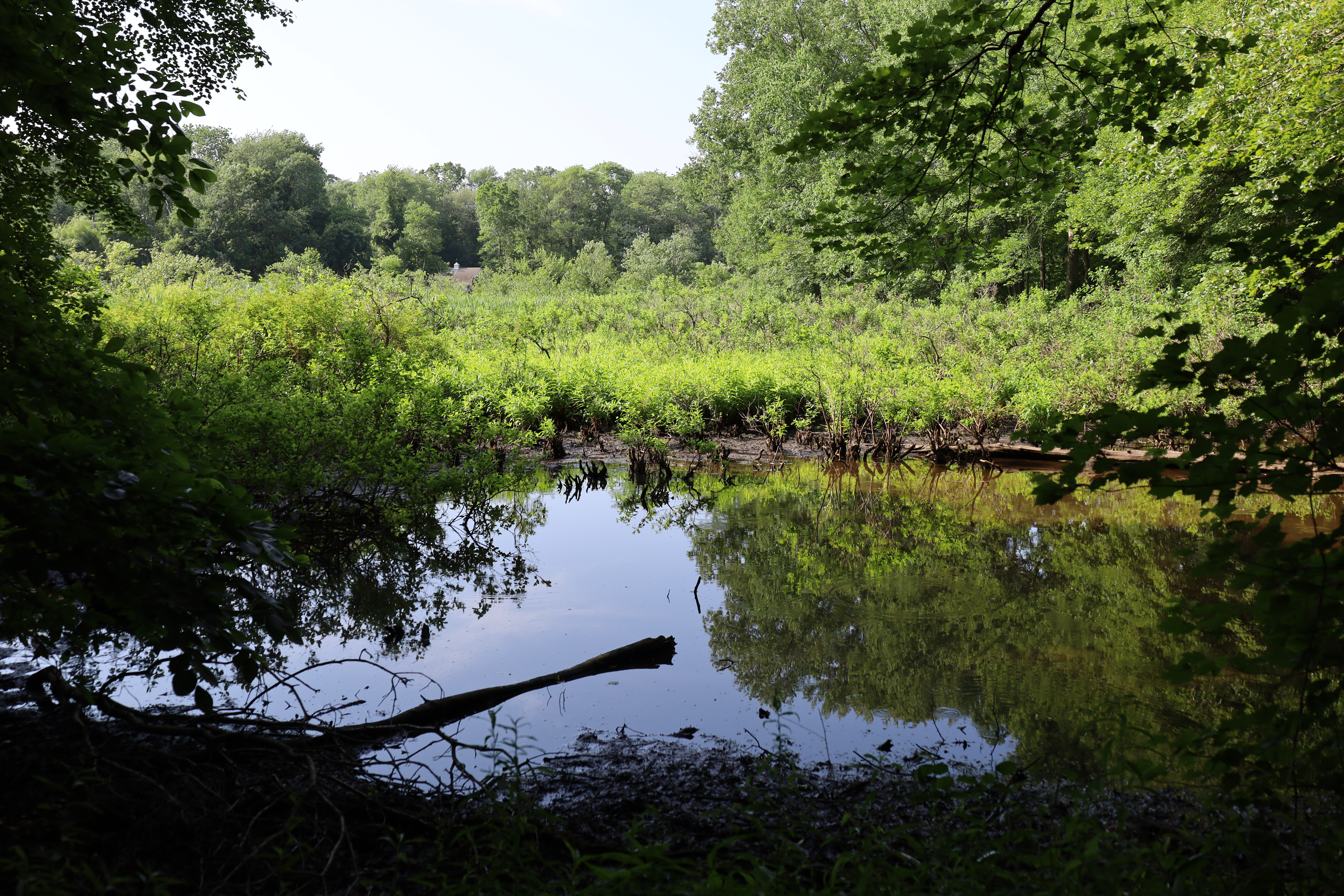
The sanctuary in 2021

The Louis C. Clark Sanctuary is a nature reserve located on Valentine's Road in the Village of Old Brookville in Nassau County, on Long Island, in New York, United States.

== Description ==
The eight-acre (3.2 ha) sanctuary was once a part of Valentine Farm. It was donated by Frances S. Weeks to The Nature Conservancy in 1965 in memory of her son, Louis C. Clark. In 2012, the property was transferred to the North Shore Land Alliance.

The sanctuary protects a freshwater marsh and swamp that is part of the Cedar Swamp Creek watershed. The swamp is characterized by cattail, buttonbush, red maple and tupelo; in addition, over 150 species of wildflowers and 25 species of shrubs and vines are found within the preserve. There is also a range of animals that inhabit the swamp such as snapping turtles, green herons, and wood ducks. A total of 0.75 miles (1.21 km) of trails are maintained on the property, which is open to the public. The James Preserve is located across Valentine's Road from the property.
