= Pacific Rim Winemakers =

- Location: 8111 Keene Rd., West Richland, Washington, United States
- Wine region: Columbia Valley Wineries
- Appellation: Washington Wineries
- Varietals: Riesling
- Website: https://pacificrimandco.com/

Pacific Rim Winemakers is a Washington winery owned by the Mariani Family (who are also owners of Castello Banfi in Tuscany, and of import firm Banfi Vintners, based on Long Island, New York). It was founded by Randall Grahm (also owner of Bonny Doon Vineyard in California) in 1992. Pacific Rim's winery is located in West Richland (Tri Cities area in Eastern Washington) and is the United States' only large winery devoted almost exclusively to Riesling. The wines have been produced since the 2006 vintage by general manager and head winemaker Nicolas Quillé. Pacific Rim produces principally Riesling from Dry to dessert style (eleven Rieslings in total including several single vineyard sites in the Columbia Valley) and also small amounts of Gewurztraminer, Gruner Veltliner, and Chenin blanc.

Pacific Rim's team has written a book about Riesling, Riesling Rules, which is available on their website.

In April 2026, Pacific Rim filed for Chapter 11 bankruptcy protection with intentions to liquidate inventory by summer 2026.
