= American Viscose Corporation =

American textile company

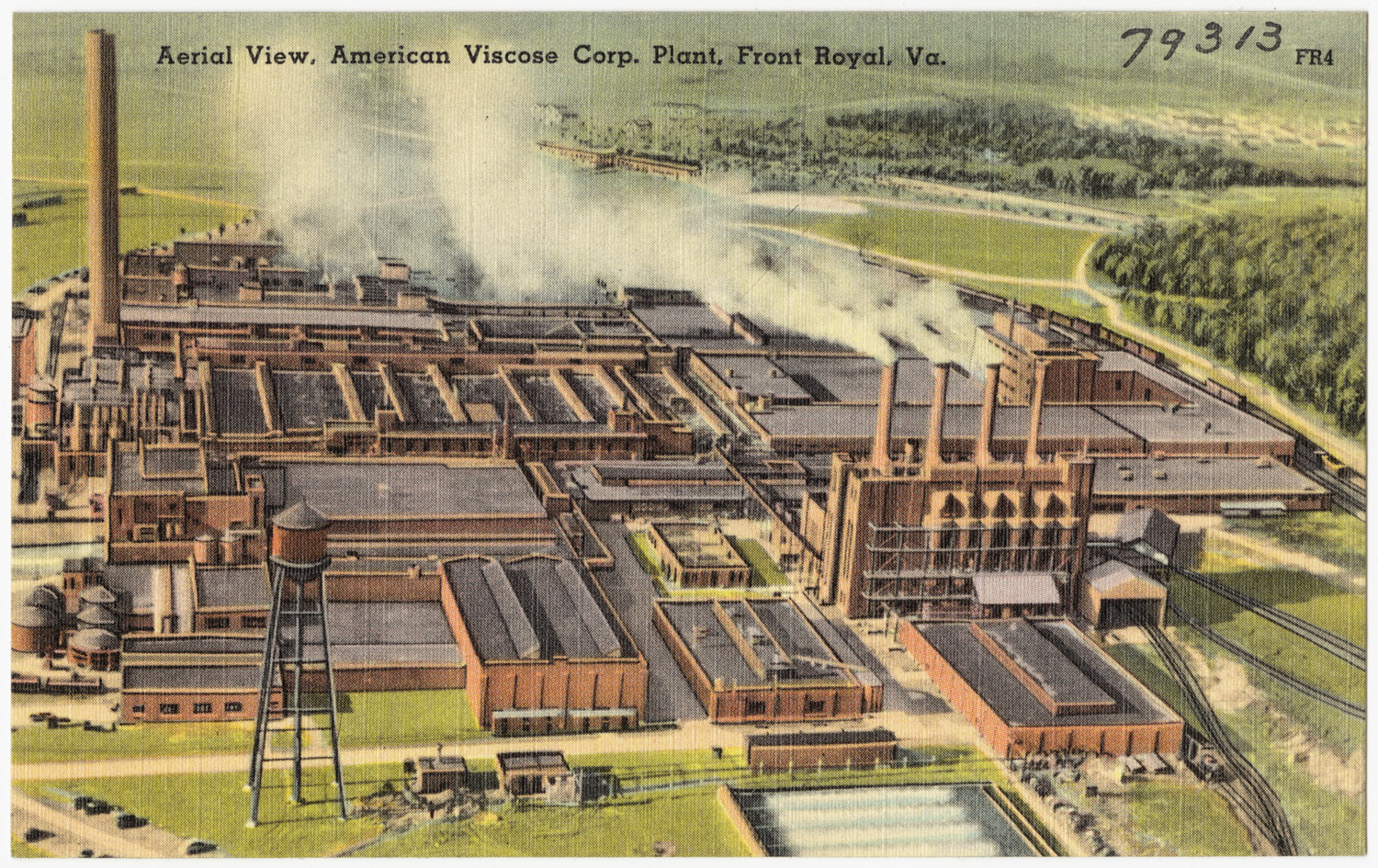
Mid-20th century postcard showing an aerial view of the American Viscose Corporation Plant in Front Royal, Virginia.

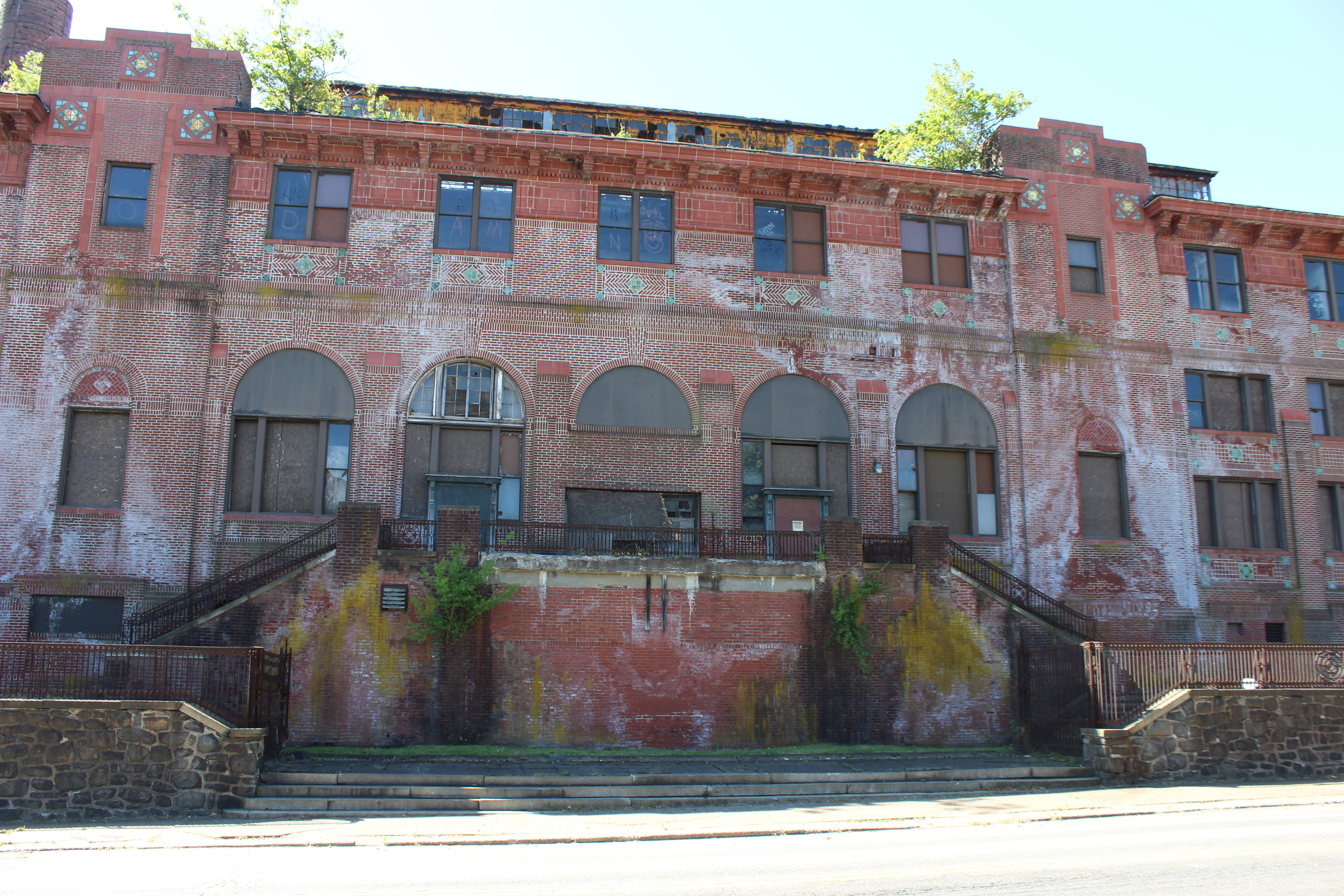
Vacant American Viscose Corporation Building on 10th Street in Marcus Hook in 2020

American Viscose Corporation was an American division of the British firm Courtaulds, which manufactured rayon and other synthetic fibres. Rayon fibre (or viscose) is created from wood pulp that has been exposed to various chemical and physical processes. The main plant building was constructed in 1937, and had four major corridors that were built perpendicular to the four compass points, north, south, east, and west.

The company operated from 1910 to 1976 when it was renamed Avtex. Avtex closed in 1990.

== History ==
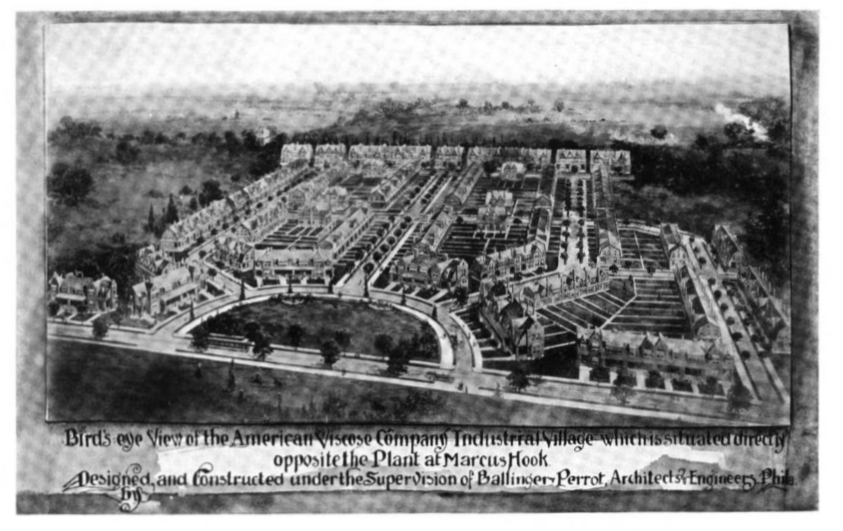
American Viscose Corporation Industrial Village built to house workers in Marcus Hook, Pennsylvania

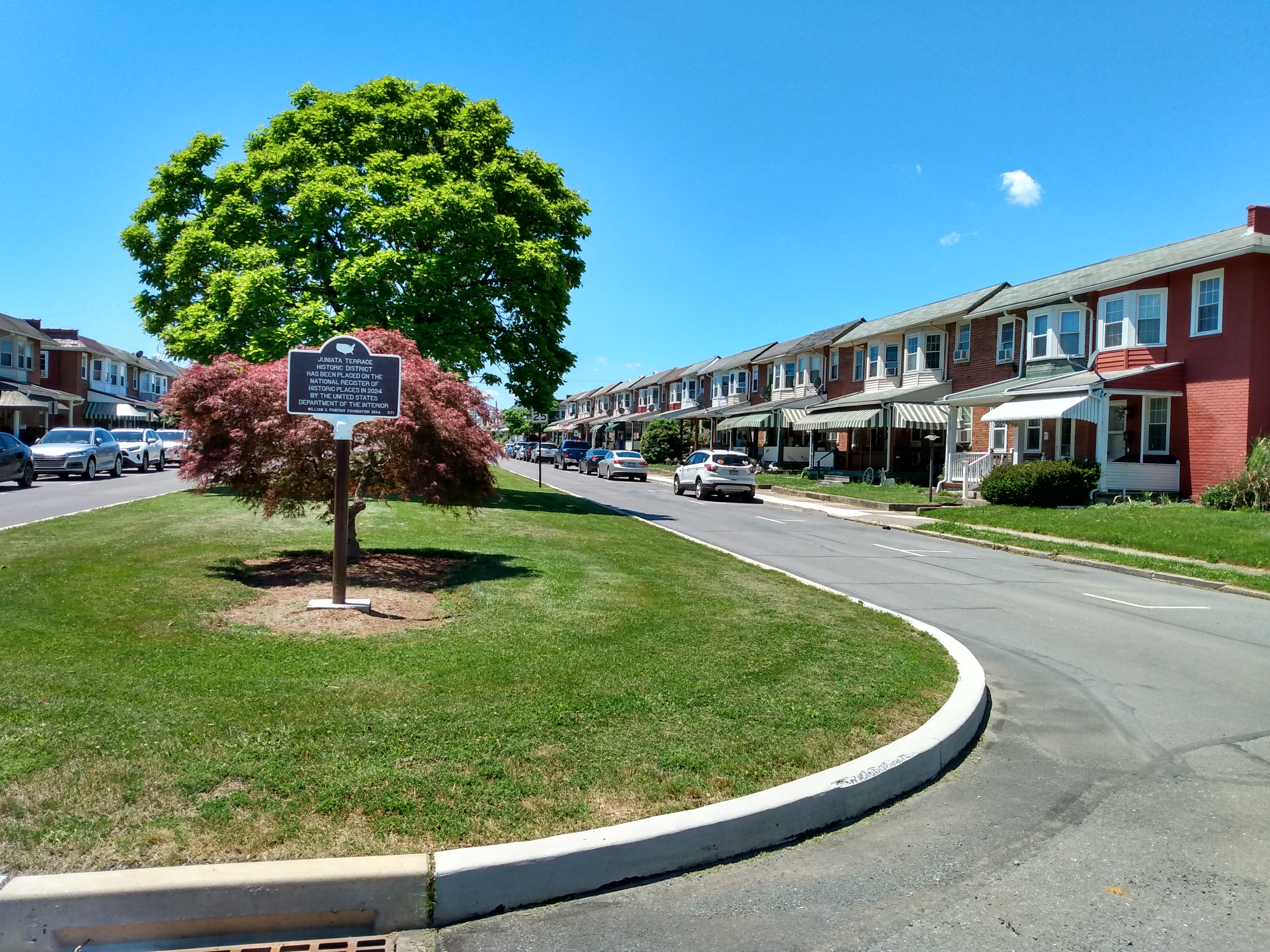
General view of Juniata Terrace Historic District

Established in 1909, American Viscose became the first successful commercial producer of rayon and artificial silk in the United States. For the next decade, American Viscose was the sole producer of rayon in the United States. By the 1920s, the United States was the largest producer of rayon in the world. By 1929, the US output of rayon was more than double that of Italy, the second largest producer. There were half a dozen US rayon companies, but American Viscose produced more than half of the total rayon output in the US.

American Viscose had plants at Marcus Hook, Pennsylvania (established 1910), Roanoke, Virginia (1916), Lewistown, Pennsylvania (1920), Parkersburg, West Virginia (1927), Meadville, Pennsylvania (1929), Nitro, West Virginia, and Front Royal, Virginia (1940). After a 1946 merger with Sylvania Industrial Corporation (not to be confused with lighting and electronics manufacturer Sylvania), it gained a plant at Fredericksburg, Virginia.

The company was founded by Samuel Agar Salvage, as a division of Courtaulds and began production as "The American Viscose Corporation-(AVC)" in 1910. Later it was branded as "Crown Rayon". In 1941, to purchase supplies for the War, the British government were pressured by the U.S. Government to sell the company to 152 American investment firms in a deal led by Morgan, Stanley & Co. and Dillion, Reed & Co. The 228,480 shares were sold to the public. In 1949, the company passed into the control of the Monsanto Corporation. (Courtaulds resumed manufacture of rayon in the United States in 1952, at a new plant in Axis, Alabama). In 1963 it was purchased by FMC Corporation. In 1974 the plant in Parkersburg, West Virginia was closed. FMC sold off the division in 1976 to its employees, when it was renamed Avtex Fibers.

The American Viscose Corporation built at least two residential neighborhoods for their workers, one in Marcus Hook, Pennsylvania and one near Lewistown, Pennsylvania called Juniata Terrace. The latter was placed on the National Register of Historic Places in 2024.

AVC also extended their reach to television station ownership, purchasing majority control of five construction permits from Daniel H. Overmyer in 1967 in exchange for a $3 million loan. AVC formed U.S. Communications, Inc., to operate these unbuilt stations along with WPHL-TV in Philadelphia, which was concurrently purchased from separate interests. Four of the five permits signed on the air, but three of the five left the air in 1971; all were eventually sold by 1972.

In 1980 Avtex Fibers closed their plant in Nitro, West Virginia that manufactured rayon staple. In 1983, Avtex Fibers was the largest US manufacturer of rayon fiber, as well as operating plants that made polyester and acetate yarn.

The company made rayon fiber for fabric and also rayon cord for reinforcement of automobile tires. Declining sales and high internal costs caused Avtex to close its rayon operations in 1988, briefly restarting to produce fiber for the aerospace industry, and then permanently closing in 1990 for economic and environmental reasons.

== Superfund sites ==
Many of its closed plants have become Superfund pollution cleanup sites.

The former plant site at Front Royal, Virginia was used for manufacturing from 1940 until 1989, when the plant was closed after being cited for more than 2,000 environmental violations over five years, including emissions of polychlorinated biphenyls (PCBs) into the nearby Shenandoah River. The plant had an extensive underground sewer system which traversed the property, carrying waste and wastewater from the manufacturing plant to the treatment plant. According to an EPA report from Sep 1990, 'it is anticipated that the structural integrity of the sewer system has been compromised and may be a source of subsurface soil and ground water contamination'. Traces of the contaminant carbon disulfide, which is a component of viscose waste, was identified in samples of residental wells in Rivermont Acres, which is located across the Shenandoah River from the plant.

The plant was demolished in 1997, and is being restored by FMC in conjunction with the United States Environmental Protection Agency.

== See also ==
- American Viscose Plant Historic District
