= Glen Cove Creek =

Glen Cove Creek Cedar Swamp Creek
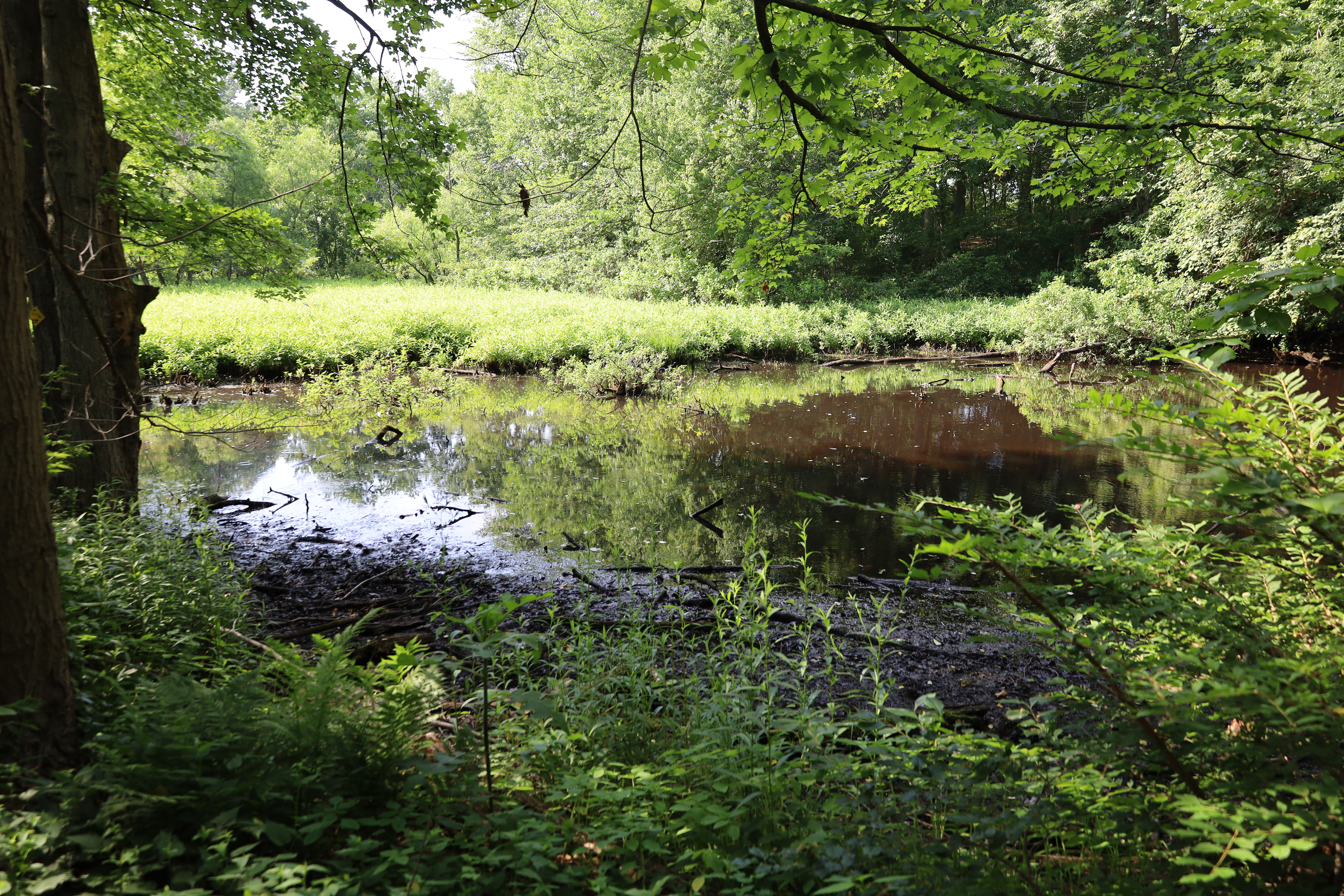
- Wetlands of Louis C. Clark Sanctuary in Old Brookville, through which the creek flow

Location
- Country: United States
- State: New York
- County: Nassau
- Municipality: Glen Cove

Physical characteristics
- Mouth: Hempstead Harbor
  - coordinates: 40°51′21″N 73°38′52″W
- Length: Approximately 1 mile (1.6 km)

Glen Cove Creek is a stream in Glen Cove and the Town of Oyster Bay on Long Island in New York. It its upper reaches are also known as Cedar Swamp Creek. The creek flows into Hempstead Harbor, an arm of Long Island Sound.

== Course ==
The creek begins at a lake on the grounds of the De Seversky Mansion on the New York Institute of Technology campus in Old Westbury. It then flows north under Northern Boulevard (NY 25A) into Old Brookville, where it crosses through residential properties, the Louis C. Clark Sanctuary, and the grounds of Old Brookville Village Hall.

For much of its middle section the creek flows alongside an arterial highway known first as Glen Cove Road and then Cedar Swamp Road (NY 107) as it passes into Glen Head. The creek deviates from the highway to flow through Glen Head Country Club and then an industrial area as it crosses into Glen Cove. The creek then rejoins the arterial highway, at this point called Pratt Boulevard, and then runs through a long culvert underneath downtown Glen Cove.

The creek emerges from the culvert into Mill Pond, the remnant of two large mill ponds that were replaced by the culvert. After crossing under the Charles Street Bridge, the creek is tidal and channelized. The tidal portion of Glen Cove Creek is roughly 1 mile (1.6 km) long, and extends east from Hempstead Harbor and into Glen Cove, with its head of navigation being located at Charles Street, in close proximity to Glen Cove's downtown.

== History ==
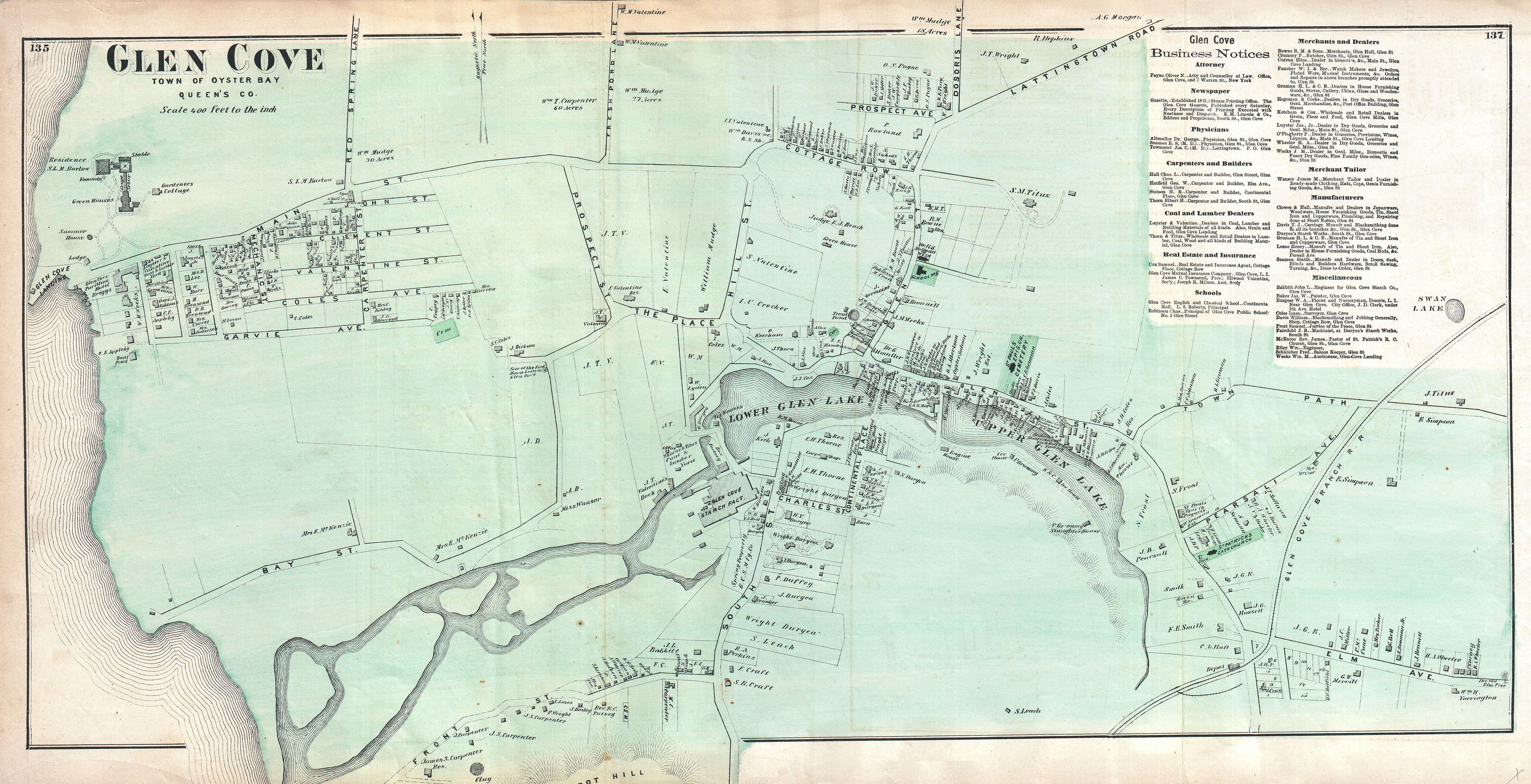
An 1873 map of Glen Cove shows the two mill ponds that historically existed at its downtown

When Glen Cove started to industrialize in the mid-to-late 19th Century, Glen Cove Creek was used by a local starch plant to dispose of waste; the settling of the waste gave the creek a strong odor, which could be smelled from nearby Sea Cliff when the wind blew in that direction.

The creek's waterfront in recent years has been undergoing a redevelopment project, including the construction of condominium buildings and shops.

In 2001, when Glen Cove Creek was being dredged by the U.S. Army Corps of Engineers, radioactive material was discovered in the creek. This caused all dredging operations to stop operating, and the creek was designated as part of the LI Tungsten Superfund Site.

== Transportation ==
Glen Cove's Garvies Point Ferry Terminal is located on the north side Glen Cove Creek, within the Garvies Point section of the City of Glen Cove.

== See also ==
- Geography of Long Island
- Mill River (Hempstead, New York)
