= The Park Country Club =

Country club in Town of Amherst, New York

Coordinates: 42°58′39″N 78°45′08″W

Park Country Club
- Interactive map of Park Country Club

Club information
- Location: Williamsville, NY
- Established: 1903
- Type: Private
- Tota holes: 18
- Tournaments: 1934 PGA Championship
- Website: http://www.parkclub.org
- Designed by: Colt & Alison (Course); Clifford C. Wendehack (Clubhouse)
- Par: 71
- Length: 6,507 yards (5,950 m)
- Course rating: 70.9
- Slope rating: 125

The Park Country Club of Buffalo, Inc. is a country club located in the Town of Amherst, just outside Williamsville, New York, a suburb of Buffalo, United States. The club was founded in 1903 in the City of Buffalo in what is now known as Delaware Park, but which was known simply as The Park at the time. The Park Club hosted the 1934 PGA Championship.

== Facilities ==
Lounges and meeting rooms are available to the members and their guests, in addition to formal, informal, and patio dining and dancing. Other leisure facilities include tennis, volleyball, swimming and diving, and lawn bowling, as well as a golf course designed by Colt & Alison.

== Clubhouse ==
The club moved out of the city to its current location on Ellicott Creek in 1928. The current clubhouse was designed by noted architect Clifford C. Wendehack and was originally decorated by George Hoag of Prentiss & Company. The clubhouse is a built of "brick and stone of many varieties, French fossil and Jeanne d’Arc having been blended with Holland brick," according to contemporary newspaper reports. The clubhouse has since been expanded, including kitchen facilities and lounge and locker rooms, in consistent English Gothic and Tudor style.

== PGA Championship ==
In 1934 the golf course was the venue for the PGA Championship, one of professional golf's four major championships. The tournament was won by Paul Runyan, who defeated Craig Wood in the final at the second extra hole.
