= Oakland Golf Club =

Disbanded country club in Bayside, Queens, New York, USA

- Location within New York Location within New York City
- 40°45′21″N 73°45′28″W

Club information
- Established: September 10, 1896; 129 years ago
- Type: Private
- Total holes: 27
- Designed by: Tom Bendelow (1897); Walter Travis (1905); Seth Raynor (1919)

Oakland Golf Club is a former golf country club in Bayside, New York. The club opened in September 10, 1896, and it was disbanded in 1952. The former site is now the site of the Queensborough Community College. It was the second oldest course in Queens, New York, and it claimed to be the fourth oldest golf course in the United States. The first game was played on September 10, 1896.

Its membership included J.P. Morgan, Nicholas Murray Butler, Alfred E. Smith, H. P. Whitney, and W. K. Vanderbilt.

== Early history ==
The golf club was incorporated on August 13, 1896. Tom Bendelow designed the first nine holes at the golf course. The first game was played on September 10, 1896. The club initially limited the number of memberships available to 200. In order to join, men needed to be at least 17 years old and women 16 years old. Annual dues were $15 for men and $7.50 for women (equivalent to $581 and $290 respectively in 2025).

Walter Travis designed the second nine holes in 1905.

The clubhouse was destroyed in a fire caused by a defective chimney flue in 1917.

The course was redesigned by golf course designer, Seth Raynor, in 1919. Roger Bullard was the architect for the golf course's clubhouse.

== Closure and redevelopment ==
In September 1952, the membership decided to offer it up for sale, as the land had increased substantially in value as eastern Queens had been developed around it.

The former clubhouse of the golf course now serves as Queensboro Community College's Oakland Building and includes an art gallery. Benjamin N. Cardozo High School was also built on the former site of the golf course.
