= American Viscose Plant Historic District =

Historic district in Roanoke, Virginia, US

- U.S. National Register of Historic Places
- U.S. Historic district
- Virginia Landmarks Register
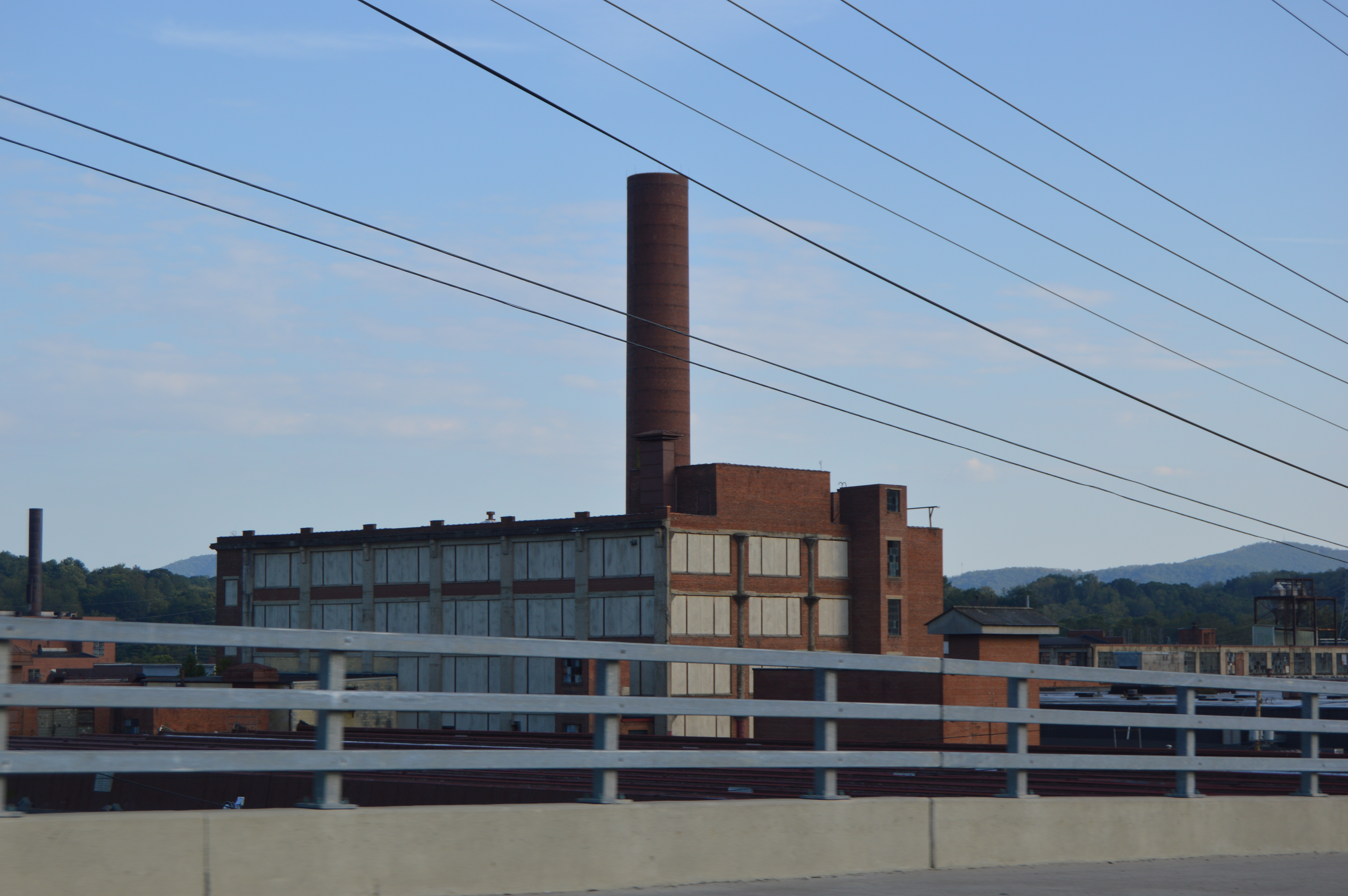
- The American Viscose Plant as viewed from the Ninth Street Bridge

- Location within Virginia Location within the United States
- Location: 9th Street SE, Industry Avenue SE, River Avenue SE, and Progress Drive SE, Roanoke, Virginia
- Coordinates: 37°15′18″N 79°55′19″W
- Area: 65 acres (26 ha)
- Built: 1916–1955
- Architect: The Ballinger Company
- Architectural style: Industrial
- NRHP reference No.: 100004260
- VLR No.: 128-0238

Significant dates
- Added to NRHP: August 6, 2019
- Designated VLR: June 20, 2019

The American Viscose Plant Historic District is an industrial park and historic district located in Roanoke, Virginia. The site is the location of the former American Viscose Corporation rayon processing plant that once employed over 5,000 and for a time was reportedly the largest rayon producing mill in the world. The plant's construction began in 1916 with the building of the first of what became three large processing plants of two spinning units each; the second began construction in 1921 and the third in 1925. With the plant's viability decreased by newer facilities elsewhere and rayon's usage supplanted by nylon and other synthetic fabrics, the factory closed in 1958. The property was purchased by an assortment of Roanoke investors in 1961 and has been operated as an industrial park since.

The district consists of 20 contributing resources, including 16 buildings, two structures, and two sites. It was listed on the National Register of Historic Places in 2019. As of 2023, it was in the early stages of redevelopment into a mixed-use district of residential and commercial use.

== History ==
The American Viscose Company was established in 1909 as the American wing of Courtaulds, a British textile company specializing in silk. The company patented the method of production of viscose (also known as artificial silk, and later, rayon), and built its first United States plant at Marcus Hook, Pennsylvania, in 1910. Demand was such that in 1916, The Viscose Company (as they had been renamed in 1915) decided to begin construction of a second, larger plant. A location was chosen southeast of Roanoke, Virginia, partially due to inducements by city government promising infrastructure improvements specifically for the company's needs. The company purchased 212 acres (86 ha) along the Roanoke River, which provided the large amount of water necessary for the rayon manufacturing process. The Ballinger Company, a Philadelphia-based industrial design firm, was contracted as architects for the project. The plant's first spinning unit opened in 1917 and employed 1,000 workers, mostly women. The company immediately began construction on a second unit under the same roof as the first, which was completed in 1919 and increased the workforce to 1,700. A reservoir, settling basin, and water filter house were constructed around this time as well. That year also saw the first work stoppage at the plant, with employees walking out to earn recognition of a union.

In 1921, the complex expanded again with the construction of two more spinning units inside a second large, one-story building located just east of the first. At its completion the plant employed 3,800 and was producing over 12 million pounds (5.4 kt) of rayon annually, which amounted to 35% of the nation's entire output. A 9,000-kilowatt steam power plant, second filter house, and an expanded settling basin date to this time, as well as a water treatment plant built circa 1923. Buildings for pumping, diluting, and acid regeneration were also constructed in the early 1920s, though likely not by The Ballinger Company (who designed most of the complex but left much of the actual construction to local firms).

Fireproofing concerns required all plant buildings to be constructed of brick, mainly five- and six-course American bond, on a concrete foundation. Additional fire safety measures included a grid of underground pipes feeding 50,000 sprinklers in the plant, as well as a tunnel system by which the company's own fire department could travel between the complex's buildings.

By 1922, over 1,000 women were working at the plant, many of whom had come from surrounding rural areas. In that year The Viscose Company spent $500,000 to build Hillcrest Hall, a four-story women's dormitory capable of housing 200, and equipped with its own lounge, library, cafeteria, gymnasium, and infirmary (the dorm has been razed and is not part of the historic district). The plant itself had its own 24-hour, 2,000-seat capacity cafeteria, as well as an infirmary and athletic fields, and by 1923, a social club with 2,800 members. The company built no other housing for its employees, but by 1925 much of the land in Southeast Roanoke between downtown and the plant had been developed with single family houses. (Note: The company did build residential neighborhoods for its workers in Marcus Hook, Pennsylvania and near Lewistown, Pennsylvania. The latter was named Juniata Terrace, and is on the National Register of Historic Places.) The plant was also the largest employer of residents of Wasena, a neighborhood to the district's west that saw significant growth in the 1920s.

The Viscose Company announced another expansion in 1925, and by May of the following year a fifth spinning unit was operational. In November 1925, as construction of one of the site's 300-foot-tall (91 m) smokestacks was nearing completion, masonry from the top fell and killed two plant employees standing below. An additional water treatment plant was added at this time as well; the two combined could treat 35 million gallons weekly. Only one year later the company broke ground on a sixth and final spinning unit (operational by early 1928) as well as a second power plant. The factory reached its peak employment at this time with 5,500 employees, and the plant was producing 20 million pounds (9.1 kt) of rayon annually, which, combined with the yield of The Viscose Company's two Pennsylvania rayon plants, accounted for over half of the artificial silk produced in America.

The Great Depression began shortly after the sixth unit's completion, and though production at The Viscose Company's U.S. plants fell by 25% in 1930, demand remained relatively steady through the mid-1930s. The textile industry did eventually slump, however, and American Viscose saw its first fiscal loss in 1938. In that year the company laid off 1,200 at the Roanoke plant and reduced the remaining employees' work week to 32 hours. The let go workers were recalled shortly after, though the sixth spinning unit stayed non-operational and the fifth was temporarily shut down in 1939. World War II created a high demand for rayon, however, and the Roanoke plant was soon making fiber for tires, parachutes, uniforms, and other military needs. By the end of 1939, the company had added a four-story sulfuric acid reclamation plant in the complex to accompany a caustic soda reclamation plant built in 1935. The total area of floor space in the sprawling complex would eventually reach over 1.6 million square feet (150,000 m^{2}).

In 1937, the company saw its name changed to the American Viscose Corporation, and in that same year also adopted a 40-hour work week with a 10% increase in wages. A 1939 collective bargaining agreement between American Viscose and the Textile Workers Union of America increased wages an additional 6%. The firm maintained a Roanoke workforce of 4,400 by 1940, second in employment size in the area only to the Norfolk and Western Railway (N&W), with 7,000. In 1940, American Viscose was sold by Courtaulds to a group of U.S. investors, with 90% of the proceeds from the sale going to the English government to help pay for wartime needs. The U.S. Secretary of the Treasury Henry Morgenthau had insisted that the British sell certain United States-based assets in order to offset some of the costs of the Lend-Lease program.

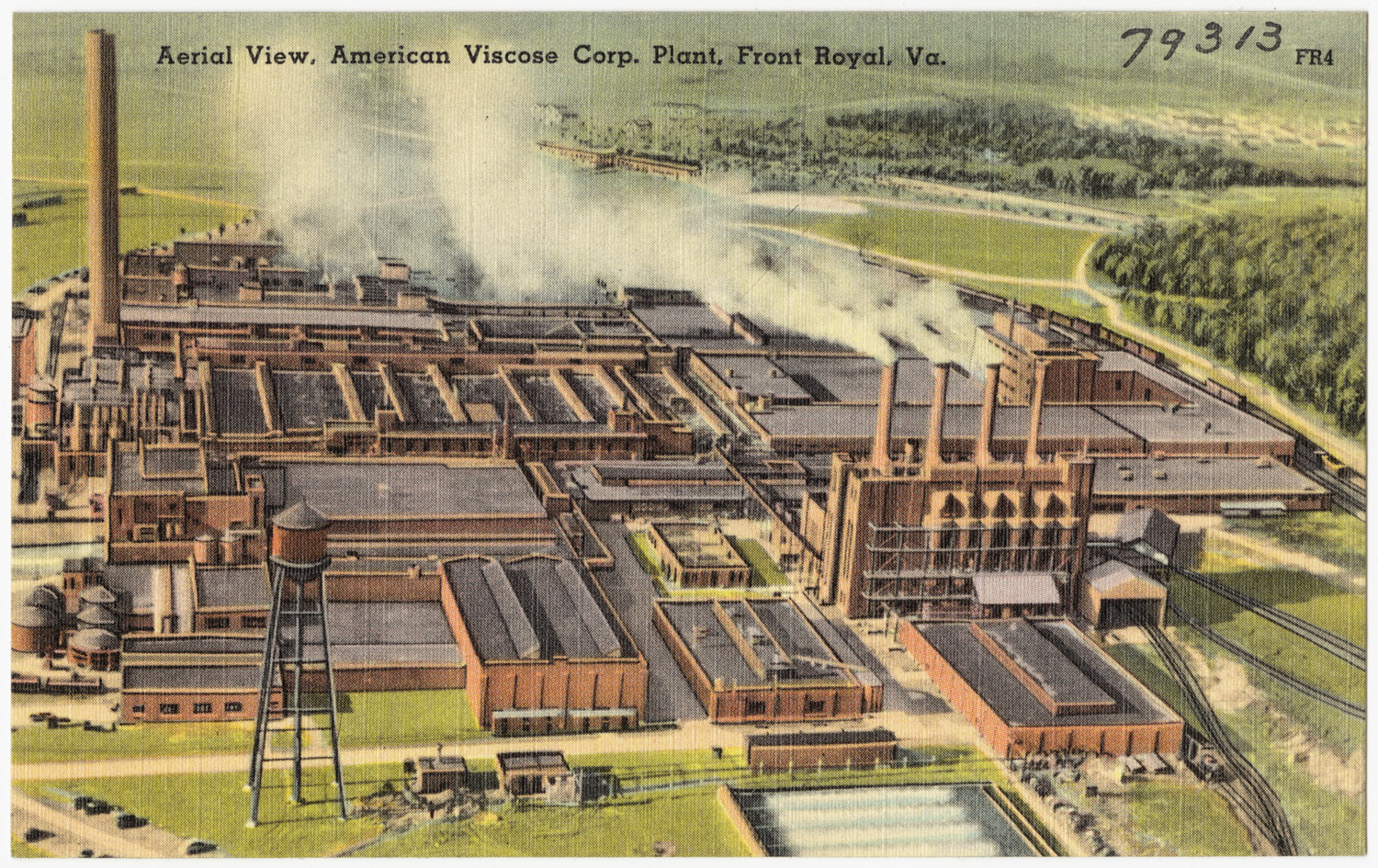
The American Viscose plant in Front Royal, Virginia

Following the conclusion of the war, however, a combination of factors led to the plant's decline. American Viscose had invested in newer facilities in Front Royal, Virginia, and Nitro, West Virginia (the former taking over for Roanoke as possibly the largest rayon factory worldwide), and the Roanoke location was unequipped to produce newer manmade fabrics such as nylon that were supplanting rayon in the market. American Viscose made multiple workforce cuts in the 1950s, and employment was below 2,000 when, in 1958, the company announced their decision to close the plant permanently. The factory's closure was particularly difficult for the region as it came at a time when N&W was transitioning its fleet to diesel and shuttering its Roanoke steam engine shops, which resulted in the loss of 2,000 jobs from that company.

=== Post-closure ===
An option was placed on the American Viscose site in 1959 by Union Carbide, but that company ultimately backed out. In 1961, American Viscose auctioned off its remaining equipment and a consortium of Roanoke investors purchased the property. The site was subdivided and turned into the Roanoke Industrial Center, the city's second industrial park, and as of June 2023 the complex had 120 tenants. Sixteen of the original buildings still stand, many with little alteration. As a precautionary measure against eventual decay, the factory's original smokestacks, once standing 300 feet (91 m) tall, were pared down in 2001. Bricks were removed from the top and gradually dropped inside the hollow chimneys until the level of debris inside reached the level of the walls.

Due to the site's decades of heavy industrial use, in the late 1980s the property saw a preliminary investigation by the federal Superfund program as a potential cleanup location, but deemed not to be a priority. A full investigation by the EPA in 2001 confirmed that assessment. A turn-of-the-century flood control project by the US Army Corps of Engineers was delayed by the complex's history. The concentration of heavy metals in the soil along the Roanoke River by the site of the former plant were at such extreme levels that the city considered removing the section from the project.

The district was added to the National Register of Historic Places in 2019. In 2023, the Roanoke City Council approved a plan to begin transforming the American Viscose district into a mixed-use development called Riverdale. A collaboration between the city, the Roanoke Economic Development Authority, and a local developer, the project granted a $10 million forgivable loan for acquisition and cleanup of the property in return for at least $50 million invested over a 17-year period. Following the sale, preliminary environmental tests at the site located a high potential for vapor intrusion due to a hazardous waste tank that was once located adjacent to the property. Chemsolv, a tenant of the industrial park, had been fined over $600,000 in 2014 for improper waste storage, but the company removed the tank before investigators could properly determine the extent of its effects. As of 2023, a deed restriction was in place prohibiting residential development in the Riverdale site; the owners hope to have the ban lifted after further remediation of the brownfield.
