= James Preserve =

Nature preserve located on Long Island, NY, United States

Coordinates: 40°49′12″N 73°37′6″W

The James Preserve (also known as the Darwin James Preserve) is a nature preserve located on Long Island in the village of Old Brookville in Nassau County, New York, and connected to Greenvale.

== Description ==
The 19.4-acre (7.9 ha) preserve was maintained by The Nature Conservancy prior to being transferred to the North Shore Land Alliance in 2015. People infer it was a former farm seeing as there are abandoned buildings, likely barns, with farming tools inside. It contains a swamp and a river with a bridge crossing over it.

A trail within the preserve leads to Valentines Lane, which leads to another nature preserve, Louis C. Clark Sanctuary.
