= Rynwood =

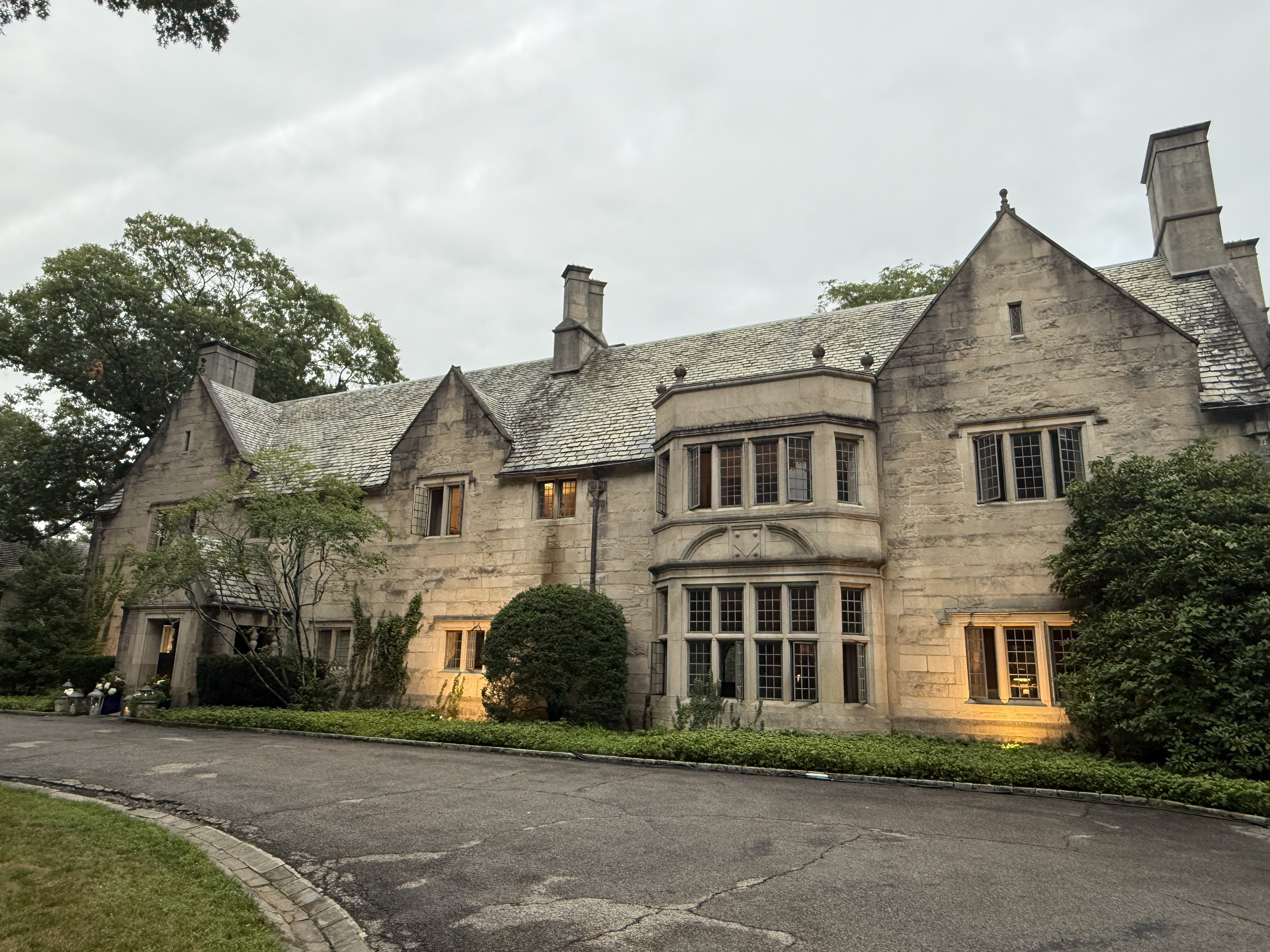
- Rynwood as pictured in 2026.
- Interactive map of the Rynwood area

General information
- Type: House
- Architectural style: Cotswold style
- Location: Old Brookville, New York
- Coordinates: 40°49′51″N 73°35′45″W
- Completed: 1928

Technical details
- Floor area: 40,000 sq. ft.

Design and construction
- Architect: Roger Bullard

The Rynwood estate, is a 51-acre estate, with a Tudor Cotswold-style, 60-room mansion, located in the Village of Old Brookville, New York, on the Gold Coast of Long Island (the home was originally part of the Hamlet of Glen Head, New York). The home was most famously owned by Banfi Vintners, whom operated it as their international headquarters. At that time, the estate was referred to as "Villa Banfi".

== History ==
The home's area, sitting at 40,000 square feet, is tied for the 94th largest residence in the United States. It was designed by Roger Bullard for Samuel Agar Salvage, the "father of Rayon" in the United States. The estate's name was inspired by Salvage's wife, Lady Katherine, whose name was "Ryn" for short.

=== Ironwork ===
Samuel Yellin, an American master blacksmith and ironworker, helped create various designs on the mansion. These included the copper lanterns, brackets, weathervane, lamps, hardware for doors, ceiling lights, electrolier, and antique candles.

=== Architecture ===
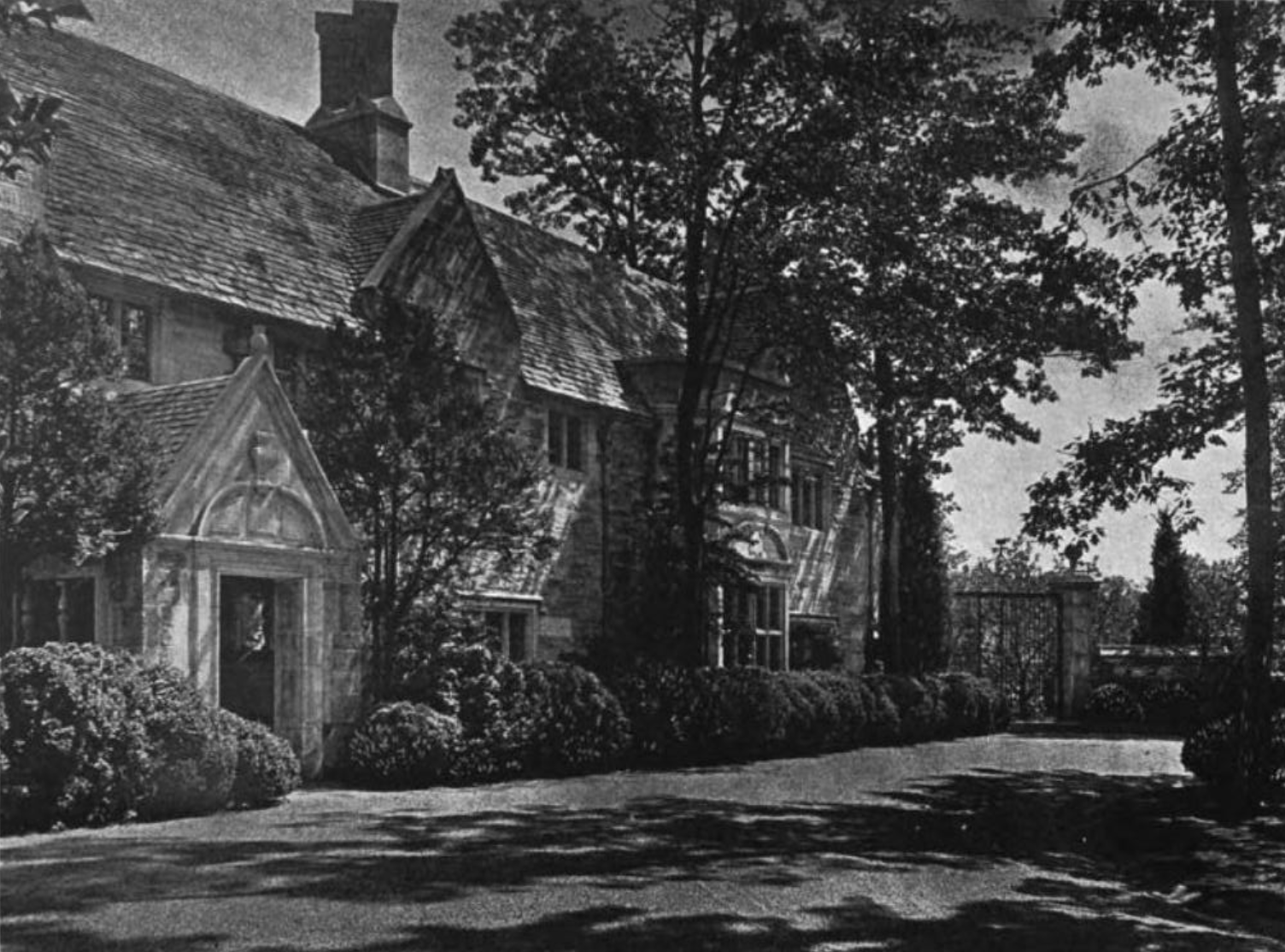
The front facade of Rynwood as pictured shortly after its completion in 1928

In 1929, Bullard received an Honorable Mention in Domestic Architecture at the 44th annual exhibition of the Architectural League of New York and the house was featured in The American Architect several times, which was a weekly architectural periodical at the time. Bullard won the 1933 Better Homes Gold Medal for his design of a cottage on the Rynwood estate.

The home was featured in the July 20, 1930 edition of The Architectural Forum, an American magazine that covered the homebuilding industry and architecture. The Architectural Forum referred to the home as a "free interpretation of a British-American country house."

=== Landscaping ===
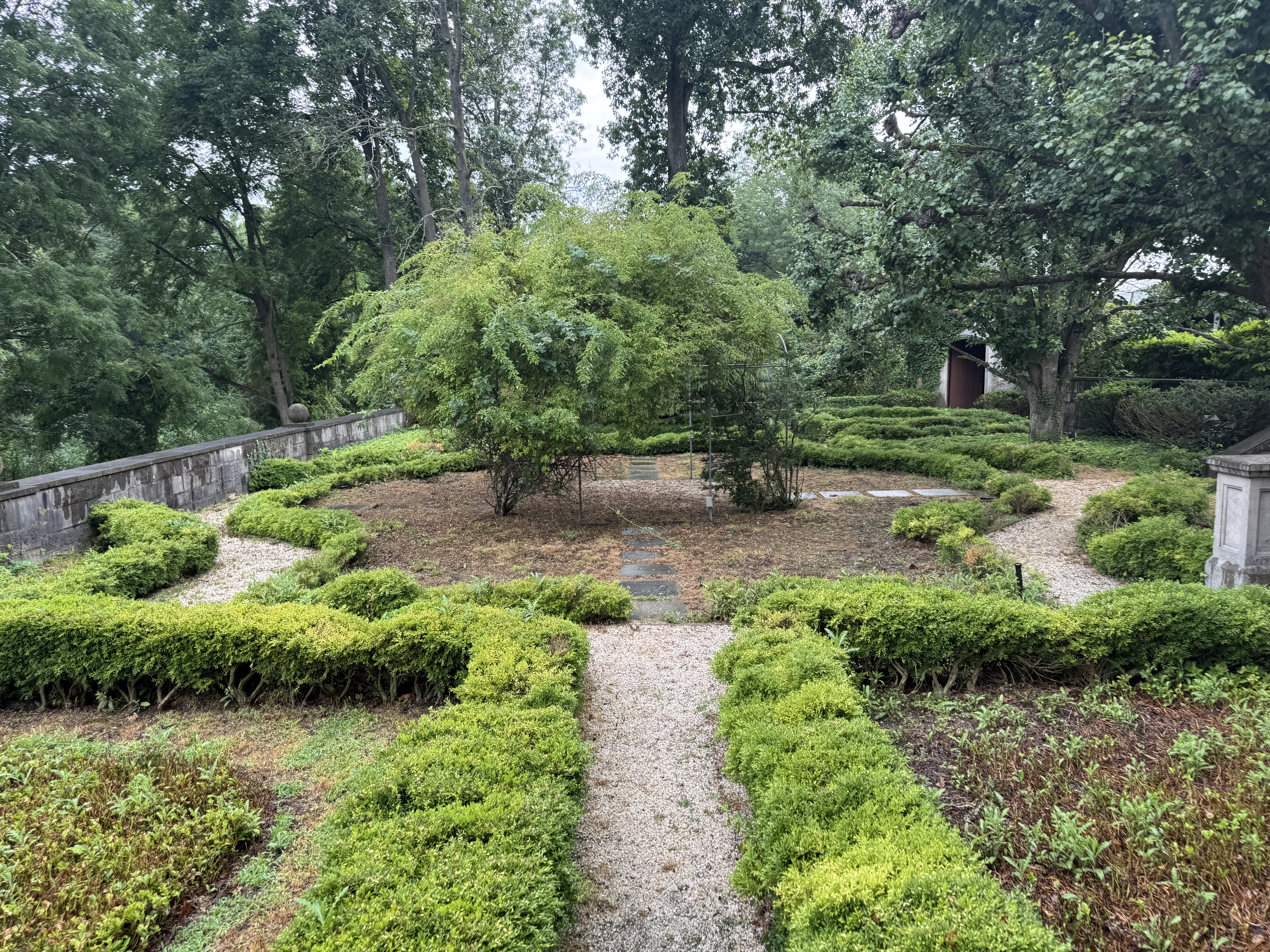
The gardens of Rynwood as pictured in 2026

The landscaping was designed by American landscaping architect, Ellen Biddle Shipman, and is considered one of the best examples from her "mature period." The Gardens of Rynwood are featured in the Smithsonian Institute's Garden Club of America Collection.

The gardenThe gardens of Rynwood as pictured in 2026s were replanted by Innocenti & Webel in 1982, for minimum care. Today the gardens feature 45 acres of vineyard, started in 1982, along with formal lawn terraces. A reflecting pool is approached by descending steps in Edwin Lutyens' style from the upper lawn terrace.

=== Samuel Salvage ===
Salvage held many social events there over the years, including holding a party for Victoria Day or Empire Day, every May 24. Salvage first held a Victoria Day party at the estates in 1928 when he threw a $30,000 housewarming party for 1,500 people, which guests included Sir Esme Howard, the British Ambassador to the United States; Sir Harry Gloster Armstrong, the British Consul-general in New York; and John W. Davis, the former Solicitor General of the United States under President Woodrow Wilson.

=== Banfi ===
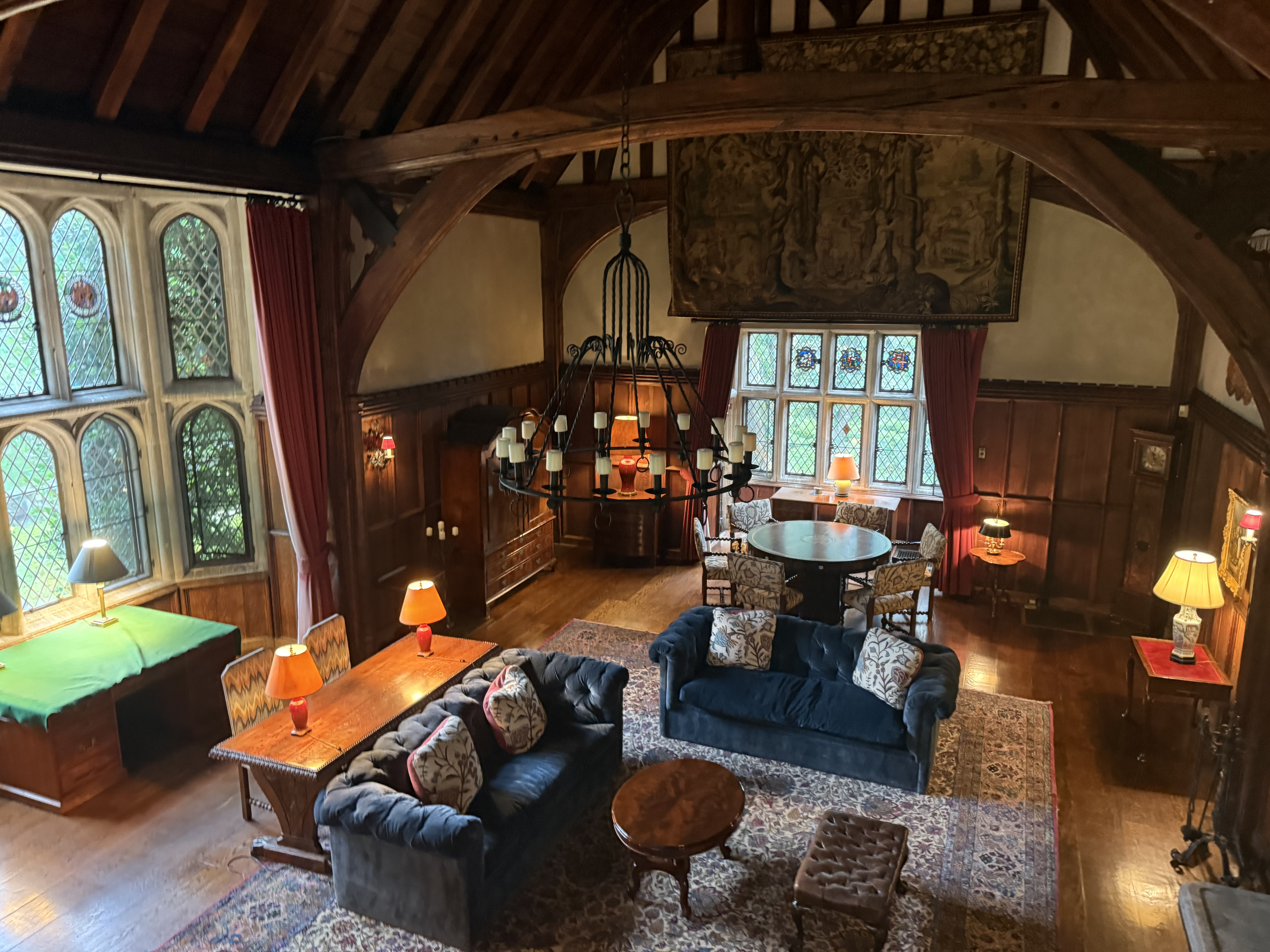
One of Mark Hampton's rooms in Rynwood, presently a Living Area, as pictured in 2026

After Salvage's death in 1946, the ownership changed several times and the house began to deteriorate, possibly being a candidate to be torn down. Fortunately, Banfi purchased the property in 1979 and restored the property with the help of Dr. Marcello Matteini, professor of architecture at the University of Rome, and interior designer, Mark Hampton. Banfi created the North Shore's only commercial vineyard, which produces a chardonnay called Old Brookville Gold Coast Reserve. Over fifty talented artists, artisans and horticulturists worked over three years restoring the palatial residence, showcasing irreplaceable period detail such as exquisite leaded glass windows, stone archways, English oak panelling, beamed ceilings, 17 fireplaces and large formal rooms. In 2019, the property was sold by Banfi to its present owners who plan to convert the house into a private club.

== Owners ==
- Samuel Agar Salvage (1927–1946), the "father of Rayon" in the United States, was the original owner of the estate.
- Margaret Emerson Vanderbilt (1946–1960), widow of Alfred G. Vanderbilt and daughter of Isaac Edward Emerson
- Irving Lundy (1960–1977), owner of Lundy's Restaurant in Brooklyn
- Banfi Vintners (1979–2019), international wine producer and distributor
- Rynwood Holdings LLC (2019–present), recently formed company
