= The House that Lives =

Historic house in New Jersey, United States

- U.S. National Register of Historic Places
- New Jersey Register of Historic Places
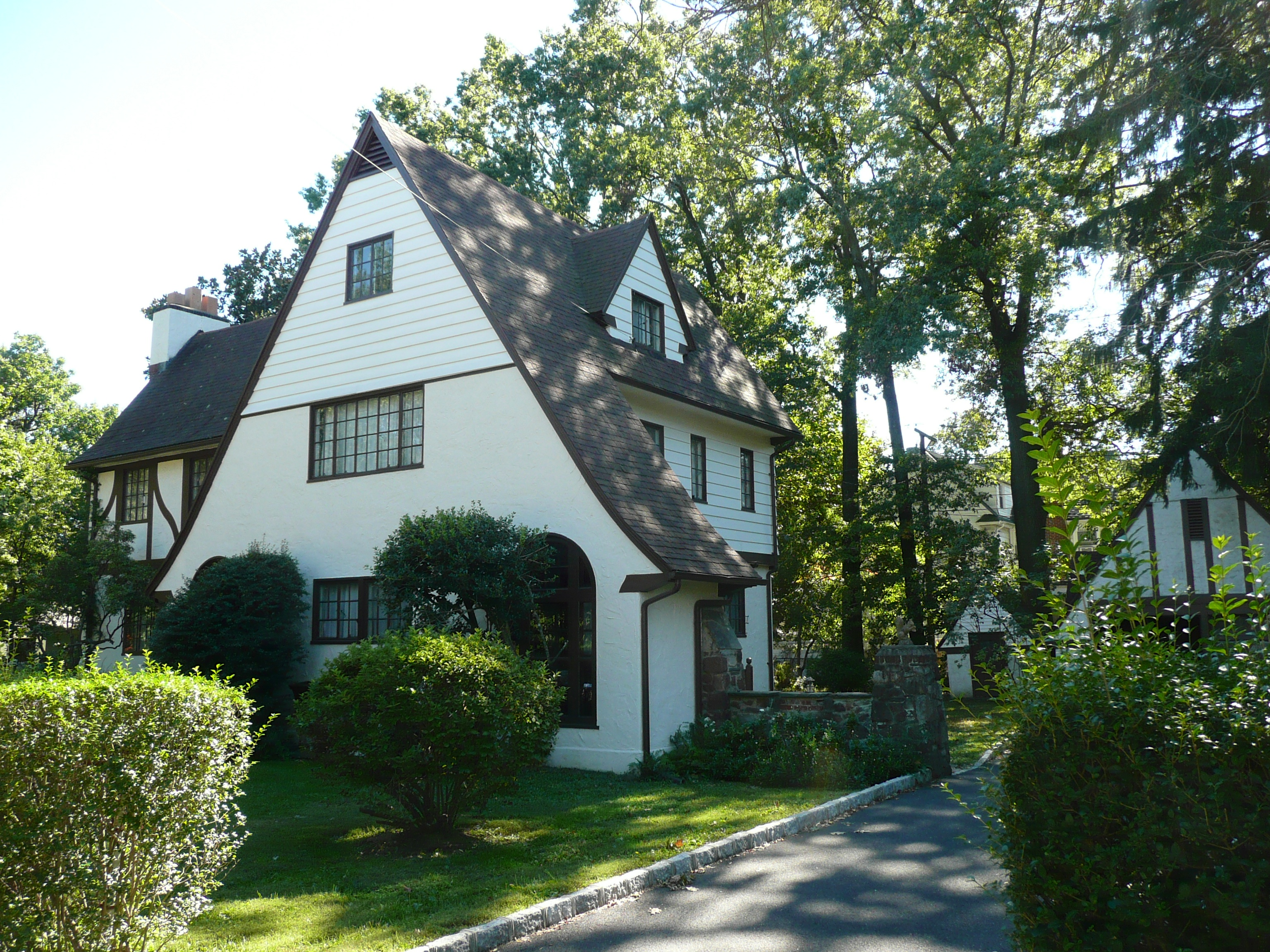

- Location within Essex County, New Jersey Location within New Jersey Location within the United States
- Location: 83 Watchung Avenue, Montclair, New Jersey
- Coordinates: 40°49′52″N 74°12′34″W
- Built: 1922
- Architect: Clifford C. Wendehack
- Architectural style: Modern Movement, Tudor Revival
- MPS: Montclair MRA
- NRHP reference No.: 86002976
- NJRHP No.: 1136

Significant dates
- Added to NRHP: July 1, 1988
- Designated NJRHP: September 29, 1986

The House that Lives is a historic house located at 83 Watchung Avenue in the township of Montclair in Essex County, New Jersey, United States. It was built in 1922 and designed by architect Clifford C. Wendehack with Modern Movement and Tudor Revival elements. The house was added to the National Register of Historic Places on July 1, 1988, for its significance in architecture. It was listed in the Selection of Montclair's Published Houses section of the Historic Resources of Montclair Multiple Property Submission (MPS).

The house received its name from the Woman's Club of Upper Montclair, which exhibited the house during its "Better Homes Week" in June 1923.

== See also ==
- National Register of Historic Places listings in Essex County, New Jersey
