= Old Brookville, New York =

- Village
- Incorporated Village of Old Brookville
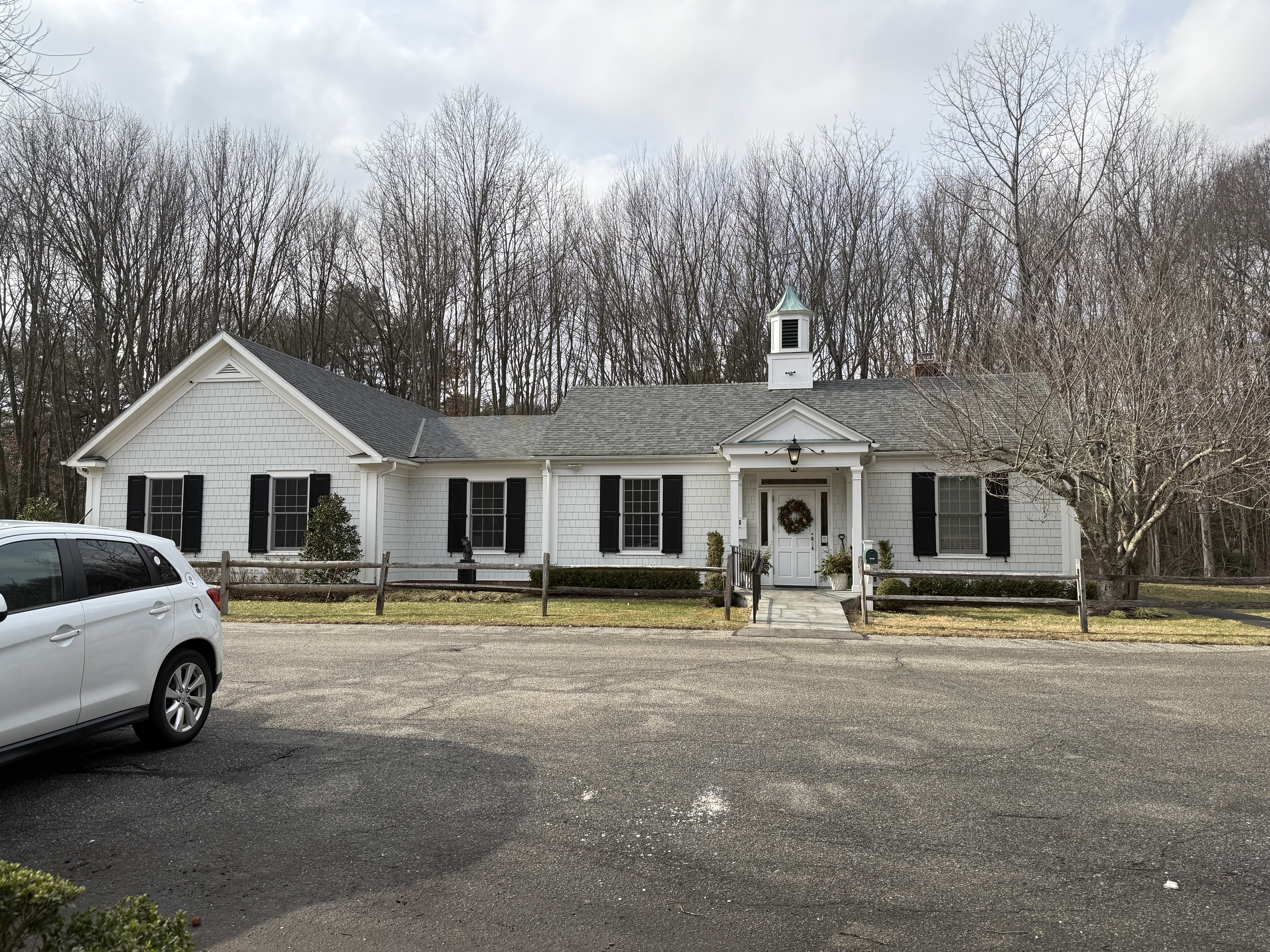
- Old Brookville Village Hall in 2026

- Location in Nassau County and the state of New York

- Location on Long Island Location within the state of New York
- Coordinates: 40°49′38″N 73°36′7″W
- Country: United States
- State: New York
- County: Nassau
- Town: Oyster Bay
- Incorporated: November 7, 1929

Government
  - Mayor: Bernard D. Ryba

Area
  - Total: 3.98 sq mi (10.32 km^{2})
  - Land: 3.98 sq mi (10.31 km^{2})
  - Water: 0 sq mi (0.00 km^{2})
- Elevation: 95 ft (29 m)

Population (2020)
  - Total: 2,020
  - Density: 507.2/sq mi (195.85/km^{2})
- Time zone: UTC-5 (Eastern (EST))
  - Summer (DST): UTC-4 (EDT)
- ZIP codes: 11545 (Glen Head); 11548 (Greenvale)
- Area codes: 516, 363
- FIPS code: 36-54562
- GNIS feature ID: 0959256
- Website: www.oldbrookville.net

Old Brookville is a village located within the Town of Oyster Bay in Nassau County, on the North Shore of Long Island, in New York, United States. As of the 2020 census, Old Brookville had a population of 2,020.

== History ==
Old Brookville incorporated as a village on November 7, 1929. The current Village Hall was dedicated in June 1963 on land donated by Alistair B. Martin.

== Geography ==
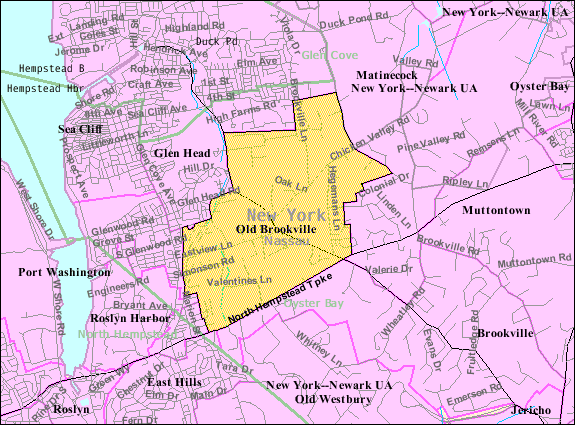
U.S. Census map of Old Brookville

According to the United States Census Bureau, the village has a total area of 4.0 square miles (10 km^{2}), all land.

Glen Cove Creek – the brook from which the village's name is derived – runs through the western end of the village.

== Demographics ==
Historical population
Census	Pop.	Note	%±
1930	423		—
1940	356		−15.8%
1950	644		80.9%
1960	1,126		74.8%
1970	1,785		58.5%
1980	1,574		−11.8%
1990	1,823		15.8%
2000	2,167		18.9%
2010	2,134		−1.5%
2020	2,020		−5.3%
U.S. Decennial Census

At the 2000 census there were 2,167 people, 722 households, and 618 families in the village. The population density was 545.2 inhabitants per square mile (210.5/km^{2}). There were 760 housing units at an average density of 191.2 per square mile (73.8/km^{2}). The racial makeup of the village was 89.20% White, 1.43% African American, 7.34% Asian, 0.55% from other races, and 1.48% from two or more races. Hispanic or Latino of any race were 2.03%.

Of the 722 households 36.3% had children under the age of 18 living with them, 76.6% were married couples living together, 7.3% had a female householder with no husband present, and 14.4% were non-families. 11.2% of households were one person and 6.0% were one person aged 65 or older. The average household size was 3.00 and the average family size was 3.22.

The age distribution was 25.4% under the age of 18, 5.5% from 18 to 24, 23.1% from 25 to 44, 30.5% from 45 to 64, and 15.6% 65 or older. The median age was 43 years. For every 100 females, there were 97.7 males. For every 100 females age 18 and over, there were 91.8 males.

The median household income was $233,192 and the median family income was $255,731. Males had a median income of $108,562 versus $82,625 for females. The per capita income for the village was $98,874. About 0.3% of families and 0.4% of the population were below the poverty line, including 0.2% of those under age 18 and 0.7% of those age 65 or over.

== Government ==
=== Village government ===
As of August 2021, the Mayor of Old Brookville was Bernard D. Ryba and the Village Trustees were William Clarke, Frank Galluzzo, Lori Golden, and John Vasilakis.

=== Representation in higher government ===
==== Nassau County representation ====
Old Brookville is primarily located within Nassau County's 18th Legislative district, which as of April 2025 is represented in the Nassau County Legislature by Samantha A. Goetz (R–Locust Valley).

==== New York State representation ====
===== New York State Assembly =====
Old Brookville is located within New York's 15th State Assembly district, which as of April 2025 is represented in the New York State Assembly by Jacob Ryan Blumencranz (R–Oyster Bay).

===== New York State Senate =====
Old Brookville is located within the New York State Senate's 7th State Senate district, which as of April 2025 is represented in the New York State Senate by Jack M. Martins (R–Old Westbury).

==== Federal representation ====
===== United States Congress =====
Old Brookville is located within New York's 3rd congressional district, which as of April 2025 is represented in the United States Congress by Thomas R. Suozzi (D–Glen Cove).

==== United States Senate ====
Like the rest of New York, Old Brookville is represented in the United States Senate by Charles Schumer (D) and Kirsten Gillibrand (D).

=== Politics ===
In the 2024 United States presidential election, the majority of Old Brookville voters voted for Donald J. Trump (R).

== Parks and recreation ==
Old Brookville is home to the Louis C. Clark Sanctuary and the James Preserve. Both of these protected nature preserves are located in the western half of the village, along Glen Cove Creek, and are owned and operated by the North Shore Land Alliance.

== Education ==
Old Brookville is primarily located within the boundaries of – and is thus served by – the North Shore Central School District. However, some of the eastern side of the village is within the boundaries of – and is served by – the Locust Valley Central School District.

== Notable people ==
- Jordan Belfort, The Wolf of Wall Street, American entrepreneur, speaker, author, former stockbroker, and financial criminal
- Rick DiPietro, Former National Hockey League Goalie for the New York Islanders
- Jessica Foschi, Former competitive swimmer
- Irving Lundy (1960–1977), owner of Lundy's Restaurant in Brooklyn, lived at Rynwood
- Julian S. Mason, newspaper editor and writer
- Chad Pennington, Former National Football League New York Jets and Miami Dolphins Quarterback
- Jose Reyes, Former Major League Baseball Player for the New York Mets
- Samuel Agar Salvage (1927–1946), the "father of Rayon" in the United States, was the original owner of Rynwood
- Max Scherzer, Major League Baseball Pitcher for the New York Mets
- Garth Snow, Former National Hockey League Goalie and former General Manager of the New York Islanders
- Frederica von Stade, Operatic mezzo-soprano, lived in Valentines Lane

== See also ==
- List of municipalities in New York
- Brookville, New York
- Upper Brookville, New York
