= Samuel Agar Salvage =

British businessman (1876-1946)

Sir Samuel Agar Salvage
- Born: November 20, 1876; London, England
- Died: July 10, 1946 (aged 69); Fisher's Island, New York, U.S.
- Known for: President of The Viscose Company
- Spouse: Mary K. Richmond
- Children: 3

Samuel Agar Salvage KBE OBE (November 20, 1876 – July 10, 1946) was an English businessman, sometimes called the "father of the rayon industry in the United States."

== Biography ==
Salvage was born in London and emigrated to the United States in 1893 at age 17. In 1925, he became the president of The Viscose Company and was later chairman of the board.

In 1942, he was appointed Knight Commander of the Order of the British Empire for his contributions to the rayon industry.

== Personal life ==
Salvage married Mary Katherine Richmond (died 1964) and lived together at their home in Old Brookville, New York, called Rynwood, which Salvage had built in 1927 by architect Roger Bullard, with gardens designed by Ellen Biddle Shipman. Together, they had three daughters: Katherine H. Salvage, Margaret S. Salvage and Magdelaine S. Salvage.

Salvage died July 10, 1946, at his home on Fisher's Island, New York.

=== Descendants ===
Salvage's grandson is Charles Taliaferro (b. 1952), the philosopher specializing in Theology and Philosophy of Religion at St. Olaf College.

== See also ==
- Frank Polk
