= Roger Bullard =

American architect (1884–1935)

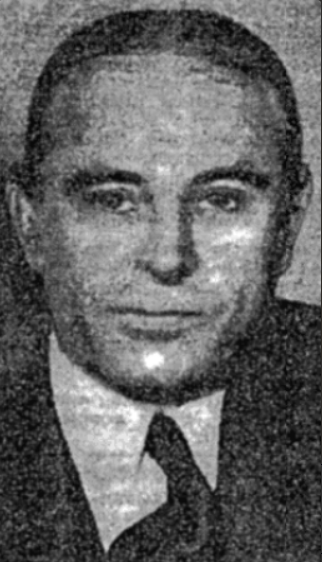
- Bullard in 1925
- Born: May 7, 1884; New York, New York, U.S.
- Died: March 2, 1935 (aged 50); Plandome, New York
- Education: Columbia University School of Architecture
- Occupation: architect
- Spouse: Annie Sturges (m. 1912)
- Children: 4
- Awards: Gold medal from Better Homes in America in the Small House Architectural Competition (1933); Honorable Mention from the American Institute of Architects (1931)
- Buildings: Salutation, America's Little House, Rynwood, St. Joseph's Chapel
- Projects: Maidstone Club

Roger Harrington Bullard (May 7, 1884 – March 2, 1935) was an American architect.

== Early life and education ==
Bullard was born on May 7, 1884, in New York City to Lewis Henderson Bullard and Mary Perrin Bullard. His family lived in a home at 147-38 Ash Avenue in Flushing, Queens from 1884 to 1909.

Bullard was educated at public schools and the Fairfield Institute. He graduated from the Columbia University School of Architecture in 1907. While at Columbia, he was a member of St. Anthony Hall.

== Career ==
After graduating from Columbia, he worked as an architect with the Office of Public Works (Auxiliar Obras Publicas) for the next two years in Cuba. Returning to the U.S., he worked for ten years under Grosvenor Atterbury in Long Island before becoming a partner in the firm of Goodwin, Bullard & Woolsey. In 1921, he opened his own office at 607 Fifth Avenue in Manhattan.

He received an honorable mention from the American Institute of Architects for an apartment house in Manhattan (1931), and a Gold Medal from Better Homes in America in the Small House Architectural Competition (1933) for a small cottage he built for Samuel Agar Salvage in Glen Head, New York. Bullard, along with architect Clifford C. Wendehack, designed the model home known as "America's Little House" which opened in 1934 and was surrounded by skyscrapers on the northeast corner of Park Avenue and 39th Street in Manhattan.

Through his wife's connection to J. P. Morgan, Bullard built several houses for the extended Morgan family. Perhaps most notably he built Salutation at Glen Cove on Long Island, which he completed for Junius Spencer Morgan III, which is said to be the inspiration for the West Egg mansion of Jay Gatsby in The Great Gatsby. Another notable Gold Coast, Long Island mansion he designed was Rynwood for Samuel Agar Salvage, the "father of rayon" in the United States.

He gained a reputation for designing large homes and country clubs, most on Long Island. The clubs he designed included the Maidstone Club at East Hampton, New York; Plainfield Country Club in Edison, New Jersey; Oakland Golf Club in Bayside, Queens; and the Milwaukee Country Club in River Hills, Wisconsin. His private clients included the Morgan family; Samuel Agar Salvage; Harold Hartshorne; Paul Pennoyer Sr.; and Seth Low Pierrepont.

Bullard was a member of the executive committee of the New York chapter of the American Institute of Architects and the Architectural League of New York. He was also a member of Lloyd Warren's Beaux-Arts Institute of Design and the New York Society of Architects.

== Awards ==
- Gold medal from Better Homes in America in the Small House Architectural Competition (1933) for the cottage on the Rynwood Estate
- Honorable Mention from the American Institute of Architects (1931) for an apartment house in Manhattan

== Personal life ==
In 1912, Bullard married Annie Sturges, daughter of Henry Cady Sturges. She was a niece of the first wife of J. P. Morgan. The couple had four children: Roger, Henry, Jonathan, and Mary.

Bullard died from pneumonia on March 2, 1935, in Plandome, New York.

== Notable works ==
=== Country clubs and golf courses ===
- Maidstone Club in East Hampton, New York
- Plainfield Country Club in Edison, New Jersey
- Oakland Golf Club in Bayside, Queens
- Milwaukee Country Club in River Hills, Wisconsin

=== Other notable projects ===
- Salutation in Glen Cove, Long Island for Junius Spencer Morgan III
- America's Little House in Manhattan, New York
- Rynwood Estate in Long Island, for Sir Samuel Agar Salvage
- St. Joseph's Chapel at the Kent School, in Kent, Connecticut
