= Flushing – Main Street =

Flushing – Main Street may refer to:

- Main Street (Queens) in Flushing, New York
- Flushing–Main Street (IRT Flushing Line), a New York City Subway station along Main Street in Flushing, serving the 7 and <7> trains
- Flushing–Main Street station (LIRR), a Long Island Rail Road station along Main Street in Flushing, serving the Port Washington Branch
