= Norwood Country Club =

Golf club in West Long Branch, NJ

Coordinates: 40°17′30″N 74°00′47″W

Norwood Country Club was an exclusive golf club in West Long Branch, New Jersey, during the 1920s. The old club house of the golf course is now the West Long Branch Community Center.
