= Better Homes in America =

American national educational organization

1930 advertisement in San Diego Union

Better Homes in America was a national educational organization that evolved from the Better Homes Movement, a nationwide campaign of home ownership, modernization, and beautification that was first launched in 1922. The organization was dissolved in 1935 due to a lack of funds.

== History ==
In 1922 the United States embraced the Better Homes Movement, a nationwide campaign of home ownership, modernization, and beautification because of a critical shortage of homes in the years right after World War I. The movement was initiated in the pages of the Butterick Publishing Company's household magazine, The Delineator, under the editorship of Marie Mattingly Meloney. The campaign celebrated home ownership, home maintenance and improvement, and home decoration as means of motivating responsible consumer behavior; it also expanded the market for consumer products. Annual local campaigns — or "better homes demonstration weeks" — encouraged people to own, build, remodel, and improve their homes and distributed advice on creating home furnishings and decorations. In 1923, another department publication promoted ethnic and racial homogeneity by urging potential home buyers to consider the "general type of people living in the neighborhood" before making a purchase.

Oakland Tribune Builder's Page, August 1922.

President Warren G. Harding and Secretary of Commerce Herbert Hoover kicked off the first Better Homes Week in October 1922 for the National Better Homes Advisory Council. The campaign centered on the 100th anniversary of John Howard Payne’s song Home! Sweet Home!. The Better Homes Movement received broad support from both government and industry. Vice-President Calvin Coolidge served as honorary chairman of the Advisory Council of Better Homes in America, and Secretary of Commerce Herbert Hoover was president of its board of directors.

To commemorate the Better Homes Movement, in 1923 a replica of Payne's colonial childhood home in Long Island, New York, was designed by architect Donn Barber and built in Washington, D.C. on the Sherman Monument Plaza. More than a million people visited the Payne House, and newspapers across America promoted other small Colonial Revival cottages like it. The house was moved to a location on New York Avenue the following year and was used by the Girl Scouts until 1955. The house was torn down during the 1970s.

Because of the patriotic and national sentiment of these years so soon after World War I, many of the model homes exhibited various Colonial Revival architectural elements. Newspapers often published designs of modest homes that were affordable and attractive to encourage new home construction under the Better Homes program.

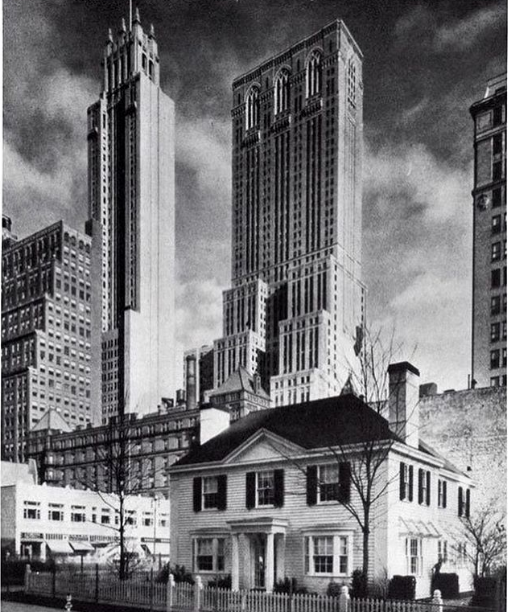
America's Little House in New York City

The Guidebook for Better Homes Campaigns in Rural Communities and Small Towns shows how the campaign sought to communicate its ideas. School Cottages for Training in Home-making shows how high school courses incorporated the ideas of the campaign. The movement sought to educate consumers, but it also served the interests of powerful groups and organizations: The connection between the campaign's educational and commercial concerns is illustrated by Hoover's essay "The Home as an Investment" in the Better Homes in America Plan Book for Demonstration Week, October 9 to 14, 1922. See also: "Homemaker-Consumer Life in Washington, D.C., 1922-23" from the Anna Kelton Wiley Papers.

In 1934, a Better Homes in America project, America's Little House was designed and built by Roger Bullard in New York City on Park Avenue and 39th Street. It was a two story home with a white-picket fence situated amongst the towering skyscrapers of the metropolitan city. Bullard won the Gold Medal in the 1933 Better Homes in America small homes design competition. It was meant to promote single-family homeownership, modernization, and improvements.

Better Homes in America was dissolved in 1935 due to a lack of funds and its holdings were transferred to the Housing Research Foundation at Purdue University.

== Notable members ==
- C. Louise Boehringer, State Chairman, appointed in 1928 by Herbert Hoover
