= National Register of Historic Places listings in Roanoke, Virginia =

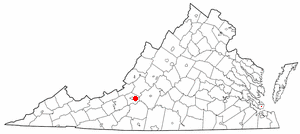
Location of Roanoke in Virginia

Roanoke, Virginia, United States, has 59 properties and districts listed on the National Register of Historic Places. Another property was once listed but has been removed.

The locations of National Register properties and districts for which the latitude and longitude coordinates are included below may be seen in an online map.

This National Park Service list is complete through NPS recent listings posted August 21, 2026.

== Current listings ==
	Name on the Register	Image	Date listed	Location	Description
1	American Viscose Plant Historic District	American Viscose Plant Historic District	August 6, 2019 (#100004260)	Roughly 9th St., SE., Industry Ave., SE., River Ave., SE., and Progressive Dr., SE. 37°15′20″N 79°55′20″W	
2	Apartment Building on Windsor Avenue and Brunswick St.	Apartment Building on Windsor Avenue and Brunswick St.	August 23, 2010 (#10000559)	2049 Windsor Ave., SW. 37°15′47″N 79°58′49″W	
3	Belle Aire	Belle Aire	April 15, 1975 (#75002034)	U.S. Route 11; 37°15′49″N 80°01′03″W	
4	Belmont Historic District	Belmont Historic District	April 15, 2019 (#100003618)	Albemarle, Bullitt, Elm, Jamison, Dale, Campbell, Cedar Bluff, Church, Highland, Mountain, Stewart, Tazewell, and White Aves., SE., and 4th-11th Sts., SE. 37°16′12″N 79°55′45″W	
5	Belmont Methodist-Episcopal Church	Belmont Methodist-Episcopal Church	August 18, 2011 (#11000551)	806 Jamison Ave., SE. 37°16′09″N 79°55′49″W	
6	Boxley Building	Boxley Building	March 8, 1984 (#84003587)	416 Jefferson St., SW. 37°16′12″N 79°56′25″W	
7	Boxley-Sprinkle House	Boxley-Sprinkle House	November 27, 2004 (#04001275)	2611 Crystal Spring Ave. 37°14′39″N 79°57′01″W	
8	Buena Vista	Buena Vista	July 30, 1974 (#74002244)	Penmar Ave. and 9th St. 37°15′50″N 79°55′23″W	
9	Burrell Memorial Hospital	Burrell Memorial Hospital	September 22, 2003 (#03000450)	611 McDowell St. 37°16′57″N 79°56′58″W	
10	Campbell Avenue Complex	Campbell Avenue Complex	January 24, 1991 (#90002171)	118-128 Campbell Ave., SW. 37°16′18″N 79°56′37″W	
11	Carlin's Amoco Station	Carlin's Amoco Station	November 20, 2012 (#12000968)	1721 Williamson Rd., NE. 37°17′17″N 79°56′00″W	
12	City of Roanoke Fire Station No. 5	City of Roanoke Fire Station No. 5	November 18, 2011 (#11000838)	216 12th St., NW. 37°16′45″N 79°57′32″W	
13	The Coffee Pot	The Coffee Pot	May 31, 1996 (#96000575)	2902 Brambleton Ave., SW. 37°14′36″N 79°59′28″W	
14	Colonial National Bank	Colonial National Bank	December 17, 1983 (#83004035)	202-208 Jefferson St. 37°16′18″N 79°56′25″W	
15	Colony House Motor Lodge	Colony House Motor Lodge	March 8, 2023 (#100008648)	3560 Franklin Rd. SW; 37°14′11″N 79°58′09″W	
16	Crystal Spring Steam Pumping Station	Crystal Spring Steam Pumping Station	May 23, 1980 (#80004220)	2016 Lake St., SE; 37°14′59″N 79°56′38″W	
17	English Gardens Apartments	English Gardens Apartments	August 17, 2022 (#100008022)	2325, 2331, 2333, 2339, 2343, 2345, 2349 Memorial Ave. SW, 1208, 1218, 1222 Fauquier St. SW, 2324, 2330, 2332, 2336, 2340, 2346, 2352 Denniston Ave. SW; 37°16′05″N 79°59′13″W	
18	Fire Station No. 1	Fire Station No. 1	May 7, 1973 (#73002224)	13 E. Church Ave. 37°16′13″N 79°56′24″W	
19	First National Bank	First National Bank	June 14, 1982 (#82004591)	101 S. Jefferson St. 37°16′20″N 79°56′27″W	
20	Gainsboro Branch of the Roanoke City Public Library	Gainsboro Branch of the Roanoke City Public Library	December 2, 1996 (#96001448)	15 Patton Ave., NW. 37°16′38″N 79°56′28″W	
21	Gainsboro Historic District	Gainsboro Historic District	November 16, 2005 (#05001276)	Bounded by Wells, Centre, the First Street Bridge, Gilmer, Commonwealth, N. Jefferson, 2nd., Patton, Harrison, and other streets 37°16′36″N 79°56′40″W	
22	Grandin Road Commercial Historic District	Grandin Road Commercial Historic District	November 27, 2002 (#02001450)	Grandin Rd., SW., and Memorial Ave. 37°15′57″N 79°58′37″W	
23	Harrison School	Harrison School	September 9, 1982 (#82004592)	523 Harrison Ave., NW. 37°16′46″N 79°56′53″W	
24	Henry Street Historic District	Henry Street Historic District	November 27, 2004 (#04001276)	100 block of Henry St., NW. 37°16′28″N 79°56′32″W	
25	Patrick Henry Hotel	Patrick Henry Hotel	July 3, 1991 (#91000829)	617 S. Jefferson St. 37°16′07″N 79°56′27″W	
26	Hotel Roanoke	Hotel Roanoke	February 16, 1996 (#96000033)	110 Shenandoah Ave. 37°16′28″N 79°56′22″W	
27	Huntingdon	Huntingdon	November 8, 1991 (#91001598)	320 Huntingdon Boulevard; 37°18′28″N 79°56′15″W	
28	Keeper's Cottage, Fishburn Park	Keeper's Cottage, Fishburn Park	July 17, 2026 (#100013230)	2424 Brambleton Avenue SW; 37°14′50″N 79°58′58″W	
29	H. L. Lawson & Son Warehouse	H. L. Lawson & Son Warehouse	September 5, 2008 (#08000830)	631 Campbell Ave., SE. 37°16′20″N 79°56′00″W	
30	Lone Oaks	Lone Oaks	April 11, 1973 (#73002054)	3402 Grandin Rd. Ext., SW. 37°14′57″N 80°00′18″W	
31	Lucy Addison High School	Lucy Addison High School	August 12, 2025 (#100012118)	40 Douglass Avenue NW; 37°17′00″N 79°56′24″W	
32	Melrose-Rugby Historic District	Melrose-Rugby Historic District	August 27, 2013 (#13000645)	Mercer, Grayson, and Carroll Aves., NW., Rugby Boulevard, NW., and 10th, 11th, 12th, 13th, and 14th Sts., NW. 37°17′14″N 79°57′16″W	
33	Monterey	Monterey	July 30, 1974 (#74002146)	Tinker Creek Lane, NE. 37°18′14″N 79°55′01″W	
34	Mount Moriah Baptist Church And Cemetery	Mount Moriah Baptist Church And Cemetery	September 8, 1994 (#94001092)	3521 E. Orange Ave. 37°18′16″N 79°53′27″W	
35	Mountain View	Mountain View	October 31, 1980 (#80004221)	714 13th St., SW. 37°16′10″N 79°57′50″W	Also known as the Junius Fishburn House
36	Norfolk & Western Class A No. 1218 Locomotive	Norfolk & Western Class A No. 1218 Locomotive	May 19, 2025 (#100011843)	303 Norfolk Avenue SW; 37°16′22″N 79°56′50″W	
37	Norfolk & Western Class J No. 611 Locomotive	Norfolk & Western Class J No. 611 Locomotive	February 8, 2024 (#100009961)	303 Norfolk Avenue SW; 37°16′22″N 79°56′50″W	
38	Norfolk and Western Railway Company Historic District	Norfolk and Western Railway Company Historic District	January 27, 1999 (#99000076)	88 and 108 Jefferson St., NW., and 209 Shenandoah Ave. 37°16′26″N 79°56′28″W	
39	Norfolk & Western Railway Freight Station	Norfolk & Western Railway Freight Station	November 21, 2012 (#12000969)	303 Norfolk Ave. 37°16′23″N 79°56′46″W	Now serves as the location for the Virginia Museum of Transportation
40	Norwich Historic District	Norwich Historic District	September 17, 2024 (#100010835)	1815-2433 Roanoke Avenue SW, 614-920 Bridge Street SW, Penn Street SW, Russell Avenue SW, Buford Avenue SW, Charlevoix Court SW, Irvine Street SW, Warwick Street SW, Rolfe Street SW, Ashlawn Street SW, and Bedford Street SW; 37°16′13″N 79°58′34″W	
41	Riverland Historic District	Riverland Historic District	August 27, 2013 (#13000646)	Laural, Primrose, Whitman, and Ivy Sts., Riverland Rd., and Walnut and Arbutus Aves. 37°15′30″N 79°56′03″W	
42	Roanoke Apartments	Roanoke Apartments	November 9, 2006 (#06000759)	1402 Maiden Lane; 37°15′50″N 79°58′07″W	
43	Roanoke City Firehouse No. 6	Roanoke City Firehouse No. 6	January 24, 1991 (#90002162)	1015 Jamison Ave., SE. 37°16′11″N 79°55′34″W	
44	Roanoke City Health Center	Roanoke City Health Center	May 12, 2016 (#16000263)	515 8th St., SW. 37°16′14″N 79°57′21″W	
45	Roanoke City Market Historic District	Roanoke City Market Historic District	April 20, 1983 (#83003312)	Roughly bounded by Williamson Rd., Norfolk Ave., S. Jefferson St., and Church Ave.; also 302 Campbell Ave., SE., and 9 Church Ave., SE. 37°16′18″N 79°56′21″W	Second set of addresses represents a boundary increase of June 6, 2002
46	Roanoke Downtown Historic District	Roanoke Downtown Historic District	September 14, 2002 (#02000978)	Roughly bounded by 3rd St., Norfolk Ave., Jefferson St., and Bullitt Ave.; also 310-324 Salem Ave., SW.; also the 300-400 blocks of Church and 300-400 blocks of Luck Aves., SW., 600-700 blocks of S. Jefferson St., and 401 3rd and 502 5th Sts., SW. 37°16′16″N 79°56′33″W	Second and third sets of boundaries represent boundary increases of March 29, 2007 and August 27, 2013 respectively
47	Roanoke River and Railroad Historic District	Roanoke River and Railroad Historic District	December 24, 2013 (#13000994)	Albemarle and Walnut Aves., SE., Williamson Rd., SE., and 4th and Jefferson Sts., SE. 37°15′35″N 79°56′20″W	
48	Roanoke Star	Roanoke Star	November 15, 1999 (#99001375)	Mill Mountain; 37°15′03″N 79°55′57″W	
49	Roanoke Warehouse Historic District	Roanoke Warehouse Historic District	March 29, 1983 (#83003313)	109-133 Norfolk Ave., SW. 37°16′23″N 79°56′36″W	
50	Tayloe Rogers House	Tayloe Rogers House	November 21, 2012 (#12000970)	1542 Electric Rd., SW. 37°15′25″N 80°02′01″W	
51	St. Andrew's Roman Catholic Church	St. Andrew's Roman Catholic Church	May 7, 1973 (#73002225)	631 N. Jefferson St. 37°16′42″N 79°56′24″W	
52	St. John's Episcopal Church	St. John's Episcopal Church	August 23, 1991 (#91001083)	Southwestern corner of Jefferson St. and Elm Ave. 37°16′00″N 79°56′28″W	
53	Salem Avenue-Roanoke Automotive Commercial Historic District	Salem Avenue-Roanoke Automotive Commercial Historic District	August 8, 2007 (#07000807)	Generally Salem Ave., Rorer Ave., and Campbell Ave. between 3rd and 6th Sts.; also the 400-600 blocks of Campbell Ave.; also the 700 block of Patterson Ave. 37°16′21″N 79°56′58″W	Second and third sets of boundaries represent boundary increases of May 15, 2008 and October 22, 2014 respectively
54	Salvation Army Citadel	Salvation Army Citadel	August 7, 2020 (#100005429)	821 Salem Ave., SW. 37°16′25″N 79°57′23″W	
55	Southwest Historic District	Southwest Historic District	June 19, 1985 (#85001349)	Roughly bounded by Salem Ave., Jefferson St., the Roanoke River, and 20th St.; also roughly bounded by Westview, Westport, Salem, Jackson, Norfolk, Rorer, Campbell, Marshall, Day, Jefferson, and Clark Aves., the Roanoke River, and 13th and 21st Sts. 37°16′08″N 79°57′20″W	
56	Villa Heights	Villa Heights	June 4, 2018 (#100002532)	2750 Hoover St. 37°17′33″N 79°58′44″W	
57	Virginia Can Company-S.H. Heironimus Warehouse	Virginia Can Company-S.H. Heironimus Warehouse	February 22, 2006 (#06000067)	315 Albemarle Ave., SE. 37°15′47″N 79°56′16″W	Built beside the Virginian Railway in 1912 to house Roanoke's first tin can company; later a clothing factory and then a department store warehouse
58	Virginian Railway Passenger Station	Virginian Railway Passenger Station	May 22, 2003 (#03000456)	1402 Jefferson St., SE. 37°15′35″N 79°56′28″W	
59	Wasena Historic District	Wasena Historic District	January 3, 2012 (#11000984)	Wiley Dr., Winchester, Winona, Wasena, Howbert, Valley, Hamilton, Kerns, Floyd, and Summit Aves., Brighton Rd. 37°15′48″N 79°57′36″W	

== Former listing ==
	Name on the Register	Image	Date listed	Date removed	Location	City or town	Description
1	First Baptist Church		December 6, 1990 (#90001840)	March 19, 2001	407 N. Jefferson Street	Roanoke	Destroyed by fire April 1995

== See also ==
- List of National Historic Landmarks in Virginia
- National Register of Historic Places listings in Virginia
- National Register of Historic Places listings in Roanoke County, Virginia
- National Register of Historic Places listings in Salem, Virginia
