= Fire Station No. 5 =

Fire Station No. 5, and variations such as Engine House No. 5, may refer to:

(ordered by U.S. state then city)

- Fire Station No. 5 (Mobile, Alabama)
- Fire Barn 5 (Elgin, Illinois), also known as "Fire Station 5"
- Engine House No. 5 (Columbus, Ohio)
- No. 5 Fire Station (Sandusky, Ohio)
- Fire Station No. 5 (Knoxville, Tennessee)
- Fire Station No. 5 (Roanoke, Virginia)
- Fire Station No. 5 (Tacoma, Washington)

== See also ==
- List of fire stations
