= English Gardens Apartments (Roanoke, Virginia) =

Historic apartment complex in Roanoke, Virginia, US

- U.S. National Register of Historic Places
- Virginia Landmarks Register
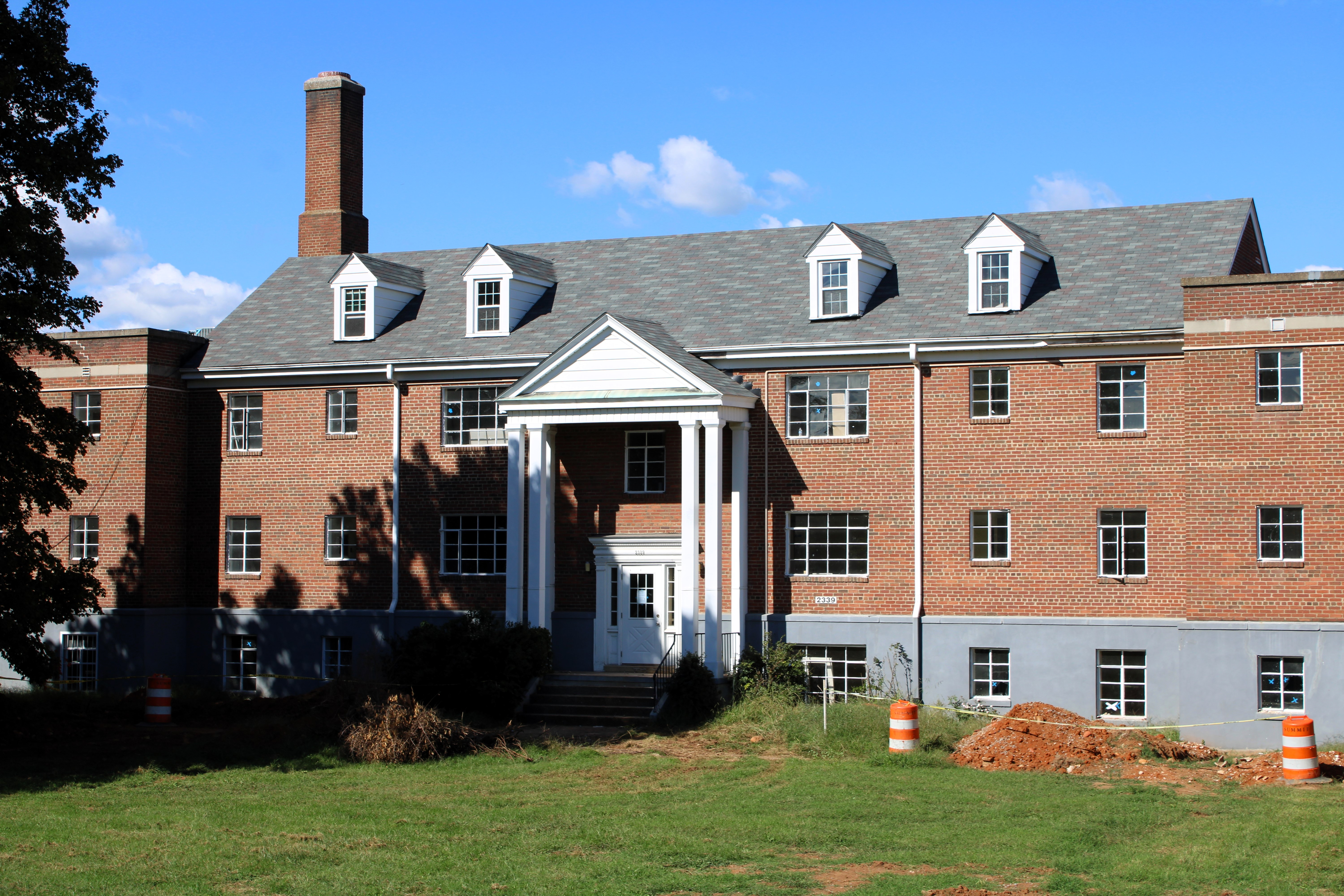
- The central English Gardens building in 2023

- Location within Virginia Location within the United States
- Location: 2325, 2331, 2333, 2339, 2343, 2345, 2349 Memorial Ave. SW, 1208, 1218, 1222 Fauquier St. SW, 2324, 2330, 2332, 2336, 2340, 2346, 2352 Denniston Ave. SW, Roanoke, Virginia
- Coordinates: 37°16′05″N 79°59′13″W
- Area: 3.85 acres (1.56 ha)
- Built: 1947, 1950
- Architect: E. Tucker Carlton
- Architectural style: Colonial Revival
- NRHP reference No.: 100008022
- VLR No.: 128-6476

Significant dates
- Added to NRHP: August 17, 2022
- Designated VLR: June 16, 2022

The English Gardens Apartments is a historic complex of apartment buildings located in Roanoke, Virginia. The complex was designed by the Richmond-based architect E. Tucker Carlton, and was built in two phases. The first, completed in 1947, consists of nine building of three stories each, while the second, finished in 1950, consists of eight buildings of two stories each. The complex was designed in the Colonial Revival style, and all buildings are constructed of concrete blocks fronted with brick.

The English Gardens was designed as a garden apartment complex, arranged to create courtyards between the buildings in order to maximize green space and ventilation. The Federal Housing Administration provided financing for the project, which was aimed primarily at middle-class World War II veterans and their families. The complex was listed to the National Register of Historic Places in 2022, and as of 2023 was in the process of reopening after a renovation.

== History ==
The Federal Housing Administration (FHA) was established in 1934 in an effort to provide affordable housing in the midst of the Great Depression. The agency would provide mortgage insurance in order to spur development by the private sector. To be eligible to receive FHA loans, developers had to adhere to a number of regulations, many of which were influenced by the ongoing garden city movement. For example, apartment buildings could not exceed three stories nor take up more than 25% of each acre of land, and density levels were to be kept low, with no more than four units to a floor.

The first major FHA-financed housing project was Colonial Village, built in 1935 in Arlington, Virginia. The development was a success, and was used thereafter as an example for future FHA complexes. The garden apartment complex became popular following World War II and the subsequent need for large-scale projects to accommodate returning veterans. The Roanoke native and Richmond-based architect E. Tucker Carlton designed many such developments in the Richmond area during the mid-1940s, including the National Register-listed Kent Road Village and Holly Springs Apartments. In Roanoke, Carlton built two FHA-financed projects: English Gardens in 1947 and 1950, and the since-demolished Carlton Terrace in 1950.

The first phase of construction on English Gardens consisted of nine buildings of four separate types, all designed in the Colonial Revival style. The building types are primarily distinguished by the roof type of each; some are gabled, some hipped, and some flat. The buildings hold a total of 52 apartments, 36 of which are two-bedroom units with the rest containing one bedroom. Each structure in this phase is three-storied, with laundry facilities and a boiler room on the ground floor and living spaces above. The buildings are constructed of concrete block with a common bond brick veneer. The façades are symmetrical, and consist of a centralized entrance and either a five- or seven-bay width. Many of the structures are built at right angles to each other, set back from the road, creating large courtyards with open green space.

The second phase, completed in 1950, consisted of eight two-story buildings, designed in three distinct types, and of a simpler style than the first phase. The eight structures contain a total of 32 apartments, all but eight of which are two-bedroom. All buildings are symmetrically faced with a five bay width, and of the same concrete block with brick veneer construction as phase one.

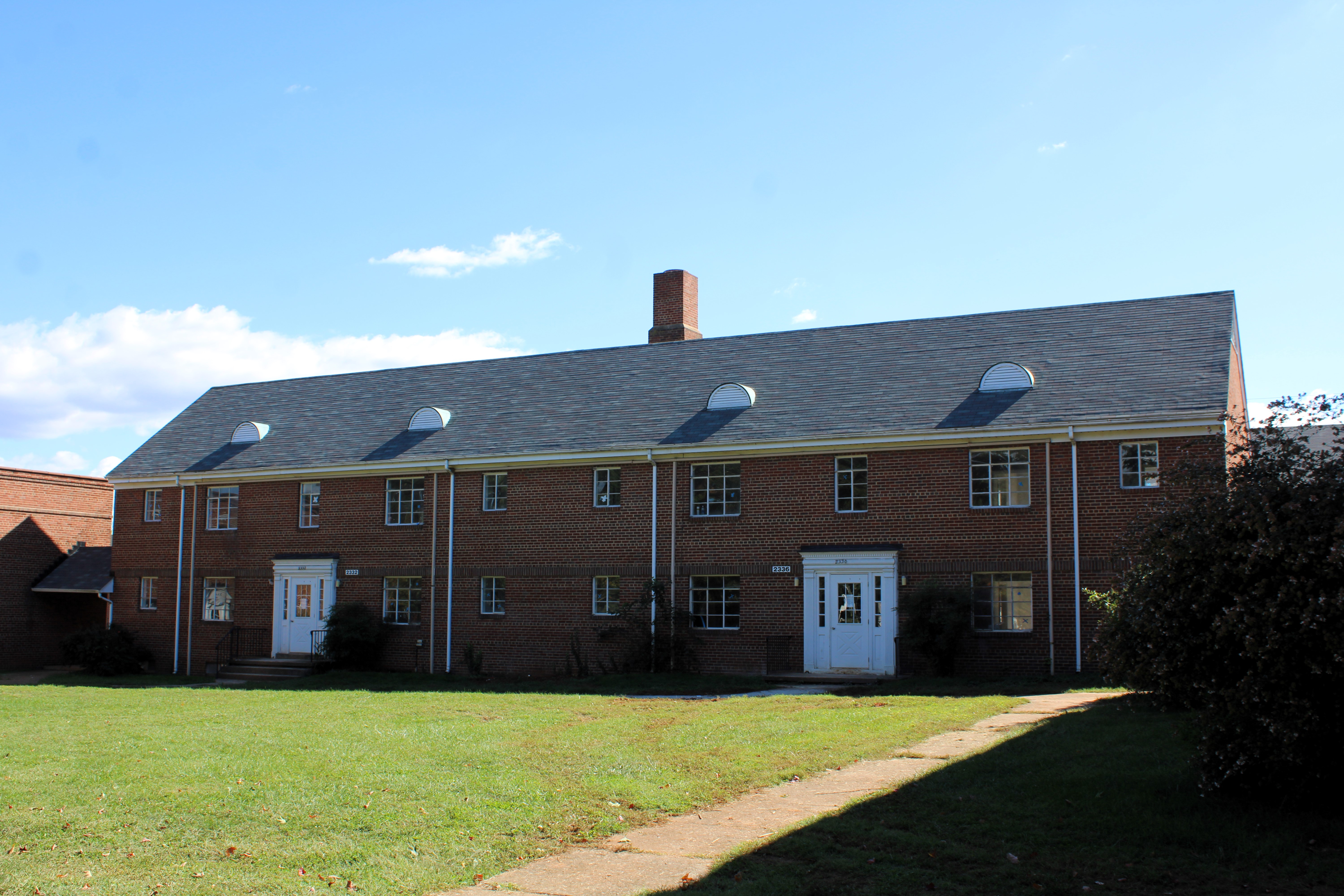
Buildings from the second phase of construction

Once completed, the English Gardens' 84 units made it the third largest FHA-insured development built in Roanoke after World War II, and the second largest to survive into the 21st century (the Roanoke Apartments, also constructed in 1950 only a mile away from English Gardens, was built with 225 units). Four additional buildings housing "cottage" apartments were added adjacent to the English Gardens site in the 1960s, but are not contributing structures to the historic complex.

The development was listed on the National Register of Historic Places in 2022. In that year, the apartments were sold for $3.53 million to an ownership group based out of nearby Salem. The new owners closed the complex for a planned renovation and required all residents – most of whom were on month-to-month leases – to vacate by the end of June of that year. A shortage of affordable housing made relocation difficult for many of the complex's tenants, and in July legal action was taken against eight residents still on the property. The development was renamed Gardens at Grandin, and in 2023 some of the renovated apartments reopened.
