= Roanoke River and Railroad Historic District =

Historic district in Virginia, United States

- U.S. National Register of Historic Places
- U.S. Historic district
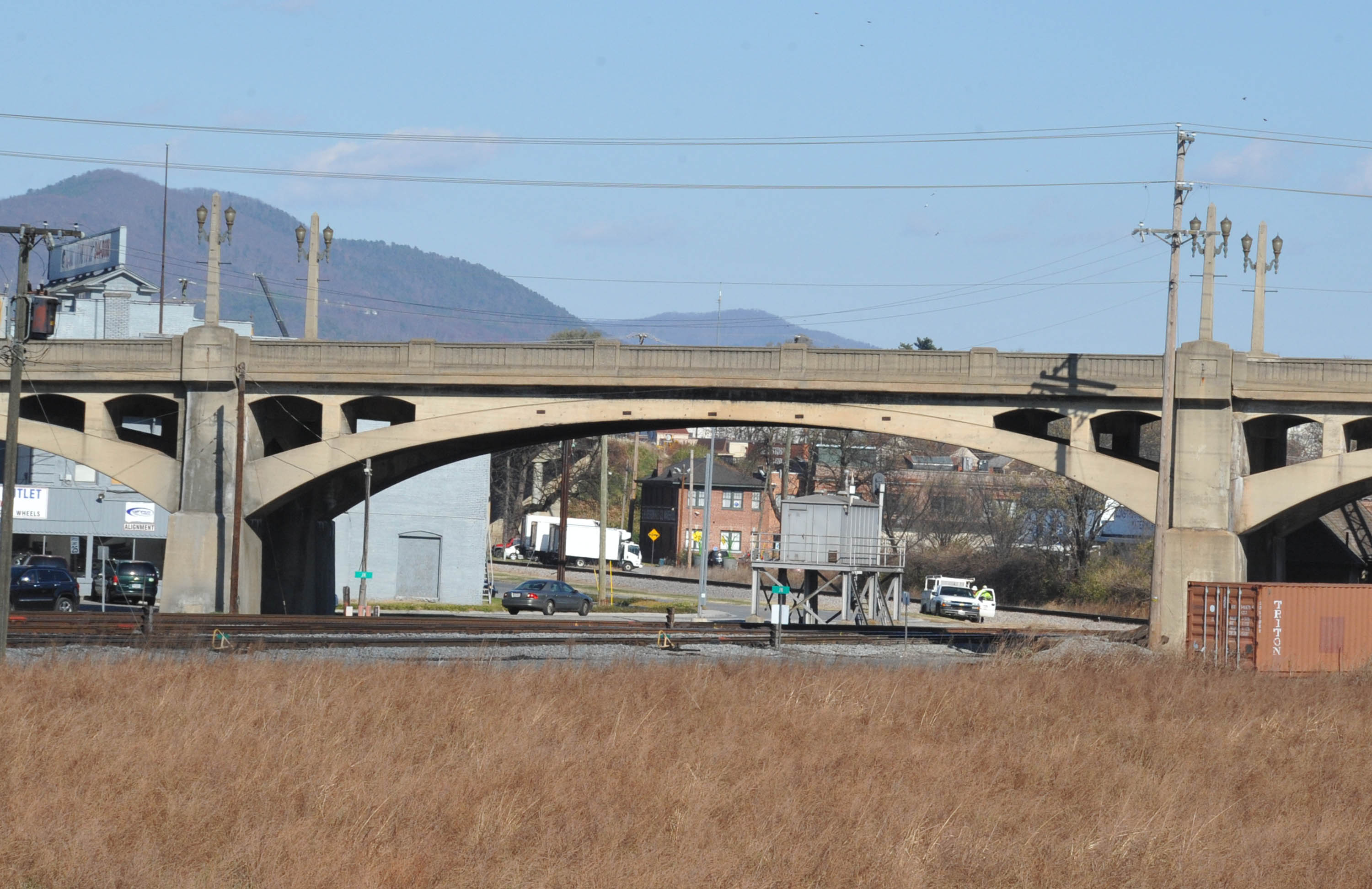

- Location within Virginia Location within the United States
- Location: Albemarle & Walnut Aves., SE., Williamson Rd., SE., 4th & Jefferson Sts., SE., Roanoke, Virginia
- Coordinates: 37.25865°N 79.940711°W
- Area: 47 acres (19 ha)
- Architect: Multiple
- NRHP reference No.: 13000994
- Added to NRHP: December 24, 2013

The Roanoke River and Railroad Historic District is a predominantly industrial area on the north side of the Roanoke River in Roanoke, Virginia. The area is bounded by South Jefferson Street on the west and the Roanoke River to the east, and extends north as far as Albemarle Avenue. The district's resources are defined primarily by their relationship to the railroad tracks that bisect this area. The area was developed in the late 19th and early 20th centuries with the completion of the Roanoke & Southern line in 1892 and the Virginian Railway line in 1909, and consists primarily of functional industrial buildings that were built between about 1900 and 1930, an example of which is the Virginia Can Company (built in 1912, listed on the National Register of Historic Places in 2006). Notable exceptions are the Virginian Railway Passenger Station, a Spanish Revival passenger station built 1909-10 and listed on the National Register of Historic Places since 2003, and the Walnut Street and Jefferson Street bridges, completed in 1927 and 1928, respectively. Both bridges were constructed in the Art Deco style and designed with "Egyptian Babylonian" style decorations.

Many of the former industrial buildings located in the district have been demolished as part of a city-led redevelopment plan. Sixteen remaining structures contribute to the historic district, which was listed on the National Register of Historic Places in 2013.

== See also ==
- National Register of Historic Places listings in Roanoke, Virginia
