= Belmont Historic District (Roanoke, Virginia) =

Historic district in Roanoke, Virginia, US

- U.S. National Register of Historic Places
- U.S. Historic district
- Virginia Landmarks Register
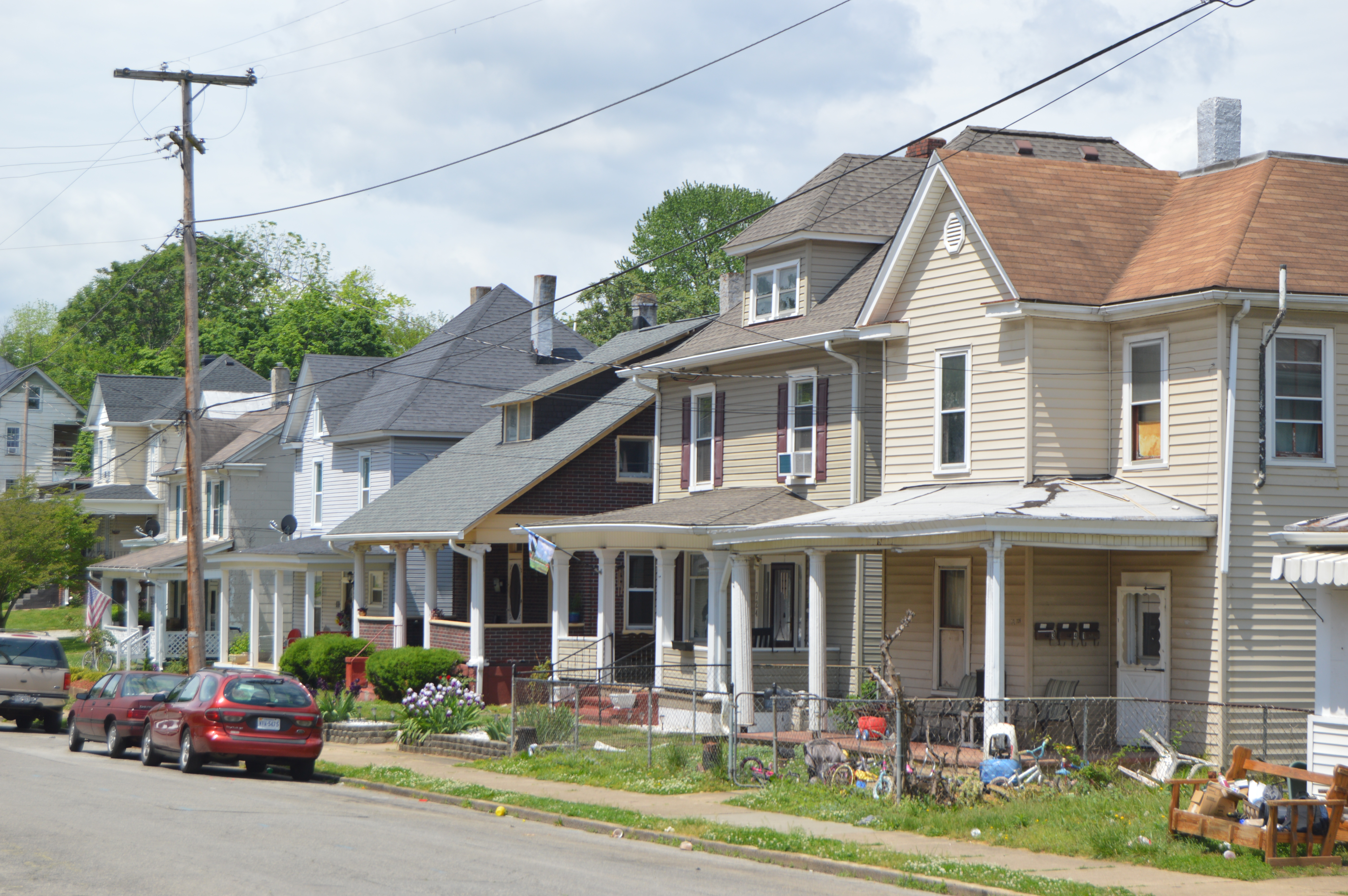
- Stewart St. in the Belmont Historic District in 2019

- Location within Virginia Location within the United States
- Location: Albemarle, Bullitt, Elm, Jamison, Dale, Campbell, Cedar Bluff, Church, Highland, Mountain, Stewart, Tazewell, and White Aves., SE., and 4th-11th Sts., SE., Roanoke, Virginia
- Coordinates: 37°16′12″N 79°55′45″W
- Area: 214 acres (87 ha)
- Built: 1888–1958
- Architectural style: Queen Anne, Colonial Revival, Classical Revival, Bungalow, Commercial style
- NRHP reference No.: 100003618
- VLR No.: 128-5191

Significant dates
- Added to NRHP: April 15, 2019
- Designated VLR: December 13, 2018

The Belmont Historic District is located in the southeast section of Roanoke, Virginia, US. It consists of an irregularly-shaped 214 acres (87 ha) of primarily residential housing located to the east of the city's downtown and south of the Roanoke Shops.

The district's history coincides largely with that of Roanoke City's industry. Its original housing served the employees of the recently arrived Norfolk and Western Railway beginning in 1888. Later development in the district was built to provide housing for workers at the American Viscose Plant after that mill opened in 1917. The district includes a wide range of architectural styles among its 809 contributing structures. Located within the district are three buildings previously listed on the National Register of Historic Places, and the district itself was listed to the Register in 2019.

== Geography ==
The district's northern boundary is marked by Campbell Avenue, which itself separates the historic district from the railroad and railway shops where many of its residents were employed in the early 20th century. While the majority of contributing structures in the district are residential and commercial, there are some small industrial buildings along Campbell Avenue in this section. The western boundary is formed by Interstate 581, which upon its completion in the mid-1960s created a barrier between the historic district and the commercial center of town with which it had once blended. Albemarle Avenue and 11th Street make up the southern and eastern boundaries, respectively.

Primary thoroughfares in the district include Campbell, Bullitt, and Jamison Avenues running east–west and 9th Street traveling north–south. Most contributing commercial buildings in the district are located along these roads and their intersections. The topography of the area is varied, with differences of over 100 feet (30 m) of elevation in its lowest and highest points creating some steep roads and residential lots.

== History ==
In the early 1880s, the small town of Big Lick experienced a population boom following its selection as the headquarters of the Norfolk and Western Railway (N&W). The town became the City of Roanoke in 1884. The city was in need of housing for the many N&W employees moving to the area, and in 1888, Mortimer M. Rogers, son-in-law of the early Roanoke Valley settler George Plater Tayloe, sold a portion of the family's Buena Vista estate to the Belmont Land Company. That company platted the land and laid out streets, which were often named for officers of the land company and railroad. Streetcar access was extended to the neighborhood in 1905.

The majority of the houses in the district were built within the first two decades of its existence. The earliest, generally closest to the railroad, were typically single-family homes of frame construction in the Folk Victorian style, though some higher ranked N&W employees built grander homes of Queen Anne and Colonial Revival. The 1917 opening of the American Viscose Plant on the southern end of 9th Street brought a second wave of construction to the district. These houses were often built as infill on vacant lots and were primarily of the American Foursquare and American Craftsman styles.

The Belmont neighborhood was nearly the location of the city's first public park. In the early 1880s, the Roanoke Land and Improvement Company donated a tract of land between Campbell and Tazewell Avenues and 4th and 8th Streets, with the stipulation that the city fence it in and maintain it as a park. The city failed to construct the fence, however, causing the 60 acres (24 ha) to revert to the land company. The area, called Woodland Park, continued to be used for park purposes, and Roanoke Land and Improvement had a pavilion built on the site. It was also the location of a water holding tank intended for fire fighting at the railway shops below. Water was fed by gravity north from Crystal Spring and then pumped into the holding tank on the hill. After N&W ceased its use of the water tank in 1889, the land was sold in 1890 to developers. The city objected when building permits were filed for the tract, not having realized it no longer owned the property. Local residents were angered at the loss of the recreation space, and it was 1902 before the city officially opened its first municipal park.

The district includes a number of churches that date to its period of historical significance, including the Belmont Methodist-Episcopal Church. This Gothic Revival structure was built between 1917 and 1921 and was listed to the National Register of Historic Places in 2011. Other notable buildings in the district include the H. L. Lawson & Son Warehouse, a 1925 Campbell Avenue structure that was listed to the Register in 2008, as well as the Roanoke City Firehouse No. 6. The firehouse dates to 1911 and was one of three in the city that opened on the same day and were designed to resemble an American Foursquare home in order to blend into their residential surroundings.

The period of significance for the district ends in 1958. In that year two impactful events occurred that had a long-lasting negative effect on both the neighborhood and the city at large. First, the American Viscose Plant, which had largely been supplanted in use by newer factories, permanently closed its doors, resulting in the loss of nearly 2,000 jobs. Additionally, N&W converted its entire fleet from steam power to diesel, which resulted in another 2,000 jobs lost in the city. The two occurrences, combined with the mid-1960s construction of Interstate 581 on the western edge of the neighborhood, initiated a decades-long aging and loss of population in the district.

The area was faced with another potential crisis at the turn of the 21st century, when the Virginia Department of Transportation determined that the path of the planned Interstate 73 would also run through the district. Historic preservationists fought for and won the re-routing of the highway away from the district. The Virginia interstate 73 project was subsequently deemed a low priority 2019, before being terminated completely in 2024.

The district was officially listed on the National Register of Historic Places in 2019.

== Gallery ==
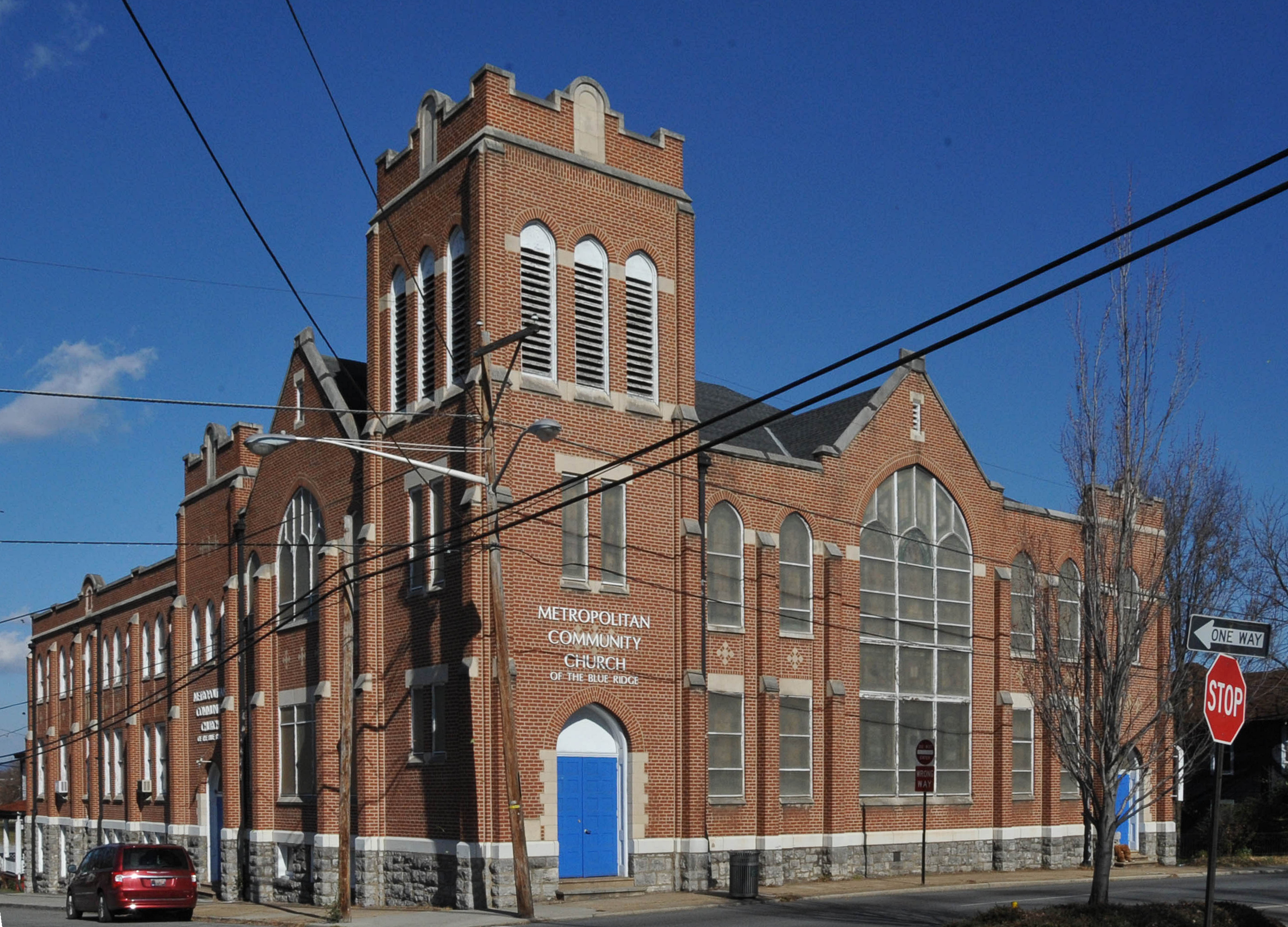
Belmont Methodist-Episcopal Church

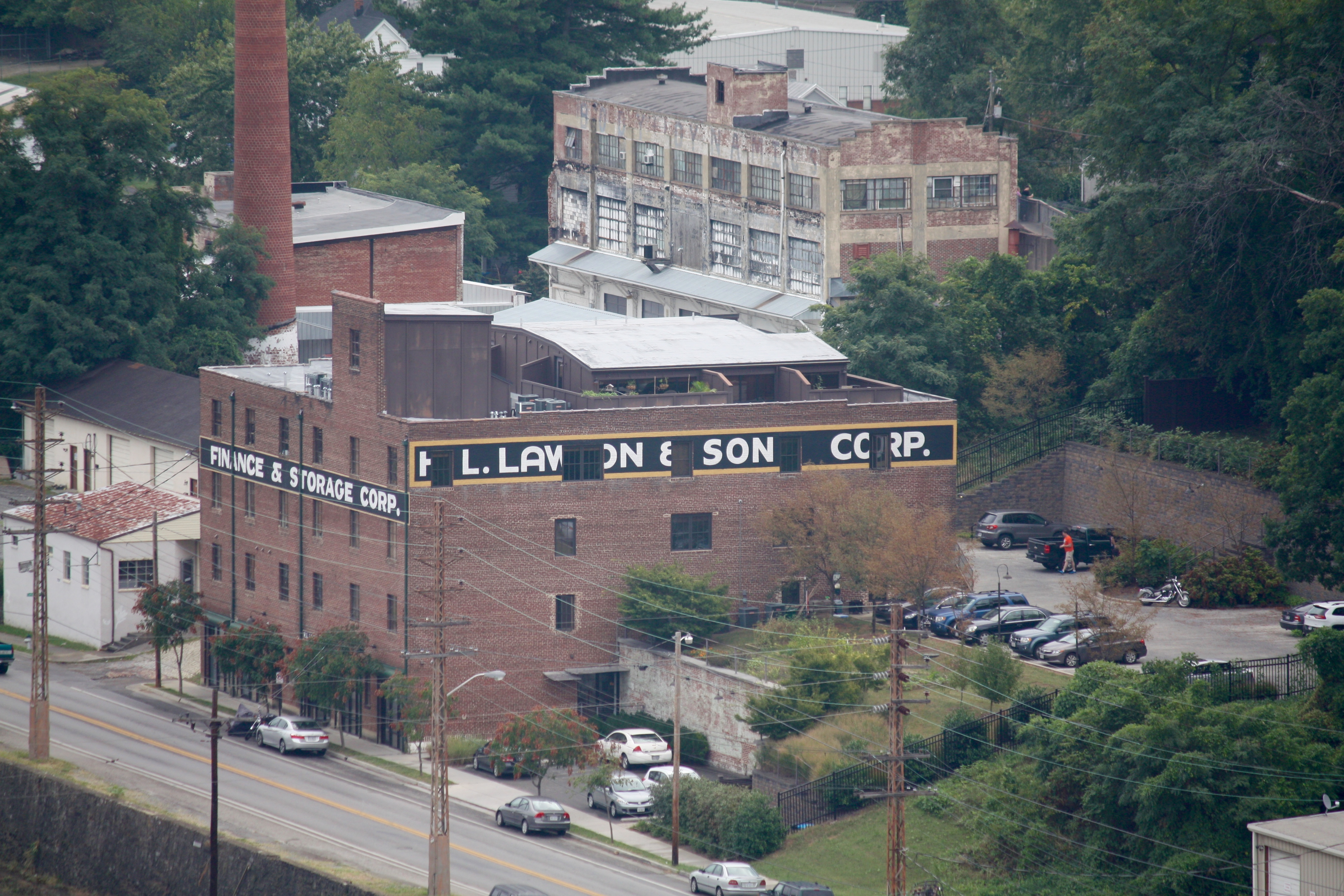
The H.L. Lawson & Son Warehouse as viewed from the top of the Wells Fargo Tower

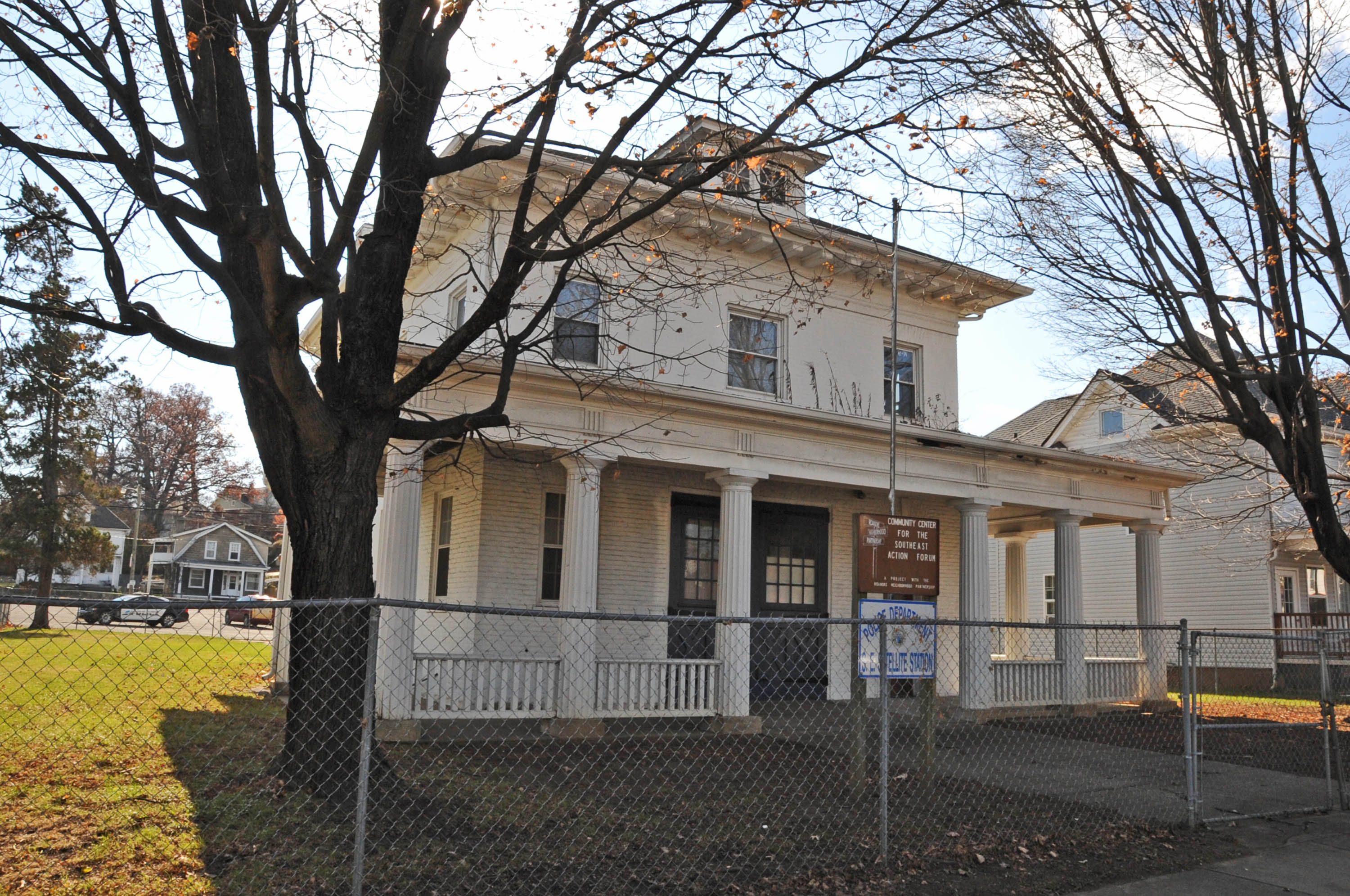
Roanoke City Firehouse No. 6

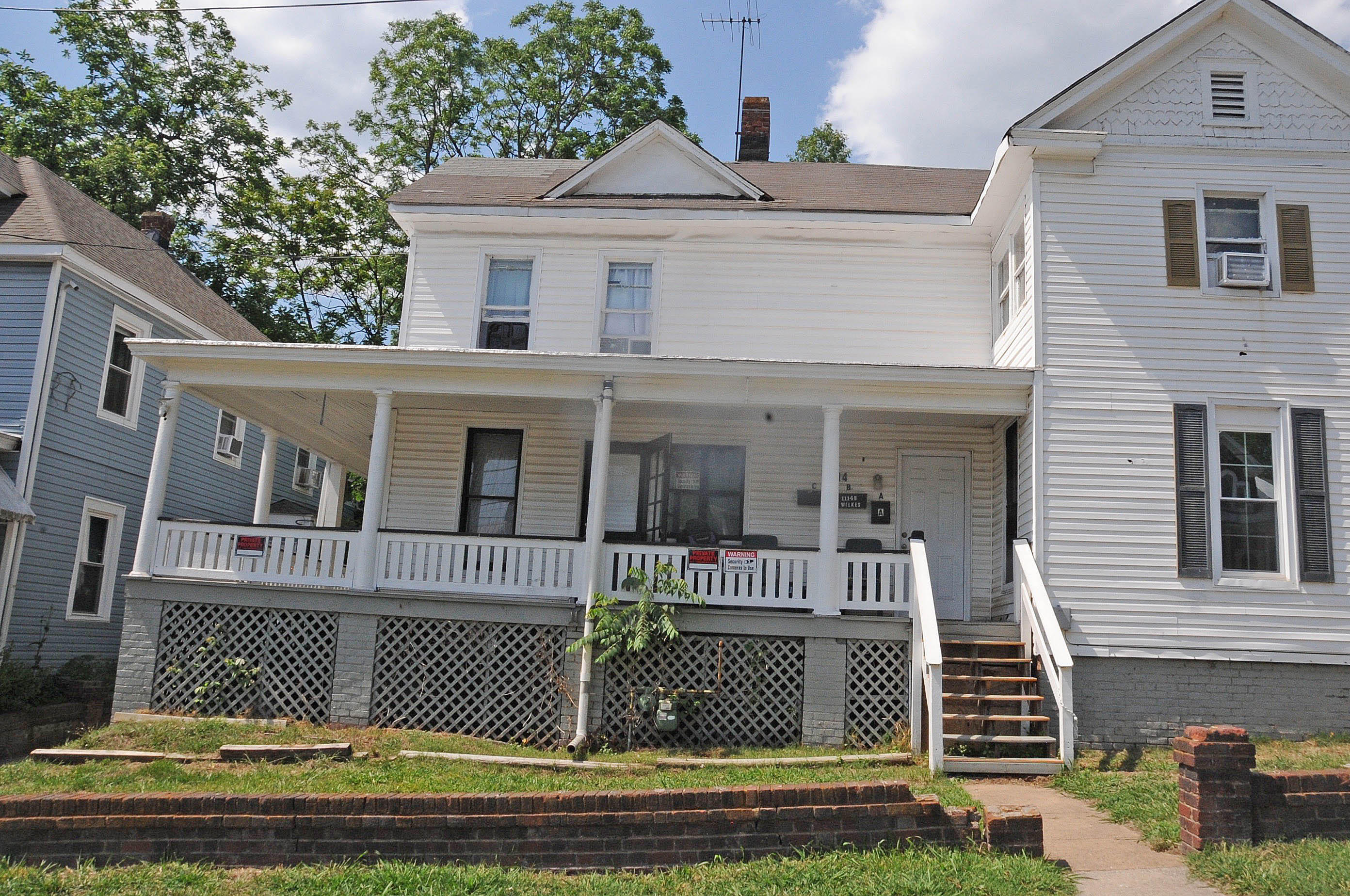
1114 Stewart Ave. SE
