= Roanoke City Health Center =

- U.S. National Register of Historic Places
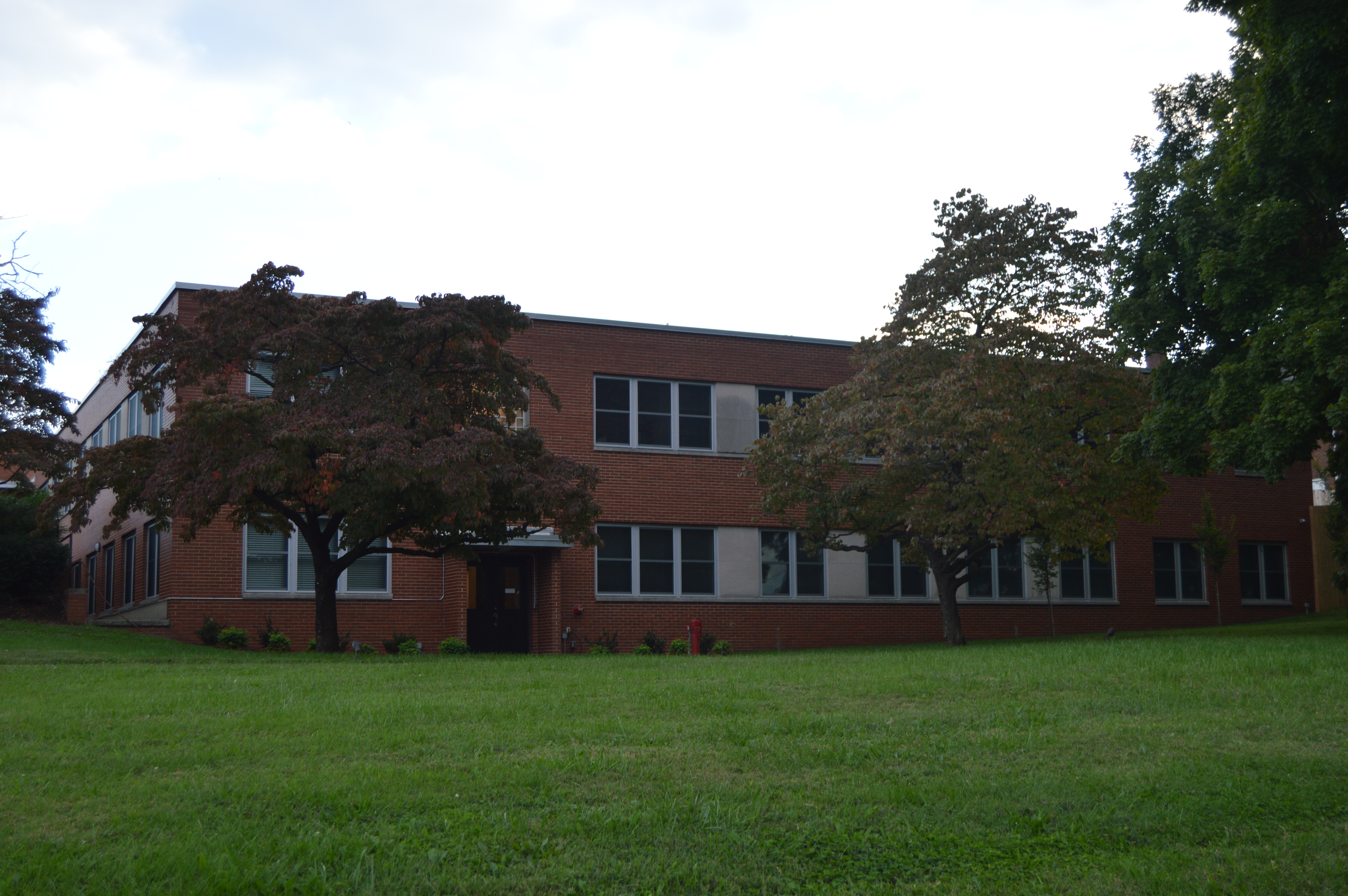

- Location within Virginia Location within the United States
- Location: 515 8th St., SW., Roanoke, Virginia
- Coordinates: 37°16′14″N 79°57′21″W
- Area: 1.73 acres (0.70 ha)
- Built: 1951
- Architectural style: International
- NRHP reference No.: 16000263
- Added to NRHP: May 12, 2016

The Roanoke City Health Center is a historic health care facility at 515 8th Street SW in Roanoke, Virginia. It is a modest single-story brick building in a U-shaped plan. It was built in 1951, and exemplifies trends of the period in the provision of health care to rural communities. It also exhibits features distinctive to the Jim Crow era of segregated facilities, as it was originally designed with separate areas for whites and African Americans.

The building, now vacant, was listed on the National Register of Historic Places in 2016.

== See also ==
- National Register of Historic Places listings in Roanoke, Virginia
