= Riverland Historic District =

Historic district in Virginia, United States

- U.S. National Register of Historic Places
- U.S. Historic district
- Virginia Landmarks Register
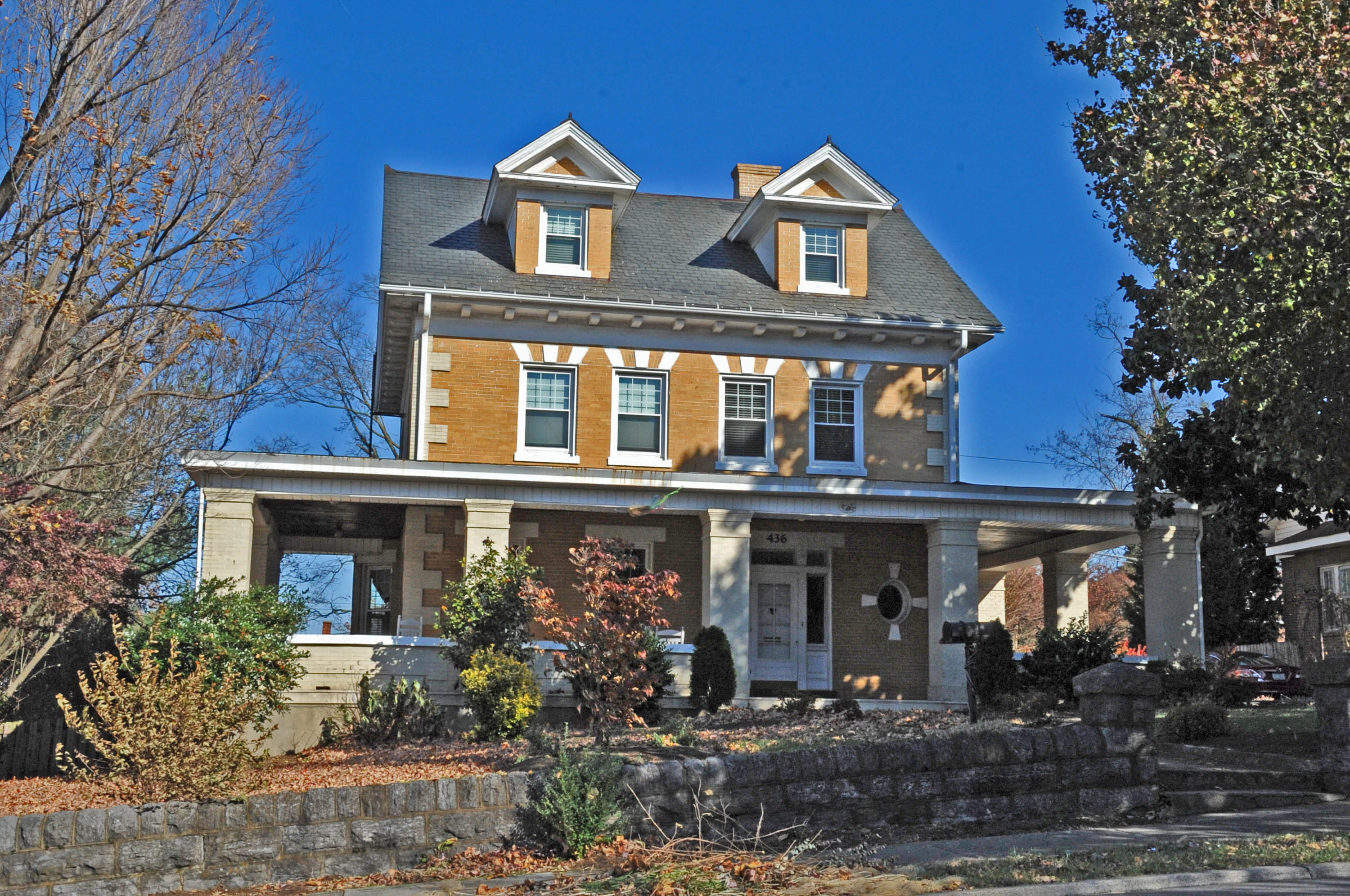

- Location within Virginia Location within the United States
- Location: Laural, Primrose, Whitman & Ivy Sts., Riverland Rd., Walnut & Arbutus Aves., Roanoke, Virginia
- Coordinates: 37.258462°N 79.934145°W
- Area: 42 acres (17 ha)
- Architect: Multiple
- NRHP reference No.: 13000646
- VLR No.: 128-5476

Significant dates
- Added to NRHP: August 27, 2013
- Designated VLR: June 19, 2013

The Riverland Historic District encompasses an early 20th century neighborhood on the south side of the Roanoke River in Roanoke, Virginia. The area consists of a portion of the residential area bounded on the south by Walnut Avenue SE, on the east by Arbutus Avenue SE, and on other sides by the river. Most of the included properties are either on Arbutus Avenue or Riverland Street, with some also on Piedmont Street and Walnut Avenue. The neighborhood is one of closely spaced residential properties built to provide housing for workers in nearby businesses. It was developed by the Highland Land Company, and was mostly built out between 1900 and 1930.

The district was listed on the National Register of Historic Places in 2013.

== See also ==
- National Register of Historic Places listings in Roanoke, Virginia
