= Fishburn Park Keeper's Cottage =

Historic building in Virginia, US

- U.S. National Register of Historic Places
- Virginia Landmarks Register
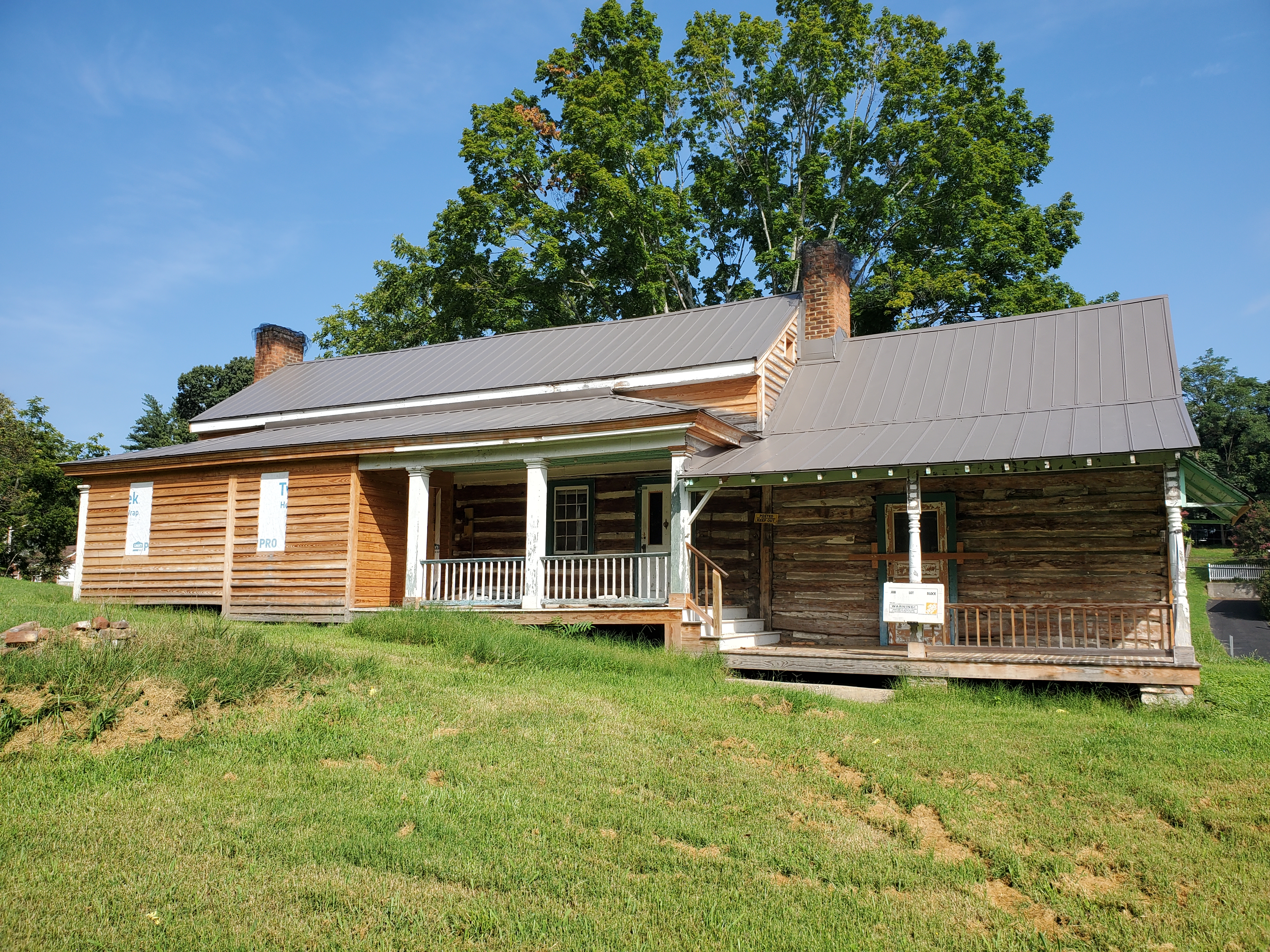
- Fishburn Park Keeper's Cottage in 2026

- Location within Virginia Location within the United States
- Location: 2424 Brambleton Ave, SW, Roanoke, Virginia
- Coordinates: 37°14′49″N 79°58′58″W
- Area: 1.1 acres (0.45 ha)
- Built: c. 1820
- Architect: Unknown
- NRHP reference No.: 100013230
- VLR No.: 128-6477

Significant dates
- Added to NRHP: July 17, 2026
- Designated VLR: March 19, 2026

Fishburn Park Keeper's Cottage is a historic building located in Roanoke, Virginia, United States. It was constructed in stages beginning in c. 1820, making it possibly the oldest building still standing in Roanoke City. It is also a rare example of combined hewn-log and timber-frame construction in Southwest Virginia. The building was privately owned for approximately a century before coming under city ownership, and for much of the 20th century was used as a park caretaker's cottage by two generations of the same family. After sitting unoccupied for several decades, the house and a portion of the surrounding parkland were involved in controversial attempts by the city to sell them to private owners. The cottage was listed to the National Register of Historic Places in 2026, and as of that year was in the process of restoration into a coffee shop.

== Description ==
The cottage consists of multiple sections that were constructed in five separate phases over time. The original structure is a 19-by-16-foot (5.8 m × 4.9 m) hewn-log pen, likely built c. 1820, with a nearly-identical pen built shortly thereafter and separated from the first by a chimney. A timber-frame addition was built on the building's west end prior to 1850 and possibly a decade or more earlier. This addition incorporated an exterior chimney, and is the only section of the house to include a basement. A one-room frame addition was built on the south side of the timber-frame section later in the 19th century, and a two-part porch on the building's south facade completed the structure, which in total measures approximately 60 by 26 feet (18.3 m × 7.9 m). The cottage faces south, away from the modern roadway, as a street formerly cut in front of it through what is currently parkland. It is possibly the oldest building still standing in Roanoke City, and is one of very few examples of combined hewn-log and timber-frame houses in Southwest Virginia.

== History ==
The keeper's cottage predates the surrounding land's use as a public park. The land that would become Fishburn Park was owned beginning in 1825 by a James Crawford Thompson, who likely added to the house, but it is believed that the original structure existed prior to his ownership. Thompson owned the land into the 20th century, but by 1925 it had been purchased by a Roanoke land development company called the Weaver Heights Corporation. In that year the city purchased 15.5 acres (6.3 ha) from the company, including the land on which the cottage sat.

The house first saw use as a caretaker's cottage beginning in 1926. In January of that year, John Henry Blackwell began work as the first caretaker of what was then Weaver Park. Blackwell had worked for the Weaver Heights company as a laborer since the previous year. In 1935, a Roanoke landowner named Blair J. Fishburn donated to the city over 27 acres (11 ha) of land adjacent to Weaver Park. The city renamed the entire tract Fishburn Park, which now covered 43 acres (17 ha) in southwestern Roanoke. Blackwell remained on as caretaker for the newly-expanded park and worked in that capacity until dying in 1948.

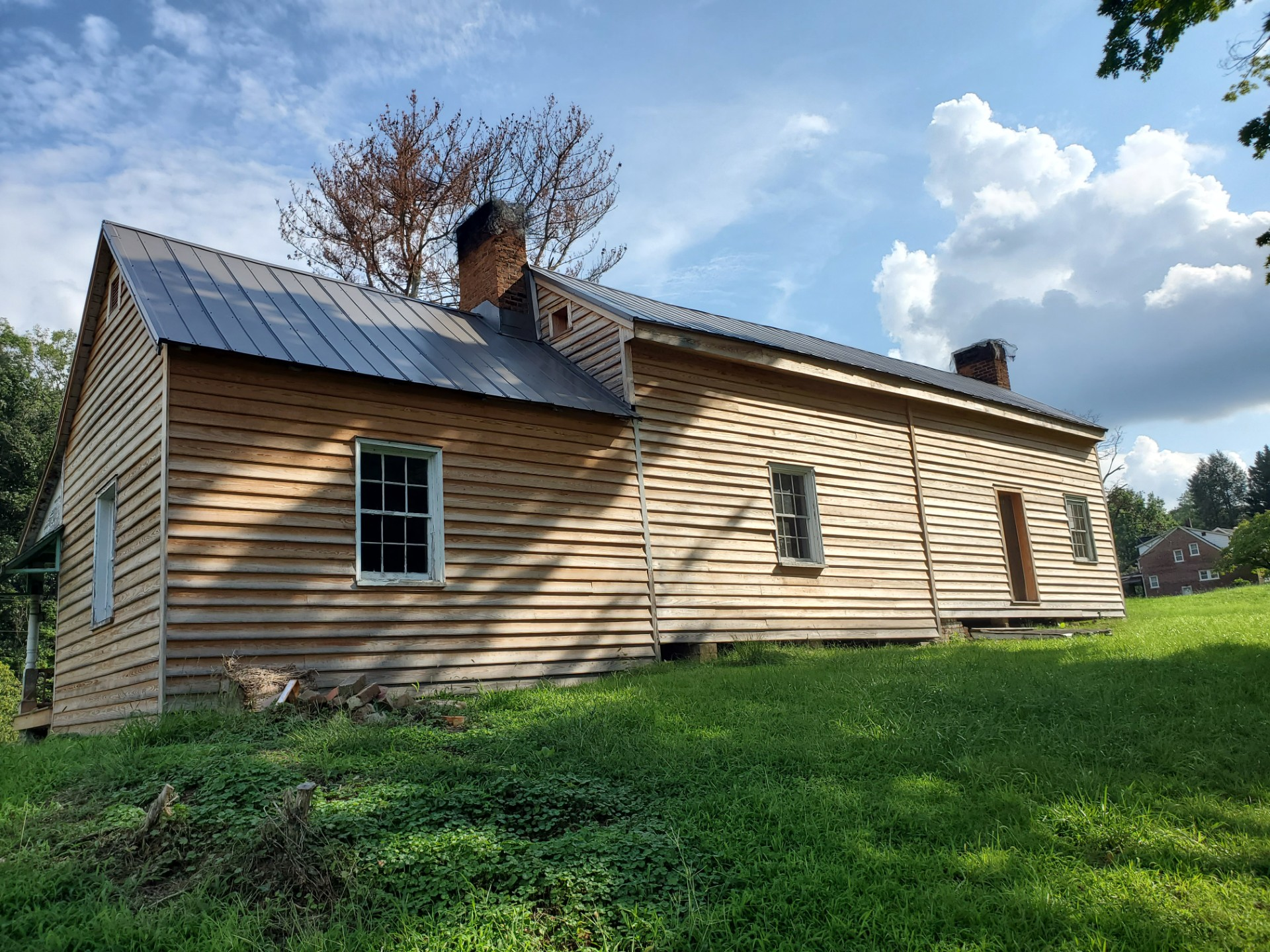
Rear view of the cottage

Blackwell was succeeded as park caretaker by his son, George, who had lived in the cottage since his father began his position in 1926. George made improvements to the house, including some he had to pay for himself. As originally constructed, the structure's two log pens were not connected indoors; one had to exit to the porch in order to walk from the building's living room to its kitchen. George created a doorway between the two rooms, and a bathroom was also added in the mid-20th century where the property previously only had access to an outhouse. George was eventually made a supervisor for the city's parks department but still lived rent-free in the Fishburn Park cottage. Health problems caused him to retire in 1989, but the city allowed him to continue living in the house for a payment of $300 per month. By the time of George's retirement, he and his father had resided in and cared for the park for a combined 63 years.

Following the two generations of Blackwells' use of the cottage, the building sat unoccupied for years. In 2017, the city listed the property for sale along with 1.4 acres (0.57 ha) of adjoining land. The decision was controversial, with a local neighborhood association opposing the potential sale. Later that year the city entered into a contract with a local architect, Lora Katz, for the house's purchase, though by now the acreage for sale had been reduced to .75 acres (0.30 ha). Katz was to pay just $10 for the house and land but was required to invest at least $135,000 in its restoration. However, after further inspection of the property, Katz backed out of the contract following an estimation that the building's restoration would cost $200,000.

It was announced in 2022 that the property had a new potential buyer. Roanoke natives Keri and Justin vanBlaricom proposed a similar deal as the one Katz had canceled, though now $150,000 would need to be invested in the restoration and this time the property would be turned into a coffee shop (named "Fishburn Perk") rather than a private residence. Despite similar resistance from the same neighborhood association, in December of that year the city council voted 6–1 in favor of the plan. On May 8, 2023, the city's planning commission voted unanimously to recommend the vanBlaricoms' rezoning application for the property be approved, but on May 16 the city council voted 6–1 against the application, with one councilperson writing, "It is not acceptable to give away public land to facilitate a business deal because the commercial interests otherwise lack the resources or ability to finance the project."

Later in 2023, members of the local neighborhood association voted out of leadership the two most vocal opponents to the sale of the keeper's cottage. City council allowed an extension of the vanBlaricoms' application deadline, and in August voted 6–0 to approve an amended proposal. Under the new agreement, the city was awarded the right to purchase the property back if the vanBlaricoms decided to sell, and the new owners were allowed an exit from the deal should the house be determined too dilapidated to renovate. In March 2026, city council allowed an extension on the project's completion deadline to March 2027, and later that month the property was listed on the Virginia Landmarks Register. It was listed on the National Register of Historic Places in July 2026.

== See also ==
- National Register of Historic Places listings in Roanoke, Virginia
