= H. L. Lawson & Son Warehouse =

- U.S. National Register of Historic Places
- Virginia Landmarks Register
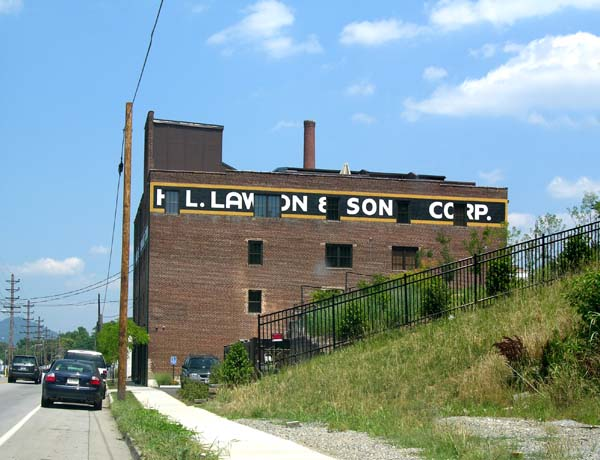
- H. L. Lawson & Son Warehouse, June 2010

- Location within Virginia Location within the United States
- Location: 631 Campbell Ave. SE., Roanoke, Virginia
- Coordinates: 37°16′20″N 79°56′0″W
- Area: less than one acre
- Built: 1925
- Architect: Eubank, Beaufort N.; Caldwell, James A.W.
- Architectural style: Early Commercial
- NRHP reference No.: 08000830
- VLR No.: 128-5191-0006

Significant dates
- Added to NRHP: September 5, 2008
- Designated VLR: June 19, 2008

H. L. Lawson & Son Warehouse is a historic warehouse building located at Roanoke, Virginia. It was built in 1925, and is a four-story, utilitarian brick building. The banked site allowed for the unloading of freight from railcars directly into the third story of the warehouse. It was built by Harry Leland Lawson, a key figure in Roanoke's business community from the late 1910s to the 1940s.

It was listed on the National Register of Historic Places (NRHP) in 2008. Since 2019, it has also been a contributing structure to the NRHP-listed Belmont Historic District.
