= Salvation Army Citadel (Roanoke, Virginia) =

Historic religious building in Roanoke, Virginia, US

- U.S. National Register of Historic Places
- Virginia Landmarks Register
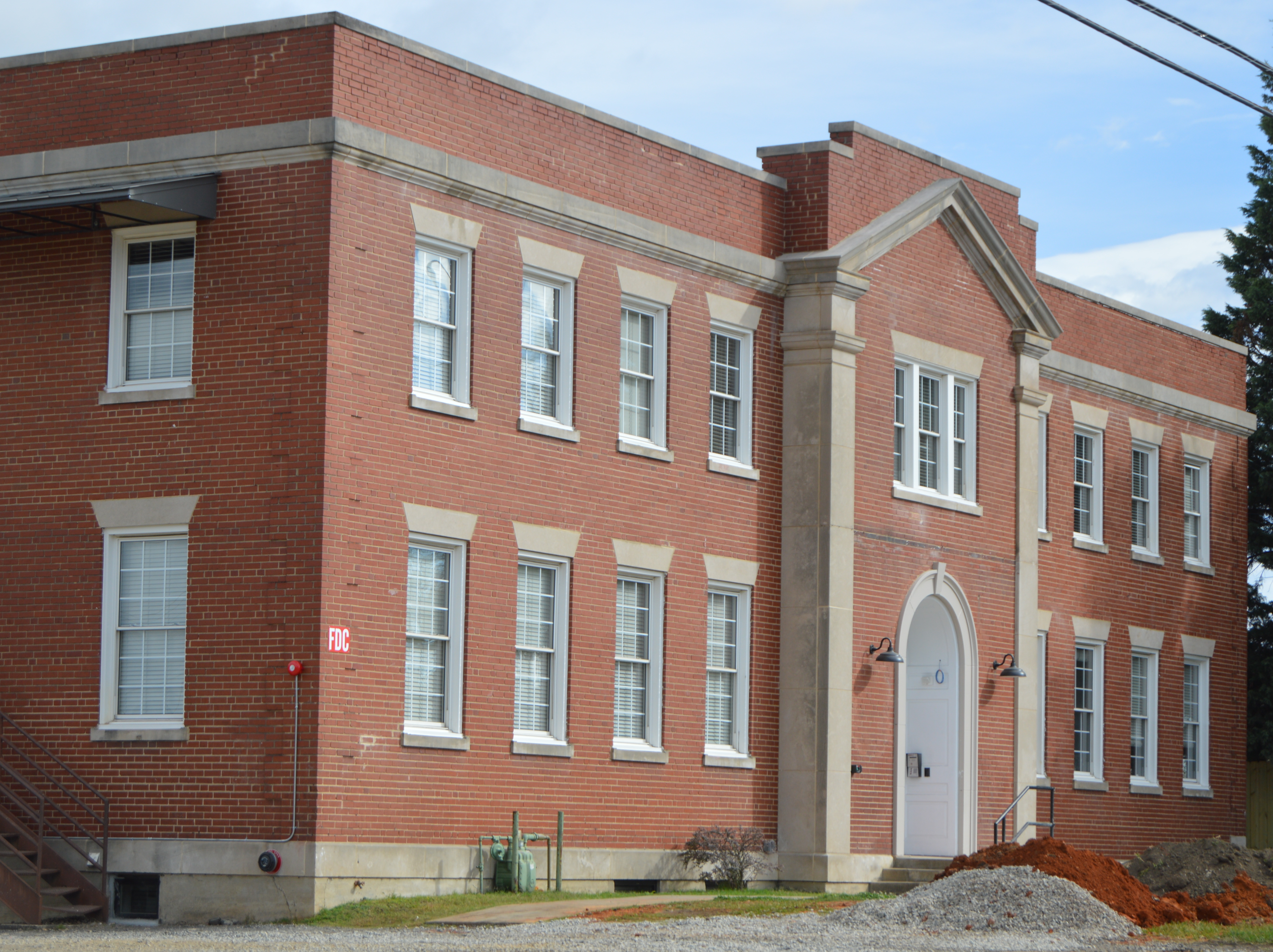
- Salvation Army Citadel in 2020

- Location within Virginia Location within the United States
- Location: 821 Salem Avenue, SW, Roanoke, Virginia
- Coordinates: 37°16′25″N 79°57′23″W
- Area: 1.03 acres (0.42 ha)
- Built: 1941
- Architect: Eubank & Caldwell
- Architectural style: Colonial Revival
- NRHP reference No.: 100008648
- VLR No.: 128-5343

Significant dates
- Added to NRHP: August 7, 2020
- Designated VLR: June 18, 2020

The Salvation Army Citadel is a historic religious building in Roanoke, Virginia. Built in 1941 in the Colonial Revival style, the site was the headquarters for the Salvation Army's operations in Roanoke, including church services, social services, and outreach. After the church constructed a new primary location in 1980, the building served as the Red Shield Lodge, a men's homeless shelter, until closing in 2018. It was listed on the National Register of Historic Places in 2020, and reopened that year as an apartment building.

== History ==
The Salvation Army began operations in Roanoke in 1884. The institution aimed many of its resources toward reaching poor and disadvantaged citizens, often foregoing traditional church buildings in favor of evangelizing in the streets and in commercial establishments. The church did have various physical locations in the city during the late-19th and early-20th centuries, including a former Salem Avenue saloon purchased in 1916 for $37,000. The organization remained in that building until 1941, when it was sold and work began on a new headquarters ("citadel") farther west on the same street. A fundraising drive provided $20,000 of the eventual $50,000 cost for the new location.

Roanoke's vice-mayor laid the site's cornerstone in a May 4 ceremony. The building's architect was Eubank and Caldwell, a local firm responsible for at least eight other locations eventually listed on the National Register of Historic Places. The citadel was designed in the Colonial Revival style; a two-story block with basement occupies the property's southern end and a gymnasium the northern. The exterior is concrete with a red brick veneer done in Flemish bond. The southern façade is symmetrical, and features a pair of cut stone pilasters to either side of a recessed entrance.

The citadel's interior featured a space used as both an auditorium and chapel on the first floor, while the second included classrooms as well as an office for the church's commanding officer and an apartment for the assistant officer. The gymnasium's walls are made of painted concrete, and its floor is maple and was installed with the tongue and groove method.

More than 700 people attended the citadel's dedication on October 12, 1941. The church soon began offering services in the building, including home economics, lodging for women, preschool programs, and food and clothing drives for the needy. A 1941 Christmas drive provided care packages to over 250 Roanoke-area families.

In 1948, Roanoke's mayor presided over the church's mortgage burning ceremony in honor of completing its final payment on the citadel. By 1951 the local chapter had 250 members and an annual budget of over $40,000.

The citadel served as the church's headquarters in Roanoke until 1980, when the organization spent $1.3 million to obtain and renovate a former elementary school located in the southeast portion of the city. The remainder of its $2 million fundraising drive was spent renovating the former headquarters on Salem Avenue. The citadel was redeveloped into the Red Shield Lodge, a shelter for homeless men. Its chapel became a 50-bed dormitory, and the second floor held 12 beds for men transitioning out of the shelter. The building operated in this fashion until 2018, when declining use made the Salvation Army decide to close the shelter. While it was initially intended to be razed, a local developer purchased the property in 2019. The site was listed on the National Register of Historic Places in 2020, and later that year reopened as apartments and retail space.
