= Belmont Methodist-Episcopal Church =

Historic church in Virginia, United States

- U.S. National Register of Historic Places
- Virginia Landmarks Register
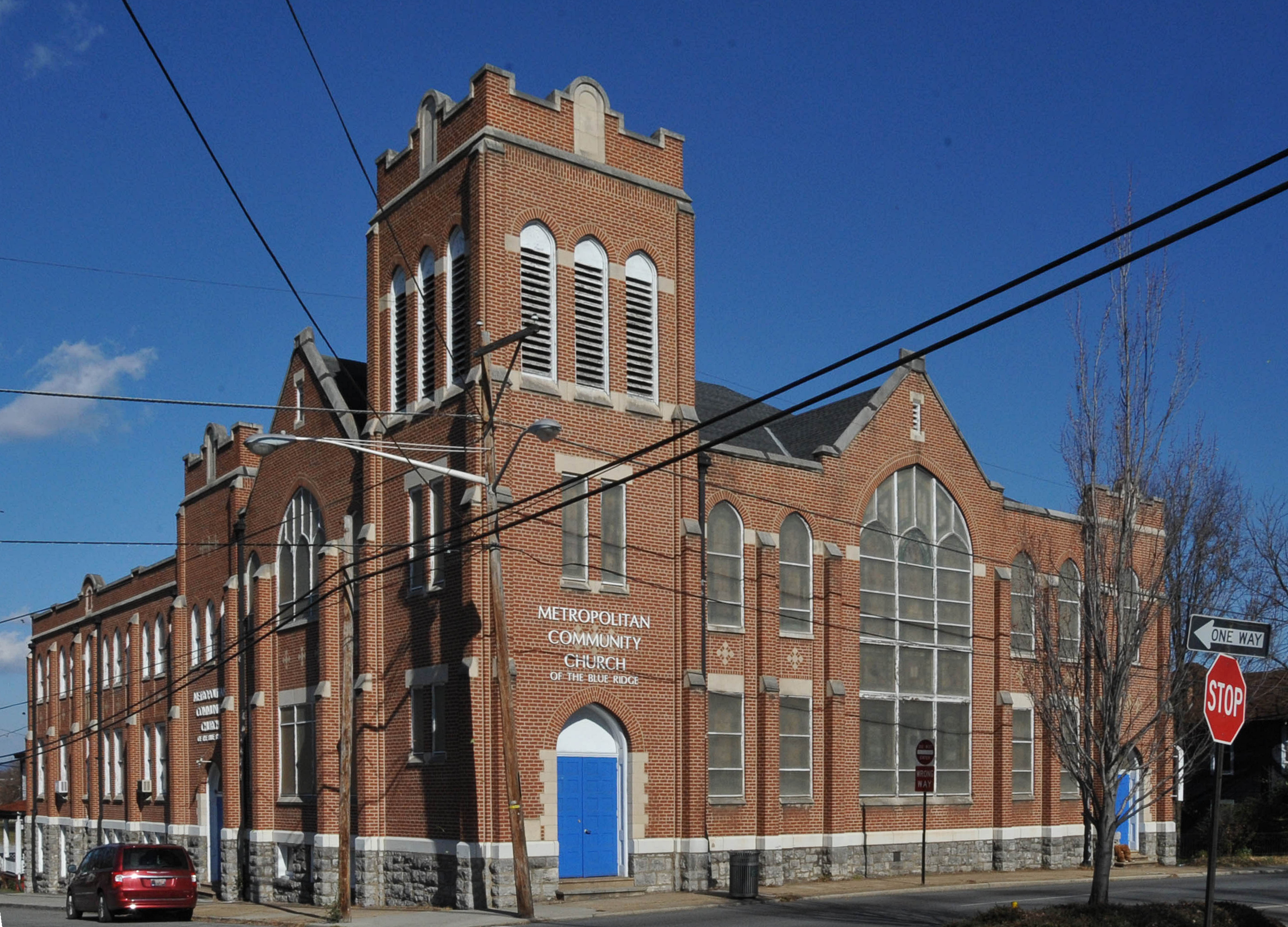
- Belmont Methodist-Episcopal Church in 2014

- Location within Virginia Location within the United States
- Location: 806 Jamison Ave., SE, Roanoke, Virginia
- Coordinates: 37°16′08″N 79°55′47″W
- Area: .238 acres (0.096 ha)
- Built: 1917-1921
- Built by: Clemmer, John L.
- Architect: Cain, Herbert L., Miller, Homer M.
- Architectural style: Late Gothic Revival
- NRHP reference No.: 11000551
- VLR No.: 128-6271

Significant dates
- Added to NRHP: August 18, 2011
- Designated VLR: June 16, 2011

Belmont Methodist-Episcopal Church is a historic church building, located in the Belmont neighborhood of Roanoke, Virginia. It was built as a Methodist Episcopal church between 1917 and 1921, and is a three-story, brick, late Gothic Revival-style church. It features a tall bell tower, complex roof form, steeply pitched gables and parapets, large pointed arch windows, crenellated corner towers, buttresses, cast-concrete quatrefoils, and other detailing. Capacity within sight and hearing of the pulpit is 1,000, as the original auditorium (seats 440) was enlarged with an adjoining parlor (75), an adult assembly room (260), and a gallery (225).

In a notice from 1917, H. L. Cain is named the architect of the church building, and the cost of the building was initially budgeted at $50,000.00.

The building was sold in 2003 to the Metropolitan Community Church of the Blue Ridge, who used it as their sanctuary; that church has since vacated the building. The church was listed on the National Register of Historic Places (NRHP) in 2011. Since 2019, it has also been a contributing structure to the NRHP-listed Belmont Historic District.
