= Virginian Railway Passenger Station (Roanoke, Virginia) =

Historic former rail station in Virginia, US

- Virginian Railway Passenger; Station
- U.S. National Register of Historic Places
- U.S. Historic district – Contributing property
- Virginia Landmarks Register
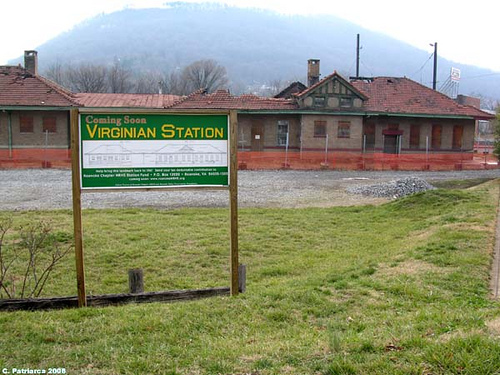
- Station in January 2008

- Location within Virginia Location within the United States
- Location: 1402 Jefferson St. SE, Roanoke, Virginia
- Coordinates: 37°15′35″N 79°56′28″W
- Area: less than one acre
- Built: 1909
- Architectural style: Spanish Revival
- Part of: Roanoke River and Railroad Historic District (ID13000994)
- NRHP reference No.: 03000456
- VLR No.: 128-5461

Significant dates
- Added to NRHP: May 22, 2003
- Designated CP: December 24, 2013
- Designated VLR: March 19, 2003

The Virginian Railway Passenger Station, also known as the Virginian Station, is a former rail station listed on the National Register of Historic Places in the South Jefferson neighborhood of the independent city of Roanoke, Virginia, U.S.A. Located at the intersection of Jefferson Street SE (VA 116) and Williamson Road, the Virginian Station served as a passenger station for the Virginian Railway between 1910 and 1956. The station was the only station constructed with brick along the entire length of the Virginian's 608 miles (978 km) network. It was severely damaged by fire on January 29, 2001.

== History ==
Standing at the division point between the New River Division and the Norfolk Division of the Virginian Railway, construction commenced on the Virginian Station in September 1909 and was complete by early 1910. Measuring 162 feet (49 m) long by 32 feet (9.8 m) wide, the station consists of a pair of one-story buildings, connected by a covered overhang and features a tile roof, a blond brick façade and terrazzo floors.

While overshadowed by the larger Norfolk & Western Railway, the Virginian station would serve passengers traveling between West Virginia and Norfolk through 1956 when passenger service was discontinued. By 1959, Virginian would merge with Norfolk & Western, and the former station would be leased out and subsequently operate as a feed and seed store.

By the late 1990s, the station was threatened with demolition to make way for an expansion of the Carilion bio-tech campus resulting in its placement on the Roanoke Valley Preservation Foundation's 2000 list of Most Endangered Sites. While operating as the Depot Country Store, on January 29, 2001, the former station suffered severe damage as a result of a fire. Despite the extensive damage, the station was cited for both its unique design and contribution to the railroad industry in Roanoke, and has been listed on the Virginia Landmarks Register since April 2003 and the National Register of Historic Places since June 2003.

In that year the Norfolk Southern Railway, the owner of the building, donated it to the Roanoke Chapter of the National Railway Historical Society, and that organization along with the Roanoke Valley Preservation Foundation began work on extensive renovations.

Phase I restoration was begun and completed in 2012. That involved removal of the substantial asbestos and lead contamination, stabilization of the building and replacement of the tile roof destroyed by the fire. Phase II was completed in 2016, and comprised completion of the interior including wiring and HVAC, along with parking, landscaping and restoration of the terrazzo floor. The building was completed and dedicated in November 2016.

As of 2023 the station is being used as an event venue for weddings and banquets.

== See also ==
- Roanoke station (Virginia)

Preceding station	Virginian Railway	Following station
Salem toward Deepwater	Main Line	Ruddell toward Norfolk
