= Colony House Motor Lodge =

Historic motel in Roanoke, Virginia, US

- U.S. National Register of Historic Places
- Virginia Landmarks Register
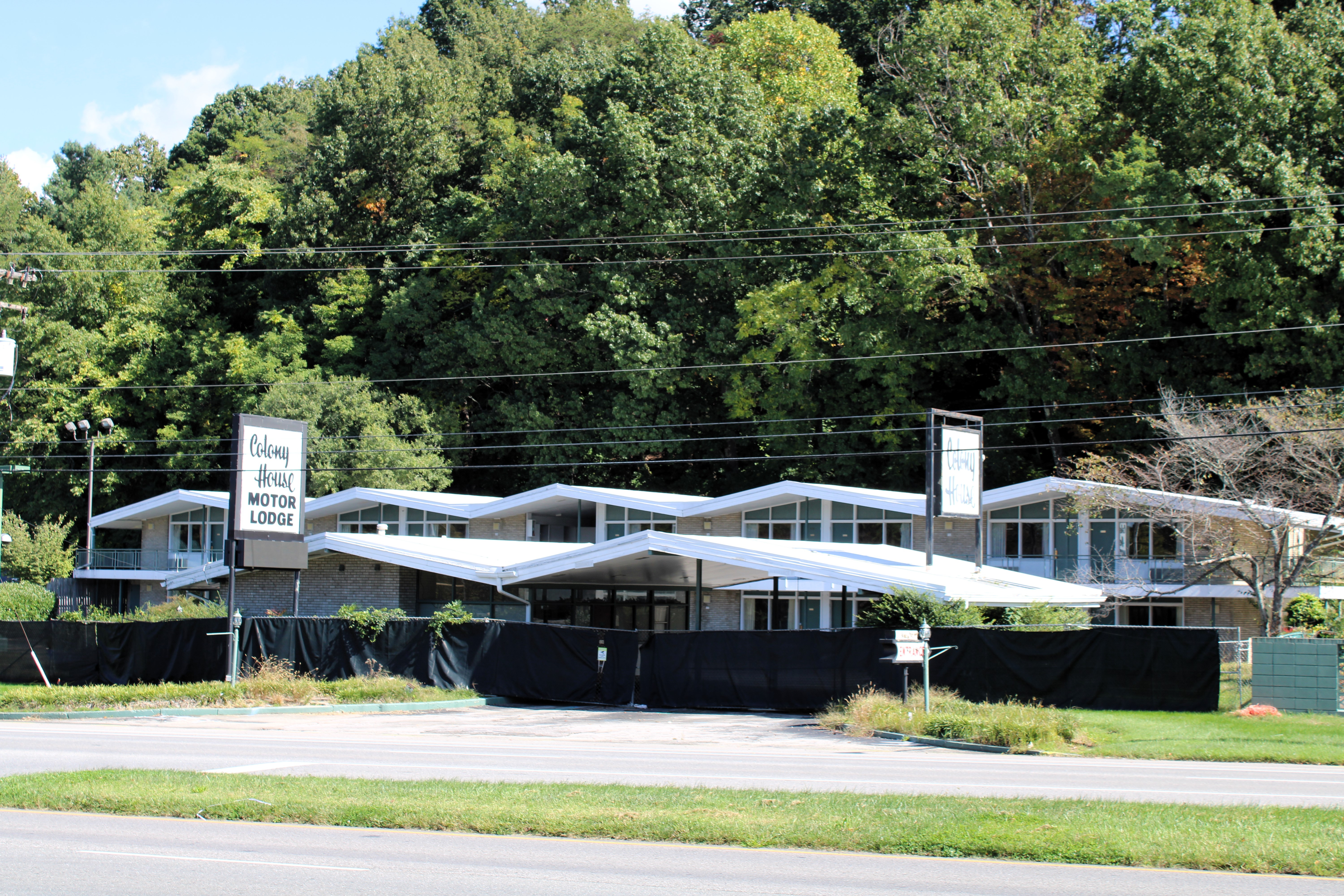
- Colony House Motor Lodge in 2023

- Location within Virginia Location within the United States
- Location: 3560 Franklin Road, SW, Roanoke, Virginia
- Coordinates: 37°14′11″N 79°58′09″W
- Area: 2.69 acres (1.09 ha)
- Built: 1959
- Architect: Kinsey and Motley
- Architectural style: Googie
- NRHP reference No.: 100008648
- VLR No.: 128-6477

Significant dates
- Added to NRHP: March 8, 2023
- Designated VLR: December 8, 2022

The Colony House Motor Lodge is a historic motel in Roanoke, Virginia. The motor lodge was built in 1959 in the Googie style and located on a main thoroughfare in what at the time was the outskirts of the city, making it a notable example of mid-20th century trends in design, travel, and lodging. The property consists of two buildings of guest rooms, an office and porte-cochere, and a swimming pool. Despite the changing character of its setting and national lodging trends, the motel remained in business until closing in 2018. It was listed on the National Register of Historic Places in 2023, and in 2025 had reopened as a boutique hotel. It was inducted into the Historic Hotels of America program in 2026.

== History ==
The Colony House Motor Lodge was developed by Glover and Richard Trent, a pair of brothers who were businessmen in Roanoke during the mid-20th century. The brothers built the motel on Franklin Road, the primary thoroughfare into the city from the south, at a location which at the time was part of Roanoke County and located outside the developed portion of the area. The motor lodge was designed by Kinsey and Motley, an architecture firm based out of nearby Salem, who developed an understated version of the Googie style for the business. The buildings' primary design trait is their folded plate roofs, cantilevered and painted white, which delineate the motel's bays. The same feature is used on the office roof as well as its attached porte-cochere. The assorted design elements show influence from the work of Frank Lloyd Wright.

The lodging portion of the property initially consisted of two buildings housing a total of 45 motel rooms. The buildings were constructed against a steep hillside; the first floor is one room deep, while the second floor has rooms back-to-back. The rooms are 300 square feet (28 m^{2}) each, and were built with heating and air conditioning as well as louvred screen doors for additional ventilation.

Along with the motel office and porte-cochere, an additional contributing resource to the property is a rectangular swimming pool, originally constructed with a masonry screen to shield swimmers from traffic on the road. The property initially included a steak restaurant called Town and Ranch; after it burned in the early 1980s it was replaced with a 1984 addition to the motel, connected via a breezeway, that increased its room capacity to 67. The final contributing structures are two signs that date to the motel's 1959 opening and a c. 1970 sign.

The motor lodge was a popular destination in its early years and benefitted from a national trend of increasing automobile tourism. Its proximity to Roanoke's Victory Stadium saw it host not only attendees of that venue's events but also many of its performers. Notable guests included football player Johnny Unitas, whose Baltimore Colts played exhibition games in the stadium in 1961 and 1962, and the English pop band Herman's Hermits, who also held a meet and greet with fans at the property's Town and Ranch restaurant in 1965.

Despite the rise of national hotel chains in the latter half of the 20th century, the growth of Franklin Road as a commercial corridor, and the construction of an expressway that bypassed the road into Downtown Roanoke, the Colony House stayed in business longer than many similar establishments in the area. With its décor little changed since its opening, the motel attracted guests seeking a retro lodging experience.

In 2018, the Trent family, owners of the motel since its opening, closed its doors and sold the property. The motor lodge was listed on the National Register of Historic Places in 2023, and that same year it was announced that the site was being renovated in the style of a boutique hotel. The rooms would be modernized and updated, but the exterior appearance would remain largely the same. The hotel reopened in 2025, and was inducted into the Historic Hotels of America program the following year.
