= Kent Road Village =

- U.S. National Register of Historic Places
- U.S. Historic district
- Virginia Landmarks Register
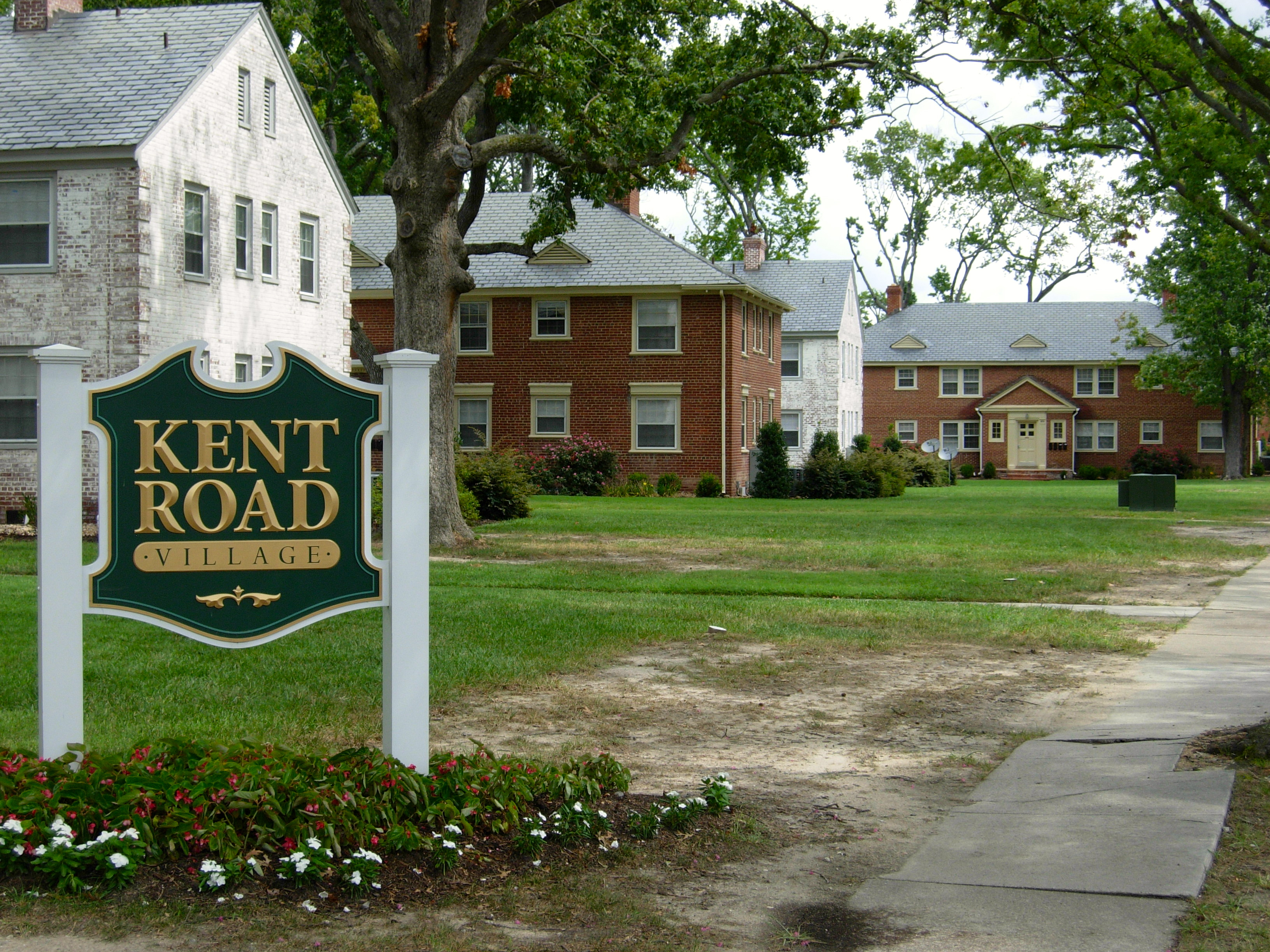
- Kent Road Village, August 2012

- Location within Virginia Location within the United States
- Location: 920-924 N. Hamilton St. & 905-935 Kent Rd., Richmond, Virginia
- Coordinates: 37°33′58″N 77°29′06″W
- Area: 3.421 acres (1.384 ha)
- Built: 1942-1943
- Architect: E. Tucker Carlton
- Architectural style: Colonial Revival
- MPS: Federal Housing Administration-Insured Garden Apartments in Richmond, Virginia MPS
- NRHP reference No.: 11000549
- VLR No.: 127-6514

Significant dates
- Added to NRHP: August 18, 2011
- Designated VLR: June 16, 2011

Kent Road Village is a historic apartment complex and national historic district located in Richmond, Virginia. The complex was built in 1942–1943, and consists of 11 Colonial Revival style brick buildings. They are two stories in height and include three different exterior treatments. The complex was designed by Richmond architect E. Tucker Carlton and built under the auspices of the Federal Housing Administration.

It was listed on the National Register of Historic Places in 2011.
