= Fire Barn 5 (Elgin, Illinois) =

- U.S. National Register of Historic Places
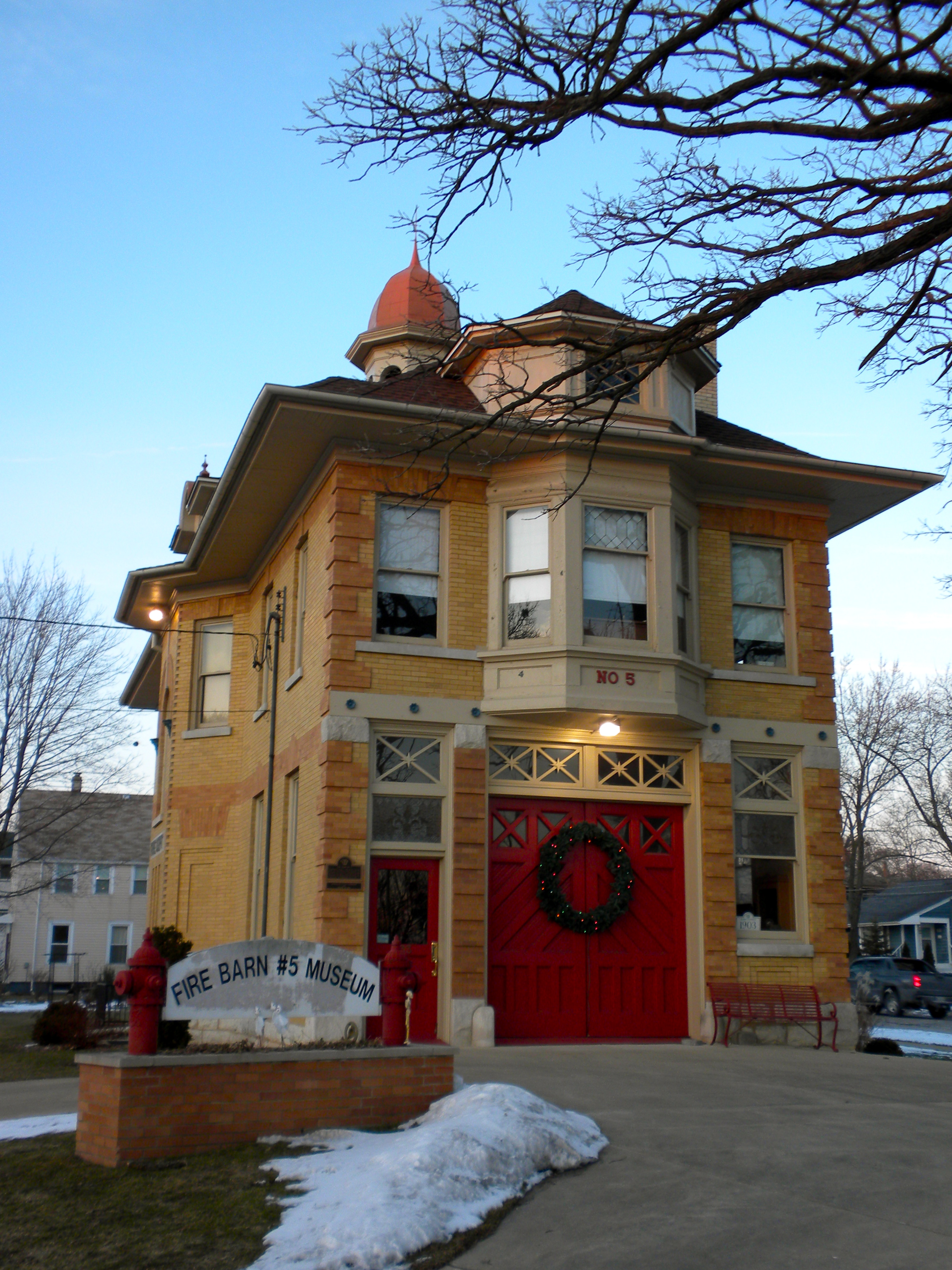

- Location within Illinois Location within the United States
- Location: 533 St. Charles Rd., Elgin, Illinois
- Coordinates: 42°1′32″N 88°16′10″W
- Area: less than one acre
- Built: 1903
- Architect: Smith Hoag
- Architectural style: Classical Revival
- NRHP reference No.: 91001002
- Added to NRHP: August 5, 1991

Fire Barn 5 or Fire Station 5 is a historic building in Elgin, Illinois. It was the fifth official fire barn in Elgin, originally housing horses and a fire fighting carriage. Over the years, the carriage was replaced by automobiles. The building is an example of Classical Revival architecture and operated as a fire station until 1991, the year it was added to the National Register of Historic Places. It now functions as the Elgin Fire Barn No. 5 Museum, a museum of firefighting history.

== History ==
Elgin, Illinois was first settled in the 1830s and was incorporated in 1854. Upon incorporation, the city was able to raise taxes for public buildings, including a town hall and schools. With the success of the Elgin National Watch Company and the Gail Borden Condensing Company, Elgin became a prosperous manufacturing town by the late 1860s. It was at this point when the first fire department of Elgin was established following a bad fire on July 15, 1865. A storage facility was built for firefighting equipment, and featured a bell to alarm citizens when a fire broke out. Elgin citizens were eager to support the department because of reduced insurance premiums. Fire hydrants were installed in 1875. The department ran on a volunteer basis until the late 1880s, when professional carriage-drivers were hired to drive the fire engine. The growth of the department closely followed the growth of Elgin as a whole. The first fire station, capable of housing on-duty firefighters, was opened on January 19, 1889 on the site of the original truck house. Two years later, a second station was opened on Chicago Street near State Street. Two additional fire houses were built in 1896.

The economic success of Elgin in the early 1900s inspired town officials to build a fifth fire station in a distinct architectural style. The new station was built on the corner of Arlington Avenue and St. Charles Street. The city bought the lot from Thomas S. Wallin for $800. Local architect Smith Hoag was tasked with the fire house's design. The Classical Revival structured was completed in 1903 at a cost of $6,262. The first fire house captain was William Seyfarth. The station was built in near-isolation in the southeast extremes of Elgin, but the nearby neighborhoods quickly filled in. Wallin also deeded a small lot by the station to be used as a recreational area. In 1905, a fountain and basin were constructed there and stocked with fish. In the 1910s, many of the horse-drawn carriages of the fire department were replaced with automobiles. Telephone lines were installed between stations in 1919. During the Great Depression, Fire Station 5 was closed and the men instead worked Fire Station 1. While closed, the building briefly operated as the studio for sculptor Trygve Rovelstad. Fire Station Five reopened in 1939. The building was listed on the National Register of Historic Places on August 5, 1991, shortly before it was to cease function as an operating station. It now operates as a museum and contains historical fire fighting artifacts, including a Silsby Steamer engine used to fight the Great Chicago Fire in 1871.

== Architecture ==
Smith Hoag wanted the Fire Barn to reflect the changing public perception of firemen. The front of the building (south) was intended to resemble a commercial storefront with a large apparatus door. The door is not original; it had to be replaced to meet the demands of larger firefight equipment. The Classical Revival style was popular in the 1900s; Hoag incorporated elements of the style by including a second-floor bay window and fancy window shapes. The main door and bay window are both flanked with windows on each side. The building was built with blonde brick with red brick highlights on lintels at quoins. The roof is hipped and features a domed, octagonal, wooden cupola, used as a bell tower. A semi-circular stained glass window adorns the east side with brick pilasters below a brick frieze. Two windows are on east side of the semi-circular window. The south end of the eastern exterior has a chimney and the north end a dormer. The west side is similar to the east, but has a two-story bay window and no chimney or dormer. The north end features smaller windows and a hayloft.

Inside, the front of the building originally housed the fire fighting apparatus while the rear housed the horses. Personnel stayed on the second floor and could access the first floor via a brass sliding pole. A steep staircase, intended to keep horses from following firemen up to their quarters, also led to the second floor. Hay was stored on the third floor loft. The captain had a room of his own with a desk.
