= Tayloe Rogers House =

Historic house in Virginia, United States

- U.S. National Register of Historic Places
- Virginia Landmarks Register
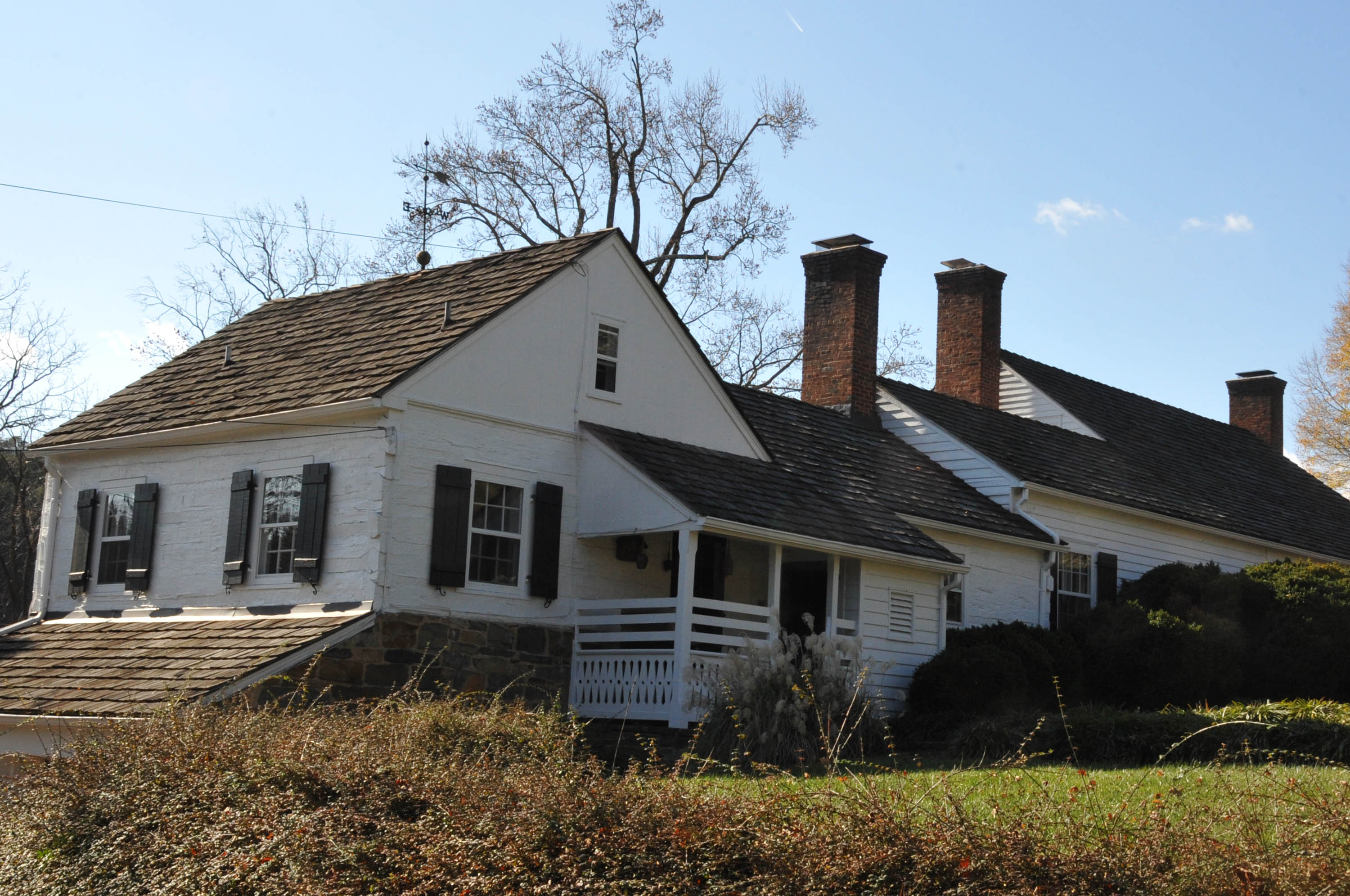

- Location within Virginia Location within the United States
- Location: 1542 Electric Rd., SW, Roanoke, Virginia
- Coordinates: 37°15′25″N 80°02′01″W
- Area: 6 acres (2.4 ha)
- Built: 1936-1937
- Architectural style: Colonial Revival
- NRHP reference No.: 12000970
- VLR No.: 128-6362

Significant dates
- Added to NRHP: November 21, 2012
- Designated VLR: September 20, 2012

Tayloe Rogers House is a historic home located in Roanoke, Virginia. It was built in 1936–1937 and is a 1 1/2-story, rustic Colonial Revival style dwelling. The main section is flanked by one-story wings. It has a gable roof and features large exterior end chimneys. The house is built of re-used materials from an earlier building on the property that had collapsed as well as other older structures in the area. Also on the property is a contributing springhouse.

It was listed on the National Register of Historic Places in 2012.
