= Virginia Can Company-S.H. Heironimus Warehouse =

- U.S. National Register of Historic Places
- U.S. Historic district – Contributing property
- Virginia Landmarks Register
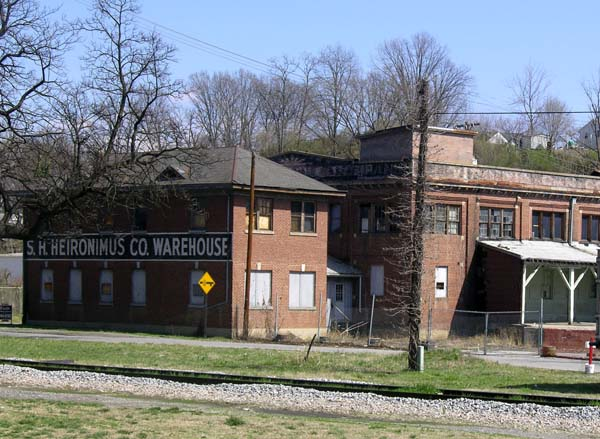
- Virginia Can Company-S.H. Heironimus Warehouse, June 2010

- Location within Virginia Location within the United States
- Location: 315 Albemarle SE, Roanoke, Virginia
- Coordinates: 37°15′54″N 79°56′18″W
- Area: 1.1 acres (0.45 ha)
- Built: 1912
- Part of: Roanoke River and Railroad Historic District (ID13000994)
- NRHP reference No.: 06000067
- VLR No.: 128-5455

Significant dates
- Added to NRHP: February 22, 2006
- Designated CP: December 24, 2013
- Designated VLR: December 7, 2005

Virginia Can Company-S.H. Heironimus Warehouse is a historic factory and warehouse complex located at Roanoke, Virginia. The U-shaped complex was built in 1912, and consists of an office and two factory buildings. All three of the buildings are two stories in height and are constructed of brick on a raised foundation of poured concrete. A second-story pedestrian bridge connects the two factory buildings and a brick hyphen connects the office building to the north factory building. The complex was built for the Virginia Can Company, the first and largest manufacturer of tin cans in Roanoke, Virginia. After 1951, it housed a clothing factory and then the Heironimus department store warehouse.

It was listed on the National Register of Historic Places in 2006, and included in the Roanoke River and Railroad Historic District in 2013. It is located in the Virginia Landmarks Register listed Southeast Roanoke Historic District.
