= Roanoke City Firehouse No. 6 =

Historic firehouse in Roanoke, Virginia, US

- U.S. National Register of Historic Places
- Virginia Landmarks Register
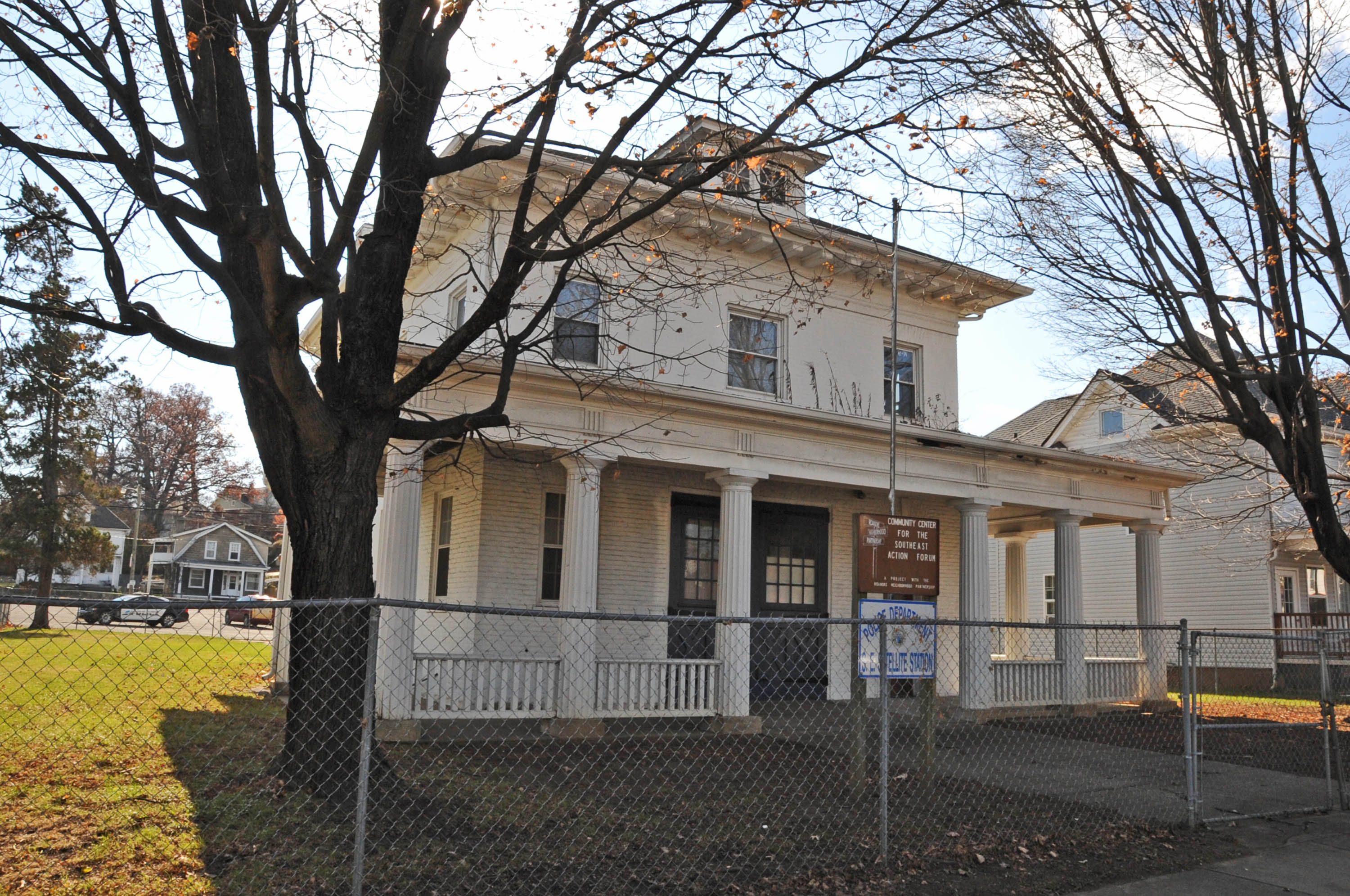
- Roanoke City Firehouse No. 6 in 2014

- Location within Virginia Location within the United States
- Location: 1015 Jamison Ave., SE., Roanoke, Virginia
- Coordinates: 37°16′9″N 79°55′36″W
- Area: less than one acre
- Built: 1911
- Architect: Miller, Homer M.
- Architectural style: Classical Revival
- NRHP reference No.: 90002162
- VLR No.: 128-0051

Significant dates
- Added to NRHP: January 24, 1991
- Designated VLR: April 17, 1990

Roanoke City Firehouse No. 6 is a historic fire station located in the Belmont neighborhood of Roanoke, Virginia. It was built in 1911, and is a two-story, three-bay, hipped-roof building. in an effort to blend the station into its residential surroundings, it was constructed to resemble an early-20th century American Foursquare dwelling embellished with Classical Revival details. A wide center bay and two large double doors distinguish it from the homes in the neighborhood. The station was one of three with the same design that were built by architect Homer M. Miller and all put into service on the same day in September 1911. As of 2023, one of the other two stations survives and was listed on the National Register of Historic Places in 2011 as City of Roanoke Fire Station No. 5. The three stations were the first in Roanoke to be built for and equipped with motorized firefighting equipment. They were integrated into the neighborhoods they were built to serve, limiting their need to travel farther than 1.5 miles (2.4 km) in response to a call.

It was listed on the National Register of Historic Places in 1991. After ceasing operation as a firehouse in 1979, the building was converted to use as a community center, and later as a satellite police station.
