= Boxley–Sprinkle House =

Historic house in Virginia, United States

- U.S. National Register of Historic Places
- Virginia Landmarks Register
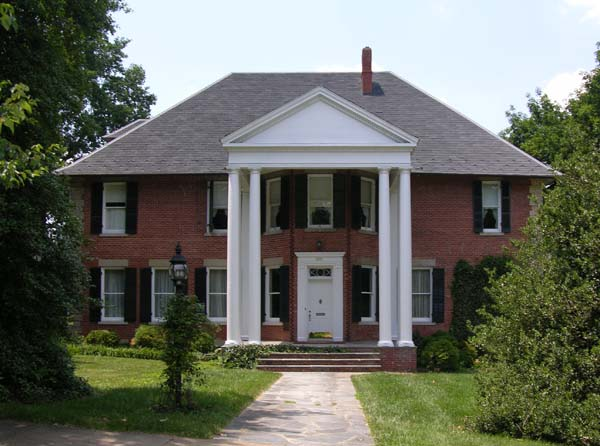
- Boxley–Sprinkle House, June 2010

- Location within Virginia Location within the United States
- Location: 2611 Crystal Spring Ave., Roanoke, Virginia
- Coordinates: 37°14′41″N 79°57′2″W
- Area: 1.2 acres (0.49 ha)
- Built: 1907, 1940s
- Built by: Boxley, Robert F.
- Architectural style: Colonial Revival
- NRHP reference No.: 04001275
- VLR No.: 128-5978

Significant dates
- Added to NRHP: November 27, 2004
- Designated VLR: September 8, 2004

Boxley–Sprinkle House is a historic home located at Roanoke, Virginia. It was built in 1907, and is a two-story, five-bay, Colonial Revival style brick dwelling. It has a central projecting bay, full height entrance portico and hipped roof. The house was originally constructed in the Victorian style, with the entrance facing 26th Street (then 5th Avenue) with a corner turret, projecting polygonal bays and a wraparound porch. In the 1940s, the house was redesigned in the Colonial Revival style and the entrance was changed to face Crystal Spring Avenue.

It was listed on the National Register of Historic Places in 2004.
