= Fire Station No. 5 (Roanoke, Virginia) =

- City of Roanoke Fire Station No. 5
- U.S. National Register of Historic Places
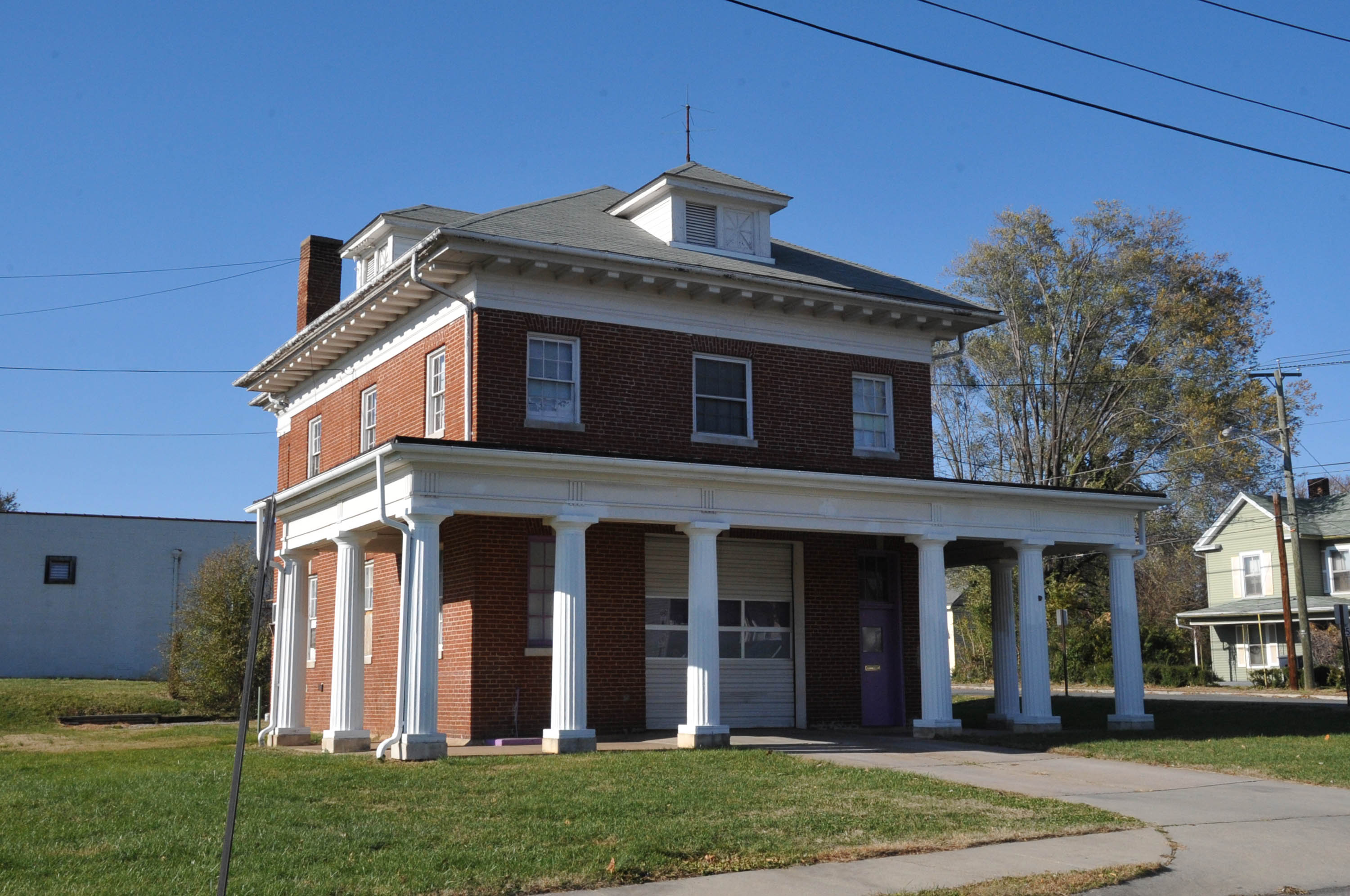

- Location within Virginia Location within the United States
- Location: 216 12th St. NW, Roanoke, Virginia
- Coordinates: 37°16′45″N 79°57′32″W
- Area: 0.3 acres (0.12 ha)
- Built: 1911
- Architect: Miller, Homer M. Miller
- Architectural style: Colonial Revival
- NRHP reference No.: 11000838
- Added to NRHP: November 18, 2011

Fire Station No. 5 in Roanoke, Virginia is a former fire station at 216 12th Street NW, in the independent city of Roanoke. The neighborhood fire station was one of three built in 1911, and was designed to look like a house, blending into its residential neighborhood. It housed one of the city's first fire trucks to be powered by an internal combustion engine. It served the city as a fire station until 2010, when it was turned over to a local nonprofit organization.

The building was listed on the National Register of Historic Places in 2011 as City of Roanoke Fire Station No. 5.

== See also ==
- National Register of Historic Places listings in Roanoke, Virginia
