= Roanoke Apartments =

Historic buildings in Virginia, US

- U.S. National Register of Historic Places
- Virginia Landmarks Register
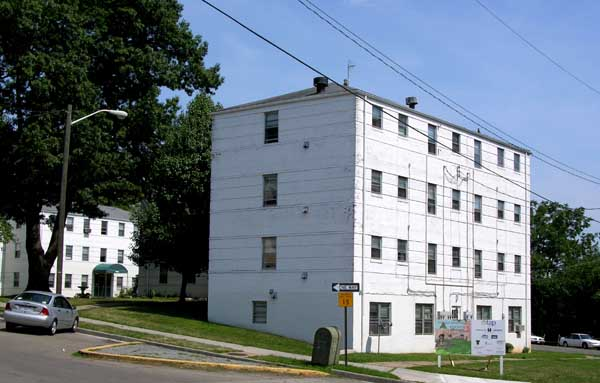

- Location within Virginia Location within the United States
- Location: 1402 Maiden Ln., Roanoke, Virginia
- Coordinates: 37°15′56″N 79°58′7″W
- Area: 8.9 acres (3.6 ha)
- Built: 1950
- Architect: Mactier, James F.; Wood, Paul A.
- Architectural style: Moderne
- NRHP reference No.: 06000759
- VLR No.: 128-6066

Significant dates
- Added to NRHP: November 9, 2006
- Designated VLR: June 8, 2006

The Roanoke Apartments, also known as the Terrace Apartments, is an apartment complex listed on the National Register of Historic Places located at 1402 Maiden Lane in the Raleigh Court neighborhood of the independent city of Roanoke, Virginia, U.S.A. Designed by James F. Mactier and constructed by Paul A. Wood, the complex features seven separate buildings, each with brick facades, and is Roanoke's best example of the streamline moderne style developed in the early 1950s. Today the complex is noted for its ethnic diversity with its residents representing a wide array of religious and ethnic groups.

== History ==
Completed in 1950, the complex was conceived and constructed to house the families of working class World War II veterans. Upon its completion, this became the largest apartment complex within the city of Roanoke. The overall layout of the complex reflects the principles of the Garden City Movement with the complex being set back from the main streets and the extensive landscaping and use of existing vegetation throughout the complex.

The buildings themselves exhibit streamline moderne architectural style in their form and details. These elements include horizontal banding of the brickwork, glass block panels and flat concrete canopies at the entrance areas.

Originally providing residence to Roanoke's working class, today the complex is noted for the diversity of its residents. In 1975, Southeast Asian refugees were housed at the apartments beginning a trend of the facility to serve as residences for refugees displaced to Roanoke. Today the complex is home to both working-class blacks and whites in addition to refugees from Somalia, Liberia, Sierra Leone, Albania, Bosnia, Afghanistan, Cuba, Sudan, Haiti and Iraq.

After being placed on the National Register of Historic Places in 2006, the local non-profit Total Action Against Poverty announced plans to fully renovate and modernize the facility while keeping its historic appearance intact. Costing an estimated $27 million to complete, with nearly $9 million coming from historic and low-income housing tax credits made available from its inclusion in the register, the first refurbished building was complete in September 2007. Upon its completion in 2009, the overall units will be reduced from 250 units to 201 units.
