= List of Hollins University people =

The following is a list of individuals associated with Hollins University through attending as a student, or serving as a member of the faculty or staff.

== Notable alumni ==
=== Activism ===
- Ellen Malcolm, Founder of EMILY's List, 1969

=== Arts ===
- Nancy Bryan Faircloth, philanthropist and arts patron, chairwoman of the North Carolina Symphony Guild
- Haruki Fujimoto, dancer, choreographer, Broadway performer, and teacher at Hollins for 20 years
- Gaspard Louis, dancer, choreographer
- Sally Mann, photographer and writer, shortlisted for 2015 National Book Award, 1974, M.A. 1975
- Katy Pyle, dancer and choreographer, artistic director of Ballez, B.A. 2002
- Jane Stuart Smith, operatic soprano, hymnologist, and author

=== Authors ===
- Madison Smartt Bell, author of Ten Indians, M.A. 1981
- Jenny Boully, author of five books, professor of creative writing and literature at Bennington College, 1998, M.A. 1999
- Margaret Wise Brown, author of Goodnight Moon, 1932
- Amanda Cockrell, children's book author, 1969, M.A. 1988
- Kiran Desai, author and recipient of the Man Booker Prize in 2006, M.A. 1994
- Tony D'Souza, author of Whiteman, M.A. 1998
- Elizabeth Forsythe Hailey, author of A Woman of Independent Means, 1960
- Cathryn Hankla, poet, 1980, M.A. 1982
- Tama Janowitz, author, M.A. 1979, commonly grouped with 1980s literary Brat Pack
- Beth Macy, author; Factory Man was a New York Times best seller and optioned by Playtone for an HBO miniseries, M.A. 1998
- Jill McCorkle, author, 1981
- Kevin Prufer, poet, novelist, essayist, editor, M.A. 1994; 2024 Rilke Prize for American poetry
- Candice F. Ransom, author of children's books
- Ethel Morgan Smith, author of From Whence Cometh My Help: The African American Community at Hollins College, 1999
- Lee Smith, author and winner of many awards including the Southern Book Critics Circle Award and two O. Henry Awards, 1967
- Edna Henry Lee Turpin, author of children's books, ALND 1887

=== Government and public service ===
- Jennifer Boysko, member of the Virginia House of Delegates, 1989
- Betsy B. Carr, member of the Virginia House of Delegates, 1968
- Pamela Jo Howell Slutz, career diplomat and former U.S. ambassador to Burundi and Mongolia, 1970
- Hally Ballinger Bryan Perry, co-founder of the Daughters of the Republic of Texas

=== Higher education ===
- Linda Koch Lorimer, president, Randolph-Macon Woman’s College; vice president for global and strategic initiatives, Yale University, 1974

=== Journalism ===
- Ann Compton, ABC News White House correspondent, 1969
- Mary Garber, first female sportswriter in the Atlantic Coast Conference, 1938
- Ruth Hale, journalist, feminist, and founder of the Lucy Stone League

=== Law ===
- Callie V. Granade, district judge, United States District Court for the Southern District of Alabama, 1972

=== Media and entertainment ===
- Jennifer Berman, sexual health expert, urologist, and female sexual medicine specialist
- George Butler, documentary filmmaker and writer, M.A. 1968
- Ellen Goldsmith-Vein, owner and CEO of the Gotham Group, dubbed one of Hollywood's Most Powerful Women, 1984
- Donna Richardson, fitness and aerobics instructor, author and television sports commentator, ALND 1984
- Eleanor D. Wilson, actress and Tony Award nominee, 1930

=== Pulitzer Prize winners ===
- Mary Wells Ashworth, Pulitzer Prize–winning historian, 1924
- Annie Dillard, Pulitzer Prize–winning writer, 1967, M.A. 1968
- Henry S. Taylor, Pulitzer Prize–winning poet, M.A. 1966
- Natasha Trethewey, poet, winner of the Pulitzer Prize in 2007, United States Poet Laureate, M.A. 1991

=== Science and medicine ===
- Jennifer Berman, pioneer in the field of female urology and female sexual medicine, 1986
- Mary E. Hatten, Frederick P. Rose Professor and head of Laboratory of Developmental Neurobiology, Rockefeller University, 1971

=== Sports ===
- Charlotte Fox, first woman to have climbed three of the world’s 8,000-meter peaks, 1979
- Carol Semple Thompson, amateur golf champion, elected to the World Golf Hall of Fame, 1970
