= Ethel Smith =

Ethel Smith may refer to:

- Ethel Smith (organist) (1902–1996), American organist
- Ethel Smith (athlete) (1907–1979), Canadian sprinter
- Ethel M. Smith (1877–1951), women's rights activist and union activist
- Ethel Morgan Smith (born 1952), American author and associate professor
- Ethel Smith Dorrance, née, American writer
- Ethel Smith, Bo Diddley's second wife and the pseudonym he used for his writing credits on Love Is Strange

== See also ==
- Ethel Smyth (1858–1944), English composer and suffragist
- Ray F. and Ethel Smith House (1937), historic residence in Murray, Utah
