= Demographics of San Francisco =

- Population pyramid of San Francisco in 2021
- Population: 815,201 (2021 American Community Survey)

Historical population
Year	Pop.	±%
1848	1,000	—
1849	25,000	+2400.0%
1852	34,776	+39.1%
1860	56,802	+63.3%
1870	149,473	+163.1%
1880	233,959	+56.5%
1890	298,997	+27.8%
1900	342,782	+14.6%
1910	416,912	+21.6%
1920	506,676	+21.5%
1930	634,394	+25.2%
1940	634,536	+0.0%
1950	775,357	+22.2%
1960	740,316	−4.5%
1970	715,674	−3.3%
1980	678,974	−5.1%
1990	723,959	+6.6%
2000	776,733	+7.3%
2010	805,235	+3.7%
2020	873,965	+8.5%
2022	808,437	−7.5%
Sources: Source: U.S. Decennial Census

The 2020 United States Census reported that San Francisco had a population of 873,965—an increase from the 2010 Census count of 805,235. The 2022 Census Bureau American Community Survey put the population at 808,437: a decrease of 65,528 from 2020. With a population density of 18,633 per square mile (7,194/km^{2}), San Francisco is the second-most densely populated major American city, behind only New York (among cities greater than 200,000 population).

San Francisco is the traditional focal point of the San Francisco Bay Area and forms part of the five-county San Francisco–Oakland–Hayward, CA Metropolitan Statistical Area, a region of 4.6 million people. It is also part of the greater 12-county San Jose-San Francisco-Oakland, CA Combined Statistical Area, whose population is over 8.75 million, making it the fifth-largest in the United States as of July 1, 2016.

== Race and ethnicity ==
As of the 2024 census estimates, the racial makeup and population of San Francisco included: Whites (50.8%), Asians (37.2%), African Americans (5.7%), Native Americans (0.8%), Native Hawaiians and Pacific Islanders (0.5%) two or more races (5%). The ethnic makeup of San Francisco is 16.4% Hispanics or Latinos of any race, 83.6% Non-Hispanic.

According to the 2024 census estimate, San Francisco has a minority-majority population, as non-Hispanic White Americans comprise less than half of the population at 36.5%, down from 92.5% in 1940. The principal Hispanic groups in the city were those of Mexican, Salvadoran, Nicaraguan, Guatemalan, and Puerto Rican ancestry. The Hispanic population is most heavily concentrated in the Mission District, Tenderloin District, and Excelsior District. San Francisco's African American population has declined in recent decades, from 13.4% of the population in 1970 to 6.1% in 2010. The current percentage of African Americans in San Francisco is similar to that of the state of California; conversely, the city's percentage of Hispanic residents is less than half of that of the state. The majority of the city's black population reside within the neighborhoods of Bayview-Hunters Point, and Visitacion Valley in southeastern San Francisco, and in the Fillmore District in the northeastern part of the city.

In 2010, residents of Chinese ethnicity constituted the largest single ethnic minority group in San Francisco at 21.4% of the population; the other Asian groups are Filipinos (4.5%), Vietnamese (1.6%), Japanese (1.3%), Asian Indians (1.2%), Koreans (1.2%), Thais (0.3%), Burmese (0.2%), Cambodians (0.2%), and Indonesians, Laotians, and Mongolians make up less than 0.1% of the city's population. The population of Chinese ancestry is most heavily concentrated in Chinatown, Sunset District, and Richmond District, whereas Filipinos are most concentrated in the Crocker-Amazon (which is contiguous with the Filipino community of Daly City, which has one of the highest concentrations of Filipinos in North America), as well as in SoMa.

After declining in the 1970s and 1980s, the Filipino community in the city has experienced a significant resurgence. The San Francisco Bay Area is home to over 382,950 Filipino Americans, one of the largest communities of Filipinos outside of the Philippines. The Tenderloin District is home to a large portion of the city's Vietnamese population as well as businesses and restaurants, which is known as the city's Little Saigon. Koreans and Japanese have a large presence in the Western Addition, which is where the city's Japantown is located. The Pacific Islander population is 0.4% (0.8% including those with partial ancestry). Over half of the Pacific Islander population is of Samoan descent, with residence in the Bayview-Hunters Point and Visitacion Valley areas; Pacific Islanders make up more than three percent of the population in both communities.

Native-born Californians form a relatively small percentage of the city's population: only 37.7% of its residents were born in California, while 25.2% were born in a different U.S. state. More than a third of San Francisco residents (34.2%) were born outside the United States.

=== Historical estimates ===
Demographic profile	1860	1870	1880	1900	1910	1920	1930	1940	1950	1960	1970	1980	1990	2000	2010	2020
Non-Hispanic White alone	90.2%	89.0%	87.7%	92.5%	93.8%	93.5%	91.0%	91.1%	83.2%	72.7%	60.7%	52.8%	46.9%	43.5%	41.7%	39.1%
— Middle Eastern/Central Asian American (Note: 1880-1930: Born or with parent born in Middle East/Central Asia (including West Asia, North Africa, Caucuses, Central Asia). 1980-2020: Born or listing ancestry in Middle East/Central Asia.)	—	—	<0.1%	0.1%	0.2%	0.2%	0.5%	(0.8%) (Note: Figures in parentheses from 1940 to 1970 are derived from linear interpolation of group's share of higher level group (e.g., "Non-Hispanic White alone") figure between 1930 and 1980.)	(1.0%)	(1.2%)	(1.2%)	1.2%	1.5%	1.4%	1.4%	1.9%
— Hispanic American, n.e.c. (Note: 1880-1930: Born or with parent born in Spain or Spanish-Speaking Americas. 1980-2020: Born or listing ancestry in Spain or Spanish-Speaking Americas. "Not elsewhere classified" (above).)	—	—	—	—	—	<0.1%	<0.1%	(0.2%)	(0.4%)	(0.6%)	(0.8%)	0.7%	0.7%	0.6%	0.9%	0.3%
— Eastern European American, n.e.c. (Note: 1880-1930: Born or with parent born in Eastern Europe (including former Soviet bloc and Greece). 1980-2020: Born or listing ancestry in Eastern Europe. "Not elsewhere classified" (above).)	—	—	1.7%	1.9%	2.9%	4.8%	5.5%	(7.1%)	(7.9%)	(8.1%)	(7.8%)	7.7%	8.1%	7.7%	8.3%	6.5%
— Portuguese or Brazilian American, n.e.c. (Note: 1880-1930: Born or with parent born in Portugal or Brazil. 1980-2020: Born or listing ancestry in Portugal or Brazil. "Not elsewhere classified" (above).)	—	—	0.3%	0.4%	0.4%	0.5%	0.5%	(0.6%)	(0.6%)	(0.6%)	(0.5%)	0.5%	0.5%	0.4%	0.4%	0.3%
— Italian American, n.e.c. (Note: 1880-1930: Born or with parent born in Italy. 1980-2020: Born or listing ancestry in Italy. "Not elsewhere classified" (above).)	—	—	1.8%	4.5%	7.2%	9.2%	9.3%	(9.3%)	(8.5%)	(7.4%)	(6.2%)	5.4%	5.0%	4.0%	3.8%	3.5%
— Other European American, n.e.c. (Note: Balance of overall "Non-Hispanic White alone" figure and 5 groups listed above; largely Northwest European Americans (British, Irish, German, etc.).)	—	—	83.8%	85.6%	82.8%	77.%	74.2%	(73.1%)	(64.8%)	(54.8%)	(44.3%)	36.3%	30.1%	28.5%	26.1%	26.7%
Non-Hispanic Asian alone	4.6%	8.0%	9.3%	4.6%	3.8%	2.7%	4.0%	4.1%	3.6%	7.9%	14.0%	21.3%	28.0%	30.7%	33.1%	33.7%
— Chinese American	4.6%	8.0%	9.3%	4.1%	2.7%	1.5%	2.5%	2.8%	2.5%	5.1%	8.7%	12.1%	17.6%	20.0%	19.8%	21.0%
— Filipino American	—	—	—	—	—	0.2%	0.5%	0.5%	0.5%	1.5%	3.6%	5.2%	5.4%	5.0%	4.9%	4.4%
— Indian American	—	—	—	—	—	<0.1%	<0.1%	<0.1%	—	—	—	0.3%	0.3%	0.6%	1.6%	2.2%
— Vietnamese American	—	—	—	—	—	—	—	—	—	—	—	0.8%	1.3%	1.4%	2.1%	1.4%
— Korean American	—	—	—	—	<0.1%	<0.1%	<0.1%	<0.1%	—	—	0.1%	0.5%	0.9%	0.9%	1.5%	1.5%
— Japanese American	—	<0.1%	<0.1%	0.5%	1.1%	1.0%	1.0%	0.8%	0.6%	1.3%	1.6%	1.9%	1.6%	1.5%	1.3%	0.9%
Hispanic or Latino, any race(s)	3.0%	2.1%	2.4%	2.5%	2.5%	3.4%	4.4%	4.1%	5.7%	9.4%	11.5%	12.6%	13.3%	14.2%	15.2%	15.6%
— Native American/Indigenous alone	<0.1%	<0.1%	<0.1%	<0.1%	<0.1%	<0.1%	<0.1%	<0.1%	<0.1%	<0.1%	<0.1%	0.1%	0.1%	0.2%	0.3%	0.5%
— Black alone or in combination	0.1%	<0.1%	0.1%	<0.1%	<0.1%	<0.1%	<0.1%	<0.1%	<0.1%	0.2%	0.5%	0.2%	0.3%	0.4%	0.2%	0.6%
— Asian or Pacific Islander alone	—	<0.1%	<0.1%	<0.1%	<0.1%	<0.1%	<0.1%	<0.1%	<0.1%	0.1%	0.2%	0.8%	0.5%	0.3%	0.2%	0.4%
— Listing European Ancestry, n.e.c. (Note: 1880-1930: Born or with parents born in Europe. 1980-2020: Born or listing ancestry in Europe. "Not elsewhere classified" (above).)	—	—	0.9%	1.1%	0.9%	1.4%	1.5%	(1.2%)	(1.5%)	(2.0%)	(2.0%)	1.7%	1.3%	1.3%	2.0%	2.4%
— Salvadoran American, n.e.c. (Note: 1880-1930: Born or with parents born in El Salvador. 1980-2020: Born or listing ancestry in El Salvador. "Not elsewhere classified" (above).)	—	—	—	<0.1%	<0.1%	<0.1%	0.1%	(0.2%)	(0.3%)	(0.7%)	(1.1%)	1.4%	2.7%	2.7%	2.0%	2.1%
— Mexican American, n.e.c. (Note: 1880-1930: Born or with parents born in Mexico, or the American Southwest before 1850. 1980-2020: Born or listing ancestry in Mexico. "Not elsewhere classified" (above).)	—	—	1.1%	1.2%	1.0%	1.5%	2.2%	(2.0%)	(2.6%)	(4.1%)	(4.7%)	4.9%	4.7%	5.5%	6.6%	6.1%
Non-Hispanic Black alone	2.1%	0.9%	0.6%	0.4%	0.4%	0.4%	0.5%	0.7%	7.4%	9.7%	13.1%	12.3%	10.7%	7.6%	6.0%	5.1%
— Listing West Indian or Brazilian Ancestry	—	—	—	—	—	—	—	—	—	—	—	0.2%	0.1%	0.1%	0.2%	0.2%
— Listing Specific African Ancestry, n.e.c.	—	—	—	—	—	—	—	—	—	—	—	0.1%	0.2%	0.1%	0.2%	0.5%
— Other African American, n.e.c. (Note: Largely descended from enslaved Americans.)	—	—	—	—	—	—	—	—	—	—	—	12.0%	10.4%	7.4%	5.6%	4.4%
Non-Hispanic Pacific Islander alone	—	—	—	—	<0.1%	<0.1%	<0.1%	—	0.1%	0.2%	0.4%	0.4%	0.5%	0.3%	0.5%	0.3%
Non-Hispanic Native American alone	<0.1%	<0.1%	<0.1%	<0.1%	<0.1%	<0.1%	<0.1%	<0.1%	<0.1%	0.1%	0.2%	0.4%	0.4%	0.3%	0.3%	0.2%
Non-Hispanic Other	—	—	—	—	—	—	—	<0.1%	0.2%	0.3%	0.4%	0.2%	0.3%	0.3%	0.3%	0.8%
Non-Hispanic Two or more races	—	—	—	—	—	—	—	—	—	—	—	—	—	3.0%	2.9%	5.2%
— White and Asian	—	—	—	—	—	—	—	—	—	—	—	(0.5%) (Note: Those listing European and Asian ancestry in the first and second responses to the Census ancestry question. (Multiple responses to the Census race question were not allowed before 2000.))	(0.6%)	1.0%	1.5%	2.3%
— White and Black	—	—	—	—	—	—	—	—	—	—	—	(0.1%) (Note: Those listing European and African or African-American ancestry in the first and second responses to the Census ancestry question.)	(<0.1%)	0.2%	0.3%	0.6%

Source: US Census and IPUMS USA

Birthplace	1842	1852	1860	1880	1900	1910	1920	1930	1940	1950	1960	1970	1980	1990	2000	2010	2020
United States	5.6%	45.9%	49.8%	55.5%	65.2%	65.6%	69.9%	72.3%	77.0%	81.2%	79.8%	76.3%	70.5%	64.6%	61.6%	61.8%	65.8%
— California (Note: In 1850 or later.)	—	2.1%	15.7%	33.2%	45.8%	43.8%	44.9%	44.3%	47.2%	42.5%	41.8%	39.7%	36.8%	35.3%	34.2%	37.6%	41.5%
— Other Northern/Western U.S. (Note: Excluding in Nevada, Utah, Arizona, or New Mexico before 1850.)	5.1%	36.1%	29.1%	19.8%	17.3%	19.0%	21.7%	24.3%	25.3%	27.3%	27.6%	27.0%	23.7%	20.9%	20.1%	18.0%	18.2%
— Southern U.S. (Note: Excluding Texas before 1850.)	0.5%	7.7%	5.0%	2.5%	2.1%	2.8%	3.3%	3.6%	4.5%	11.3%	10.4%	9.6%	10.1%	8.4%	7.2%	6.2%	6.1%
Other Anglosphere	3.6%	29.8%	24.3%	19.6%	13.4%	10.7%	8.4%	7.1%	5.5%	2.9%	2.9%	2.9%	1.7%	1.6%	1.9%	2.3%	2.3%
— Britain	2.6%	14.1%	5.6%	4.3%	3.7%	3.4%	2.9%	2.5%	1.9%	1.3%	1.0%	1.0%	0.6%	0.5%	0.7%	0.7%	0.9%
— Ireland	1.0%	11.3%	16.6%	13.2%	7.7%	5.6%	3.6%	2.7%	1.9%	1.1%	0.8%	0.8%	0.4%	0.4%	0.4%	0.6%	0.4%
— Canada, Australia, or New Zealand	—	4.4%	2.1%	2.1%	2.0%	1.7%	1.9%	1.9%	1.7%	1.5%	1.1%	1.1%	0.7%	0.7%	0.8%	1.0%	1.0%
Other Europe or Central Asia	1.5%	14.5%	18.6%	14.8%	16.7%	19.9%	18.2%	16.0%	13.5%	8.8%	9.1%	6.3%	4.8%	3.8%	4.3%	3.9%	3.6%
— Former Soviet Union	—	0.1%	0.1%	0.2%	0.4%	1.1%	1.2%	1.4%	1.4%	1.2%	1.3%	1.0%	1.0%	1.1%	1.9%	1.5%	1.3%
— Germany or Austria	—	6.4%	10.7%	8.7%	7.9%	6.9%	4.4%	3.3%	2.8%	1.6%	1.9%	1.3%	1.0%	0.7%	0.6%	0.6%	0.8%
— France or Belgium	0.5%	5.2%	4.0%	1.9%	1.5%	1.6%	1.5%	1.1%	0.8%	0.5%	0.5%	0.5%	0.3%	0.4%	0.3%	0.4%	0.7%
— Netherlands, Switzerland, or Nordic Countries	1.0%	1.4%	2.0%	2.2%	3.8%	4.5%	3.6%	3.2%	2.5%	1.7%	1.4%	0.7%	0.4%	0.4%	0.4%	0.4%	0.3%
— Italy	—	0.5%	0.8%	1.1%	2.2%	4.1%	4.8%	4.4%	3.8%	2.3%	2.2%	1.2%	1.0%	0.5%	0.3%	0.4%	0.2%
— Southeast Europe	—	0.1%	0.1%	0.1%	0.2%	1.0%	1.3%	1.3%	1.2%	0.8%	0.9%	0.9%	0.5%	0.3%	0.3%	0.3%	0.1%
— Spain or Portugal	—	0.3%	0.3%	0.2%	0.2%	0.5%	0.7%	0.5%	0.4%	0.5%	0.3%	0.2%	0.2%	0.2%	0.1%	0.2%	0.1%
— Poland, Czechia, or Slovakia	—	0.3%	0.6%	0.4%	0.3%	0.1%	0.6%	0.6%	0.5%	0.2%	0.4%	0.4%	0.3%	0.2%	0.2%	0.2%	0.0%
Asia-Pacific	0.5%	0.7%	4.8%	9.0%	3.7%	2.9%	2.0%	2.6%	2.4%	2.4%	4.5%	8.8%	15.0%	20.0%	22.8%	22.9%	20.0%
— China	—	0.4%	4.7%	8.9%	3.2%	1.8%	0.9%	1.4%	1.4%	1.4%	2.4%	4.0%	7.2%	10.6%	12.8%	13.0%	11.7%
—— (Hong Kong or Taiwan)	—	—	—	—	—	—	—	—	—	—	—	—	(1.7%)	(2.5%)	(2.9%)	(2.3%)	(2.1%)
— Philippines	0.5%	0.1%	<0.1%	<0.1%	<0.1%	<0.1%	0.3%	0.6%	0.5%	0.5%	1.4%	2.7%	4.4%	4.2%	4.2%	3.4%	3.1%
— India	—	<0.1%	<0.1%	<0.1%	<0.1%	<0.1%	<0.1%	<0.1%	<0.1%	0.1%	<0.1%	0.3%	0.5%	0.6%	0.9%	1.4%	1.6%
— Vietnam	—	—	—	—	—	—	—	—	—	—	—	<0.1%	1.0%	2.0%	2.1%	2.1%	1.4%
— Korea	—	—	—	—	<0.1%	<0.1%	<0.1%	<0.1%	<0.1%	—	<0.1%	0.1%	0.5%	0.8%	0.7%	1.1%	1.0%
— Japan	—	—	<0.1%	<0.1%	0.5%	1.0%	0.8%	0.6%	0.4%	0.3%	0.4%	0.7%	0.8%	0.7%	0.8%	0.7%	0.4%
Latin America or Caribbean	88.8%	9.0%	1.9%	1.0%	0.6%	0.6%	1.3%	1.8%	1.3%	1.6%	2.7%	4.5%	5.6%	7.7%	8.2%	7.9%	6.8%
— Mexico (Note: Including California, Nevada, Utah, Arizona, New Mexico, and Texas before 1850.)	88.3%	6.1%	1.5%	0.7%	0.7%	0.5%	0.8%	1.1%	0.8%	0.9%	0.9%	1.5%	1.9%	2.3%	2.8%	3.1%	2.4%
— El Salvador	—	<0.1%	—	—	<0.1%	<0.1%	<0.1%	0.1%	0.1%	0.1%	0.4%	1.1%	1.1%	2.1%	2.0%	1.3%	1.4%
— Other Central America	—	<0.1%	0.1%	0.1%	<0.1%	<0.1%	0.1%	0.3%	0.2%	0.4%	0.7%	1.1%	1.4%	1.9%	1.9%	1.6%	1.5%
— South America	0.5%	2.6%	0.6%	0.2%	0.1%	0.1%	0.2%	0.2%	0.2%	0.1%	0.3%	0.5%	0.6%	0.9%	1.0%	1.3%	1.3%
— Caribbean	—	<0.1%	0.2%	0.1%	0.1%	0.1%	0.2%	0.1%	0.1%	0.1%	0.4%	0.3%	0.6%	0.5%	0.4%	0.4%	0.2%
Middle East or North Africa	—	<0.1%	<0.1%	<0.1%	0.1%	0.1%	0.1%	0.2%	0.2%	0.2%	0.4%	0.3%	0.7%	0.9%	0.9%	0.8%	1.0%
Sub-Saharan Africa	—	0.1%	<0.1%	<0.1%	<0.1%	<0.1%	<0.1%	<0.1%	<0.1%	<0.1%	0.1%	<0.1%	0.1%	0.2%	0.3%	0.3%	0.4%
Born Outside the United States	94.4%	54.1%	50.2%	44.5%	34.8%	34.4%	30.1%	27.7%	23.0%	18.8%	20.2%	23.7%	29.5%	35.4%	38.4%	38.2%	34.2%
Born Outside California	—	95.9%	83.9%	66.7%	54.0%	56.1%	55.1%	55.7%	52.8%	57.5%	58.2%	60.3%	63.2%	64.7%	65.8%	62.4%	58.5%

Source: 1842 San Francisco Census, 1852 California Census, US Census, and IPUMS USA

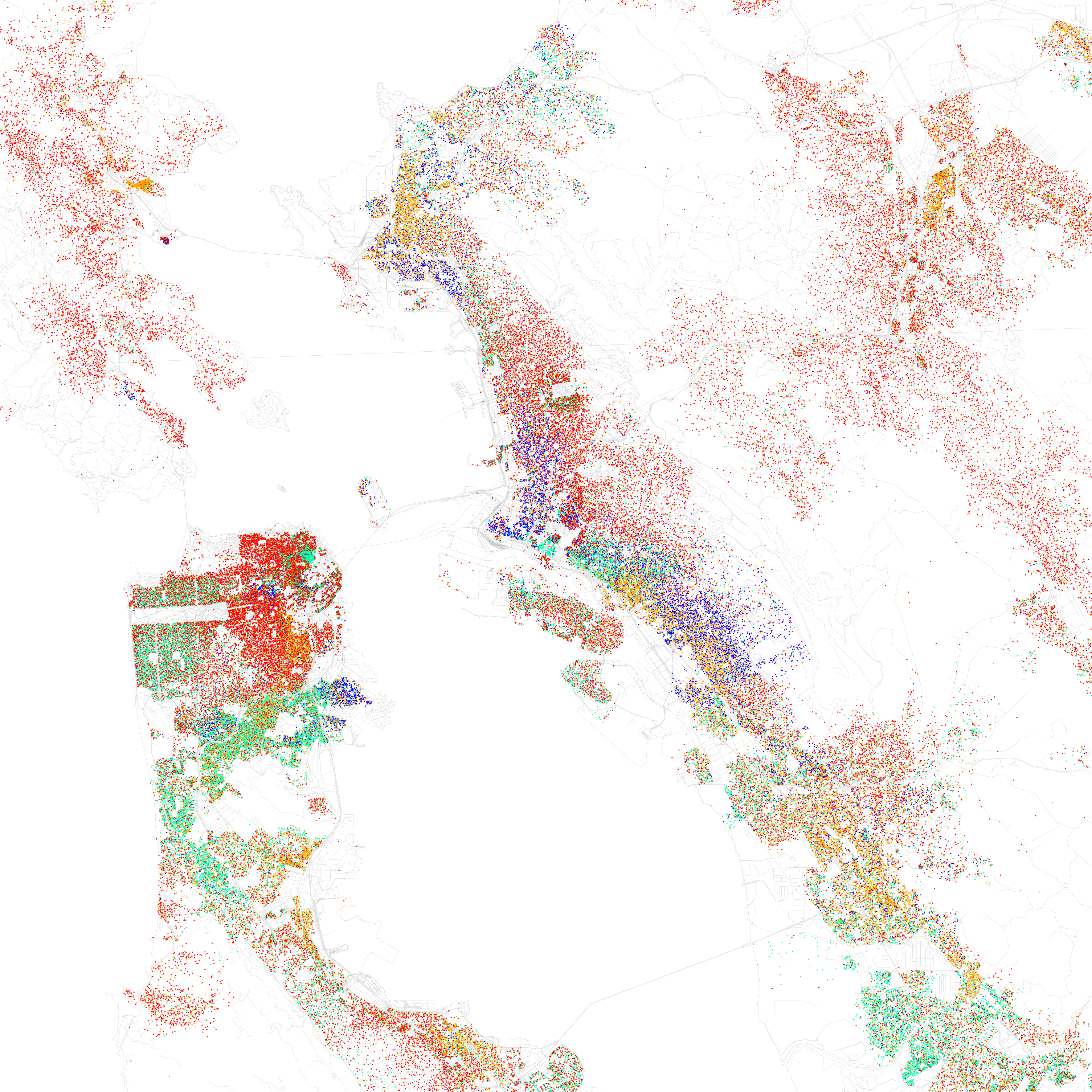
Map of racial distribution in San Francisco Bay Area, 2010 U.S. Census. Each dot is 25 people: White, Black, Asian, Hispanic, or Other (yellow)

=== 2019 United States Census Bureau American Community Survey estimates ===
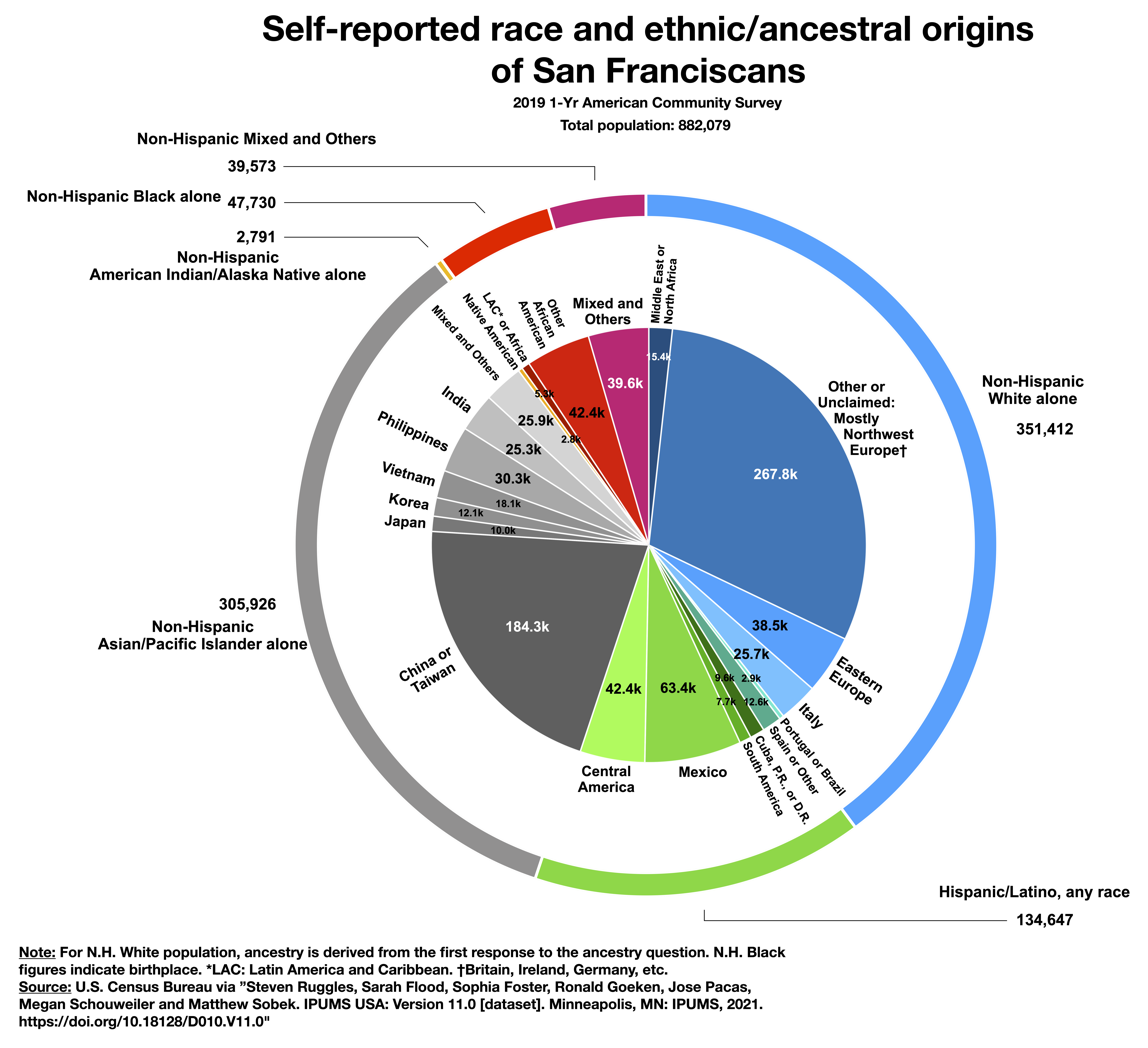
Race and ethnic/ancestral origins of San Franciscans, 2019	Racial Makeup of San Francisco (2019): 1. White alone (45.2%); 2. Black alone (5.47%); 3. Native American alone (0.40%); 4. Asian alone (34.9%); 5. Pacific Islander alone (0.43%); 6. Some other race alone (7.89%); 7. Two or more races (5.69%)	Racial/Ethnic Makeup of San Francisco excluding Hispanics from Racial Categories (2019); NH=Non-Hispanic: 1. White NH (39.8%); 2. Black NH (5.23%); 3. Native American NH (0.28%); 4. Asian NH (34.6%); 5. Pacific Islander NH (0.40%); 6. Other race NH (0.41%); 7. Two or more races NH (4.06%); 8. Hispanic Any Race (15.2%)	Racial Makeup of Hispanics in San Francisco (2019): 1. White alone (35.5%); 2. Black alone (1.61%); 3. Native American alone (0.82%); 4. Asian alone (2.18%); 5. Pacific Islander alone (0.18%); 6. Other race alone (49.1%); 7. Two or more races (10.7%)

According to 2019 American Community Survey annual estimates conducted by the US Census Bureau, San Francisco's population was 45.2% European American (39.8% Non-Hispanic White and 5.4% Hispanic White), 5.5% Black or African American, 34.9% Asian, 7.9% Some Other Race, 0.4% Native American and Alaskan Native, 0.4% Pacific Islander and 5.7% from two or more races.

The White population continues to remain the largest racial category in San Francisco and includes the 35.5% of Hispanics who self-identify as White. The remainder of Hispanics self-identify as Other Race (49.1%), Multiracial (10.7%), American Indian and Alaskan Native (0.8%), Black (1.6%), Asian (2.2%), and Hawaiian and Pacific Islander (0.2%).

Asian Americans remain the largest minority group at either 34.9% (including Asian Hispanics) or 34.6% (excluding Asian Hispanics).

The Black population continues to decline and at 5.5% (including Black Hispanics) or 5.2% (excluding Black Hispanics) is well below the national average of 12.8% (including Black Hispanics). The Black population peaked in the 1970 Census at 13.4%.

If Hispanics are treated as a separate category from race, San Francisco's population was 39.8% European, 34.6% Asian, 15.2% Hispanic-Latino, 5.2% Black or African American, 0.4% Some Other Race, 0.3% Native American and Alaskan Native, 0.4% Pacific Islander and 4.1% from two or more races. By ethnicity, 15.2% of the total population is Hispanic-Latino (of any race), below the national average of 18.4%. If treated as a category separate from race, Hispanics are the third largest minority group in San Francisco County.

The largest ancestry group of Hispanics in San Francisco are of Mexican descent (52.7% of Hispanics) followed by Salvadoran descent (12.0% of Hispanics), Nicaraguan descent (8.0%), Guatemalan descent (5.3%), Puerto Rican descent (3.7%), Spaniard descent (2.9%), Peruvian descent (2.8%), Chilean descent (1.4%), Colombian descent (1.4%), Cuban descent (1.3%), Argentinian descent (1.1%), and those of other Hispanic ethnicity or of mixed Hispanic ethnicity (7.4%).

=== Indigenous Americans ===
During the Spanish mission period, from the late 1700s to 1830, the indigenous people of the East Bay were enslaved, relocated and decimated by disease, leading to their disappearance. The White Americans who came after the Spanish had an even more extreme policy of genocide towards Native Americans; dubbed a "war of extermination" by California governors, which saw the demise of the remaining indigenous inhabitants of the Bay Area, often by state-sponsored violence. The Association of Ramaytush Ohlone claims to represent the remaining decedents of the Ramaytush Ohlone, the indigenous people of the peninsula. According to their website, one lineage of their people survive, originating from what is now Pacifica, California.

=== European Americans ===
As of July 2019, European Americans in San Francisco are 45.2% of the population of San Francisco. Non-Hispanic whites are 39.8% of the population.

There is a French community in San Francisco.

There is an Italian community in North Beach.

There is an Irish community in San Francisco.

==== Neighborhoods ====
The neighborhoods that have the highest percentage of non-Hispanic white residents are Marina (78.2%), Cow Hollow (76.8%), Parnassus - Ashbury (74.1%), Eureka Valley - Dolores Heights - Castro (73.8%), and Noe Valley (72.0%).

The neighborhoods with the lowest percentage of non-Hispanic white residents are Visitacion Valley (5.5%) and Silver Terrace (7.0%).

==== Education ====
White students make up only 12.9% of San Francisco public school students, despite white people constituting 41.6% of the city's population. Although this discrepancy is explained somewhat by white residents being older on average than residents of other ethnic groups, the more important reason is that white students are disproportionately likely to be enrolled in private school. This is increasingly the case in higher levels of education, with only 8.9% of the public high school population being white.

=== African Americans ===
Those who identify solely as African American made up 5.2% of the population in 2019. Those who include partial non-black ancestry make up 6.4% of the city's population. Neighborhoods with significant black populations include Fillmore District, Hunters Point, and Visitacion Valley.

=== Asian Americans ===
San Francisco is about 35% Asian, with 23% being Chinese. Chinatown, Richmond District and Sunset District have significant Chinese populations. Japanese communities are found in Japantown and Sunset District. Vietnamese community is concentrated in Chinatown, Tenderloin, Richmond, and Sunset. The Filipino community is concentrated in Crocker Amazon and Soma.

The Asian population of the San Francisco Bay Area has a very high rate of marriage with people of other races, with most interracial marriages involving White Americans. In some ethnic groups, such as American-born Chinese, the outmarriage rate is 80%. The Japanese population of the South Bay is diverse, and many have mixed-race backgrounds due to the growing trend of inter-racial marriages. According to a study conducted by Japanese American Citizens League, between 2000 and 2009, the mixed race Japanese population in San Jose grew by 27.3%, while the mono-racial Japanese population declined.

== Education, households, and income ==
Of all major cities in the United States, San Francisco has the second-highest percentage of residents with a college degree, behind only Seattle. Over 44% of adults within the city limits have a bachelor's or higher degree. USA Today reported that Rob Pitingolo, a researcher who measured college graduates per square mile, found that San Francisco had the highest rate at 7,031 per square mile, or over 344,000 total graduates in the city's 46.7 square miles (121 km^{2}).

The Census reported that 780,971 people (97.0% of the population) lived in households, 18,902 (2.3%) lived in non-institutionalized group quarters, and 5,362 (0.7%) were institutionalized. There were 345,811 households, out of which 63,577 (18.4%) had children under the age of 18 living in them, 109,437 (31.6%) were opposite-sex married couples living together, 28,844 (8.3%) had a female householder with no spouse present, 12,748 (3.7%) had a male householder with no spouse present. There were 21,677 (6.3%) unmarried opposite-sex partnerships, and 10,384 (3.0%) same-sex married couples or partnerships. 133,366 households (38.6%) were made up of individuals, and 34,234 (9.9%) had someone living alone who was 65 years of age or older. The average household size was 2.26. There were 151,029 families (43.7% of all households); the average family size was 3.11. There were 376,942 housing units, at an average density of 1,625.5 per square mile (627.6/km^{2}), of which 123,646 (35.8%) were owner-occupied, and 222,165 (64.2%) were occupied by renters. The homeowner vacancy rate was 2.3%; the rental vacancy rate was 5.4%. 327,985 people (40.7% of the population) lived in owner-occupied housing units and 452,986 people (56.3%) lived in rental housing units.

According to the 2005 American Community Survey, San Francisco has the highest percentage of gay and lesbian individuals of any of the 50 largest U.S. cities, at 15.4%. San Francisco also has the highest percentage of same-sex households of any American county, with the Bay Area having a higher concentration than any other metropolitan area.

Income in 2011
Per capita income	$46,777
Median household income	$72,947
Median family income	$87,329

San Francisco ranks third of American cities in median household income with a 2007 value of $65,519. Median family income is $81,136, and the San Francisco Bay Area ranks 8th in the number of billionaires known in the region. Following a national trend, an emigration of middle-class families is contributing to widening income disparity and has left the city with a lower proportion of children, 14.5%, than any other large American city.

The city's poverty rate is 11.8% and the number of families in poverty stands at 7.4%, both lower than the national average. The unemployment rate stands at 4.8% in the greater San Francisco Bay Area as of January 2015.

== Homelessness ==
Homelessness has been a chronic and controversial problem for San Francisco since the early 1980s as a result of deinstitutionalization, rising housing costs, and cutbacks to social programs. The homeless population is estimated to be 13,500 with 6,500 living on the streets. The city is believed to have the highest number of homeless inhabitants per capita of any major U.S. city. Rates of reported violent and property crimes for 2009 (736 and 4,262 incidents per 100,000 residents, respectively) are slightly lower than for similarly sized U.S. cities.

== Languages and ages ==
In 2024, the most spoken languages in San Francisco were English (446,434, or 56.15% of the population), Chinese (131,407, or 16.53%), Spanish (89,338, or 11.24%), Tagalog (24,788, or 3.12%), Vietnamese (14,043, or 1.77%), French (9,968, or 1.25% of the population), Hindi (8,731, or 1.1%), (Note: excludes 503 Urdu speakers, making up 0.06% of the city. Hindi and Urdu are considered mutually intelligible registers of the same language.) Korean (8,185, or 1.03%), Russian (7,754, or 0.98%), Japanese (6,842, or 0.86%), German (5,118, or 0.64%), and Italian (3,861, or 0.49%).

In 1910, the most spoken languages in San Francisco were English (234,465, or 56.24% of the population), (Note: Sum of all 117,464 respondents "of foreign stock" (either foreign-born or with at least one foreign-born parent) who listed "White" as their ethnicity and "English" as their mother tongue, all 115,359 who listed "White" as their ethnicity and were native-born to native-born parents, and all 1,642 respondents who listed "Negro" as their ethnicity.) German (70,045, or 16.8%), Italian (30,893, or 7.41%), French (13,655, or 3.28%), Swedish (12,080, or 2.9%), Chinese (10,582, or 2.54%), Danish (5,708, or 1.37%), Spanish (5,705, or 1.37%), Norwegian (5,563, or 1.33%), Yiddish (5,254, or 1.26%), and Japanese (4,518, or 1.08%).

The age distribution of the city was as follows: 107,524 people (13.4%) under the age of 18, 77,664 people (9.6%) aged 18 to 24, 301,802 people (37.5%) aged 25 to 44, 208,403 people (25.9%) aged 45 to 64, and 109,842 people (13.6%) who were 65 years of age or older. The median age was 38.5 years. For every 100 females, there were 102.9 males. For every 100 females age 18 and over, there were 102.8 males.

== Religion ==
Religion in San Francisco (2014)
1. No religion (35.0%)
2. Roman Catholicism (25.0%)
3. Protestantism (20.0%)
4. Mormonism (1.00%)
5. Eastern Orthodoxy (1.00%)
6. Other Christian (1.00%)
7. Judaism (3.00%)
8. Islam (1.00%)
9. Hinduism (5.00%)
10. Buddhism (2.00%)
11. Other religion (4.00%)
12. Don't know (2.00%)

According to a Pew Research study conducted in 2014, the religious demographics of San Francisco are as follows:

- Christianity 48%
  - Catholicism 25%
  - Protestantism 20%
    - Evangelical Protestantism 10%
    - Mainline Protestantism 6%
    - Historically Black Protestant 4%
  - Mormonism 1%
  - Eastern Orthodoxy 1%
  - Other Christian 1%
- Irreligion 35%
- Others 15%
  - Hinduism 5%
  - Judaism 3%
  - Buddhism 2%
  - Islam 1%
  - Other religion 4%
- Don't know 2%
