= Katy Pyle =

American ballet dancer and choreographer

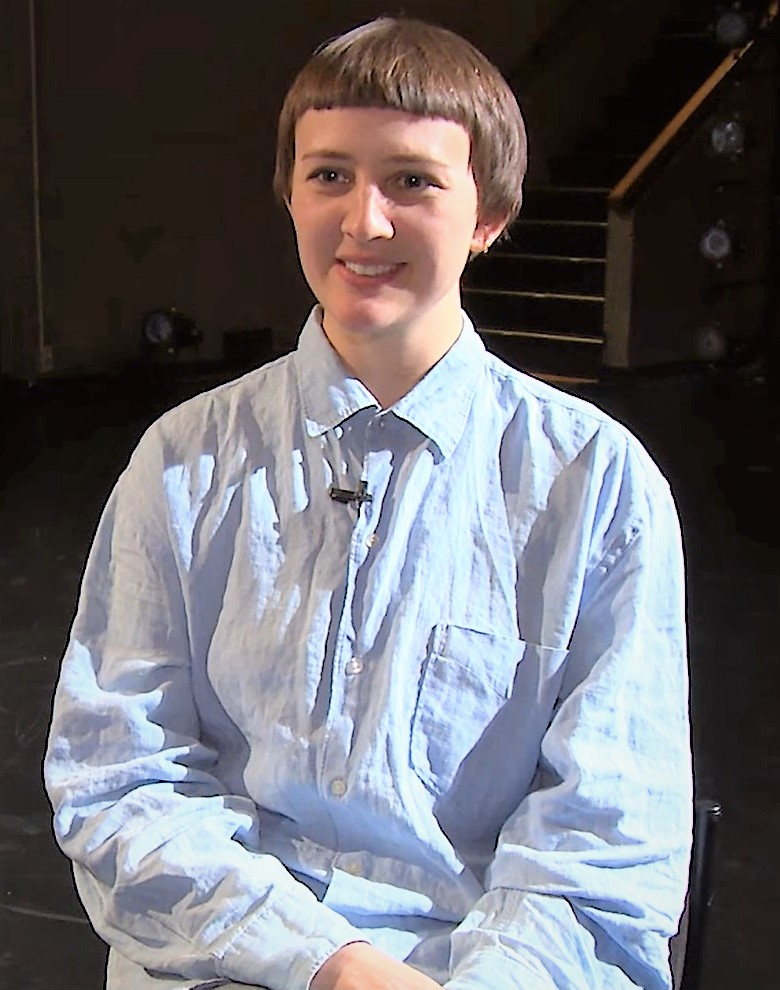
Pyle in 2015

Katy Pyle is an American ballet dancer and choreographer. They are the founder and artistic director of Ballez.

== Early life and education ==
Pyle began studying ballet at the age of 3 and danced with the Texas Youth Ballet. When they were 13 years old, they joined the Austin Contemporary Ballet as an apprentice.

A year later, they enrolled as a full-time student in pre-professional ballet at the North Carolina School of the Arts in Winston-Salem. While training in North Carolina, Pyle was pressured to change their major from classical ballet to contemporary dance due to their body type and movement style. During their contemporary training, Pyle began studying choreography as a discipline. Pyle graduated from the School of the Arts in 1999. They graduated summa cum laude from Hollins University with a bachelor's degree in multimedia performance art in 2002.

== Career ==
While an undergraduate student at Hollins University, Pyle performed as a drag king and explored post-modern dance forms. After graduating from college, they moved to New York City and danced for companies and in individual works for Ivy Baldwin, Faye Driscoll, John Jasperse, Xavier Le Roy, Karinne Keithley, Jennifer Monson, Anna Sperber, Katie Workum, and Young Jean Lee. Pyle began choreographing in collaborations with Eleanor Hullihan, Rebecca Brooks, and Jules Skloot during this time, including the works Salute to Ex-Best Friends, Galapagos, The Lady Centaur Show, PS 112, THE WAY: You Make Me Feel, and COVERS.

In 2011, Pyle founded Ballez, an LGBTQ ballet company based in Brooklyn. With Ballez, Pyle teaches adult ballet classes at the Brooklyn Arts Exchange and has travelled with the program to Princeton University, Yale University, Allied Media Conference, Movement Research, CounterPULSE, Irreverent Dance, University Musical Society, New York University, Sarah Lawrence College, and the Beyond Tolerance Youth Conference. Pyle serves as the Artistic Director of Ballez and has danced with and choreographed for the company in major works including The Firebird, a Ballez, Variations on Virtuosity, a Gala with the Stars of Ballez, and Sleeping Beauty & the Beast. Pyle also choreographed Slavic Goddesses on six soloists with Ballez for a performance series at the Kitchen as a collaboration with Paulina Olowska. In January 2018, Pyle created a pas de deux for PILLOWTALK with Kyoung H. Park at The Tank, which travelled to Chicago in August 2018.

Pyle teaches ballet practices at The New School's Eugene Lang College of Liberal Arts and has set Ballez choreography on students at Bowdoin College, Whitman College, and Beloit College as a guest artist in residence.

== Personal life ==
Pyle is genderqueer and a lesbian.
