= Botetourt Springs, Virginia =

Botetourt Springs
- Former settlement and resort
- Location within Virginia
- Coordinates: 37°21′13″N 79°56′12″W
- Country: United States
- State: Virginia
- County: Roanoke County

Botetourt Springs (originally: Sulphur Spring Tract) is a mineral spring and was a historical settlement on the border of Roanoke County, Virginia, and Botetourt County, Virginia, United States. The spring is located 12 mi (19 km) from Fincastle. Botetourt Springs was originally settled in the mid-18th century, growing as a mineral spring resort during the summer, especially after the 1820s.

In its time, it was one of the best known mineral springs in Virginia, and one of the chief sulfuric thermal springs in America. Notable visitors included General Andrew Jackson and General Lafayette.

== Geography ==
Botetourt Springs has two springs, one of sulfur and the other of chalybeate. An 1857 book mentioned that Botetourt Springs was a notable resort during the warmer months and that the springs contained magnesia, sulfur and carbonic acid".

== History ==
The Carvin Lands on Carvin Creek was a 150-acre parcel granted to William Carvin in 1746. Carvin expanded the acreage and his son, William Carvin II, inherited the property.

Edward Carvin inherited the Sulphur Springs homeplace and approximately 900 acres from his father, William Carvin II, in 1804. Edward sold the homeplace and 474 acres to Christian and Martin Wingart who sold the land to Charles Johnston in two transactions between 1818 and 1826. Around 1820, Johnston built a hotel and cottages around the spring, naming it Botetourt Springs after the county in which it was located. Andrew Jackson was a visitor, as was General Lafayette in 1824.

With the increase in travel on the road west, the hotel and its springs stayed popular through the 1830s. Johnston died in 1833 and was buried on the property. By 1839, with the opening of other hotels in the area, the popularity of Botetourt Springs ebbed and it was closed in 1839.

Johnston's nephew, Edward Johnston, bought the property and converted the hotel to a school, the Roanoke Female Seminary. This seminary was unsuccessful.

In 1842, the property, including the buildings and 600 acres, was purchased by an agent for Valley Union Seminary, a Baptist organization. The seminary, founded in the same year, became Hollins University. William Carver's spring house still stands on the property.

By 1873, Botetourt Springs had a post office. It was accessible by travelling nine miles on a turnpike that led from the Virginia and Tennessee Railroad.

Today, it is part of the suburb of Oldfields in northern Roanoke.

== Notable people ==
- William Henry Roberts (1847-1919), missionary in Burma
