= Asian Hispanic and Latino Americans =

Americans of Asian and Latin American ancestry

Asian Hispanic and Latino Americans Estadounidenses hispanos y latinos asiáticos
Total population
- 598,146 as of the 2010 United States census including multiracial persons 0.2% of the total US population (2010); 4.1% of all Asian Americans (2010); 1.2% of all Latino Americans (2010)

Regions with significant populations
- West Coast, Southwestern United States, Northeastern United States, Florida

Languages
- American English, Spanish language in the United States, Spanglish, American Portuguese, Portuglish, Asian Languages, Indigenous languages of the Americas

Religion
- Christianity, predominantly Roman Catholicism; Minority Buddhism, Hinduism, Islam, Taoism, Shintoism, Zoroastrianism, Sikhism, Jainism

Related ethnic groups
- Asian Latin Americans, Punjabi Mexican Americans, Asian Americans, Latino Americans

Asian Hispanic and Latino Americans, also called Asian Hispanics or Asian Latinos, are Americans of Asian ancestry and ancestry from Latin America. It also refers to Asians from Latin America that speak Spanish or Portuguese natively and immigrated to the United States. This includes Hispanic and Latino Americans who identify themselves (or were officially classified by the United States Census Bureau, Office of Management and Budget and other U.S. government agencies) as Asian Americans.

Hispanidad, which is independent of race, is the only ethnic category, as opposed to racial category, which is officially unified by the US Census Bureau. The distinction made by government agencies for those within the population of any official race category, including "Asian American", is between those who report Hispanic and Latino ethnic backgrounds and all others who do not. In the case of Asian Americans, these two groups are respectively termed Asian Hispanic and Latinos and non-Hispanic or Latino Asian Americans, the former being those who say Asian ancestry from Spain or Latin America and the latter consisting of an ethnically diverse collection of all others who are classified as Asian Americans that do not report Spanish or Latin American ethnic backgrounds.

== Population ==
In the 2000 US Census, 119,829 Hispanic and Latino Americans identified as being of Asian race alone. In 2006, the Census Bureau's American Community Survey estimated them at 154,694, while its Population Estimates, which are official, put them at 277,704. In the 2010 Census, there were 598,146 Asian Hispanic and Latino Americans, including those who are multiracial in origin.

Due to an 1849 decree, Filipino Americans often have Spanish surnames from the Alphabetical Catalog of Surnames. The Philippines was once the destination of immigration from Latin America to Asia back in the era of the Manila-Acapulco Galleons. Nevertheless, the vast majority of Filipino Americans, who number over two million, are counted as non-Hispanic; Hispanic Asians are typically limited to immigrants of Asian descent from Latin America, such as for example Chinese Cubans or Japanese Peruvians, and their children, as well as mixed-race individuals with one Hispanic and one Asian parent.

== Notable people ==
- Miguel del Aguila, American composer
- Jhené Aiko, singer
- Tatyana Ali, American actress and R&B singer
- Daniella Alonso, American actress
- Fred Armisen, American actor and comedian
- Tyson Beckford, American male model and actor
- Steve Caballero, pro skateboarder
- Franklin Chang-Díaz, former NASA astronaut
- Sonia Chang-Díaz, politician
- Alex Cabrera Suzuki, Venezuelan professional baseball player
- Chris Cheng, professional marksman
- Arthur Chin, United States Air Force pilot
- Sebastian Castro, actor, singer, visual artist and YouTube sensation
- Nikita Dragun, YouTuber, makeup artist, beauty influencer, TikToker
- Carlos Galvan, singer
- Mila J, singer, rapper and dancer
- Kelis, singer
- Kim Samuel, singer
- Lee Yoo-jin, South Korean actress of Korean and Latino-American descent
- Wallace Loh, President of the University of Maryland
- Kamala Lopez, American actress
- Chino Moreno, frontman of Deftones
- Asia Nitollano, singer
- Sigrid Nunez, writer
- Karen Olivo, Tony Award-winning actress
- Jae Park, musician, singer
- Kyoung H. Park, playwright
- Elmelindo Rodrigues Smith, Medal of Honor recipient
- Chino Rodriguez, Latin music record executive
- Tao Rodríguez-Seeger, musician
- Jessica Sanchez, singer
- Harry Shum Jr., actor
- Tony Succar, percussionist, composer, and producer
- Jasmine Villegas, singer
- Cassie Ventura, singer, model and actress
- Sparklmami, singer, songwriter, and record producer

== See also ==
- Asian Americans
- Punjabi Mexican Americans
- Latino
- List of Latino Americans
- White Latino Americans
- Black Latino Americans
