= Ola Hanson =

American linguist (1864–1929)

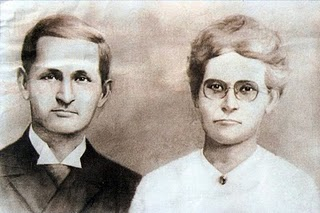
- Hanson and his wife c. 1900
- Born: June 25, 1864; Åhus, Sweden
- Died: October 17, 1929 (aged 65); Saint Paul, Minnesota, U.S.
- Occupation: Missionary

Ola Hanson (June 25, 1864, in Åhus, Sweden – October 17, 1929, in St. Paul, Minnesota) was a Swedish-American missionary who worked with the Kachin people in Burma. Hanson came to the United States in 1881, settling in Oakland, Nebraska. He attended the Swedish Baptist (later Bethel) Seminary in St. Paul, Minnesota, graduated from Madison Theological Seminary in Hamilton, New York, and was ordained in 1890.

Hanson was sent to Kachin State in 1890 by the American Baptist Missionary Union to help William Henry Roberts, who was running a Kachin mission in Bhamo city, and was followed in 1892 by George J. Geis, who established a mission at Myitkyina. His team formulated an orthography for the Kachin language using the Latin alphabet, and created a grammar and Katchin–English dictionary. He then began translating the Bible into Kachin. Hanson established a mission in Namkham in the Hsenwi District in 1910. He wrote The Kachins, Their Customs and Traditions (Rangoon, 1913) and Missionary Pioneers among the Kachins (New York, 1922). After living with the Kachin people for 28 years, he returned to his native Nebraska in 1928. He died in St. Paul, Minnesota, on October 17, 1929.
