= George J. Geis =

American Baptist minister and anthropologist

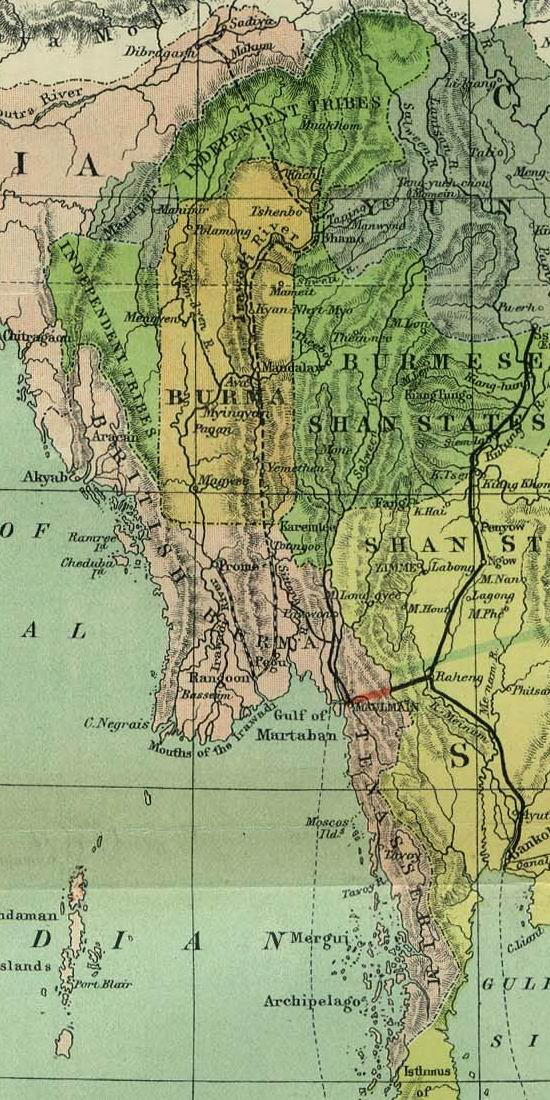
Burma in 1886. Geis worked in the northeast Kachin and eastern Shan states.

The Reverend George J. Geis (c. 1860 – October 28, 1936) was an American Baptist minister and anthropologist of German descent, best known for his missionary work in northeastern Burma. He promoted Christianity amongst the Kachin people, a group which he also studied, collecting general ethnographical data about them. He arrived in Burma with his wife in 1892, and spent most of the rest of his life there, establishing missions throughout Kachin State and Shan State. Geis is best known for his work in Myitkyina in Kachin State, but in the 1930s he established a mission in Kutkai in Shan State, and at the time of his death in 1936 was working there at the Kachin Bible Training School.

== Background ==
The American Baptist Eugenio Kincaid visited Burma in 1837. While distributing religious tracts and New Testaments among the villages north of Ava, Kincaid heard of a people named "Hka Khyens", who were said to believe in a supreme being. He appealed for other missionaries to come to preach to these people, but with no immediate result. However, in 1877 a Christian named Bogalay, from Bassein, began to learn the Jinghpaw language of the Kachins. In 1878, the first overseas Baptist missionary to the Kachins, Albert Lyon, arrived in Bhamo, but died of consumption within a month.

Lyon was succeeded by William Henry Roberts, a former soldier who had fought in the Confederate Army during the American Civil War. Roberts obtained grudging permission from the Burmese king, Thibaw Min, to build a school and educate the Kachins. Although his wife soon died from malaria, Roberts was to carry out his mission for 34 years. Ola Hanson, an accomplished linguist of Swedish origin, arrived in Katchinland in 1890 and was to remain for 38 years. He formulated an alphabet for the Jinghpaw language using the Latin script, prepared educational materials in the language as well as a grammar and a Jinghpaw-English dictionary, translated over 200 hymns into Jinghpaw and wrote a book on Katchins: Their Customs and Traditions (1913). Hanson also began work on a Jinghpaw translation of the Bible, translating St. John's Gospel within two years of his arrival.

== Early Burmese mission ==
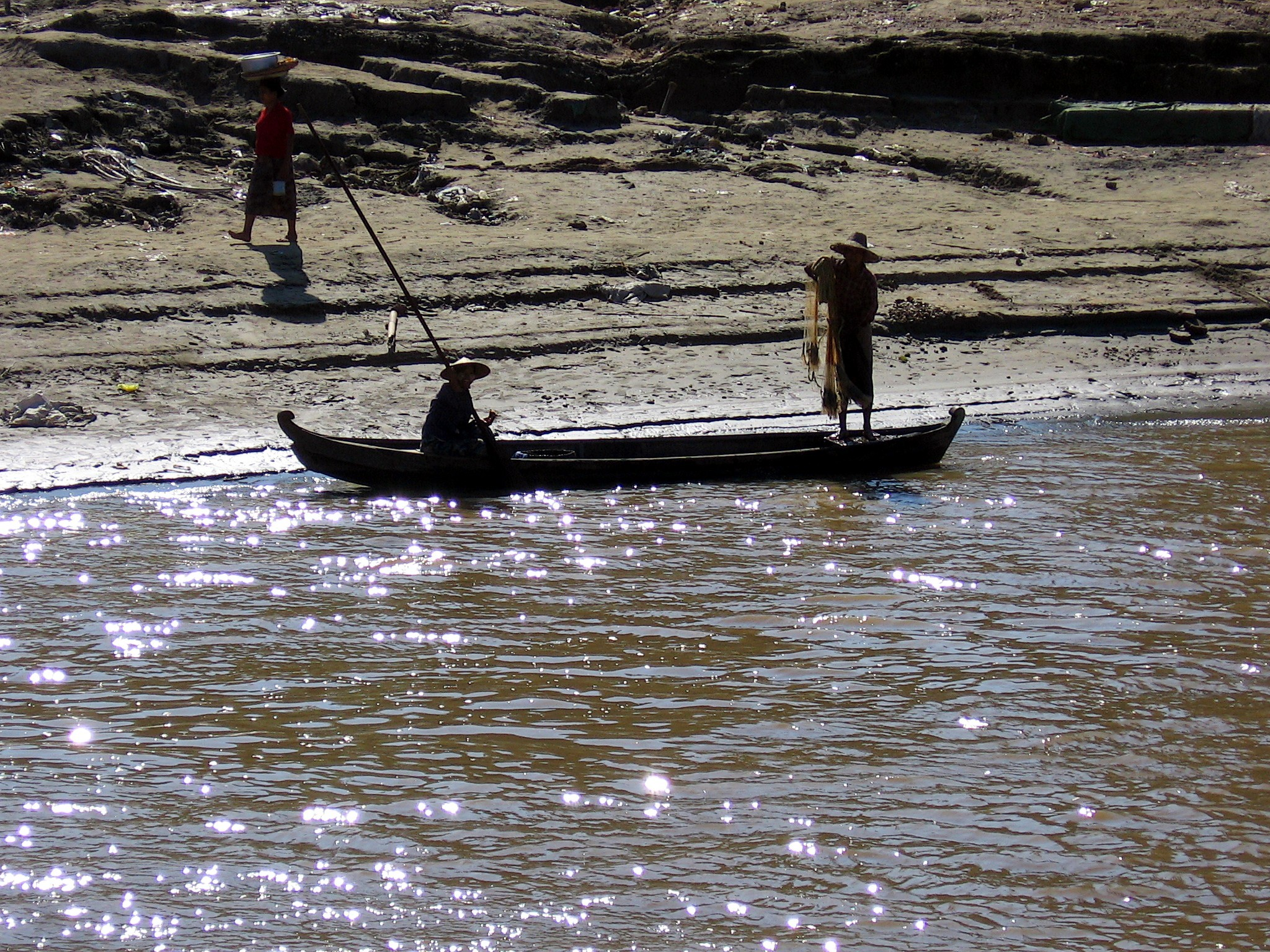
Kachin people on the Irrawaddy River

When Geis arrived with his wife in 1892 he was the third Baptist missionary in the area. Gies made the difficult journey up the Irrawaddy River in the rainy season, and decided to establish a mission at Myitkyina. This was planned to become the headquarters of the Kachin District and the northern terminus of the Burma Railway. The first buildings of Geis' new mission were built by Christian converts from Bhamo.

By 1894 Geis was able to report: "During the past year we have had many tokens of the Lord's blessings resting upon our work. Never have more Kachins come to us, and never have they shown a greater interest in the gospel message. Hundreds from the distant north as they came down to Myitkyina on bamboo rafts have for the first time heard the story of Jesus". He reported on his extensive travels, growing friendship with the local people, the opening of the first out-station in the mountains and the substantial and convenient site that the government had granted for the new mission compound. However, his report was written in the United States, to which he had been forced to temporarily return due to his wife's severe illness.

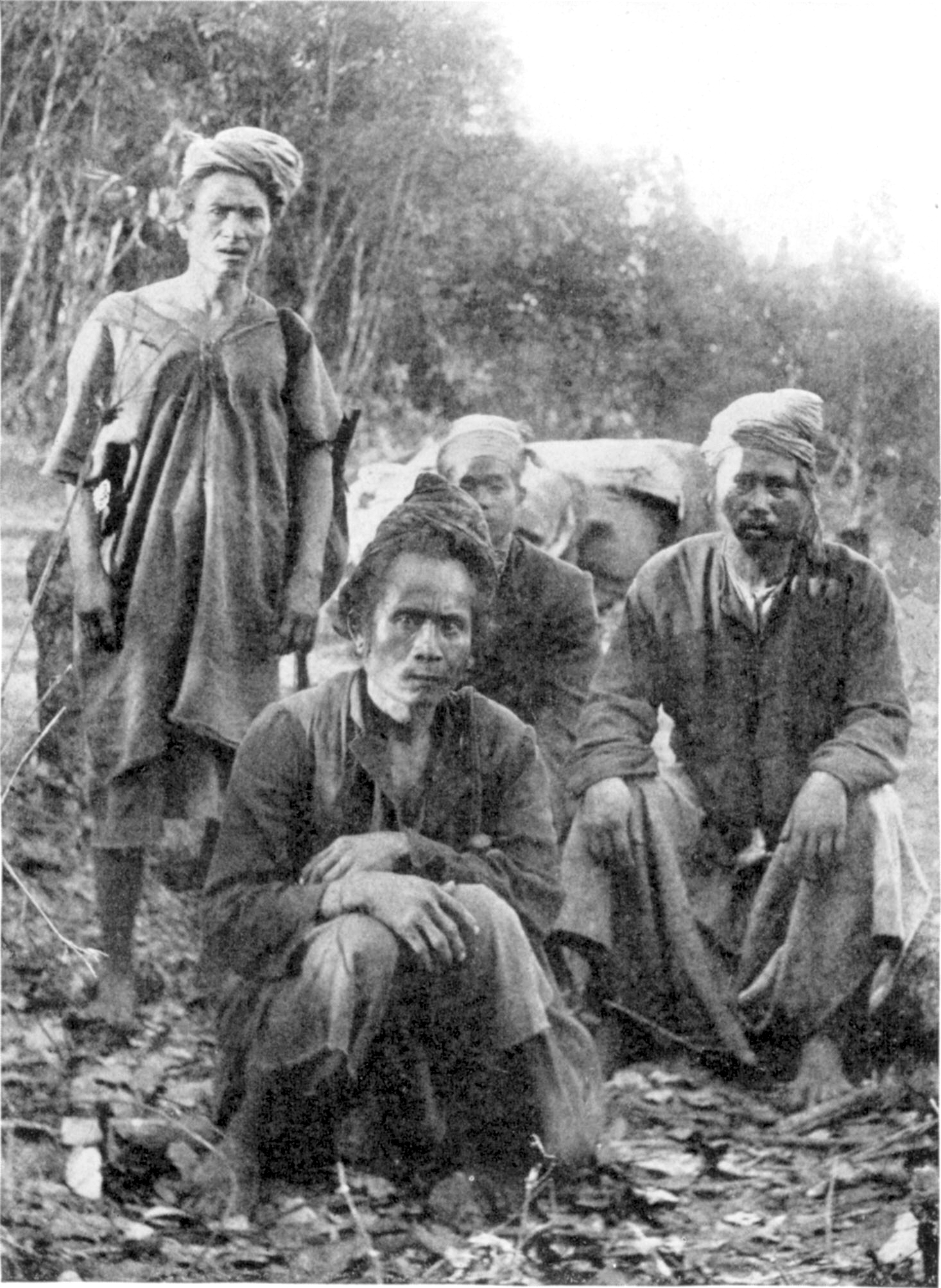
Karen men, 1922. Karen missionaries assisted Geis.

Geis's work was not confined to Kachins. He first visited a Lisu village is 1898. He was accompanied by Karen missionaries from the Karen Bible Seminary. He was the only Western missionary to visit the Lisu people in their mountain villages until 1910. In October 1902 he baptized his first Lisu converts, a couple named Ngwa Tar and Gu Na Du, and this was followed by further conversions. In 1906 the first Lisu church was built in Manhkring, a Kachin village located in the valley between Namhkam and Bhamo. The Lisu established their own village beside the Kachins, and became part of the Manhkring Kachin Baptist Church, although they held some services in their own tongue.

== Growth of local church leaders ==
On December 15, 1901, the first ordination council convened in the Kachin Hills. The candidates were Damau Naw, who had come as a school boy almost twenty years earlier, and after being educated in Rangoon had helped Hanson in his literary work since 1893; Ning Grawng, who had accompanied Geis since 1894 in the Myitkyina area; and Shwe So, a Karen missionary who had served since 1884. By 1911, there were more than 300 communicants of the Kachin Baptist Church, many of whom had been educated at the mission schools. More pastors were ordained in 1911, although foreign missionaries remained the leaders of the church for many years.

Ba Thaw (1891–1967), who had studied for his Bachelor of Arts in Calcutta, India, worked with Geis from 1911 and quickly became fluent in the Lisu and Kachin languages. He made great efforts to adapt to the Liu lifestyle, but realized that "a tribe having no literature cannot be improved much in education, social activities, and also in spiritual aspects." Ba Thaw visited Lisu villages in China, where he collaborated with James O. Fraser of the China Inland Mission to develop a Lisu alphabet using Romanized letters and translate central Christian texts. During a long and fruitful life he was an evangelist, pastor, and teacher.

== Later mission career ==
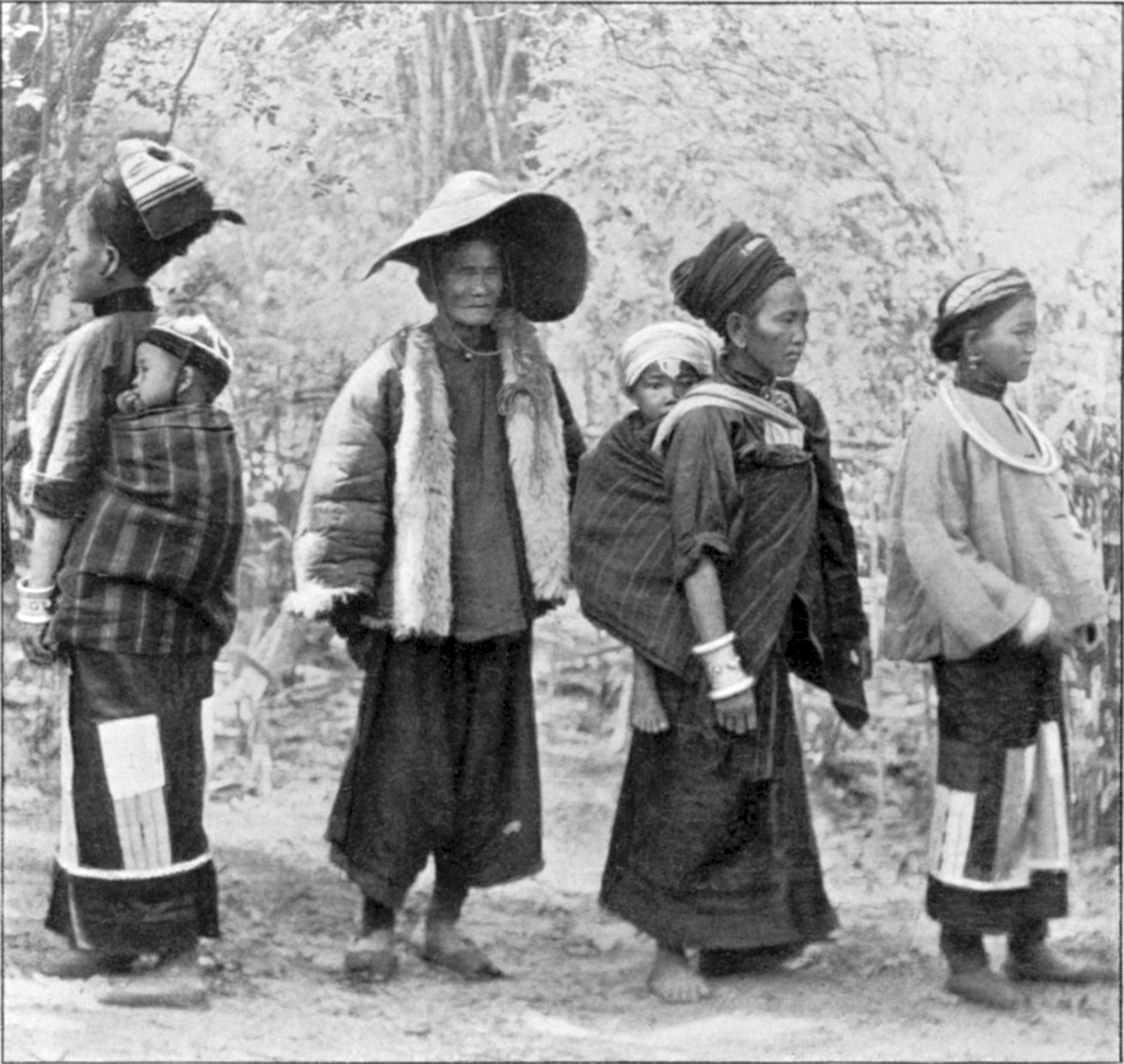
Shan people, 1902

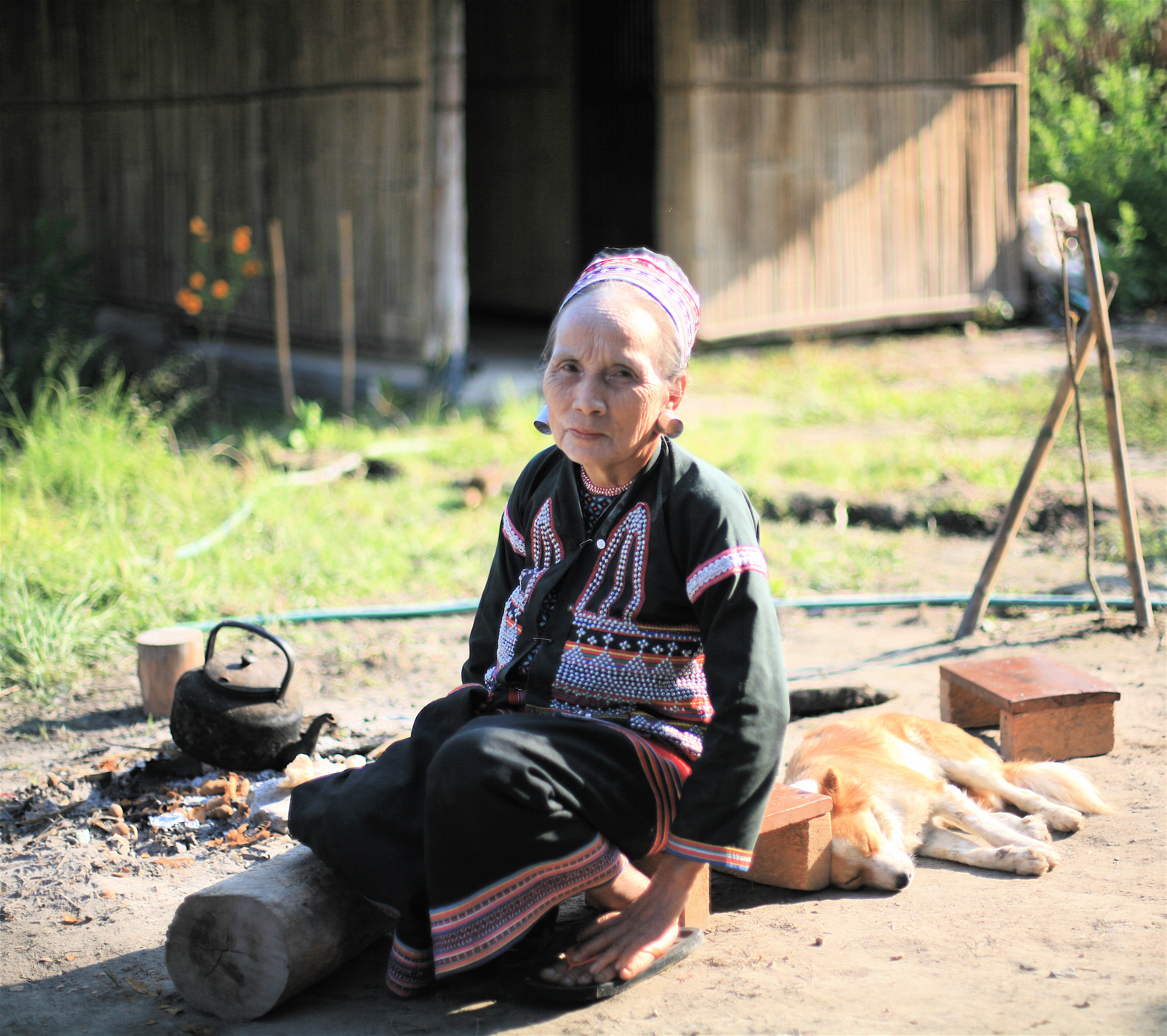
Elderly Lahu woman

The Geises were transferred to the Philippines in 1918, where they worked for four years. In 1922 they were able to return to their "first love" in Myitkyina, to work again among the hill tribes of Upper Burma. In the late 1920s, George Geis was planning to start a small bible school in the hills east of Bhamo to train additional workers to those who had completed the course at the Burmese Seminary at Insein. This area had shown increasing interest in the Baptist message, not only among the lowland Shan people, but also with the Lahus and Was in mountain villages east of Kengtung. There was a severe shortage of trained teachers.

In the 1930s Geis established a mission in Kutkai, and he was working there at the Kachin Bible Training School when he died in his seventies on 28 October 1936.
