= William Henry Roberts =

Baptist minister, missionary

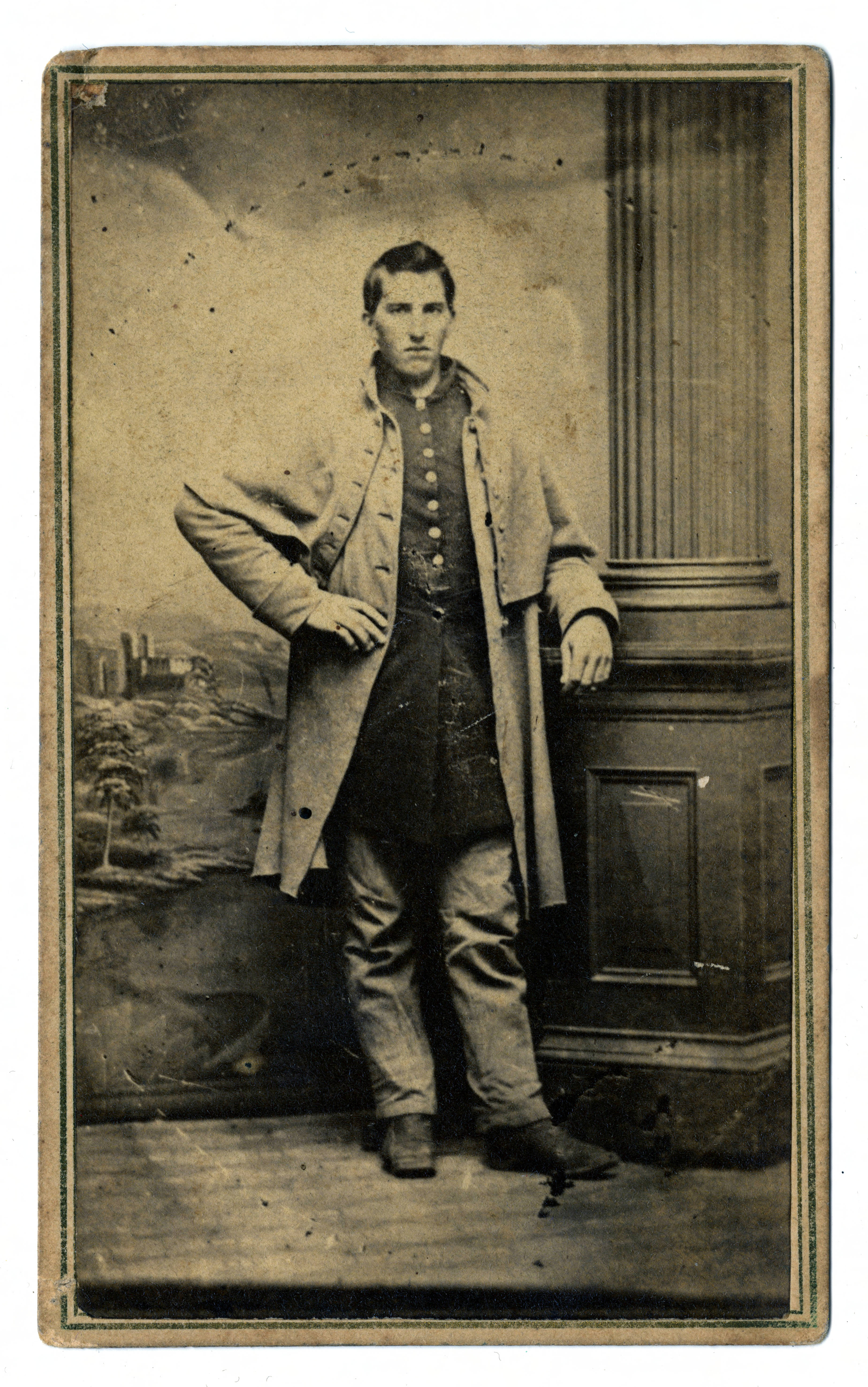
William Henry Roberts in the 1860s

William Henry Roberts (25 October 1847 – 24 December 1919) was a Baptist minister from the United States who worked for many years as a missionary in Burma.

== Biography ==
Roberts was born on 25 October 1847, in Botetourt Springs, Virginia. He studied at Roanoke College and Richmond College (now the University of Richmond), then went on to the Baptist Union Theological Seminary in Chicago.

He served under Confederate General Robert E. Lee with the Army of Northern Virginia during the American Civil War.

Roberts became a missionary supported by the American Baptist Missionary Union, working among the Kachin people around Bhamo and Myitkyina from 1879 until 1913.

On his arrival in Burma, Roberts obtained grudging permission from the Burmese king, Thibaw Min, to build a school and educate the Kachins. The king, a devout Buddhist, granted Roberts "land the size of a buffalo skin". Roberts bought a buffalo skin, cut it into thin strips and used it to measure out the mission compound.

Although his wife soon died from malaria, Roberts was to carry out his mission for 34 years. His daughter, Dora, and his son-in-law, John E. Cummings, also became missionaries to Burma.

In 1881 Roberts remarried and established a school in Bhamo with his second wife, Alice Roberts (d. 1933). They had a son, William Henry Roberts, Jr.

In 1917, the Roberts retired from missionary work and returned to Newton, Massachusetts, where Roberts died in 1919.

== Legacy ==
Roberts was followed by the Swedish-American missionary Ola Hanson, who arrived in 1890 and did much work in compiling a grammar and dictionary for their Jinghpaw language, and in translating hymns and the Bible into Jingpaw. In 1892 George J. Geis arrived, establishing a mission at Myitkyina, to the North of Bhamo.

A school in Bhamo was named after Alice Roberts.
