= Jeanne Larsen =

American poet (born 1950)

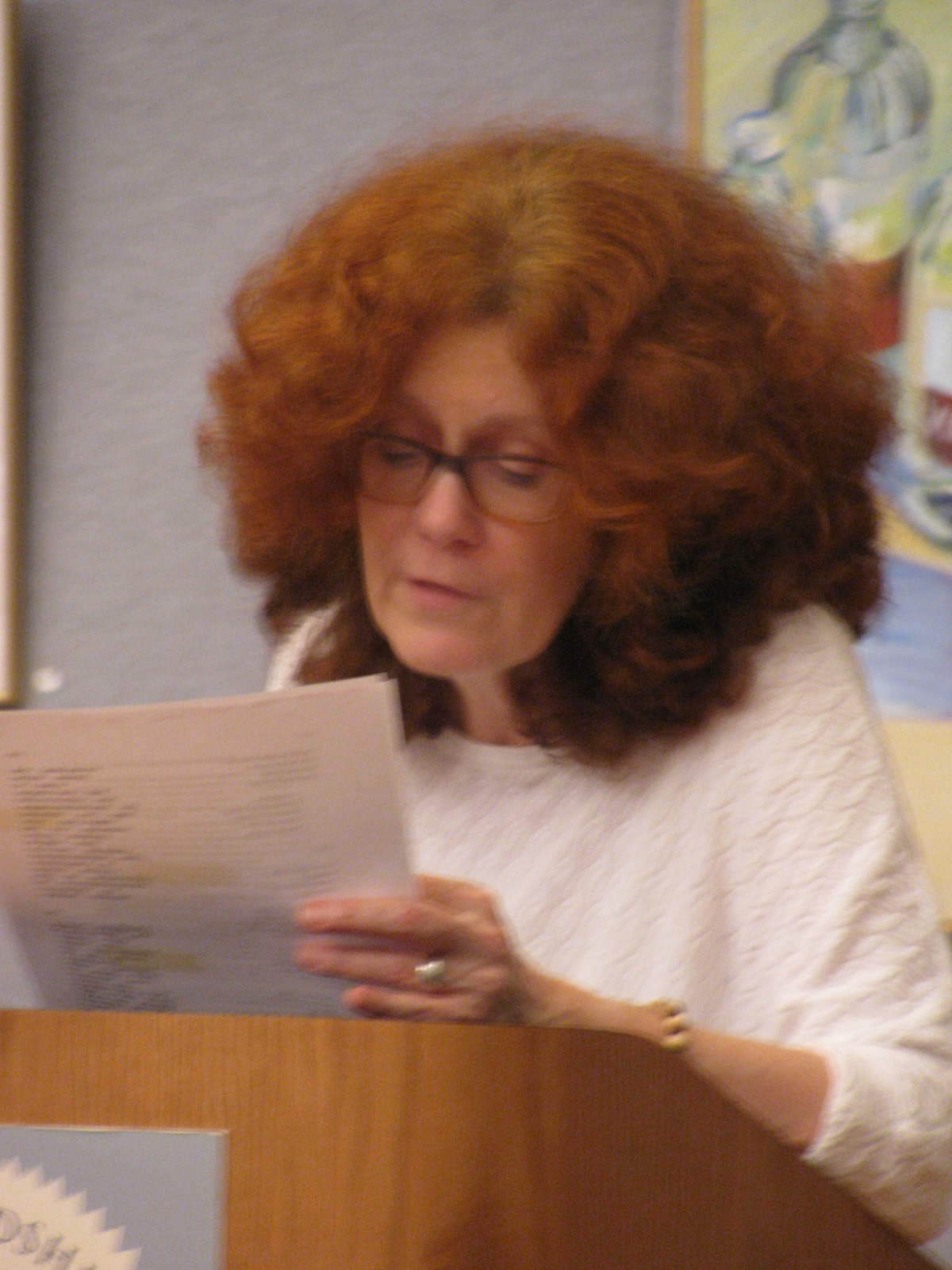
- Larsen in 2013
- Born: 1950 (age 75–76); Washington, D.C., U.S.
- Education: Oberlin College; Hollins College (MA); University of Iowa (PhD)
- Occupations: Poet; novelist; translator; essayist
- Writing career
- Subjects: Buddhist epistemology, narrative and meta-narrative, gender and gender identity, inter-cultural literature
- Notable works: Silk Road, Bronze Mirror, Manchu Palaces, What Penelope Chooses
- Notable awards: Japan/U.S. Friendship Commission Creative Artists Exchange Fellowship; William L. Crawford Award
- Website: official website

Jeanne Larsen (born 1950) is an American poet, novelist, translator, and essayist. Much of her work shows the growing influence of Buddhist perspectives on U.S. literature. This includes not only the poetry and creative nonfiction, but also the novels in her Avalokiteśvara trilogy: Silk Road, Bronze Mirror, and Manchu Palaces.

== Biography ==
Born 1950, in Washington, D.C., Larsen grew up on U.S. Army posts in Kansas, Virginia, Pennsylvania and Germany. A graduate of Oberlin College, she received her M.A. from Hollins College and her Ph.D. in Comparative Literature from the University of Iowa. She has also lived, worked, and studied in Taiwan and Japan. In 1980, she moved to the Roanoke Valley of Virginia in the United States, where she taught literature and creative writing at Hollins University until 2019.

== Published works ==
- What Penelope Chooses: Poems (poetry). Cider Press Review, 2019.
- Why We Make Gardens (& Other Poems) (poetry). Mayapple Press, 2010.
- Sally Paradiso (novel). Brown Fedora Books, 2009.
- Willow, Wine, Mirror, Moon: Women’s Poems from Tang China (literary translations). BOA Editions, Ltd., 2005.
- These Gardens (art book; poems by Jeanne Larsen, drawings by Jan Knipe) privately printed limited edition, 2003.
- Manchu Palaces (novel). Henry Holt & Co., October 1996; abridged audiotape version: Audio Literature, 1997; reprint Authors Guild/iUniverse 2009.
- Bronze Mirror (novel). Henry Holt & Co 1991;, Book of the Month Club 1991; Fawcett (paperback) 1992; Mondadori (Italy) 1992; Centrum (Denmark) 1992; reprint Authors Guild/iUniverse 2009. [Bronze Mirror, an opera based on this book, libretto & score by Milton Granger, was premiered by the Georgia State University School of Music, April 19 & 20, 2002]
- Silk Road (novel). Henry Holt & Co. 1989; Heinemann (U.K.) 1989; Book of the Month Club 1989; Fawcett (U.S. paperback) 1990; Mandarin (U.K. paperback) 1991; Centrum (Denmark) 1990; Rizzoli (Italy) 1990; Heyne (Germany) 1991; Divisione Euroclub Italia (Italy) 1991; reprint Authors Guild/iUniverse 2009.
- Engendering the Word: Feminist Essays in Psychosexual Poetics (literary criticism). Temma F. Berg, ed.; co-editors, Anna Shannon Elfenbein, Jeanne Larsen, Elisa Kay Sparks. University of Illinois Press, 1989
- Brocade River Poems: Selected Works of the Tang Dynasty Courtesan Xue Tao (literary translations) Princeton University Press, 1987.
- James Cook in Search of Terra Incognita: A Book of Poems. University Press of Virginia (Associated Writing Programs Poetry Series), 1979.

== Awards ==
Larsen is the recipient of a Japan/U.S. Friendship Commission Creative Artists Exchange Fellowship (creative nonfiction), an Individual Artist Fellowship (fiction) from the Virginia Commission for the Arts, a National Endowment for the Arts Fellowship (literary translation), the William L. Crawford Award for the year's best new novelist from the International Association for the Fantastic in the Arts and student prizes from the Academy of American Poets.

She has also received residency fellowships from the Millay Colony for the Arts, the Byrdcliffe Artists Colony, The Hambidge Center for Creative Arts & Sciences, Ragdale, the Virginia Center for the Creative Arts, the Eastern Frontier Society, and the Bread Loaf Writers’ Conference. The School for Criticism and Theory and the American Council of Learned Societies/Mellon Foundation have awarded her academic fellowships, and she first went to Taiwan on an Oberlin Shansi teaching-study fellowship.
