= Ethel Morgan Smith =

- Born: April 11, 1952 (age 73); Louisville, Alabama, U.S.
- Education: Hollins University
- Occupations: associate professor, author,
- Known for: From Whence Cometh My Help: The African American Community at Hollins College
- Website: Ethel Morgan Smith

Ethel Morgan Smith born April 11, 1952 Louisville, Alabama is an American author and associate professor. She first received recognition when her essay Come and Be Black for Me was published in 1997. Ethel Morgan Smith is not a radical; she tries to mediate between black and white as in her contribution to the article in The New York Times shows: Robert Byrd, Living History. Her essay in The New York Times entitled Mother documents her hard life being a young black girl, and the circumstances she was born into. Her book Reflections of the Other: Being Black in Germany was a finalist in the Next Generation Indie Book Awards 2014. Smith is a member of The Wintergreen Women Writers Collective.

== Works ==
- From Whence Cometh My Help: The African American Community at Hollins College (1999)
- Reflections of the Other: Being Black in Germany (2012)
- Path to Grace: Reimagining the Civil Rights Movement (2023)
