= Hollins University =

Private women's university in Hollins, Virginia, US

Coordinates: 37°21′17.8″N 79°56′30.4″W

- Former name: List: Valley Union Seminary (1842–1852); Roanoke Female Seminary (1852–1855); Hollins Institute (1855–1911); Hollins College (1911–1998)
- Motto: Latin: Levavi Oculos
- Motto in English: Lift thine eyes
- Type: Private liberal arts university
- Established: 1842; 184 years ago
- Endowment: $327.1 million (2025)
- President: Mary Dana Hinton
- Students: 783
- Undergraduates: 676
- Postgraduates: 107
- Location: Roanoke, Virginia, US
- Colors: Green and gold
- Mascot: None
- Website: hollins.edu
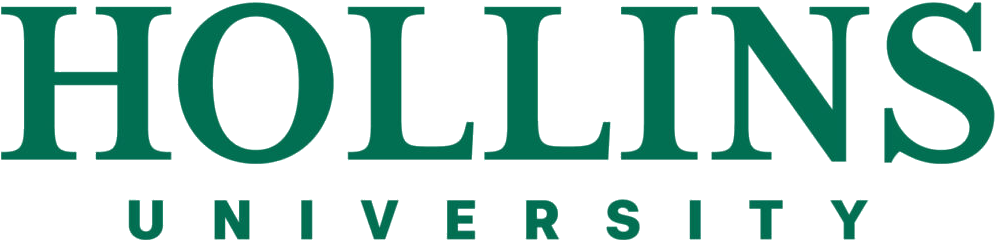
- Hollins College Quadrangle
- U.S. National Register of Historic Places
- Virginia Landmarks Register
- Location within Virginia Location within the United States
- Location: Hollins College Campus, Hollins, Virginia
- Area: 6 acres (2.4 ha)
- Built: 1856
- Architect: Multiple
- Architectural style: Classical Revival, Greek Revival, Romanesque
- NRHP reference No.: 74002145
- VLR No.: 080-0055

Significant dates
- Added to NRHP: November 5, 1974
- Designated VLR: May 21, 1974

Hollins University is a private liberal arts university in Hollins, Virginia, United States. Founded in 1842 as Valley Union Seminary in the historical settlement of Botetourt Springs, it is one of the oldest institutions of higher education for women in the US.

Hollins enrolls about 800 undergraduate and graduate students. As Virginia's first chartered women's college, undergraduate programs are female-only. Men are admitted to the graduate-level programs.

== History ==
The area where Hollins College developed was the site of Botetourt Springs. The area developed as a resort which operated from 1820 to 1841. It then became the site of a short-lived seminary, whose property and buildings were acquired by Valley Union Seminary.

=== 1842–1855: Valley Union Seminary and Charles Lewis Cocke ===
A view of the Cocke Building on the front quad from East.

The institution of higher learning that would become Hollins was first established in 1842 by the Reverend Joshua Bradley, a Baptist minister, as the coeducational Valley Union Seminary. Bradley left in 1845 for Missouri, and in 1846, the seminary's trustees hired a 25-year-old math instructor from Richmond named Charles Lewis Cocke to direct the institution. The same year, Cocke established the first school for enslaved people in the Roanoke area; many students at the school worked at the seminary. In 1851, Cocke abolished the men's department of the institution, and in 1852, the school became a women's college called the Roanoke Female Seminary. In 1855, Lynchburg residents John and Ann Halsey Hollins gave $5,000, and the school was renamed Hollins Institute. The Hollinses gave an additional $12,500 in gifts before their deaths in 1859 and 1864 respectively.

=== Slaves and servants ===
Before the Civil War, Hollins used the labor of enslaved people to build and maintain the grounds. In addition, many students brought "servants" with them who were likely slaves. After slavery was abolished, Hollins employed many formerly enslaved people, mostly women whose names were not recorded. Students were encouraged to ignore these workers in the college handbook during this era, and employees were forbidden from developing friendly relationships with women studying at Hollins.

=== 1855–1870s: Family institution ===
As the head of Hollins, Cocke saw his students as a part of a family and himself as their father figure. His pedagogy was based upon the "southern sensibility that a lady was to be trained to submit to the order of men". Though he thought women studying at Hollins were best confined to domestic duties, he still placed great value on intellectual excellence. Cocke considered the higher education of young women in the South to be his life's calling; in 1857, he wrote that "young women require the same thorough and rigid mental training as that afforded to young men". Hollins was known as a rigorous institution where degrees were not easily earned during Cocke's tenure. Students at the school during this period remember the "unbelieveably [sic] serious" instruction and "high standards". During this period, Hollins also pioneered several academic practices; it became the first school in the United States to begin a system of elective study, and it was the first to establish an English department under a full professor.

=== 1880s–1901 ===
The Hollins of Cocke's ambitions was limited by region, as Cocke was interested in educating women only from Southern states. Because of this limited scope, Hollins struggled to "professionalize" in the 1880s and beyond. Its remote location far from the better respected and funded men's institutions put Hollins in contrast with the Seven Sisters in the Northeast. Despite its academic rigor, Hollins and other southern women's colleges were smaller and poorer than women's college such as Smith College and Mount Holyoke in the north. However, Hollins saw its enrollment rise in the last two decades of the 19th century.

From 1846 until his death, Cocke did not take a stipulated salary from the institution so that the trustees could instead put the school's income toward paying faculty and improving the grounds. In 1900, the board of trustees found themselves so thoroughly in debt to Cocke that the school was deeded to him and his family.

=== 1901–1932: Matty Cocke and accreditation ===
Charles Lewis Cocke's death in 1901 at the age of eighty-one was a grave moment for the Hollins Institute, but the transition to the leadership of his forty-five-year-old daughter Matty Cocke was smooth. "Miss Matty," as she preferred to be called, was intent on preserving the "genteel" atmosphere her father had cultivated at Hollins. Though she was a "charismatic leader" and the first woman to head a college in Virginia, Miss Cocke was not interested in waging any battles for women's education; indeed, she let her nephews, Joseph Turner and M. Estes Cocke, handle the school's financial dealings entirely. Miss Cocke shared the opinion of President John McBryde of Sweet Briar Women's College, who in 1907 decried the "independence" sought by Vassar and other members of the Seven Sisters and suggested instead that women's education focus on "grace [and] refinement". In 1911, the school was renamed Hollins College.

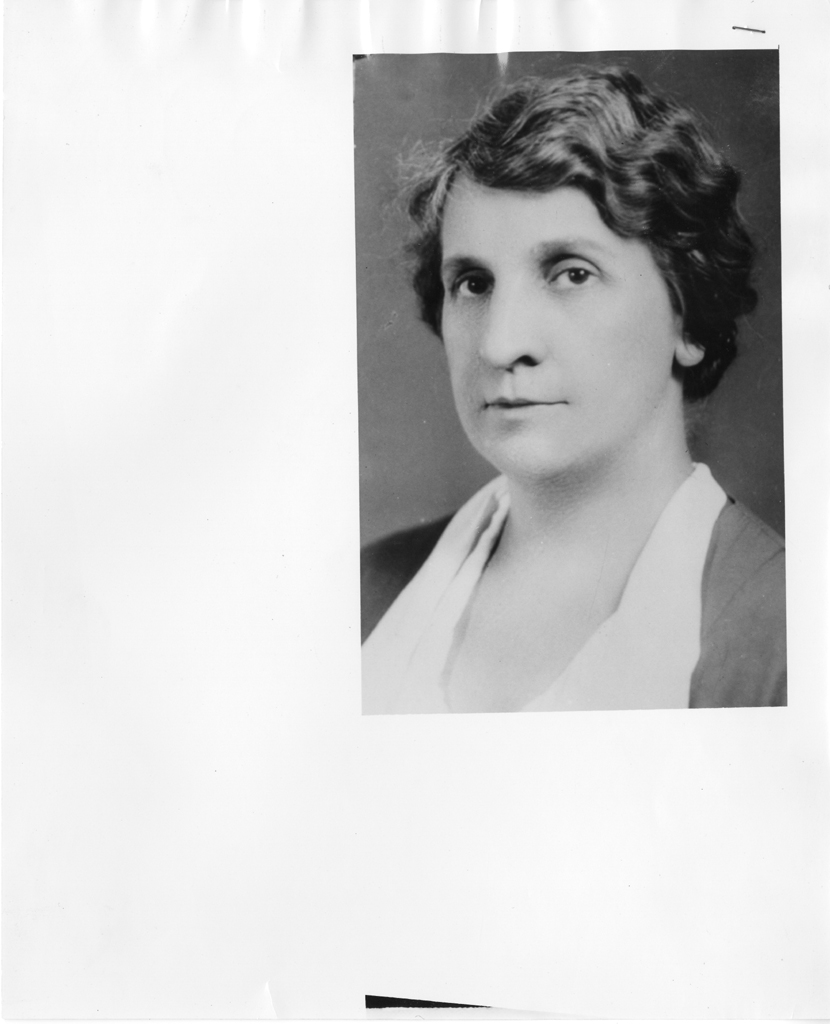
Prof. Harriett Huldah Fillinger, Chair of the Chemistry Dept. 1921-1956

Because the Cocke family owned Hollins, the school could not raise an endowment through alumnae donations. Further stalling Hollins' prosperity was President Matty Cocke's distaste for fundraising. Due to their financial limitations, Hollins was not able to hire high-quality faculty or assemble an up-to-date library or laboratory, making accreditation hard to achieve. This was not unusual for the time; as of 1916, only seven southern women's college were certified by professional organizations as "standard," while both Hollins and Sweet Briar were designated as "approximate". The Cocke family agreed to turn over ownership if sufficient funds were raised in 1925, but the Depression slowed their efforts. A scathing 1930 letter from alumna Eudora Ramsay Richardson in the South Atlantic Quarterly indicted the American Association of University Women for regional bias. Richardson's letter and prompting from the presidents of Mount Holyoke and Bryn Mawr sped up the accreditation process. The Cocke family turned the school over to a board of trustees and President Cocke tendered her resignation in 1932, as the school finally gained accreditation.

=== 1933–present ===
Hollins was home to the first exhibition gallery in the Roanoke region in 1948. In 1950 when he was 31 years of age John R. Everett was elected President of Hollins College, a position he held until he resigned in 1960. One of the first writer-in-residence programs in America began at Hollins in 1959. Hollins was home to the first graduate program focusing on the writing and study of children's literature, established in 1993. Hollins University Quadrangle is on the National Register of Historic Places.The institution was renamed Hollins College in 1911, and in 1998 it became Hollins University. Nancy Oliver Gray led Hollins from 2005 until she retired in 2017; that same year, Pareena Gupta Lawrence, an economist and an Asian-American immigrant, became Hollins's twelfth president.

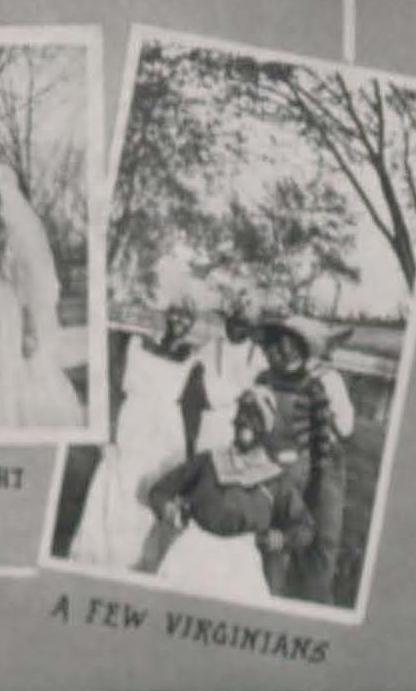
Photograph of Hollins University students wearing blackface in one of the Hollins yearbooks briefly removed from the Hollins digital commons

In April 2019, the president directed the temporary removal of four volumes of the university yearbook from the library's digital commons after the 2019 blackface controversy involving Virginia Governor Ralph Northam. The four volumes (1915, 1950, 1969, 1985) contained photographs of students wearing blackface. The university issued a statement saying access to the digitized yearbooks would be restored as soon as the university developed accompanying "educational information regarding the history and practice of blackface to help all of us understand why it is a racist and prejudicial practice." The removal was criticized by the Society of American Archivists, the American Library Association's Office of Intellectual Freedom, and the Virginia Library Association. The digitized volumes were still available on the Internet Archive, and all physical copies of the yearbooks were also available in the library. The Wyndham Robertson Library and the Working Group on Slavery issued a statement in response objecting to the decision, stating that, "we cannot and do not support any erasure of institutional history, even if only temporarily" and recommended that the affected yearbooks be made electronically accessible again along with a statement on the content. Access to the four digitized volumes was restored on April 9, less than one week after their removal along with the added educational content.

Mary Dana Hinton became the thirteenth president of Hollins University on August 1, 2020. She is the first African American president in the university's history.

== Campus ==
The Hollins College Quadrangle consists of six contributing buildings. The earliest buildings were built for the Botetourt Springs resort which operated from 1820 to 1841. When it failed, the property and buildings were acquired for Valley Union Seminary.

The first built specifically for the new college is East Building, erected 1856–58 opposite the hotel building. The Main building was built in 1861 at the north end of the quadrangle, Bradley Chapel was erected in 1883 between the East and Main Buildings, the octagonal Botetourt Hall was built in 1890, and the Charles Cocke Memorial Library was built in 1908 at the south end of the quadrangle.

The main dorm of Hollins University was decorated and improved in the 19th century by local carpenter and woodworker Gustave A. Sedon.

Hollins College Quadrangle was added to the National Register of Historic Places in 1974. Founded in 2004, the Eleanor D. Wilson Museum, an art museum, is housed at the university.

== Housing ==
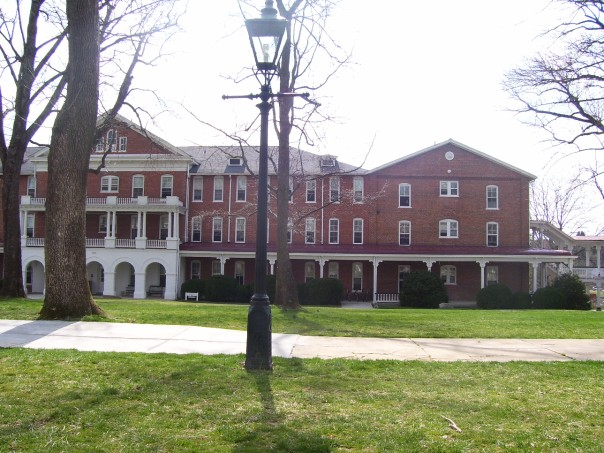
A view of West from the front quadrangle.

There are nine residence halls on campus. Most first-years live in Tinker and Randolph in doubles. Sophomores and juniors generally live in West or in singles in Tinker and Randolph, and primarily seniors (with a few exceptions) live in Main, or the university apartments on campus. Housing choices are determined by a lottery number given after the housing deposit is paid in the spring; the lottery numbers are assigned randomly from within a preset range determined by class year.

All undergraduates are required to live on campus. The exceptions to this rule are Horizon (nontraditional) students, married students or those with children, those over the age of 23, or those whose official residence with parents or guardians is in the Roanoke Valley area.

== Traditions and folklore ==
Hollins University has a number of beloved traditions, many of which have been observed for more than 100 years. Tinker Day is one of them, dating back to the 1880s. One day in October, after the first frost, classes are cancelled so that students, faculty, and staff can climb nearby Tinker Mountain while wearing colorful and silly costumes. After a lunch of fried chicken and Tinker Cake, the students and new faculty perform skits and sing songs before returning to campus. The exact date of the celebration is a closely held secret.

== Academics ==
Hollins offers small classes with a 9:1 student-teacher ratio in a variety of majors. The most popular majors are English, psychology, studio art, business, and biology. Currently Hollins offers graduate programs in dance (M.F.A.), creative writing (M.F.A.), children's literature (M.A., M.F.A.), liberal studies (M.A.L.S.), playwriting (M.F.A.), screenwriting and film studies (M.A., M.F.A.), and teaching (M.A.T.). As of 2011, Hollins offers a graduate-level certificate in Children's Book Illustration.

Hollins was one of the first colleges in the nation to establish a study abroad program, launching Hollins Abroad-Paris in 1955. Approximately half of Hollins students have an international learning experience. Hollins runs its own programs in London and Paris; non-Hollins students are free to apply to the Hollins Abroad-London and-Paris programs. Hollins students can also study through Hollins-sponsored programs in Argentina, Germany, Ghana, Ireland, Italy, Greece, Japan, Mexico, Spain, South Africa, and in various other countries through the School for Field Studies. Hollins also sponsors an annual service-learning project in Lucea, Jamaica.

=== Curriculum ===
A liberal arts school, Hollins has designed its own Education through Skills and Perspectives (ESP) general education requirement program. Rather than focusing on the usual math, science, English, and history booklist of required courses, Hollins requires each student to take a variety of skills classes (writing, oral communication, applied quantitative reasoning, and applied research techniques) and perspectives classes (aesthetic analysis, creative expression, ancient and/or medieval worlds, modern and/or contemporary worlds, social and cultural diversities, scientific inquiry, and global systems and languages). These requirements can be completed in as few as 8 courses but aim to help the students explore other fields of study while rounding out their basic understanding of the world.

Hollins offers majors in the fields of studio art, art history, biology, business, chemistry, classical studies, communication studies, dance, economics, English, environmental studies, film, French, gender and women's studies, history, interdisciplinary studies, international studies, mathematics, music, philosophy, political science, psychology, public health, religious studies, sociology, Spanish, and theatre.

Other academic offerings include: arts management certificate, the Batten certificate in leadership studies, Hollins Outdoor Leadership certificate, education, first-year seminars, three-year accelerated degree program, pre-law, pre-med, pre-nursing, pre-vet, short term, and Horizon program for adult women.

=== Writing program ===
The graduate program in creative writing was founded by Louis D. Rubin, Jr., in 1960, but Hollins has offered classes in creative writing for even longer. In 2008 the Jackson Center for Creative Writing was established through a private donation from Susan Gager Jackson 1968 and her husband, John Jackson, of Far Hills, New Jersey.

The Jackson Center for Creative Writing is home to Hollins' undergraduate and graduate writing programs, which have produced dozens of writers of national and international acclaim, including Lee Smith 1967 and Pulitzer Prize winners Annie Dillard 1967, M.A. 1968; Henry S. Taylor M.A. 1966; and Natasha Trethewey M.A. 1991. Kiran Desai M.A. 1994 won both the Man Booker Prize for Fiction and the National Book Critics Circle Award. The fiction of Madison Smartt Bell M.A. 1981 has been recognized by a Strauss Living Award, and numerous other Hollins writers have received NEA, Guggenheim, and countless other grants and awards for their poetry, fiction, and nonfiction.

The campus has three literary magazines. Cargoes, which won the Undergraduate Literary Prize for content by the Association of Writers and Writing Programs in 2005, The Album, which is offered as a more alternative campus periodical, and Gravel, which focuses on student work centered around multicultural and diverse identities. R. H. W. Dillard, Cathryn Hankla, and Jeanne Larsen are among the writers who teach at Hollins.

== Athletics ==
Hollins athletics logo

Hollins University athletics is a member of the Division III level of the National Collegiate Athletic Association (NCAA), primarily competing throughout Virginia in the Old Dominion Athletic Conference (ODAC) since the 1981–82 academic year.

Hollins competes in eight intercollegiate varsity sports: basketball, cross country, riding, soccer, swimming, tennis, track & field (indoor and outdoor) and volleyball. In the past Hollins has had programs in golf, fencing, and field hockey. The last year that the university had a golf program was in the 2017–18 academic year. The school also had a lacrosse program, but it was discontinued in 2023.

Hollins does not have a mascot, and the sports teams do not have an official nickname. In 1989, students voted against 100 mascot ideas.

As part of its Education through Skills and Perspectives (ESP) general education requirement program, two regular terms of physical education course work are required for graduation.

== Student body ==
In October 2019, Hollins released a new policy regarding applicants and students who may identify as transgender. The new policy states "Hollins accepts applications from individuals who consistently live and identify as women." Students who begin to transition from female to male while at Hollins are still eligible to earn their degree.

=== Clubs and organizations ===
Hollins has a number of organizations that are open to all students.

The university has a chapter of Phi Beta Kappa.

Freya walks take place on nights of special events or issues. Members of this secret society walk at night to call attention to or celebrate current events. They wear black-hooded robes to protect their anonymity and carry candles to symbolize hope. Since 1903, Freya has sought to emphasize the notion that "concern for the community is a creative and active force".

ADA is a secret society that promotes school spirit, having fun, and fostering community at Hollins University. Since 1907, ADA has been known to don the color purple every Tuesday. Alongside that, ADA yells out announcements of weekly events, sports games, and birthdays every Tuesday afternoon. They hold a blood drive every semester as well. Though ADA does not hide their identities, their mission is kept a secret.

== Notable alumni ==
- Jennifer Berman, sexual health expert, urologist, and female sexual medicine specialist
- Jenny Boully, poetry and essayist
- Margaret Wise Brown, author of Goodnight Moon, 1932
- Ann Compton, ABC Radio White House correspondent, National Radio Hall of Fame
- Kiran Desai, author and recipient of the Man Booker Prize in 2006, M.A. 1994
- Annie Dillard, Pulitzer Prize–winning writer, 1967, M.A. 1968
- Ellen Malcolm, founder of EMILY's List, B.A. 1969
- Katy Pyle, artistic director of Ballez, B.A. 2002
- Henry S. Taylor, Pulitzer Prize–winning poet, M.A. 1966
- Lisa Emery, American stage, film, and television actress, B.A. (Theatre Arts) 1974
- Beth Macy, reporter and author of Dopesick, M.A. 1993
- Sally Mann, American photographer, M.A. (Writing) 1975
