= Ballez =

American ballet company

General information
- Name: Ballez
- Year founded: 2011
- Principal venue: Brooklyn Arts Exchange; Brooklyn, New York City; New York, U.S.
- Website: Ballez

Artistic staff
- Artistic Director: Katy Pyle

Ballez is an American ballet company based in New York City. The company re-stages classical works and produces original ballets to emphasize LGBTQ representation in ballet.

== History ==
Ballez was founded in 2011 by Katy Pyle, a lesbian and genderqueer dancer, with a focus on creating possibilities, representation, and inclusion for queer dancers within the patriarchal structure of ballet. The creation of Ballez was funded by a grant from the Brooklyn Arts Exchange and was originally an outreach program to provide ballet classes to LGBTQ people that felt disenfranchised in traditional classical dance settings. The company aims to portray and include lesbian, gay, transgender, and queer people in ballet through their performances, public engagement programs, and classes that are open to the public.

Original takes on classical and story ballets that the company has performed include The Firebird, a Ballez, featuring a lesbian princess and a transgender prince, at Dancespace Project in 2013, Variations on Virtuosity, a Gala with the Stars of the Ballez at American Realness at Abrons Arts Center in 2015, and Sleeping Beauty & the Beast, based on historic events in queer history from the 1982 garment workers' strike to the AIDS epidemic in the 1980s and 1990s, at La Mama in 2016. Other original works by the company include Slavic Goddess, which was a collaboration with Paulina Olowska in 2017, and a pas de deux for Kyong H. Park's PILLOWTALK in 2018. In 2021 the Joyce Theatre presented Giselle of Loneliness, inspired by the ballet Giselle and the novel The Well of Loneliness.

Ballez hosts open adult ballet classes and offers free YouTube videos of ballet class for people who are not able to take class in New York.
