= Sparklmami =

American musician

- Born: Ariella Granados Texas, U.S.
- Origin: Chicago, Illinois, U.S.
- Genres: Brazilian Jazz, Alternative, Soul, Bolero, Avant-garde, Funk
- Occupations: Singer, Songwriter, Makeup artist
- Years active: 2024-present
- Label: Verve

Ariella Granados known professionally as Sparklmami, is an American singer, songwriter, and record producer.

She (Note: Granados uses she/her and they/them pronouns. This article uses she/her for consistency.) is best known her avant-garde style blending Brazilian jazz, soul, Bolero, and Funk. She is also known for incorporating both Spanish and English in her music. She released her debut album, in this body, on June 5, 2026.

== Early life ==
Ariella Granados was born in Bryan, Texas, U.S. to an Indian father and a Mexican mother. Granados describes her relationship with her father as estranged, and met him again in 2023. She wrote her song "fajas" about this relationship. Granados grew up Christian. Granados has since moved to Chicago.

== Discography ==
=== Extended plays ===
- in this body

=== Singles ===
- "fajas" (2024)
- "running" (2024)
- "summer school radio with Lovie" (2025)
- "TOUCH" (2025)
- "KRINK" (2025)
- "running (remix/live)" (2026)
- "no te vayas" (2026)
- "si" (2026)
