= Silver Terrace, San Francisco =

Silver Terrace
- Neighborhood of San Francisco
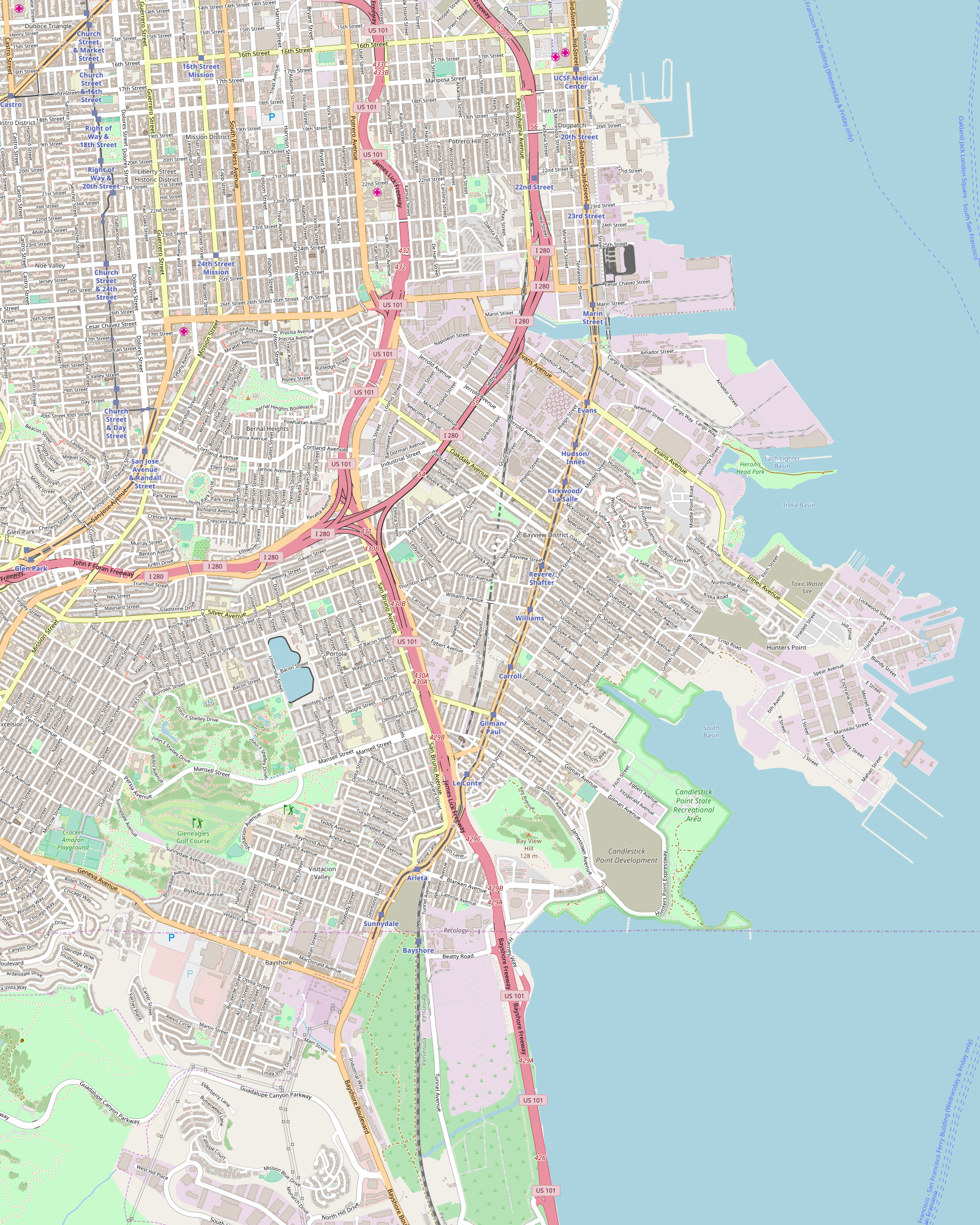
- Location within San Francisco Silver Terrace (San Francisco County) Silver Terrace (San Francisco Bay Area)
- Coordinates: 37.7332°N 122.3986°W

Government
  - Supervisor: Shamann Walton
  - CA Assembly: Matt Haney (D)
  - State Senator: Scott Wiener (D)
  - U.S. Rep.: Nancy Pelosi (D)

Area
  - Total: 1.00 km^{2} (0.385 sq mi)

Population (2016)
  - Total: 7,328
  - Density: 7,350/km^{2} (19,000/sq mi)
- Time zone: UTC-8 (PST)
  - Summer (DST): UTC-7 (PDT)
- ZIP Code: 94124
- Area codes: 415/628

Silver Terrace is a neighborhood in the south eastern corner of San Francisco, between Bayview–Hunters Point and Portola neighborhoods. It is roughly bordered by Third Street to the east, Palou Avenue and Silver Avenue to the north, Williams Avenue to the south and Bayshore Boulevard and U.S. Route 101 to the west. A tunnel used by Caltrain runs under Silver Terrace.
