= Ray F. and Ethel Smith House =

Historic house in Utah, United States

- U.S. National Register of Historic Places
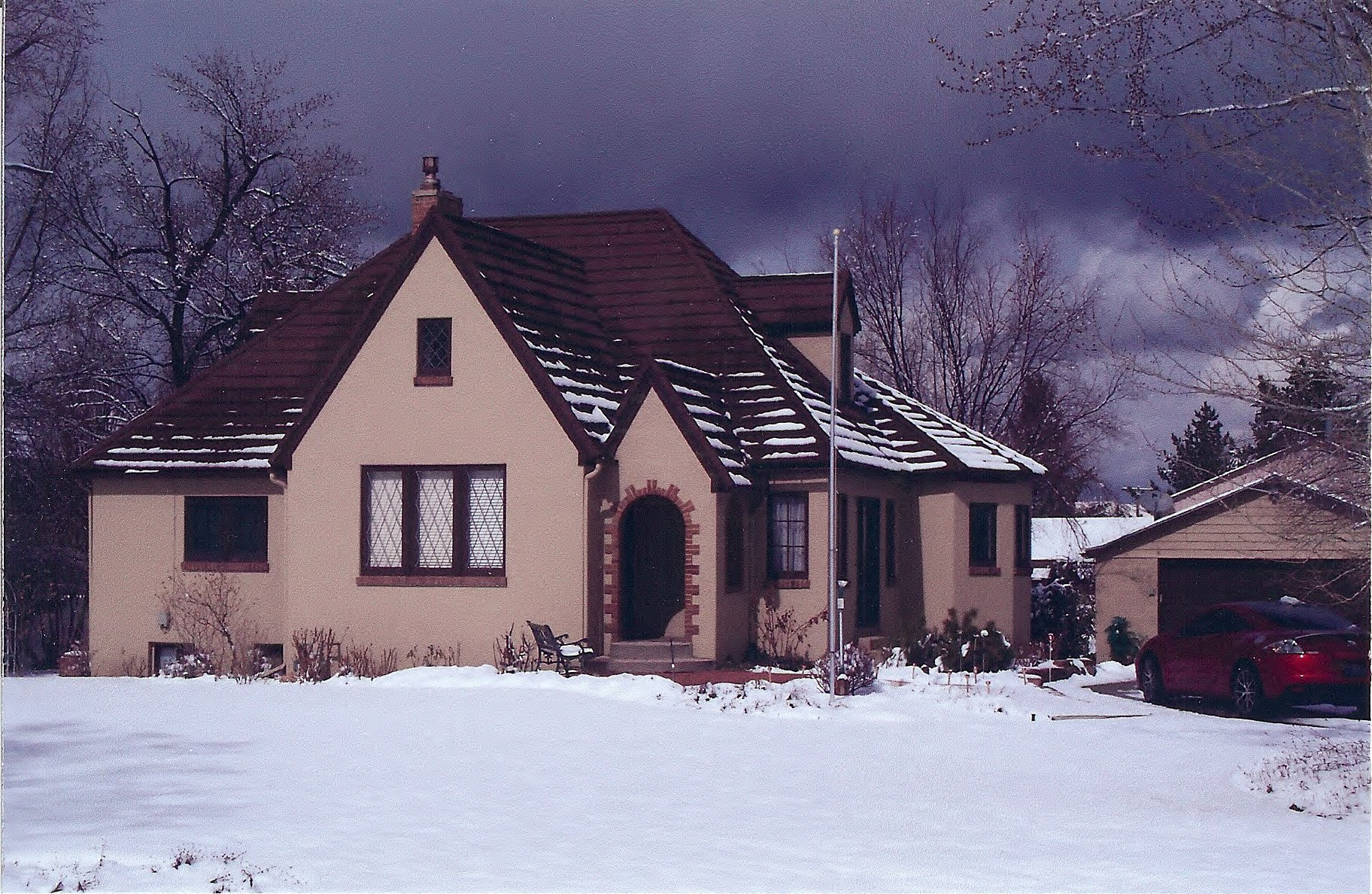

- Location within Utah Location within the United States
- Location: 1697 E. Vine St., Murray, Utah
- Coordinates: 40°38′29″N 111°50′34″W
- Area: .66 acres (0.27 ha)
- Built: 1937
- MPS: Historic Resources of Murray City, Utah, 1859–1967
- NRHP reference No.: 100004479
- Added to NRHP: September 30, 2019

The Ray F. and Ethel Smith House, at 1697 E. Vine St. in Murray, Utah, was listed on the National Register of Historic Places in 2019.

It is a one-and-a-half-story "English Tudor period revival cottage" built in 1937, associated with early farming families in the area.

It is a stucco-covered wood-frame building with brick details, upon a concrete foundation.

A second contributing building on the property is a historic garage built 1955; there is also a non-contributing later garage.
