= Paulina Olowska =

Polish artist (born 1976)

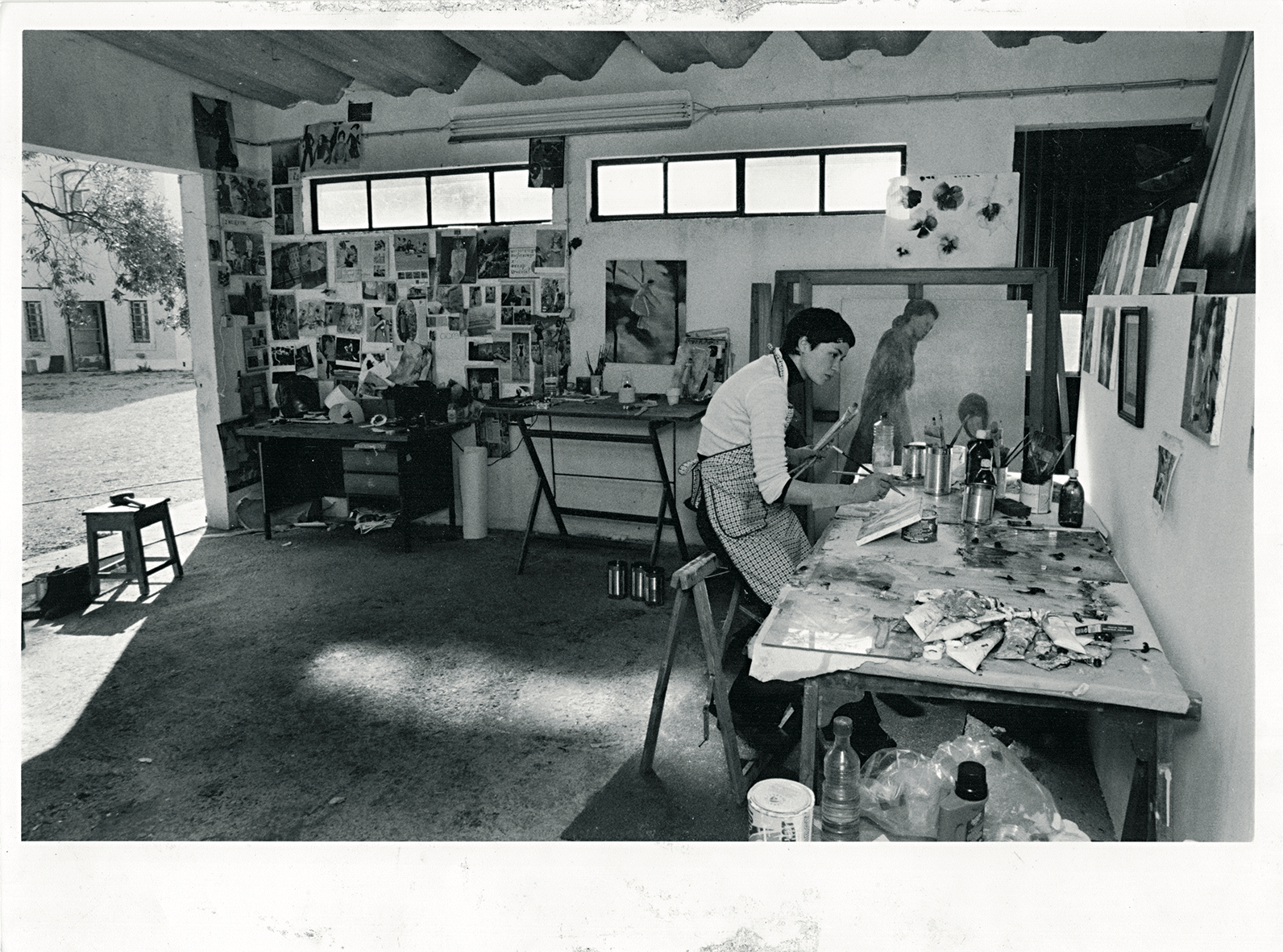
- Paulina Olowska in studio
- Born: 1976 (age 49–50); Gdańsk, Poland
- Known for: Painting, Collage, Sculpture, Neon, performance art
- Notable work: Cafe Bar (2011), Accidental Collages (2004)

Paulina Olowska (born 1976, Gdańsk) is a Polish painter and photographer, who also works in the field of performance and video-art, social action and applied art. The areas of her artistic explorations are modernist utopias and research on the work of 20th century artists, which she combines with her own creative practice to bring unjustly forgotten ideas back to life. A characteristic thread in Olowska's work is her interest in female attitudes in art and her search for "protoplasts"; such as Alina Szapocznikow and Zofia Stryjeńska. The artist lives and works in Rabka-Zdrój.

== Education ==
In 1995-1996 Olowska studied at the School of the Art Institute of Chicago (SAIC).

Between 1997 and 2000 she studied painting and printmaking at the Faculty of Painting of the Academy of Fine Arts in Gdansk.

She received scholarships from the Royal Academy of Fine Arts in the Hague (1988), Centro de Art Communication Visual (Arco) in Lisbon (1998/1999), Center of Contemporary Art in Kitakyushu (1999/2000) and Rijksakademie van Beeldende Kunsten in Amsterdam (2001/2002).

== Oeuvre ==
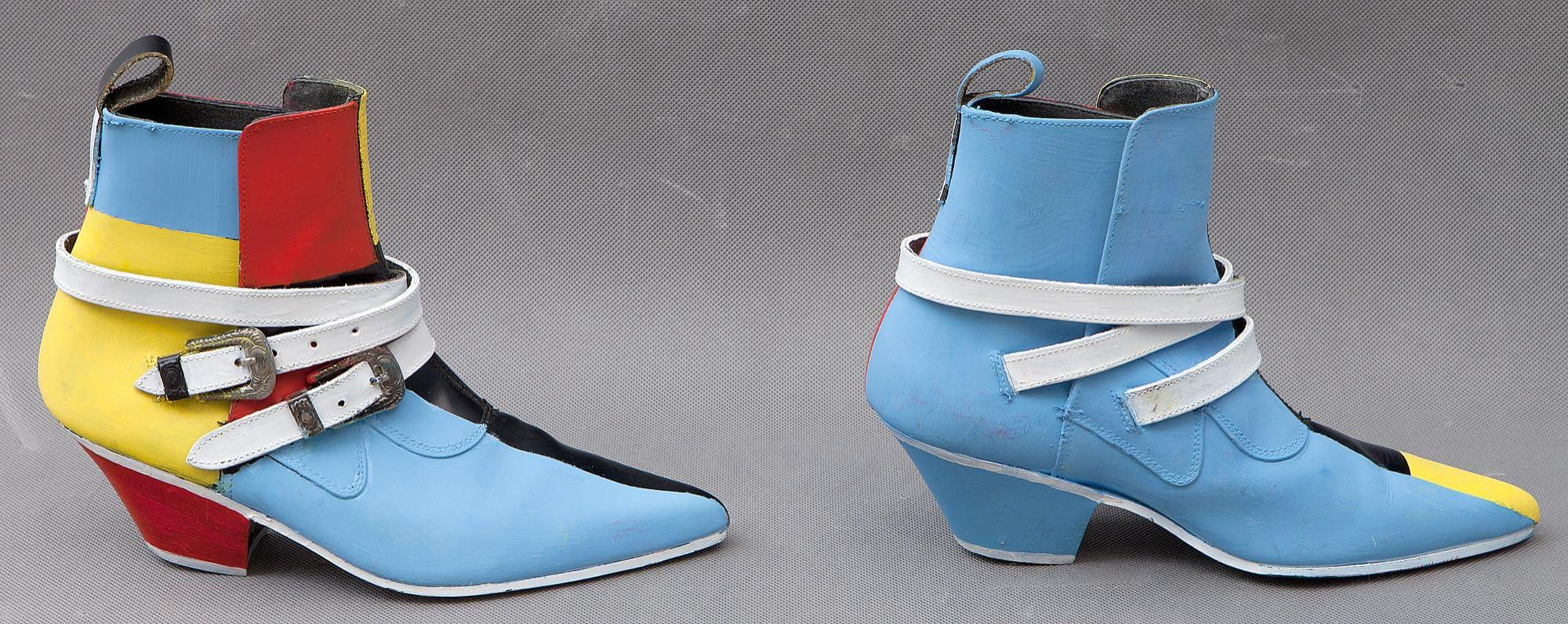
Paulina Ołowska, Constructivist Rockabilly Boots (Buty Konstruktywistyczne typu Rockabilly), 2000

Paulina Olowska's work is characterized by a synthesis of arts. In her works she willingly uses various media, such as painting, collage, installation, performance, fashion and music, which allows her to obtain an exceptionally rich range of artistic impressions. Olowska's work is the product of her current experiences and fascinations. A common feature of her works is the romantic vision of art as a carrier of positive utopias and the belief that "art can change the world". Olowska's main interests include the artistic utopias of modernism found in the foundations of the early Bauhaus (the Bauhaus Yoga project, 2001), the circles of Russian constructivists (Abstraction in Process, 2000) and the explorations of the European avant-garde of the early 20th century.

In May 2003 Olowska together with Lucy McKenzie temporarily ran the underground bar Nova Popularna in Warsaw, which hosted weekly concerts and performances. The artists designed the interior of the bar, including murals, curtains, furniture and sculptures, and served guests with the help of friends and locals. After Nova Popularna closed, the artists began creating works to commemorate and historicize the project. The resulting series of collages incorporate visual materials that inspired the bar, including images of artworks such as Édouard Manet's A Bar at the Folies-Bergère (1882) and Edgar Degas' The Absinthe Drinker (1875–76), as well as model clippings from contemporary fashion magazines and Art Deco interiors from architecture and design publications.

Olowska also does not shy away from performance. Presented at Tate Modern in 2015, The Mother An Unsavoury Play in Two Acts and an Epilogue is an adaptation of avant-garde playwright Stanislaw Ignacy Witkiewicz's 1924 play. The story takes place in a bourgeois setting where hallucinations, schizophrenia, alcoholism, madness and drug addiction escalate into surreal madness.

The artist often returns to the work of Zofia Stryjeńska (1891–1976), exploring the visionary imagery of the Polish artist of the interwar period. In Slavic Goddesses, the artist explores Stryjeńska's notion of ballet as a "wreath of ceremony" by designing costumes based on her 1918 painting series under the same title. The actors, dressed in surreal costumes with huge headdresses adorned with peacock feathers and wheat stalks, portray imaginative characters from Slavic mythology and folklore: goddesses of mischief, fortune, fate, spring, winter, and heaven. The original score by American artist Sergei Tcherepnin combines cosmic sounds with traditional mazurkas, polkas and obereks, as well as "spiritual disco" and the local musical tradition of Val Gardena.

Another key performance in Paulina Olowska oeuvre was the Alphabet, which was inspired by the book ABECEDA by Karel Teige, a key figure in the Czech avant-garde who in 1926, in collaboration with Milca Mayerova, created an experimental "mobile alphabet". Referring to Teige's project, Olowska combines rhythmicity with a constructivist fascination with typography and points to the rhetorical function of dance: three performers arrange their bodies into 26 letters, from A to Z, confronting the alphabet of written language with the "alphabet" of gestures and movements, creating a new system for expressing meaning. Alphabet was first shown in Berlin in 2005 (Galerie Meerrettich). In 2012 it was exhibited at the Museum of Modern Art in New York, and in early 2014 it was presented at the Museum of Modern Art in Warsaw.

In 2004, Olowska began a project to refabricate the neon signs that illuminated Warsaw in the 1960s and 1970s. Many of the neon signs were designed by artists for state-run monopolies and promoted general activities such as hairdressing, sports, and reading books. Olowska organized an exhibition at the Foksal Gallery Foundation, Painting – Exchange – Neon (2006), to raise money for the restoration and reinstallation of the 1961 neon sign Volleyball Player by Jan Mucharski, which originally advertised a sports store on Constitution Square.

Her approach to conservation has developed performatically and over time, as a result of researching and responding to numerous local modernisms - from regional constructivism to magazine designs. In 2010, the artist undertook a social and artistic initiative which involved covering the facade of the Rabcio theater building in a mountainous village near Krakow with large-scale paintings inspired by the designs of stage designer and painter Jerzy Kolecki. By making a kind of collage of works she had found in the theater's archives, she transferred them onto the building, making them visible again in the public space. While on a scholarship in Portugal she painted a series of paintings that referred to fashion photographs from the magazine Ty i Ja / You and Me, a cult magazine for young Polish intellectuals of the 1960s.

The painting entitled Ewa Wawrzoń (2013) in costume from the play Rhinoceros (1961) represents the characteristic motif of forgotten heroines or artists in Paulina Olowska's work. Olowska seeks to excavate their stories and reinterpret them, inserting them into a broader narrative, thus contributing to the tradition of women's art. Olowska holds provincial stage artists in particular in high esteem (e.g., the series devoted to actresses at the Rabcio Puppet Theatre in Rabka) - women who are risky, committed and ambiguous. Their complex condition serves as an inspiration to define the artist's contemporary identity.

Currently the artist runs Kadenówka Creative House in Rabka-Zdrój where she invites artists to collaborate in creative projects.

In addition, Olowska publishes the Pavilionesque magazine, devoted to various aspects of contemporary art and theater. The magazine is also a form of active archive, which seeks and recovers unpublished archival materials related to theater, performance and puppetry.

== Awards and Prizes ==
2014 Aachen Art Prize

2017 Bessie Awards Nomination for Outstanding Visual Design

== Selected solo exhibitions and performances ==
Year	Name of the exhibition/performance	Location
2023	Squelchy Garden Mules and Mamunas	Pace Gallery, London
2023	Visual Persuasion	Fondazione Sandretto Re Rebaudengo, Turin
2023	Resonance	Kurimanzutto, Mexico City
2022	Her Hauntology	Kistefos Museum, Jevnaker
2022	The Revange of the Wise Woman (performance)	Art in Mayfair Program, Hanover Square, London
2022	Naughty Nymphs in the Courtyard of the Favorites (performance)	The Art Institute of Chicago, Chicago
2021	Haus Proud	Metro Pictures Gallery, New York
2021	30 Minutes Before Midnight	Simon Lee Gallery, Hong Kong
2021	Slavic Goddesses (performance)	Foksal Gallery Foundation, Warsaw
2021	Grotesque Alphabet (after Roland Tapor) (performance)	Walker Art Center, Minneapolis
2020	Wages for Housework	Foksal Gallery Foundation, Warsaw
2019	Destroyed Women	Simon Lee Gallery, London
2018	Belavia	Metro Pictures Gallery, New York
2018	Slavic Goddesses and the Ushers (performance)	Novecento Museo, Milan
2018	Amoresques: An Intellectual Cocktail of Female Erotica	Foksal Gallery Foundation, Warsaw
2017	Slavic Goddesses - –A Wreath of Ceremonies (performance)	The Kitchen, New York
2016	Paulina Ołowska. Wisteria, Mysteria, Hysteria	Metro Pictures Gallery, New York
2015	Montana Ensemble	Au 8 rue saint bon, Paris
2015	The Mother An Unsavory Play in two Acts and an Epilogue (performance)	Tate Modern, London

== Works in collections ==
Her paintings and installations can be found in the collections of the Pompidou Centre in Paris, the MoMA in New York and the Tate Modern in London.

== Bibliography ==
- K. Smith-Raabe, J. Rosenfeld, A. Gratza, V. Semenska, J. Vetwoert, A. Pyzik, M. Janion, N. Paszkowski, Z. Lisowska, "Her Hauntology", Jevnaker: Kistefos, 2022.
- A. Janevski, R. Marcoci, K. Nouril, eds. "Art and Theory of Post-1989 Central and Eastern Europe: A Critical Anthology", New York: The Museum of Modern Art: 10–11.
- M. Szewczyk, “Paulina Olowska,” NGV Magazine #9 (March/April), 2018: 34–37.
- K. Kosciuczuk, “Paulina Olowska,” Frieze (April), 2018: 154.
- A. Bujnowska, A. Szymczyk, J. Verwoert, Paulina Ołowska, JRP|Ringier, 2013
- D. Leader, E. Klekot, Paulina Ołowska, Cermics, Simon Lee Gallery, 2016
- C. Bishop, Paulina Ołowska: Reactivating MOdernism, Parkett, No. 92, 2013
- M. Dziewańska, Storytelling - History in Motion, Parkett, No. 92, 2013
- C. Wood, Design for Living Parkett, No. 92, 2013
