= Kyoung H. Park =

Korean-Chilean playwright (born 1982)

Kyoung H. Park (born 1982 in Santiago, Chile) is a Korean-Chilean playwright. He is credited as being the first Korean from Latin America to be produced and published in the United States. Currently, Kyoung H. Park resides in Brooklyn, New York where he serves as the Artistic Director at Kyoung’s Pacific Beat, a peacemaking theater company.

== Education and early career ==
In 2003, Park received his BFA in dramatic writing from the Tisch School of the Arts at New York University. During his tenure at New York University, he studied playwriting for the Lark Play Development Center and served as a member of Ma-Yi Writer’s Lab and Ensemble Studio Theater’s Youngblood. Park has stated that during this time he realized that he wanted to become a playwright, but that his career was halted, as he was deported from the United States for an expired visa.

After being deported, Kyoung H. Park enrolled at Kyung Hee University in South Korea to pursue his a degree in Peace Studies. He received his Masters in Peace Studies in 2007. Park worked in the Korean Art and Culture Education Service where helped marginalized communities gain access to artistic resources

After receiving his master's degree, Park was engaged in political-theater programs where he could combine his interest in theater and peace studies. He was a part of the Royal Court Theatre’s Young Writer’s Programme in London where he wrote disOriented. Kyoung Park also traveled to Rio de Janeiro as an international exchange fellow in Boal’s Theater of the Oppressed. Park took part in community-based theater that presented in favelas and psychiatric wards.

Park returned to the United States where he studied to earn his MFA in playwriting at Columbia University School of the Arts. Here, Park learned how to create his own work and eventually wrote his play Tala for his thesis. Kyoung Park received his degree from Columbia in 2012.

== Later career and productions ==
In 2011 in Brooklyn, New York, Park founded his theater company Kyoung's Pacific Beat, a collaborative theater that tells stories of marginalized and oppressed communities through experimental theater. Since its inception, Kyoung has written three plays for his theater to perform. In 2011, the theater premiered disOriented, a story about a Korean immigrant named Ju Yeon living in New York City. A family emergency forces her to return to Korea, where she struggles to face her family after being estranged from her them for years.

Tala, which Park wrote for his thesis at Columbia, premiered at Kyoung's Pacific Beat in 2015. Tala is a semi-autobiographical story that mixes Park's real life experiences with a story of two homosexual Chilean Poets. The play follows the poets, Pepe and Luis, as they go out on a date of the night before 1973 Chilean coup d'état. Tala also includes a second storyline of a gay Korean-Chilean playwright, who is supposed to represent Kyoung Park.

In 2018, Kyoung's Pacific Beat premiered Pillow Talk. Pillow Talk tackles issues such as intersectionality and gay marriage through dialogue. The story follows an interracial gay couple as they discuss their personal struggles and marital needs. The legalization of same-sex marriage inspired Park to write Pillow Talk. Park never believed that marriage was a possibility in his life and wanted to discuss the struggles that gay couples face.

Kyoung H. Park currently serves as a founding member of the Sol Project, which launched in May 2016. The Sol Project is a national theater initiative that promotes Latinx playwrights to the theater community.

== Plays ==
=== Full length ===
- Sex & Hunger (2004)
- disOriented (2007)
- Walkabout Yeolha (2010)
- Tala (2011)
- Pillowtalk (2013)

=== Short plays ===
- Mina (2004)
- Not Yours/Eyes (2008)
- My Mom in Santiago (2010)
- Fools for Love (2011)
- We're Cheap that Way (2011)
- The Meeting (2012)
- Unqualified (2016)
- El Octavo Dia (2016)
