= National Register of Historic Places listings in Salem, Virginia =

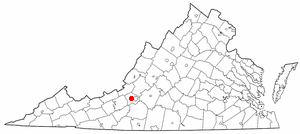
Location of Salem in Virginia

This is a list of the National Register of Historic Places listings in Salem, Virginia.

This is intended to be a complete list of the properties and districts on the National Register of Historic Places in the independent city of Salem, Virginia, United States. The locations of National Register properties and districts for which the latitude and longitude coordinates are included below, may be seen in an online map.

There are 20 properties and districts listed on the National Register in the city.

This National Park Service list is complete through NPS recent listings posted June 6, 2026.

== Current listings ==
	Name on the Register	Image	Date listed	Location	Description
1	Academy Street School	Academy Street School	October 1, 1981 (#81000648)	Academy St. 37°17′37″N 80°03′41″W	
2	Blair Apartments	Blair Apartments	June 12, 2017 (#100001084)	231 Chestnut St. 37°17′22″N 80°03′46″W	
3	Downtown Salem Historic District	Downtown Salem Historic District	June 5, 1996 (#96000591)	Roughly Main St. from Broad St. to College Ave. 37°17′35″N 80°03′24″W	
4	Evans House	Evans House	May 19, 1972 (#72001529)	213 Broad St. 37°17′41″N 80°03′35″W	
5	Hart Motor Company		February 7, 2024 (#100009960)	1341 E. Main Street; 37°17′50″N 80°02′00″W	
6	Main Campus Complex, Roanoke College	Main Campus Complex, Roanoke College	March 7, 1973 (#73002226)	Roanoke College; 37°17′45″N 80°03′20″W	
7	McVitty Home	McVitty Home	October 23, 2003 (#03001092)	601 W. Main St. 37°17′30″N 80°04′02″W	
8	Monterey		March 5, 1999 (#98001069)	110 High St. 37°17′41″N 80°03′13″W	NARA nomination form: 41683558 Virginia Historic Register: 129-0012
9	North Broad Street Historic District	North Broad Street Historic District	January 31, 2019 (#100003393)	200-500 blocks of N. Broad St. 37°17′45″N 80°03′35″W	
10	Old Roanoke County Courthouse	Old Roanoke County Courthouse	May 14, 1987 (#87000727)	301 E. Main St. 37°17′38″N 80°03′16″W	
11	Peacock-Salem Launderers and Cleaners	Peacock-Salem Launderers and Cleaners	January 24, 2019 (#100003350)	231 S. Colorado St. 37°17′27″N 80°03′20″W	
12	Preston House	Preston House	May 26, 2005 (#05000479)	1936 W. Main St. 37°17′16″N 80°05′27″W	Acreage expanded at the same address in a boundary increase of May 3, 2006
13	Roanoke Veterans Administration Hospital Historic District	Roanoke Veterans Administration Hospital Historic District	September 4, 2012 (#12000609)	1970 Roanoke Boulevard; 37°16′29″N 80°01′08″W	
14	Salem Post Office	Salem Post Office	September 24, 1992 (#92001265)	103 E. Main St. 37°17′36″N 80°03′24″W	
15	Salem Presbyterian Church	Salem Presbyterian Church	October 15, 1974 (#74002245)	E. Main and Market Sts. 37°17′36″N 80°03′25″W	
16	Salem Presbyterian Parsonage	Salem Presbyterian Parsonage	January 28, 1992 (#91002017)	530 E. Main St. 37°17′38″N 80°03′05″W	
17	Southwest Virginia Holiness Association Camp Meeting	Southwest Virginia Holiness Association Camp Meeting	January 22, 1996 (#95001558)	202 and 208 E. 3rd St. 37°17′16″N 80°03′15″W	
18	Valley Railroad Bridge	Valley Railroad Bridge	August 12, 2009 (#09000617)	1002 Newman Dr. 37°18′15″N 80°02′40″W	
19	Valleydale Packers Inc.	Valleydale Packers Inc.	January 31, 2019 (#100003394)	710 E. 8th St. 37°16′57″N 80°02′44″W	
20	Williams-Brown House and Store	Williams-Brown House and Store	November 23, 1971 (#71001050)	523 E. Main St. 37°17′41″N 80°02′52″W	Occupied by the Salem Museum and Historical Society

== See also ==
- List of National Historic Landmarks in Virginia
- National Register of Historic Places listings in Virginia
- National Register of Historic Places listings in Roanoke, Virginia
- National Register of Historic Places listings in Roanoke County, Virginia
