= Starkey =

Starkey may refer to:

== Places ==
=== United States ===
- Starkey, New York, a town
  - Starkey United Methodist Church, on the National Register of Historic Places
- Starkey, Oregon, an unincorporated community
- Starkey, Virginia, an unincorporated community
  - Starkey School, a former school building on the National Register of Historic Places
- Starkey Township, Logan County, North Dakota
- Starkey Wilderness Preserve, a nature preserve in Pasco County, Florida

=== Canada ===
- Starkey Hill, the highest point in Puslinch Township, Ontario

== Other uses ==
- Starkey (surname), people with the surname Starkey
- Starkey baronets, a title in the Baronetage of the United Kingdom
- Operation Starkey, a Second World War sham Allied invasion
- Starkey International Institute for Household Management, a school for butlers, in Denver, Colorado, US
- Starkey Hearing Technologies, a hearing aid manufacturer located in Eden Prairie, Minnesota, US

== See also ==
- Starkie (Scottish spelling)
- Stark (disambiguation)
