= Starkey (surname) =

Starkey is a surname. Notable people with the surname include:

- Damien Starkey (born 1982), American producer, songwriter, composer, and musician
- Dan Starkey (actor), British actor
- David Starkey, English historian and television presenter
- David Starkey (maritime historian), British historian
- Dean Starkey, American pole vaulter
- Drew Starkey (born 1993), American actor
- George Starkey (alchemist), English-American alchemist
- James Leslie Starkey (1895–1938), Archaeologist
- Jason Starkey, American football player
- Jennie O. Starkey (ca. 1856 – 1918), American journalist
- Jerome Starkey (born 1981), English journalist, broadcaster and author
- Jim Starkey, database architect
- Joe Starkey, American sports announcer
- Kyle Starkey, British DJ and producer
- Maureen Starkey Tigrett (1946–1994), first wife of Ringo Starr
- Phyllis Starkey, English politician
- Ringo Starr (born Richard Starkey in 1940), British musician, The Beatles
- Robert Lyman Starkey (1899–1991), American microbiologist
- Thomas Starkey, English humanist writer
- Zak Starkey (born 1965), English musician, son of Ringo

== See also ==
- Starkey Baronets, a family in Nottingham, England
- Starkey (disambiguation)
- Starkie
