= Tazewell M. Starkey =

Tazewell Merriman Starkey (c. 1829–1901) was a farmer, banker and civic leader in Roanoke County, Virginia. Born in Franklin County, Virginia and moved to Roanoke County, Virginia, in 1850. "He was a son of Mr. and Mrs. Jack Starkey, and was educated in the private schools of his native county... In May, 1865, he was married to Henrietta P. Harvey, daughter of Colonel and Mrs. Robert Harvey, of Roanoke County, and as a result of that union there were four children; namely, Mrs. Junior W. White, of Cave Spring; Mrs. Eliza B. Smith, of Roanoke; II. Clay Starkey, of Roanoke; and Joseph G. Starkey, who resides at the old homestead."

During the Civil War, he served in the 5th Virginia Cavalry. He was wounded during the Seven Days Battles and had three horses shot out from underneath him during the war.

== Speedwell Plantation ==
After his marriage of Henrietta P. Harvey, he and his wife lived in Speedwell Plantation. "Speedwell" was built by Colonel Lewis Speedwell Harvey (1785–1842). In 1819, he acquired a 7,000-acre tract in the south part of Roanoke County, Virginia. Harvey built a furnace for iron production near what is now the village of Starkey. As a result of the abundant supply of brown Hematite found in the area, the Harvey Furnace soon gained an excellent reputation for producing iron of very high quality. His house was completed in 1831. Soon after it was named for the English ship, the Speedwell, that according to family tradition brought Harvey's ancestors to America. "Speedwell", is a classic I-form Virginia house made of brick. Harvey's granddaughter, Henrietta Powers Harvey Starkey, contracted Gustave A. Sedon for remodeling work and to construct a Greek Revival porch and door case on the I-form in May 1877. The unusual door case at Speedwell is in the style of Sedon's work, who also worked on the 1849 Greek Revival home, Belle Aire, in Roanoke. The similarity between back porch columns on Hollins College's main dormitory (records show Sedon as the carpenter) and the front porch columns of Speedwell confirm his work on both.

== First National Bank ==
After the war, Starkey became the director of the First National Bank (Roanoke, Virginia). "The structure served as the headquarters of the first bank founded in Roanoke following its incorporation by the General Assembly in 1882. Established to facilitate the financial transactions of the Shenandoah Valley Railroad, the First National Bank subsequently followed a career that closely paralleled the growth of the city into the leading financial and industrial center of Southwest Virginia."

== Public Service ==
For 28 years he was a member of the county Board of Supervisors from the Cave Spring District. He also was a member of numerous committees, commercial enterprises and civic organizations. He was especially interested in rural education, and provided land and support for the Starkey School near his home.

A photograph of him and short biography is also available from a Franklin County, Virginia, genealogical website.

== Legacy ==
Starkey, Virginia is named in his honor. So is Starkey School and the two roads that intersect at Starkey school are named for his family: Starkey Street and Merriman Road. He was a member of the Roanoke County School Board, Cave Springs District, from 1873 to 1895. The nearby Starkey Park in Roanoke, County, is also named for him.
