= Greater Deyerle, Roanoke, Virginia =

Greater Deyerle
- Roanoke Neighborhood
- Interactive map of Greater Deyerle
- Coordinates: 37°15′27″N 80°1′13″W
- Country: United States
- State: Virginia
- City: Roanoke

Population (2006)
  - Total: 3,810
- Time zone: UTC-5 (EST)
  - Summer (DST): UTC-4 (EDT)
- ZIP Codes: 24018
- Area code: 540

Greater Deyerle is a Roanoke, Virginia neighborhood located in extreme southwest Roanoke. It borders the neighborhoods of Raleigh Court on the east, Cherry Hill on the north, the city of Salem on the west and Roanoke County on the south. Greater Deyerle is geographically the most western area of the city of Roanoke.

Annexed from Roanoke County in 1976 to connect to the city's water/sewer service, the neighborhood is predominantly residential with commercial developments located at its edges. Although the majority of its development has occurred post World War II, both the historic Belle Aire and Lone Oaks estates are listed on the National Register of Historic Places. Because these two 19th-century estates were constructed by Benjamin Deyerle, the neighborhood is named after him.
