= Blair Apartments =

Historic residential building in Virginia, United States

- U.S. National Register of Historic Places
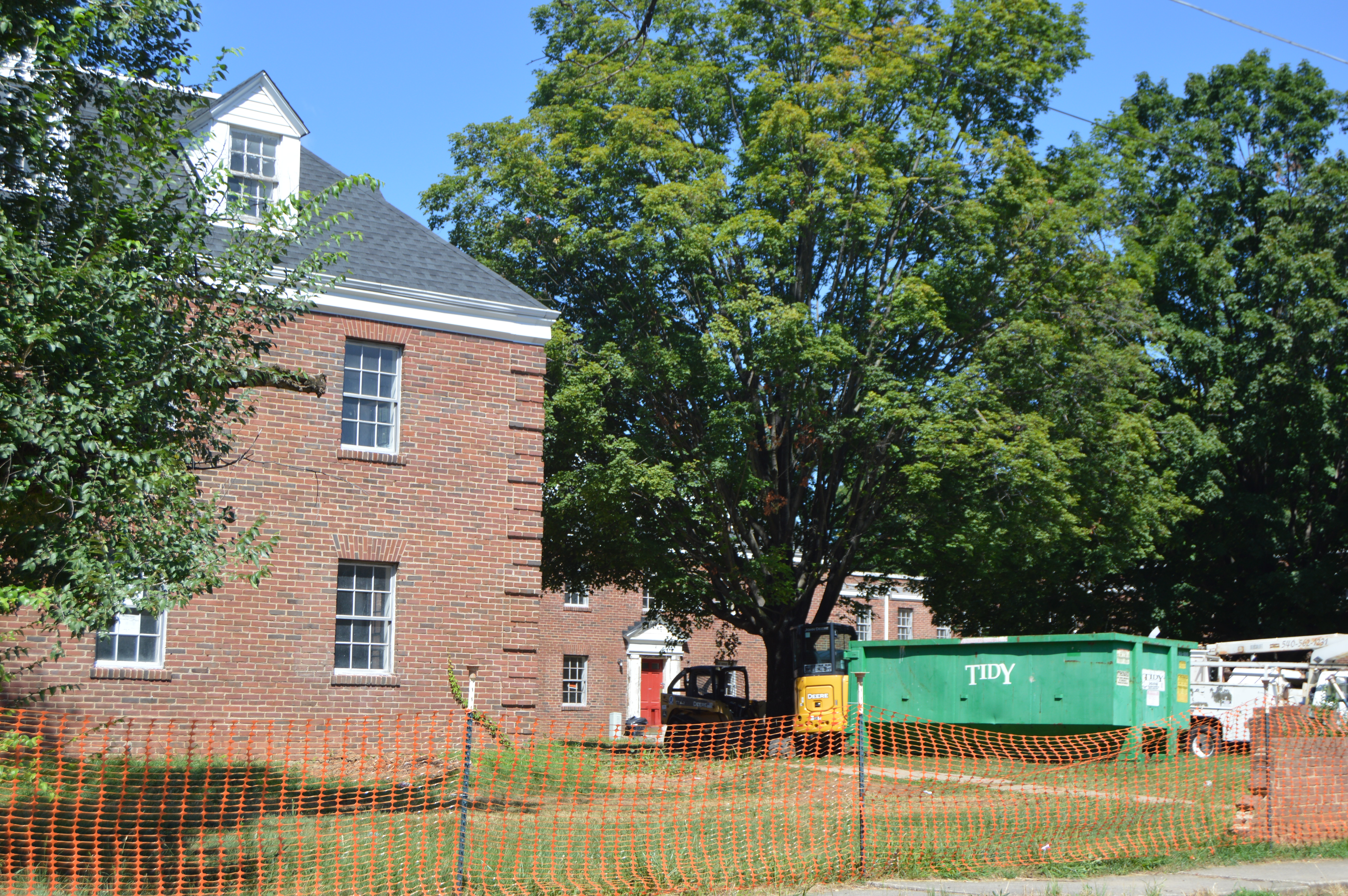

- Location within Virginia Location within the United States
- Location: 231 Chestnut St., Salem, Virginia
- Coordinates: 37°17′22″N 80°3′46″W
- Area: 2 acres (0.81 ha)
- Built: 1949
- Architectural style: Colonial Revival
- NRHP reference No.: 100001084
- Added to NRHP: June 12, 2017

The Blair Apartments are a historic residential apartment complex at 231 Chestnut Street in Salem, Virginia. They consist of a series of seven connected buildings, forming a rough U shape on the west side of the street. They were built in 1949 with funding from the Federal Housing Administration (FHA), and are a well-preserved example of the types of buildings the FHA funded. Salem experienced a population boom in the years following World War II, prompting its construction.

The complex was added to the National Register of Historic Places in 2017.

== See also ==
- National Register of Historic Places listings in Salem, Virginia
