= Lone Oaks =

Historic house in Virginia, United States

- U.S. National Register of Historic Places
- Virginia Landmarks Register
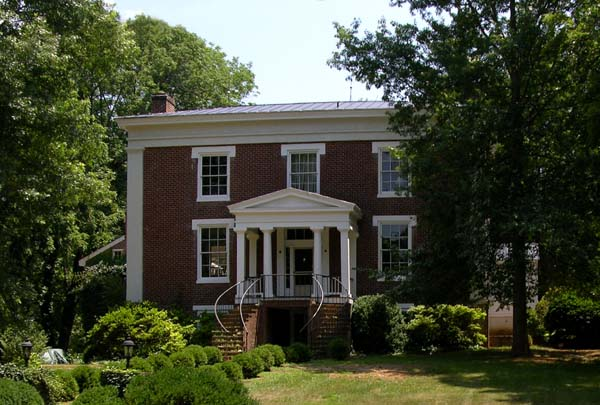
- From Grandin Road

- Location within Virginia Location within the United States
- Location: 3402 Grandin Road Extension SW, Roanoke, Virginia
- Coordinates: 37°14′56″N 80°0′17″W
- Area: 2.9 acres (1.2 ha)
- Built: 1852
- Built by: Deyerle, Benjamin
- Architectural style: Classical Revival
- NRHP reference No.: 73002054
- VLR No.: 128-0010

Significant dates
- Added to NRHP: April 11, 1973
- Designated VLR: January 16, 1973

Lone Oaks, also known as the Benjamin Deyerle Place and Winsmere, is a Greek Revival mansion listed on both the National Register of Historic Places and the Virginia Landmarks Register in the Greater Deyerle neighborhood of the independent city of Roanoke, Virginia. Located at 3402 Grandin Road Extension SW, Lone Oaks was completed in 1850 as the private residence of Benjamin Deyerle overlooking Mudlick Creek. Today the home still stands, with the surrounding area now developed as single family home typical of those built during the 1970s–1980s. Today the home remains as a private residence. The house is L-shaped with a single pediment Doric entrance portico, which has plain square pillars and fluted columns. It became a Virginia Historic Landmark and was listed on the National Register of Historic Places in 1973.

== Main house ==
"A two-story, L-shaped brick house with three bay facade, rigid symmetry, parged antae and full entablature, Lone Oak is well within the form and style of the other houses Benjamin Deyerle erected during his most prolific period, between 1848 and 1851. Today, Lone Oaks retains its original, well proportioned Doric Portico with Pediment supported by paired groups of outside pillars and inside columns."

== Outbuildings ==
Several 19th-century outbuildings on the Lone Oaks property are interesting. They date from the construction of the main house or later. Many of the bricks used are rejects from the primary selection, and some are friable and partially deteriorated.

=== Springhouse ===
A two-story spring house and dwelling or office is built into the side of Mud Lick Creek where a spring keeps the basement cool. The limestone foundation and brick walls has an entrance to the dwelling area from the uphill side, and has a large fireplace and chimney.

=== Slave quarters ===
The slave quarters, barracoon, office and dwelling has two over two rooms, and is made from brick with 13" walls. All the rooms are heated by fireplaces. The south room on the first floor has a large fireplace and may have been used as an outdoor kitchen for the house.

=== Smokehouse ===
The Smokehouse is a two-story, front gabled brick structure. Many of the bricks used in the construction are durable, but were probably rejected as being too imperfect to be used on the walls of the main house.

=== Privy ===
The privy is a curious construction, for a long mis-identified as a brick kiln. Because it had a flue ventilated chimney, it was mistakenly viewed as a fireplace for heating the bricks. However, there is no fireplace at all, and was used only for ventilation.
