= Wrongful conviction of Paul Blackburn =

British man wrongly convicted of murder

Paul Blackburn
- Born: July 1, 1963 (age 62); Salford, England
- Known for: Wrongful conviction and subsequent exoneration for attempted murder, having served nearly 25 years in prison.
- Criminal status: Conviction overturned (2005)

Paul Blackburn (born 1 July 1963, Salford) is a British man who was convicted at the age of 15 of attempted murder, served a life sentence, and was later found to have been wrongly convicted. He served nearly 25 years in prison.

== Crime and investigation ==
Blackburn was accused and convicted of the attempted rape and attempted murder of a 9-year-old boy, that took place on 25 June 1978. Whether or not this crime occurred is not contested. The 9-year-old boy had been sexually assaulted, kicked, stabbed, and left buried under debris in a brick shelter before being found some 28 hours later. Blackburn was 14 when the crime was committed. He was initially interviewed by the police on 3 July 1978, after he had turned 15. His second police interview was ten days later, and during this he gave a different account of his locations on the day of the crime. In a third interview, Blackburn was questioned, without being cautioned, on the inconsistencies in his two accounts and was told that the description of the offender matched his own. During this interview Blackburn refused to take part in an identification parade or to provide forensic samples and verbally abused the police. Two of Blackburn's brothers, Fred and Harry, were also interviewed by the police.

Blackburn then confessed to the crime during another lengthy interview with the police, but later retracted his confession. The total length of this interview was four hours and twenty minutes, and there is no record of any breaks being taken. Three hours and ten minutes of the interview consisted of questioning by two senior police officers, and it was only at the end of this period that Blackburn made his confession. During this interview he did not have the services of a solicitor (he was not advised that he could consult one) and nor was he accompanied by a parent or guardian. He was accompanied by an adult, but during the appeal it was decided that this accompanying adult did little to support Blackburn's interests.

Blackburn was not the only suspect for the crime, nor even the only suspect who confessed to it during an interview. Indeed, his older brother Fred confessed but soon retracted his confession. Two other youths also confessed but then retracted.

== Conviction ==
Blackburn was convicted on 18 December 1978, at Chester Crown Court before Judge Bristow and was sentenced to life for the attempted murder and to two years (to be served concurrently) for the attempted rape.

== Appeal ==
There then followed a protracted process of appeals. Two appeal applications were initially refused, the first solely before a single judge in September 1979, and the second by the full court on 17 March 1981. In 1995, the Home Secretary was presented with a petition for Blackburn, but he found no grounds to refer the case for review.

Blackburn was released in March 2003. His prison sentence had been significantly lengthened because he continued to deny his guilt. In August 2004 Blackburn's case was reviewed by the Criminal Cases Review Commission and was referred to the court of appeal. This appeal was heard in the Royal Court of Justice, London and Blackburn's conviction was ruled to be unsafe and was therefore overturned on 24 May 2005, about 27 years after he was initially convicted. Lord Justice Keene conducted this hearing and Lord Carlisle, who was also part of the prosecution team in Blackburn's initial trial, represented the Crown. Blackburn was represented by Gabb & Co (of Powys).

== Reasons for the appeal verdict ==
During the appeal, evidence was provided by a forensic psychologist. This consisted of details on how false confessions (termed coerced compliant confessions) may be provided by young, vulnerable suspects. It was stated this can occur when they are fatigued by a process of prolonged questioning over which they feel they have no control. The suspect eventually cannot resist ending the interrogation by any means, the immediate necessity seeming far more important than long term implications. The psychologist also described how a suspect may also invent details during an interrogation.

There were several factors about the interview during which Blackburn confessed which contributed to the court of appeal's verdict. These include the lengthy questioning, the lack of a parent, guardian or solicitor, the fact that Blackburn was not advised of his entitlement to legal advice and the young age of Blackburn at the time.

During the appeal the Crown also admitted that Blackburn was prompted to make his confession, and therefore Judge's rules had been breached. In addition, evidence was found that the police were involved significantly with the wording used in Blackburn's statement of confession. It was felt by the appeal judges that, as this involvement had previously been denied on oath by the police, all the evidence they gave relating to the interview was therefore no longer reliable, with the Court of Appeal saying that the two police officers, DCI White and DI Marsh, "cannot have told the truth about the written confession."

The appeal court ruled that Blackburn's confession should never have been used as evidence in his trial, and that the other evidence was "circumstantial and of limited weight," further saying that "there was really no prima facie case against [Paul Blackburn]."

== Early life ==
Blackburn had a difficult childhood. His father was an alcoholic, who was often away at sea, but created a climate of fear in the household when present. Blackburn said that his father was violent towards the children, showed them no affection and verbally abused them.

As the sixth of eight children, Blackburn lived in cramped conditions with little privacy. There was also a lot of friction and hostility between the members of the Blackburn family, even aside from the father. Blackburn was not close to the other members of his immediate family, and had difficulty knowing how to react to affection from more distant relatives. He made friends at school, however, and spent as much time as possible with them, most of the time following normal childhood pursuits. At the age of 13, he went to Red Bank approved school in Lancashire.

== Prison life ==
Despite Blackburn's youth when he was convicted, he was sent to a prison mainly housing other convicted murderers and sex offenders. He was young compared to most prisoners and was a target for bullying from inmates and prison staff.During his incarceration, he spent 18 months in a punishment block at HM Prison Wormwood Scrubs.

Despite all these problems, Blackburn has said he found freedom in the act of fighting for his cause and also a freedom inside his own mind, which he came to realise could never be taken away. Blackburn believes that many people in prison have been wrongly convicted.

== See also ==
- List of miscarriage of justice cases
