= Pleasant Grove (Salem, Virginia) =

Historic house in Virginia, United States

- U.S. National Register of Historic Places
- Virginia Landmarks Register
- Location within Virginia Location within the United States
- Location: 4377 W. Main St., Salem, Virginia
- Coordinates: 37°16′13″N 80°8′31″W
- Area: 7.9 acres (3.2 ha)
- Built: 1853
- Built by: Deyerle, Joseph; et al.
- Architectural style: Greek Revival
- NRHP reference No.: 03000449
- VLR No.: 080-0025

Significant dates
- Added to NRHP: May 22, 2003
- Designated VLR: March 19, 2003

Pleasant Grove, also known as Joseph Deyerle House, Deyerle Homeplace, and Glenvar is a historic home located near Salem in Roanoke County, Virginia. It was built in 1853, and is a two-story, three-bay, Greek Revival-style brick dwelling. The front facade features a well-proportioned Ionic order portico with slender tapered, fluted columns. It also has an original sunroom measuring 7 feet by 14 feet. Also on the property are the contributing kitchen (now connected to the main house), spring house, smokehouse, servant's house, and privy.

Much of the woodwork was done by a carpenter named Gustave A. Sedon, who worked closely with both Joseph and his half-brother, Benjamin Deyerle. "One of the most interesting things about Pleasant Grove is the fine architectural detail on the front which was put out on the house by Gustavus Sedon (sic), a German carpenter/handyman contractor. The house has interesting Ionic columns which Sedon carved and a cast iron balcony up on the top which Sedon or Joseph Deyerle, the owner of the house, ordered from Lynchburg, Virginia or maybe from Richmond. Someday I'll pursue this iron work but its interesting to know that the exact ironwork is on the Witherow house in Lexington, Virginia, on a house on Main Street in Lynchburg, Virginia, and another building in Richmond, Virginia."

It was added to the National Register of Historic Places in 2003.
