= Gustave A. Sedon =

Gustave A. Sedon (c. 1820 – April 5, 1893), also known as Gustavus Sedon, was a carpenter and craftsman in nineteenth century Roanoke, Virginia. He is noted for his work on various public buildings, plantation homes, and university structures. Sedon is known primarily for his ornamental work on buildings, many of which are now listed on the National Register of Historic Places.

== Early life ==
Sedon was born in Mecklenburg-Vorpommern, Germany in about 1820, and as a young man immigrated to the United States. According to family lore, Sedon walked from his port of entry in Baltimore, Maryland, to Salem, Virginia, probably along the Great Wagon Road. He married Catherine Statler Sedon (1819 - 1900) of Salem, Virginia, daughter of Abraham Statler (1792 - 1853).

== Professional work ==
=== Belle Aire ===
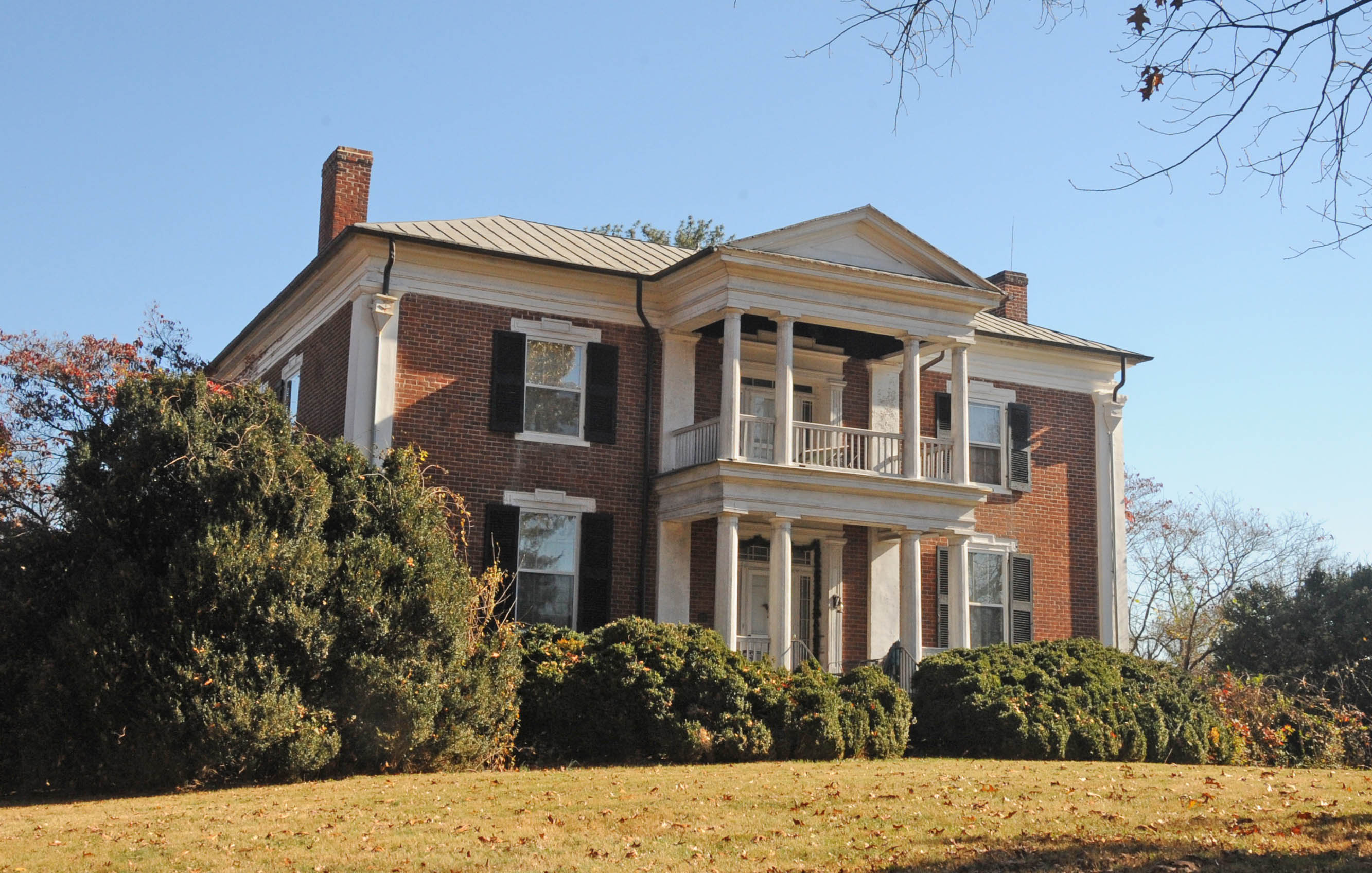
Sedon worked on much of the ornamental woodwork on Belle Aire

Belle Aire was constructed by Benjamin Deyerle and his carpenter Sedon for the Pitzer family in 1849. Its Greek Revival embellishments were influenced by the New England architect Asher Benjamin's publication The Practical House Carpenter of 1830. The L-shaped home is of brick construction with stuccoed Doric pilasters at the corners. Its most recoginizable feature is its 2-story pedimented portico four fluted Doric columns at each level. A kitchen addition replaced the original outbuilding and the side portico has been enclosed. Otherwise, Belle Aire remains much as it was in 1850, and as of 2023 is used as a private residence. It became a Virginia Historic Landmark in 1966 and was listed in the National Register of Historic Places in 1975.

=== Hollins College ===
The Main Building of Hollins College (now Hollins University) was decorated and enhanced by Sedon. His initial contract with the college on the Main Building began in 1860, but was interrupted during the Civil War. He wasn't finally paid for his work until 1866.Sedon was repeatedly requested back at the college through 1879 for work on porches, balustrades, interior woodwork, and other improvements and repairs. The Hollins College Quadrangle, of which Main Building is the centerpiece, was listed on the National Register of Historic Places in 1974.

=== Pleasant Grove Plantation ===
Sedon also did some major woodwork on the Pleasant Grove (Salem, Virginia). "One of the most interesting things about Pleasant Grove is the fine architectural detail on the front which was put out on the house by Gustavus Seadon (sic), a German carpenter/handyman contractor. The house has interesting Ionic columns which Sedon carved and a cast iron balcony up on the top which Sedon or Joseph Deyerle, the owner of the house, ordered from Lynchburg, Virginia or maybe from Richmond. Someday I'll pursue this iron work but its interesting to know that the exact ironwork is on the Witherow house in Lexington, Virginia, on a house on Main Street in Lynchburg, Virginia, and another building in Richmond, Virginia."

=== Salem Presbyterian Church ===
He was also employed to build the Salem Presbyterian Church (Salem, Virginia). "The master builder has not been determined but it seems likely that it was Benjamin Deyerle who built many of the finer Greek Revival plantation houses in the area. The church's woodwork is attributed to Gustavia D. Sedon (actually, Gustave A. Sedon), a well-known Roanoke County carpenter. Most of the architectural details are based on plates in ante-bellum builders' handbooks such as those of Asher Benjamin and Owen Biddle, Jr."

=== Speedwell Plantation ===
"Speedwell", was built by Colonel Lewis Speedwell Harvey (1785-1842) and later owned by his son-in-law, Tazewell M. Starkey, and is a classic I-form Virginia house made of brick. Harvey's granddaughter, Henrietta Powers Harvey Starkey, contracted Gustavus Sedon for remodeling work and to construct a Greek Revival porch and door case on the I-form in May 1877. The unusual door case at Speedwell is in the style of Sedon's work, who also worked on the 1849 Greek Revival home, Belle Aire, in Roanoke. The similarity between back porch columns on Hollins College's main dormitory (records show Sedon as the carpenter) and the front porch columns of Speedwell confirm his work on both.

== Death and burial ==
Sedon died on April 5, 1893, at age 73.
