= Starkie =

Starkie is a surname. Notable people with the surname include:

- Enid Starkie (1897–1970), Irish literary critic
- Martin Starkie (1922–2010), English actor, writer, and director
- Richard Starkie, British doctor
- Thomas Starkie (1782–1849), English lawyer and jurist
- Walter Starkie (1894–1976), Irish scholar, Hispanist, author, and musician

== See also ==
- Starkey (disambiguation)
