= HM Prison Wormwood Scrubs =

Prison in the London Borough of Hammersmith and Fulham, England

HMP Wormwood Scrubs
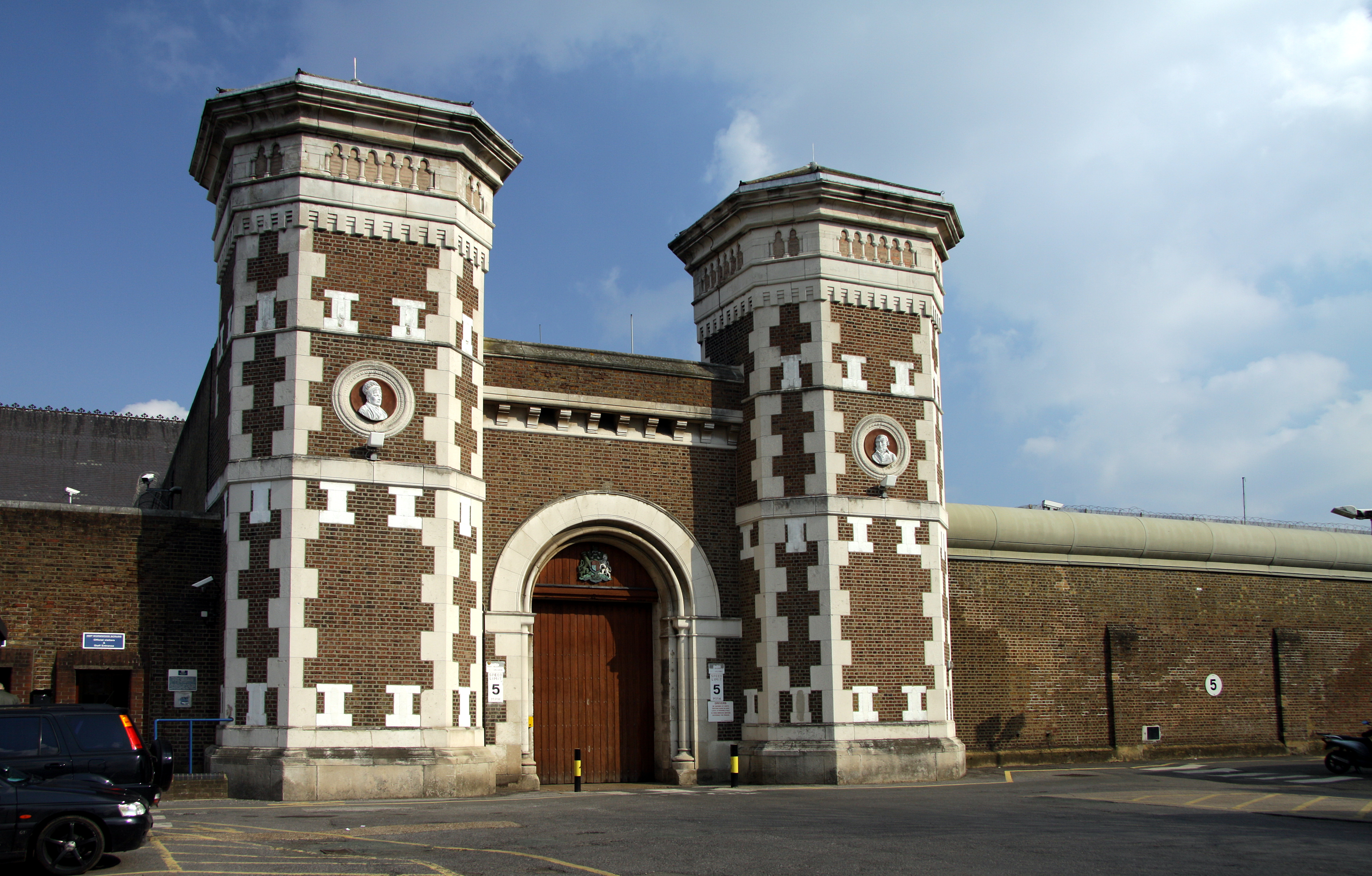
- Entrance to Wormwood Scrubs Prison

- Location within London Borough of Hammersmith and Fulham
- Location: Wormwood Scrubs, London, England; 51°31′0″N 0°14′25″W
- Status: Operational
- Security class: Adult Male/Category B
- Capacity: 1,273
- Population: 1,079 (21 June 2021)
- Opened: 1875; 151 years ago
- Managed by: His Majesty's Prison Service
- Governor: Amy Frost
- Website: www.justice.gov.uk/contacts/prison-finder/wormwood-scrubs

HM Prison Wormwood Scrubs (nicknamed "The Scrubs") is a Category B men's local prison, located in the White City area of the London Borough of Hammersmith and Fulham in West London, England, nearby Wormwood Scrubs open space. The prison is operated by His Majesty's Prison Service.

== History ==
The prison lies at the southern end of the ancient park of the same name. The area is first mentioned in 1189 as Wormhold Scrubs (lit. 'shrubland [by] snake-forest'). The name was later corrupted to "wormwood", referring to the herb Artemisia absinthium, traditionally used as a herb for the treatment of parasitic worms.

=== 19th century ===
The initial steps in the winter of 1874 involved the construction of a small prison made of corrugated iron and a temporary shed to serve as a barracks for the warders. Nine specially picked prisoners, all within a year of release, completed the buildings, after which 50 more prisoners were brought to erect a second temporary prison wing. Building then began on the permanent prison, with bricks being manufactured on site.

By the summer of 1875, enough bricks had been prepared to build the prison's first block and its ground floor was finished as winter began. Construction was completed in 1891. The designer was Sir Edmund Frederick Du Cane, who gave his name to the prison's road.

=== The First World War ===
The prison housed a number of conscientious objectors in the First World War, one of whom, the Quaker journalist Hubert W. Peet, wrote about the conditions there in 112 Days' Hard Labour (1917).

=== 1920 Hunger Strike ===
In April 1920 Irish Republican prisoners demanded political status, when denied they began a hunger strike which led to their eventual release. During the strike large crowds supporting the Irish hunger strikers gathered outside of the prison and were attacked by local residents with more than 70 injuries reported.

=== The Second World War ===
During the Second World War, the prison was taken over by the War Department with the majority of prisoners evacuated to other prisons.

The Security Service (MI5) was moved to Wormwood Scrubs two days before war broke out in 1939. This followed only three months in their previous location, an office on Rumney Street, which was deemed not large or secure enough for the rapidly expanding and essential department. Officers had a cell each while secretaries were two to a cell; many staff members became locked in their new offices during the first day post relocation. MI5's headquarters remained at Wormwood Scrubs until September 1940 when it was bombed during the Blitz and a number of documents were destroyed. Most departments were relocated to the more remote location of Blenheim Palace; counter-espionage operations continued out of London from a building on St James Street.

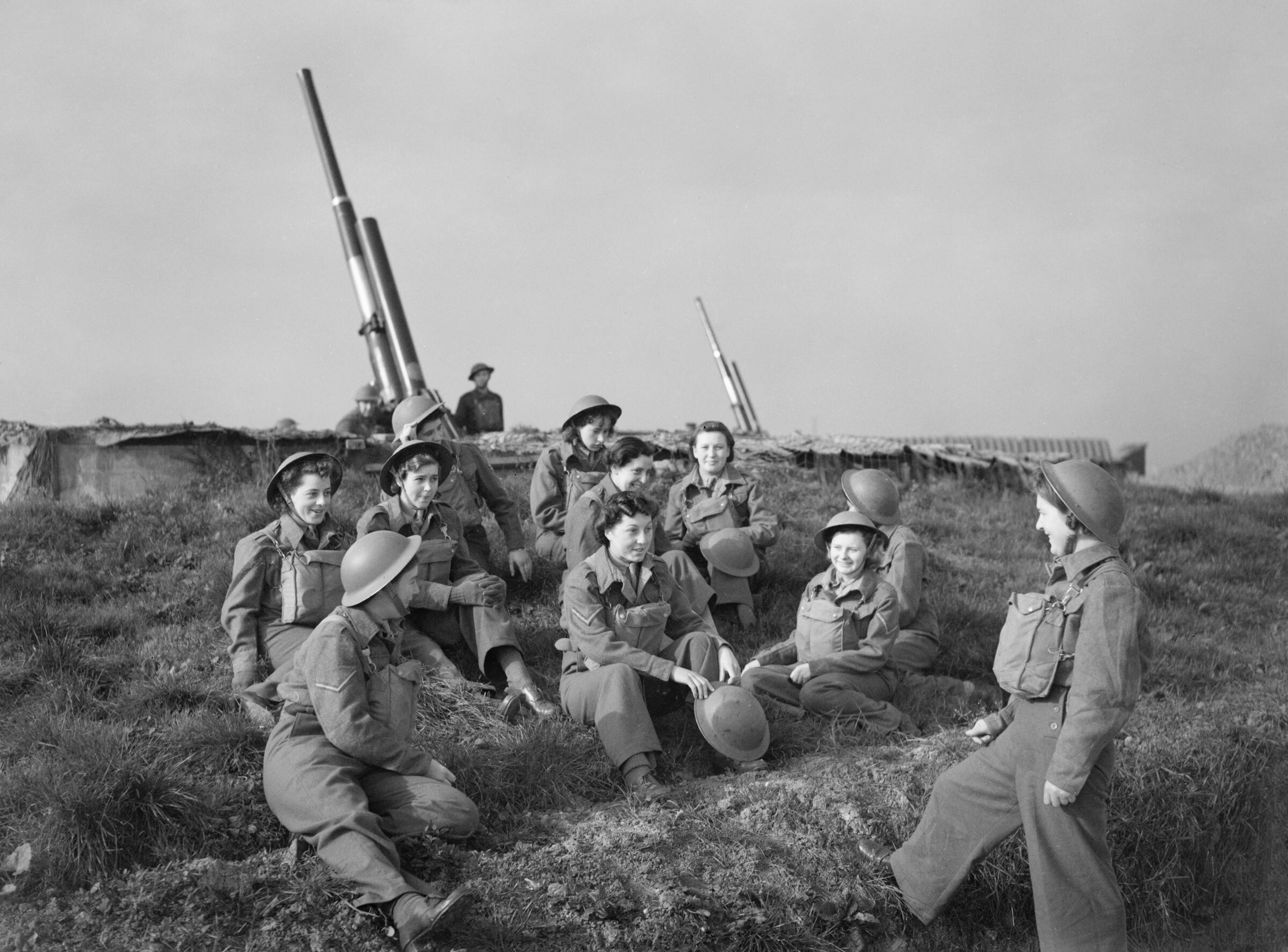
Auxiliary Territorial Service (ATS) women at a 3.7-inch anti-aircraft gun site 22 October 1941

The Radio Security Service, originally created by head of MI5 Vernon Kell before eventually being transferred to MI6, was also initially based at Wormwood Scrubs. Following the 1940 bombing they were relocated to Arkley View Estate in Barnet.

While MI5 occupied one block of the prison, a second block was occupied by the Chief Cable Censorship Department, an outstation of the Government Code and Cypher School (GC&CS) at Bletchley Park. This department remained at Wormwood Scrubs throughout the war.

Outside of the prison unit, the wider Wormwood Scrubs area was home to anti-aircraft sites operated by women of the Auxiliary Territorial Service (ATS).

=== Modern era ===
On 22 October 1966 KGB double-agent George Blake escaped from Wormwood Scrubs and fled to the Soviet Union.

In 1979, IRA prisoners staged a rooftop protest over visiting rights. Sixty inmates and several prison officers were injured. In 1982, an inquiry blamed much of the difficulties on failings in prison management. The governor, John McCarthy, had resigned before the rioting. In a letter to The Times, he had described Wormwood Scrubs as a "penal dustbin".

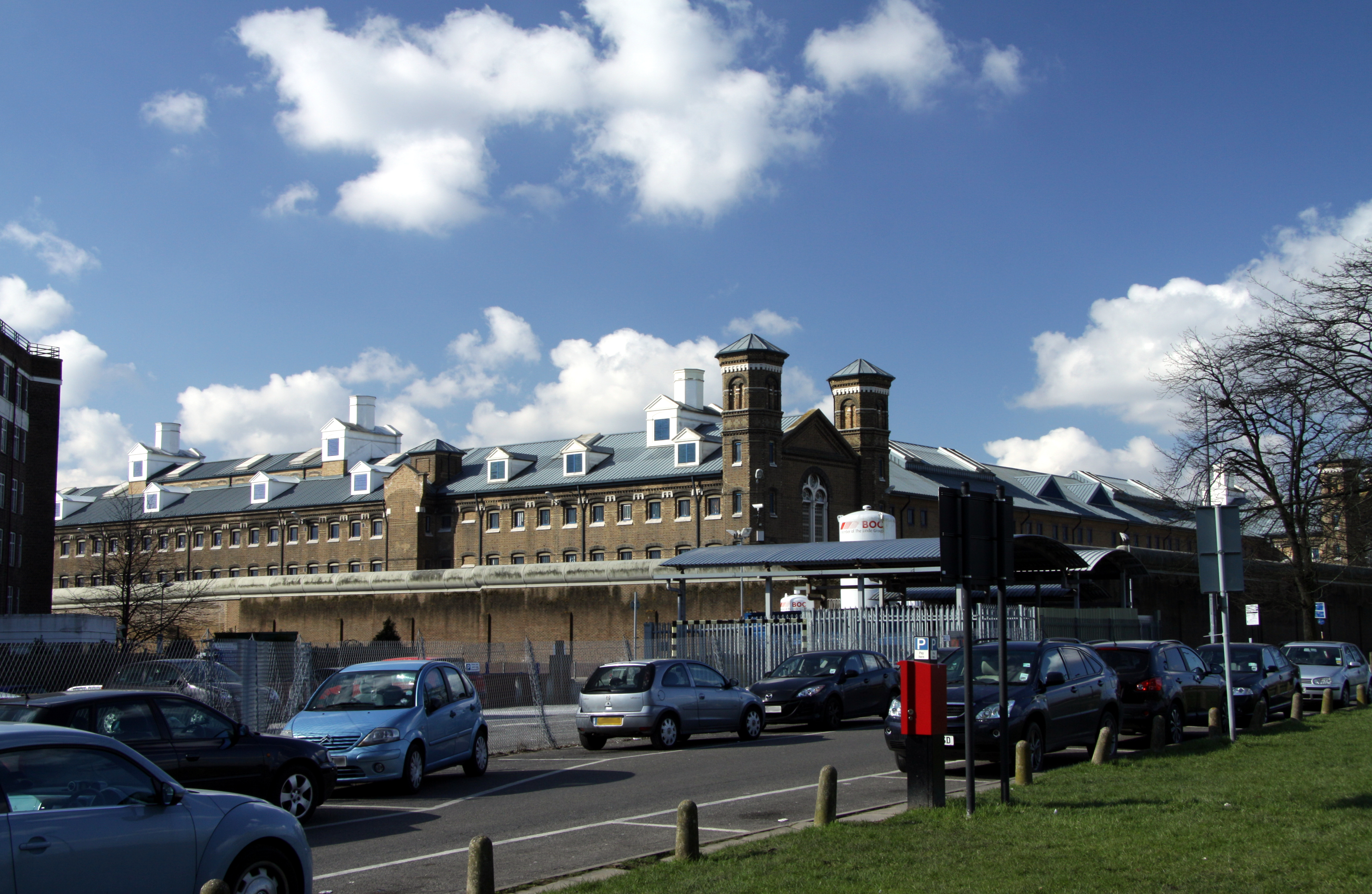
General view to the prison from park

In the 1990s, a police investigation into allegations of staff brutality resulted in the suspension of 27 prison officers and the conviction of six for assault, though three later won appeals against conviction. The Prison Service paid out more than three million pounds in out-of-court settlements with ex-prisoners who had alleged brutality. The chief inspector of prisons delivered a damning report on the conditions, in which the prison was told to improve or close.

In March 2004, a further report from the chief inspector stated that Wormwood Scrubs had greatly improved after making fundamental changes. Three quarters of inmates at the prison had said that staff treated them with respect, which was better than the national average. However, the report also stated that inmates spent too much time in their cells, and that only 36 per cent of eligible inmates were involved in education or work.

In November 2008, another report from the chief inspector stated that conditions at Wormwood Scrubs had deteriorated since the last inspection. Heightened prison gang activity had been detected, and 20 per cent of prisoners had failed drugs tests.

The prison cell blocks are Grade II listed, with the gatehouse given the higher Grade II* rating.

Major structural changes to the prison's management took place in 2013. In 2014, another report by the Inspectorate of Prisons was critical of the prison, describing it as "filthy". The inspectors also stated that there had been a failure to put into place recommendations by the prisons and probation ombudsman to deal with suicide and self-harm. The chief executive of the Howard League for Penal Reform, a charitable body, said "I have never seen a public service deteriorate so rapidly and so profoundly."

In 2017, the prison was reportedly overcrowded and some areas were strewn with litter and infested with rats and cockroaches. At the time of the inspection, there were 1,258 prisoners. Some were locked in their cells for 23 hours a day. The prison was reportedly dangerous for staff and inmates, and officers were concerned for their safety. There were 40 to 50 violent incidents a month. Chief Inspector Peter Clarke described "an extremely concerning picture" including, "intractable failings" continuing since earlier inspections from 2014.

In 2018, a prisoner was stabbed to death and three other prisoners were charged with his murder. On 30 August 2018 prisoner Winston Augustine committed suicide in the segregation unit after spending two days locked in a showerless cell with no food and without the tramadol prescribed for kidney stones that caused him pain. He was suffering from ketoacidosis due to starvation. A 2021 inquest subsequently identified the prison's failure to provide food and medication as contributing factors to the death; the facility's head of safer custody told the inquest she was "horrified" by the "wrongdoing".

In 2019, HM Inspectorate of Prisons found that although improvements had been made to make the prison safer, "the work was often not sufficiently embedded to have yet made enough difference to outcomes". Another inspection, in 2021, reported that improvements had been maintained and there were reductions in the levels of violence, though this was partly because many prisoners were locked in their cells for most of the day. At the time of the inspection there were 1,079 prisoners.

In 2024, a prisoner named Graham Gomm absconded after he had been taken to Hammersmith Hospital to be treated following him feeling unwell the day before.

In January 2026, 86 protesters supporting Palestine Action, a group proscribed as a terrorist organisation by the British government, were arrested at Wormwood Scrubs Prison after attempting to enter restricted areas of the facility. The Metropolitan Police stated that the group obstructed prison staff, threatened officers, and refused to leave when instructed. The incident attracted media attention and a response from a Ministry of Justice spokesperson.

== The prison today ==
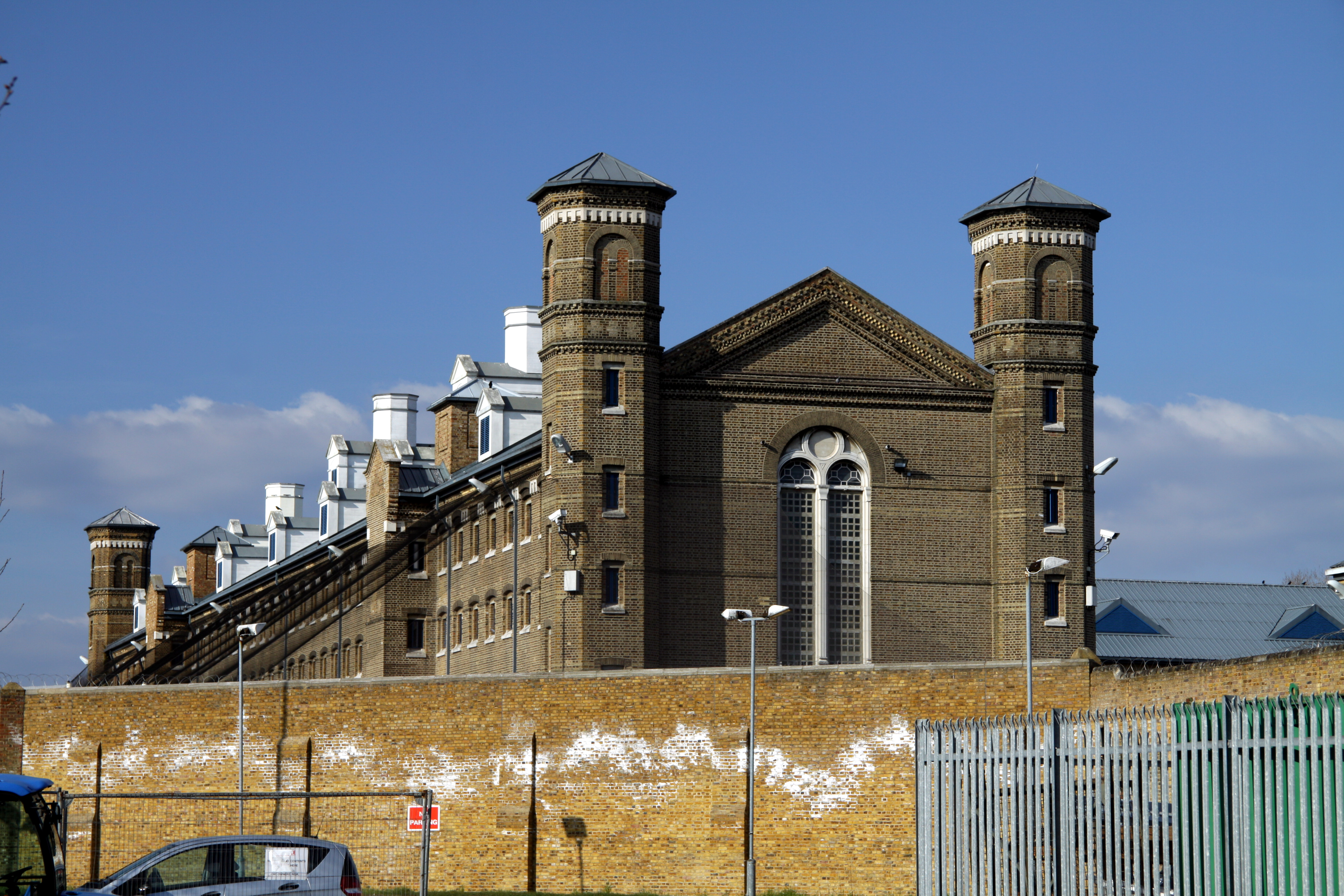
Building inside the prison area

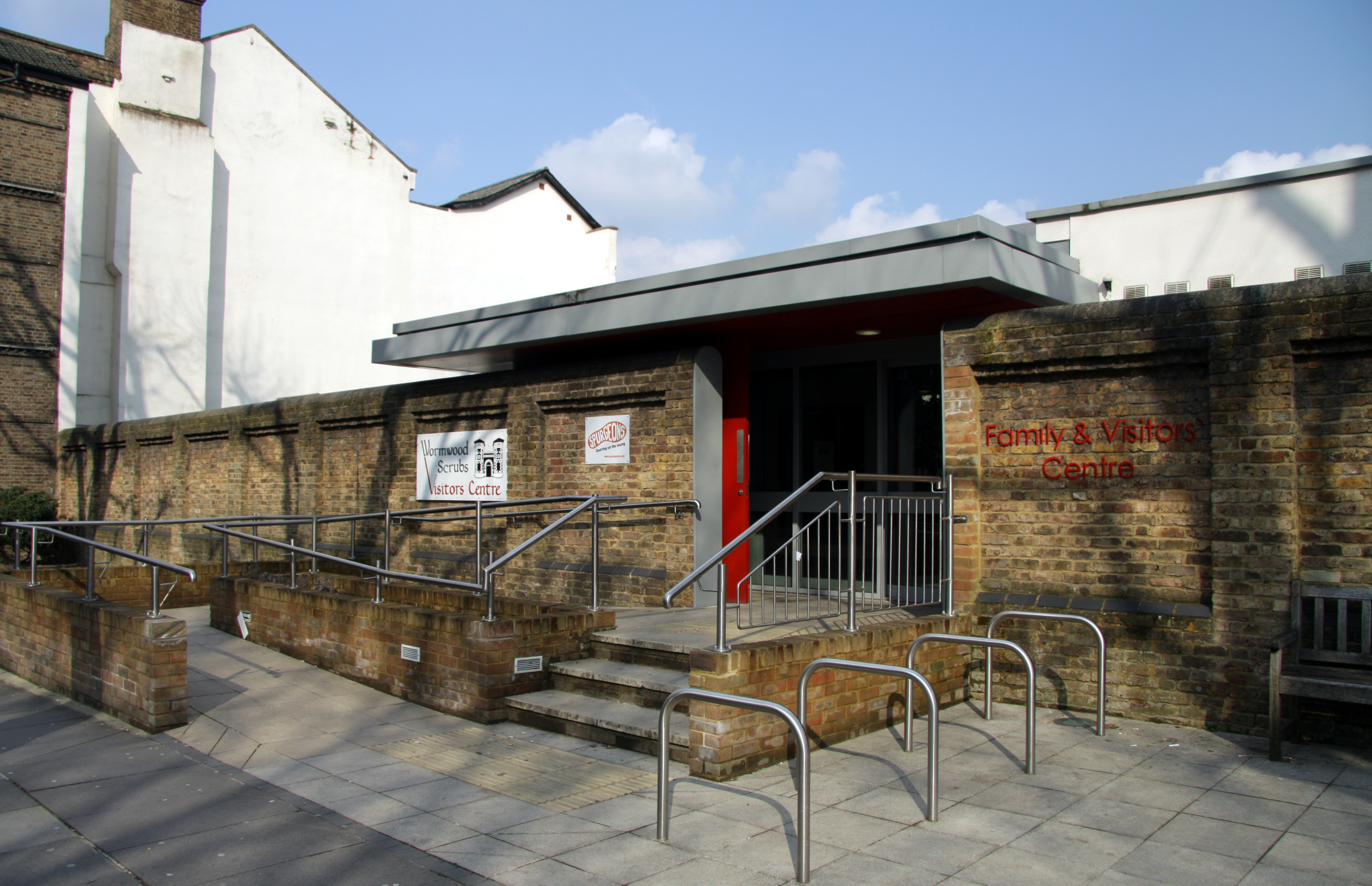
Visitor centre of the prison

Wormwood Scrubs is a Category B prison for adult males, sentenced or on remand from the local courts. The prison has five main wings and a number of smaller dedicated units. All accommodation includes electricity, integral sanitation, a TV, and accompanying bedroom furniture:

- A wing – remand and sentenced prisoners
- B wing – induction wing
- C wing – remand and sentenced prisoners
- D wing – remand and sentenced prisoners and high risk prisoner requiring single cells
- E wing – remand and sentenced prisoners and high risk prisoner requiring single cells
- Conibeere Unit – prisoners who require a substance misuse stabilisation regime
- First Night Centre – for prisoners during their first days in custody

There is a prison shop previously run by Aramark, but now run by DHL Supply Chain.

The two oval plaster reliefs on the front of the prison depict Elizabeth Fry and John Howard, both well known figures in prison reform.

The Home Office employs seven immigration officers that are permanently based at HMP Wormwood Scrubs. They are tasked with dealing with foreign national offenders who meet the criteria for deportation.

== Notable inmates ==
- Paul Blackburn
- George Blake
- Reginald Horace Blyth
- Horatio Bottomley
- Ian Brady
- Charles Bronson
- Basil Bunting
- Fred Copeman
- Peter Samuel Cook aka The Cambridge Rapist
- Rupert Croft-Cooke
- Pete Doherty
- Lord Alfred Douglas
- Michael Gaughan
- Leslie Grantham
- John Hampson
- Nicholas van Hoogstraten
- John Hopkins
- John Barnard Jenkins
- Thomas Jones, Baron Maelor
- Mike Lesser
- Saunders Lewis
- Konon Molody (alias Gordon Lonsdale)
- William Montagu, 9th Duke of Manchester
- Mark Morrison
- Timmy Murphy
- William Beauchamp Nevill.
- Dennis Nilsen
- Nines
- Ivor Novello
- Joseph Pearce
- Owen Philipps, 1st Baron Kylsant
- Geoffrey Potocki de Montalk
- Bruce Reynolds leader of The Great Train Robbery
- Keith Richards
- Nikos Sampson
- Koci Selamaj
- Richard Starkie
- John Stonehouse
- Michael Tippett
- Lewis Valentine
- Peter Wildeblood
- David John Williams
- Digga D
