= Evergreen (Rocky Mount, Virginia) =

Historic house in Virginia, United States

- Evergreen-Callaway-Deyerle House
- U.S. National Register of Historic Places
- Virginia Landmarks Register
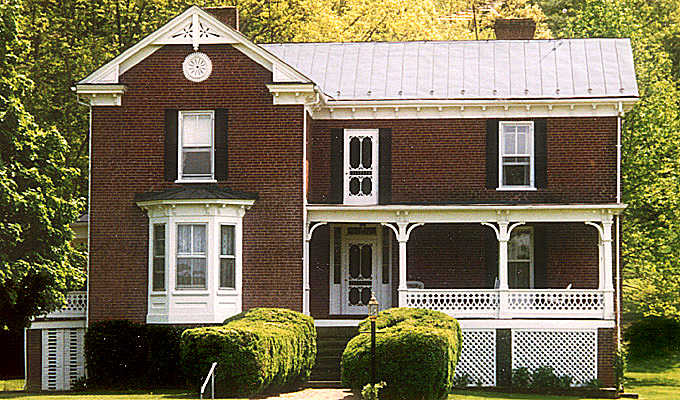
- Evergreen house in July 2013

- Location within Virginia
- Location: 536 Coles Cr. Rd., near Rocky Mount, Virginia
- Coordinates: 37°00′54″N 79°58′20″W
- Area: 0 acres (0 ha)
- Built: c. 1840, c. 1861
- Architectural style: Greek Revival, Italianate
- NRHP reference No.: 99001504
- VLR No.: 033-0214

Significant dates
- Added to NRHP: December 9, 1999
- Designated VLR: September 15, 1999

Evergreen, also known as the Callaway-Deyerle House, is an historic home located near Rocky Mount, Franklin County, Virginia. The original section, now the rear ell, was built about 1840, is a two-story, two-bay, rectangular brick dwelling with a hipped roof in a vernacular Greek Revival style. A two-story front section in the Italianate style was added about 1861. A side gable and wing addition was built at the same time. Also on the property are a contributing silo (c. 1861), barn (c. 1920), and tenant house (c. 1930). The silo on site is one of the earliest all brick grain silos in this part of the country.

Part of the original estate was built by Benjamin Deyerle.

It was listed on the National Register of Historic Places in 1999.
