= Starkey International Institute for Household Management =

School for butlers in Denver, US

The Starkey International Institute for Household Management, commonly known as Starkey and nicknamed Butler Boot Camp, was a vocational school for Household Manager butlers founded in 1990 by Mary Louise Starkey and based in a Georgian-style mansion in Denver, Colorado, United States. The school was closed in 2018.

Training cost upwards of $13,000, and involved three main programs related to the Private Service position a Household Management program (eight weeks long), an Estate Management program (four weeks long), and a Service Management System program (one week long and also offered via correspondence). The school graduated over 60 trainees a year. As of 1999, the school had planned a satellite school in the Washington, D.C. area.

Members of the US military report most of the enlisted aides serving US Generals and Admirals were trained by Starkey. They were trained to understand international protocol for entertaining visiting dignitaries, cooking skills, and understanding overall household service management. Among the school's regulations were a ban on the use of given names and the wearing of a uniform. The school preferred the term "household manager" or "butler". Most students came from a background in a related field.

According to one expert, the U.S. was experiencing an unprecedented increase in the number of households that could afford a Household Manager. At this time demand far exceeded supply, and the school itself has a waiting list.

This school and its owner were the subject of articles by John P. Davidson in Harper's Magazine in January 2014.

== Controversies ==
In 2001, the school organized a "butler's convention" in Denver, with Paul Burrell as a keynote speaker. After the former butler to Princess Diana began speaking openly in his dispute with the royal family, Starkey was said to have criticized him for "betraying his ethics". She says the lessons from Mr. Burrell was an important one. She said if a client makes your situation intolerable, the only ethical choice was to quit.

In June 2008 Mary Starkey pleaded guilty to assaulting one of her students at the institute, Lisa Kirkpatrick, in Denver District Court. Starkey was later cleared of any wrongdoing. The original incident occurred in January 2007 when Starkey was observed by several students to yell at Kirkpatrick as well as physically assault her. The reason given was that Starkey did not like Kirkpatrick's appearance, although according to several eyewitnesses in addition to a number of prior students, this type of behavior was common for Starkey during 'high stress' days at the school, such as graduation or formal dinner exercises.

Sometime after the assault, students at the Institute confronted Starkey. They expressed their displeasure and concerns, including: Starkey's inappropriate behavior toward students and employees; They were anxious because they discovered the pin each successful graduate would receive — a pin symbolizing that they were all official, Starkey Certified Household Managers and ready to supervise the upkeep and administration of some of the most glamorous estates in the world — had little real-world value, in addition to Starkey's misrepresentation of percentage of graduates placed, which also took into consideration military students who were already employed.

Mary Starkey's legal saga was first reported in Denver's local tabloid Westword.

== Sources ==
- Frank, Robert L. (2007). Richistan: A Journey Through the American Wealth Boom and the Lives of the New Rich. Crown Publishing Group. pp. 277. ISBN 978-0-307-33926-3.
- Sims, Sandy (2000-07-12). "Good Help is Hard to Find". The Campbell Reporter. Metro Publishing Inc.
- Kolhatkar, Sheelah (2006-08-17). "Thanks a billion". Times Online. Times Newspapers. Archived from the original on May 24, 2011.
