= Salem Presbyterian Church (Salem, Virginia) =

Historic church in Virginia, US

- U.S. National Register of Historic Places
- U.S. Historic district – Contributing property
- Virginia Landmarks Register
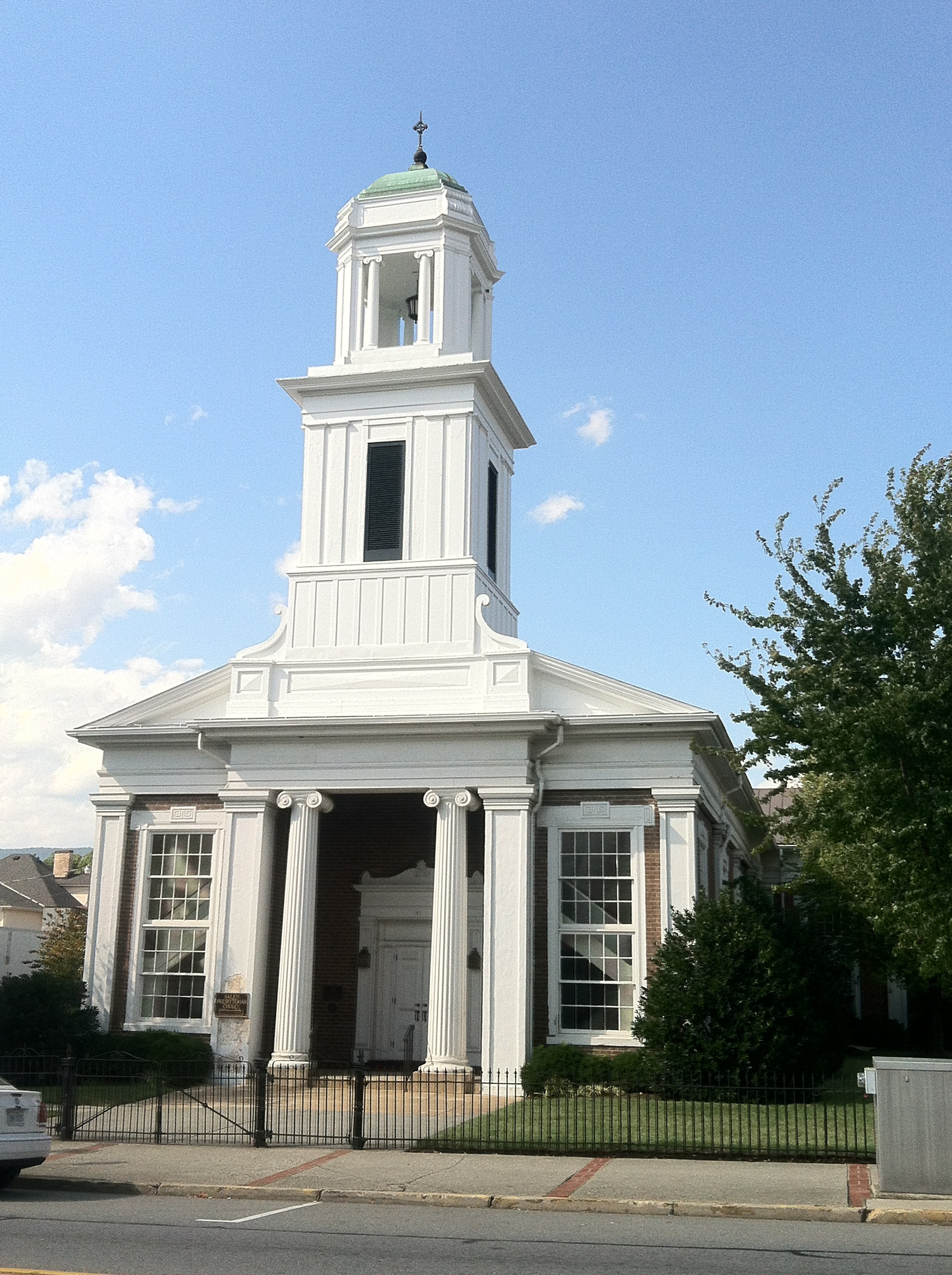
- Salem Presbyterian Church, September 2012

- Location within Virginia Location within the United States
- Location: E. Main and Market Sts., Salem, Virginia
- Coordinates: 37°17′34″N 80°3′26″W
- Area: less than one acre
- Built: 1851
- Built by: Deyerle, Benjamin
- Architectural style: Greek Revival
- NRHP reference No.: 74002245
- VLR No.: 129-0009

Significant dates
- Added to NRHP: October 15, 1974
- Designated VLR: June 18, 1974

Salem Presbyterian Church is a historic Presbyterian church at E. Main and Market Streets in Salem, Virginia. It was built in 1851–1852, and is a Greek Revival style temple form church. It has a slightly projecting Ionic order portico in antis with belfry. The church owned the Salem Presbyterian Parsonage from 1854 to 1941.

== History ==
The church currently sits on the land formerly owned by Benjamin Faris. When the county was formed, the newly installed justices were empowered to choose a time and place for holding their first court. "The time chosen was May 21, 1838; the place, Benjamin Fairs' tavern, where the Salem Presbyterian Church stands today."

"In 1831 Salem Presbyterian Church was organized with the remaining members from Ebenezer and Catawba churches."

Elijah McClanahan was an early member of the congregation. "He was also among the trustees chosen at the founding of the town of Salem, among the founding elders of Salem Presbyterian Church, and one of the largest landholders in the county."

Wildwood Presbyterian Church came from the Salem Church. "The church was originally a chapel of Salem Church and was organized separately in 1954."

== Construction ==
"The master builder has not been determined but it seems likely that it was Benjamin Deyerle who built many of the finer Greek Revival plantation houses in the area. The church's woodwork is attributed to Gustavia D. Sedon (Gustave A. Sedon), a well-known Roanoke County carpenter. Most of the architectural details are based on plates in ante-bellum builders' handbooks such as those of Asher Benjamin and Owen Biddle, Jr."

The Presbyterians organized in Salem in 1831. The local congregation outgrew their original church and began construction of the present building in 1851. Dedication services for the new building were held August 8, 1852. The church was built primarily with slave labor, and its bricks were burnt on the site. Its approximate cost was $4,500.00, and the entire amount was paid before the dedication service."

Originally, the only illumination for the sanctuary were two four-branched candelabras on either side of the pulpit. These were later replaced by oil lamps that were used until electrical wiring was installed. Two wood burning stoves, one each placed on the eastern and western walls, were used to keep the building warm. Firewood was placed against the wall inside the church to be used for stoking when the wood in the stove burned down during services.

The church was added to the National Register of Historic Places in 1974. It is located in the Downtown Salem Historic District.

== Bibliography ==
- Couper, William. History of the Shenandoah Valley, Vol. 11 ( N. Y., 1952).
- Gresham, Le Roy, William Hervey Woods, Bessie Johnston, Jessie Rhett, Robert E. Lee, and Bessie Johnston. Papers of Le Roy Gresham. 1780. Abstract: Papers including bound volume of manuscript poems by the Reverend William Hervey Woods; diary of Miss Bessie Johnston on a trip to Europe, 3 vols., 1872-73; diary of Miss Jessie Rhett of Mount Washington near Baltimore, 1895; two letterbooks of Le Roy Gresham, pastor of Chapel Hill, N.C. and later of Salem, Va., Presbyterian Church; 20 letters and notes of the Johnston family of Winchester, Va., 1862-97 including photostat of letter of Robert E. Lee to Bessie Johnston, 23 August 1869.
- Harvey, Collier S. Prelude to the Present. Salem, Va: Salem Presbyterian Church, 1981. "Printed as a part of the observance of the 150th anniversary."
- Roanoke's Architecture, unpublished catalogue of an architectural exhibit held in 1969, in archives of Virginia Historic Landmarks Commission.
- Salem Presbyterian Church (Salem, Va.). Salem Presbyterian Church; 2003 Directory. [Place of publication not identified]: [Olan Mills], 2003.
- Salem Presbyterian Church (Salem, Va.). Church Records, 1831-1967. [Virginia?]: [Eastern Microfilm?], 1968.
- Tingalia, Cathy. "Salem and the Salem Presbyterian Church," unpublished ms, in the archives of Virginia Historic Landmarks Commission.
- Wildwood Presbyterian Church (Salem, Va.). Church Records, 1954-1966. [Virginia?]: Eastern Microfilm, 1967.
