= Richard Starkie =

British doctor known as an abortion care provider

Richard William Starkie (1876–1937) was a British doctor who was charged with distributing illegal narcotics while providing abortions in 1921.

Starkie was a well-known London doctor who was a member of the Royal College of Surgeons, licentiate of the Royal College of Physicians, Police Surgeon for the Y Division of the Metropolitan Police, and medical officer to the St. Pancras Battalion. He began performing illegal abortions on women during the early 1900s. He continued providing abortions until his arrest on 17 July 1921, and was charged with administering narcotics for the purpose of providing an abortion for a married woman as well as prior abortion operations for four unmarried patients. The British Crown's case was prosecuted by Sir Richard David Muir. Although acquitted on the abortion charges, Starkie was found guilty for administering illicit drugs and sentenced to nine months hard labor at Wormwood Scrubs Prison. He was reportedly met by about 600 of his former patients following his release.

Starkie lost his medical qualifications as a physician and his name was removed from the Medical Register. In 1929, Starkie was convicted of illegally writing prescriptions for heroin. Due to Starkie's age and poor health, the judge changed the initial sentence of 12 months at hard labor to 12 months in prison.

After prison, Starkie and his wife used their home as a boarding house. He died in "relative obscurity" in 1937 at the age of 61.

== Other sources ==
- "New Evidence Not To Be Heard, Dr Starkie's Appeal". Hull Daily Mail. 22 November 1921. p. 6.
- "Surgeon's Appeal: "Remarkable and Unexpected Verdict"". The Evening Despatch. Birmingham. 28 November 1921. p. 3.
- "Dr. Starkie's Appeal: Appeal Court Affirms The Conviction". Birmingham Gazette. 29 November 1921. p. 2.
- Hallam, Christopher. White Drug Cultures and Regulation in London, 1916–1960. Cham: Palgrave Macmillan, 2018.
