= Southwest Virginia Holiness Association Camp Meeting =

- U.S. National Register of Historic Places
- Virginia Landmarks Register
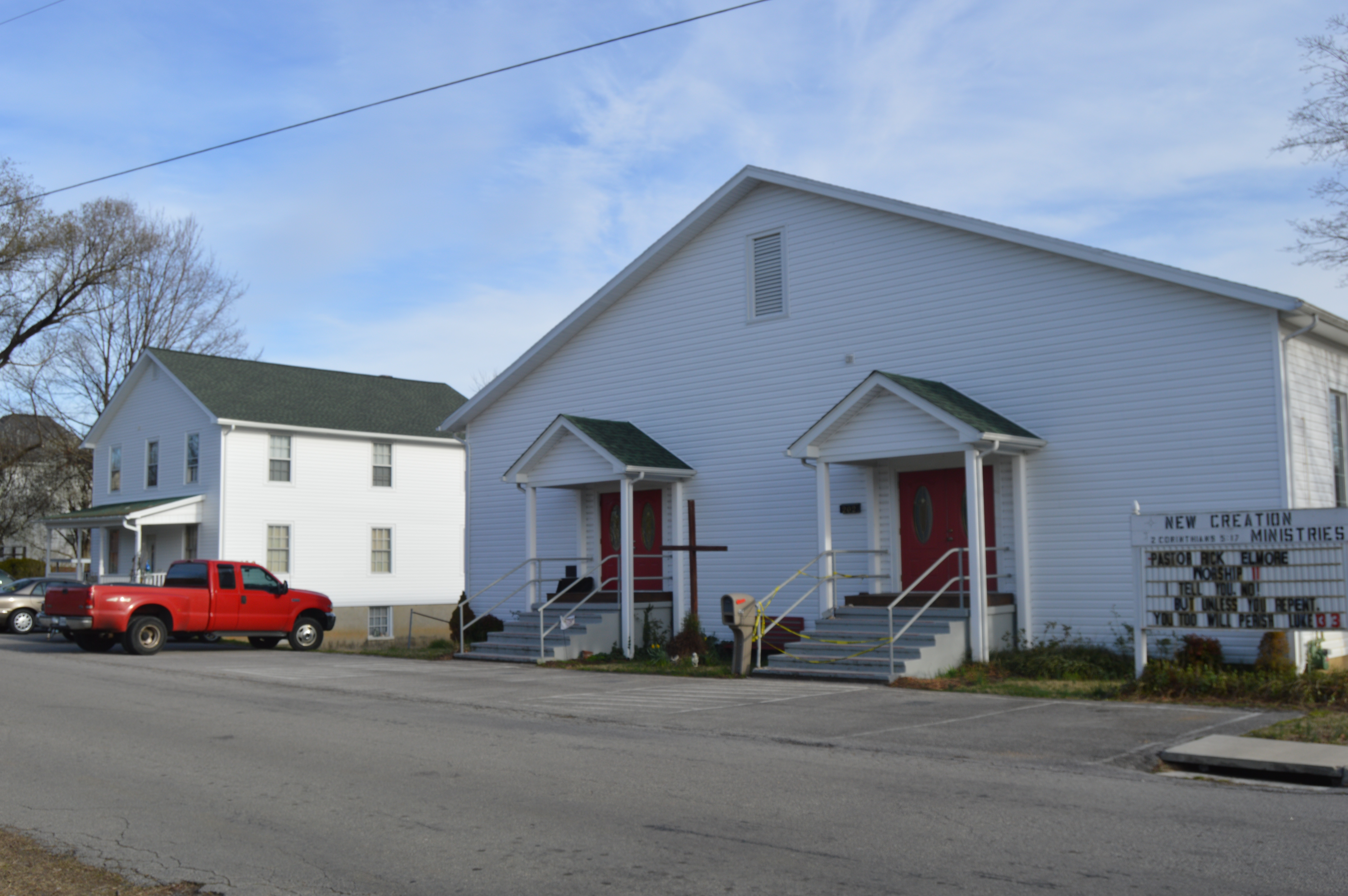
- Front of the two buildings

- Location within Virginia Location within the United States
- Location: 202 and 208 E. 3rd St., Salem, Virginia
- Coordinates: 37°17′15″N 80°3′15″W
- Area: 0.3 acres (0.12 ha)
- Built: 1922, 1926
- Built by: Milburn W. Graham
- NRHP reference No.: 95001558
- VLR No.: 129-0123

Significant dates
- Added to NRHP: January 22, 1996
- Designated VLR: October 18, 1994

Southwest Virginia Holiness Association Camp Meeting, also known as the Salem Camp Meeting, is a historic camp meeting complex located at Salem, Virginia. The complex consists of two buildings—a 1922 tabernacle and a dormitory, built about 1926. Both buildings are plainly detailed frame buildings with novelty weatherboard siding and poured concrete basement levels. The tabernacle measures approximately 60 feet by 80 feet and contains an auditorium designed for a capacity of 2,000 people. The dormitory is a two-story, three-bay, building with a full-width one-story porch.

The church was added to the National Register of Historic Places in 1996.
