= Downtown Salem Historic District (Salem, Virginia) =

Historic district in Virginia, United States

- U.S. National Register of Historic Places
- U.S. Historic district
- Virginia Landmarks Register
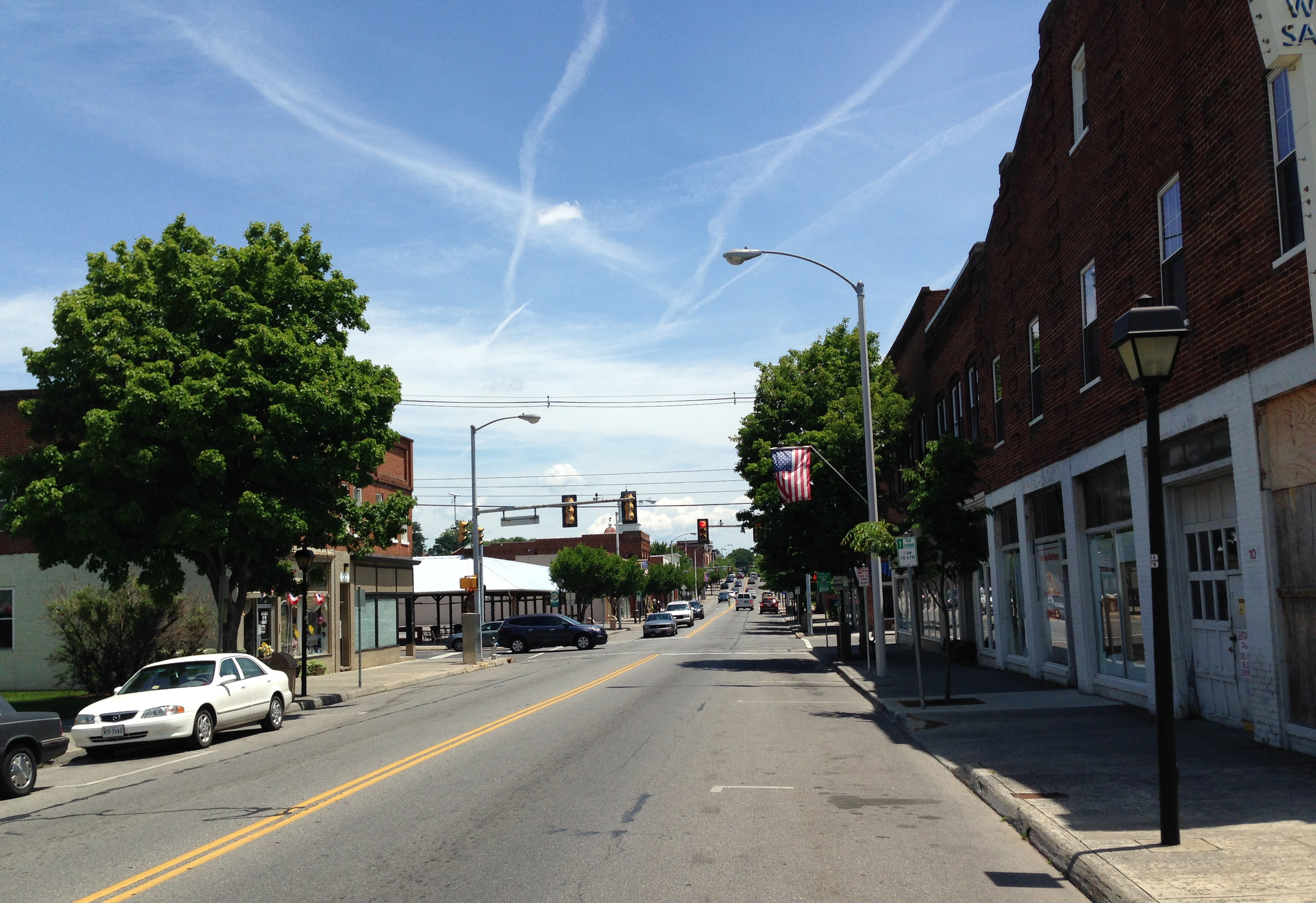
- Main Street in Salem

- Location within Virginia Location within the United States
- Location: Roughly, Main St. from Broad St. to College Ave., Salem, Virginia
- Coordinates: 37°17′36″N 80°3′24″W
- Area: 25 acres (10 ha)
- Built: 1838
- Architect: Craighill & Cardwell; Huggins, Henry Hartwell, et al.
- Architectural style: Greek Revival, Italianate, Queen Anne
- NRHP reference No.: 96000591
- VLR No.: 129-0075

Significant dates
- Added to NRHP: June 5, 1996
- Designated VLR: March 20, 1996

Downtown Salem Historic District is a national historic district located at Salem, Virginia. The district encompasses 34 contributing buildings and 1 contributing site in downtown Salem. The district includes primarily mixed-use commercial buildings, but also includes churches, dwellings, a courthouse, a post office, a library, a park, and the covered stalls of a farmer's market. The buildings mostly date from the late-19th and early-20th century and are in a variety of popular architectural styles including Greek Revival, Italianate, and Queen Anne. Notable buildings include the Stevens House or "Old Post House" (1820s-1830s), Kizer-Webber Building (1883-1886), Duval-Oakey House (1891-1898), Salem High School (former, 1911-1912), Old Salem Municipal Building and Fire Department (1925), Quality Bakery Building (c. 1903-1913), Olde Newberry Building (1929), Salem Theater (former, 1930), and James J. True Building (1927). Located in the district are the separately listed Old Roanoke County Courthouse, Salem Presbyterian Church, and Salem Post Office.

The church was added to the National Register of Historic Places in 1996.
