= Starkey, Virginia =

- Unincorporated community
- Location within the Commonwealth of Virginia Starkey, Virginia (the United States)
- Coordinates: 37°12′02″N 79°59′55″W
- Country: United States
- State: Virginia
- County: Roanoke
- Elevation: 1,138 ft (347 m)
- Time zone: UTC−5 (Eastern (EST))
  - Summer (DST): UTC−4 (EDT)
- ZIP code: 24018
- Area code: 540
- GNIS feature ID: 1495131

Starkey is an unincorporated community in southern Roanoke County, Virginia, United States. The community lies south of U.S. 221 near the Blue Ridge Parkway. This is the location of the Starkey School listed on the National Register of Historic Places.

Starkey takes its name from the land owned by Tazewell M. Starkey. "The Starkey community took its name from the Starkey family, who, along with the Harveys, Sloans and Fowlers, were among the first settlers. The village incorporated land once owned by Tazewell Starkey. In the days when Roanoke's roads were rough and muddy, Starkey was an important shipping point for apples, barrels and barrel staves, which were sent in great quantities to Winston-Salem, North Carolina."

The village had no name until the Roanoke and Southern Railroad connected with the Norfolk and Western Railroad in the early 1890s, when a railroad station was established and named for Tazewell Starkey, who gave the land for a railroad right of way. The Shenandoah Packing company was established here in 1908, and canned 11,000 cans per season of apples, tomatoes, sweet potatoes and beans. Later a Post Office was erected there, but was named "Farland" because another post office in nearby Floyd County, Virginia, also had the name "Starkey. When that name was discontinued, the name Starkey was given to this site in order to conform to the railroad station name. This was an important railroad transportation center for local farmers from Back Creek, Virginia, Cave Spring, Virginia and Bent Mountain, Virginia. Today the community is no longer distinct.
