= Belle Aire =

Historic house in Virginia, United States

- U.S. National Register of Historic Places
- Virginia Landmarks Register
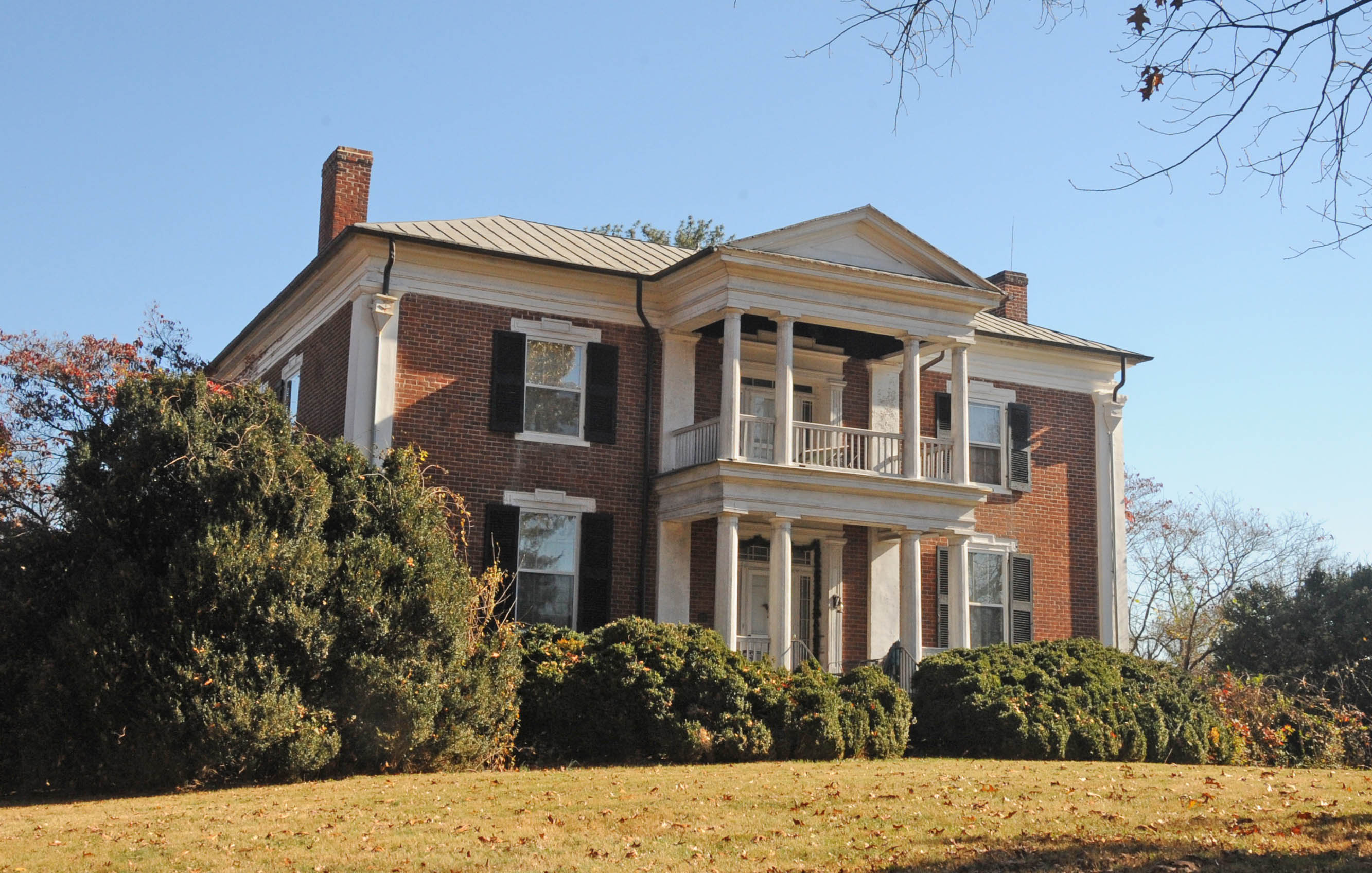
- Belle Aire built by Benjamin Deyerle in Roanoke, VA around 1849

- Location within Virginia Location within the United States
- Location: U.S. 11, Roanoke, VA
- Coordinates: 37°15′49″N 80°1′4″W
- Area: 8 acres (3.2 ha)
- Built: 1849
- Architect: Deyerle, Benjamin; Sedon, Gustavus
- Architectural style: Greek Revival
- NRHP reference No.: 75002034
- VLR No.: 128-0052

Significant dates
- Added to NRHP: April 15, 1975
- Designated VLR: October 21, 1975

Belle Aire is a Greek Revival mansion listed on both the National Register of Historic Places and the Virginia Landmarks Register in the Greater Deyerle neighborhood of the independent city of Roanoke, Virginia, U.S.A. Located just south of Brandon Avenue SW (U.S. 11) at 3820 Belle Aire Circle SW, Belle Aire was completed in 1849, as the private residence of Madison and Margeret Pitzer on a knoll overlooking their 1,600 acres (2.500 sq mi; 6.475 km^{2}) of land adjacent to the Roanoke River. It is located approximately one-half mile from his brother Jeramiah's house (Mount Airy). Today the home still stands, with the surrounding area now developed as single family home typical of those built during the 1970s-80s.

== History ==
Belle Aire was constructed by Benjamin Deyerle and his carpenter Gustave A. Sedon (also known as Gustavus Sedon) for the Pitzer family in 1849. Its Greek Revival embellishments were influenced by the New England architect Asher Benjamin's publication The Practical House Carpenter of 1830. The L-shaped home is of brick construction with stuccoed Doric pilasters at the corners. Its most recognizable feature is its 2-story pedimented portico four fluted Doric columns at each level. A kitchen addition replaced the original outbuilding and the side portico has been enclosed. Otherwise, Belle Aire remains much as it was in 1850. Today the home remains as a private residence. It became a Virginia Historic Landmark in 1966 and was listed in the National Register of Historic Places in 1975.
