= Robert Lyman Starkey =

American microbiologist (1899–1991)

Robert Lyman Starkey (September 27, 1899, in Fitchburg, Massachusetts – August 8, 1991, in Jamesburg, New Jersey) was an American microbiologist. He was the president of the American Society for Microbiology in 1963.

== Biography ==
Starkey graduated in 1921 with a B.S. from Massachusetts Agricultural College (now named the University of Massachusetts Amherst). At Rutgers University, he graduated in 1923 with an M.S. and in 1924 with a Ph.D. in microbiology. During his graduate school years, he worked from 1922 to 1924 as an assistant at the New Jersey Agricultural Experiment Station. From 1924 to 1926 he was an instructor in bacteriology at the University of Minnesota. In the department of microbiology of Rutgers University, he was an assistant professor from 1926 to 1934, an associate professor from 1934 to 1944, and a full professor from 1944 to 1965, when he retired as professor emeritus. From 1954 to 1965 he was the head of the department of agricultural microbiology. At the New Jersey Agricultural Experiment Station, he was an associate soil microbiologist from 1926 to 1944 and a research specialist from 1944 to 1965. For the academic year 1937–1938 he was a Rockefeller Foundation fellow at the Delft University of Technology.

He did research on bacterial decomposition of organic matter, nitrogen fixation, the role of sulfur, iron, carbon, nitrogen, and other elements in agricultural bacteriology, and industrial fermentation. For a number of years, he was Selman Waksman's deputy at the New Jersey Agricultural Experiment Station.

Starkey was elected in 1930 a Fellow of the American Association for the Advancement of Science. From 1941 to 1942 he was the first president of the Theobald Smith Society (the New Jersey branch of the American Society for Microbiology). In 1976 he received the Charles Thom Award from the Society for Industrial Microbiology and Biotechnology.

In 1928 he married Florence G. Tenney (1901–1997). In 1928 she received her Ph.D. in microbiology from Rutgers. In the later part of her career, she worked as a researcher on antibiotics at E. R. Squibb & Sons. She coauthored several papers with Selman Waksman.

== Selected publications ==
=== Articles ===
- Waksman, Selman A.; Starkey, Robert L. (September 1923). "Partial Sterilization of Soil Microbiological Activities and Soil Fertility: I". Soil Science. 16 (3): 137–158. Bibcode:1923SoilS..16..137W. doi:10.1097/00010694-192309000-00001. S2CID 96289808.
- Waksman, Selman A.; Starkey, Robert L. (October 1923). "Partial Sterilization of Soil, Microbiological Activities and Soil Fertility: Ii". Soil Science. 16 (4): 247–268. Bibcode:1923SoilS..16..247W. doi:10.1097/00010694-192310000-00003. S2CID 97250173. abstract
- Waksman, Selman A.; Starkey, Robert L. (November 1923). "Partial Sterilization of Soil, Microbiological Activities and Soil Fertility: III". Soil Science. 16 (5): 343–358. Bibcode:1923SoilS..16..343W. doi:10.1097/00010694-192311000-00003. abstract
- Waksman, Selman A.; Starkey, Robert L. (February 1924). "Microbiological Analysis of Soil as an Index of Soil Fertility: VII. Carbon Dioxide Evolution". Soil Science. 17 (2): 141–162. doi:10.1097/00010694-192402000-00004. S2CID 95213864.
- Starkey, Robert L. (1925). "Concerning the Carbon and Nitrogen Nutrition of Thiobacillus thiooxidans, an Autotrophic Bacterium Oxidizing Sulfur Under Acid Conditions". Journal of Bacteriology. 10 (2): 165–195. doi:10.1128/jb.10.2.165-195.1925. PMC 374838. PMID 16559139. abstract
- Starkey, Robert L. (March 1935). "Isolation of Some Bacteria Which Oxidize Thiosulfate". Soil Science. 39 (3): 197–220. Bibcode:1935SoilS..39..197S. doi:10.1097/00010694-193503000-00004. S2CID 96571215.
- Starkey, Robert L. (1934). "Cultivation of Organisms Concerned in the Oxidation of Thiosulfate". Journal of Bacteriology. 28 (4): 365–386. doi:10.1128/jb.28.4.365-386.1934. PMC 533684. PMID 16559754.
- Starkey, Robert L. (1938). "A study of spore formation and other morphological characteristics of vibrio desulfuricans". Archiv für Mikrobiologie. 9 (1–5): 268–304. doi:10.1007/BF00407364. S2CID 29962901.
- Starkey, Robert L. (1946). "Lipid Production by a Soil Yeast". Journal of Bacteriology. 51: 33–50. doi:10.1128/jb.51.1.33-50.1946. PMC 518020. PMID 21014232. S2CID 26305169.
- Starkey, Robert L. (January 1955). "Relations of Micronutrients to Development of Microorganisms". Soil Science. 79 (1): 1–14. Bibcode:1955SoilS..79....1S. doi:10.1097/00010694-195501000-00001. S2CID 98299417.
- Starkey, Robert L. (1958). "Interrelations Between Microorganisms and Plant Roots in the Rhizosphere". Bacteriological Reviews. 22 (3): 154–172. doi:10.1128/br.22.3.154-172.1958. PMC 181318. PMID 13572279.
- Segal, William; Starkey, Robert L. (1969). "Microbial Decomposition of Methionine and Identity of the Resulting Sulfur Products". Journal of Bacteriology. 98 (3): 908–913. doi:10.1128/jb.98.3.908-913.1969. PMC 315272. PMID 5788717.

=== Books ===
- Waksman, S. A.; Starkey, R. L. (1931). The Soil and the Microbe: An Introduction to the Study of the Microscopic Population of the Soil and Its Role in Soil Processes and Plant Growth. New York: John Wiley & Sons. 2021 reprint. Creative Media Partners, LLC. September 10, 2021. ISBN 9781015258839.
