= Preston House (Salem, Virginia) =

Historic house in Virginia, United States

- U.S. National Register of Historic Places
- Virginia Landmarks Register
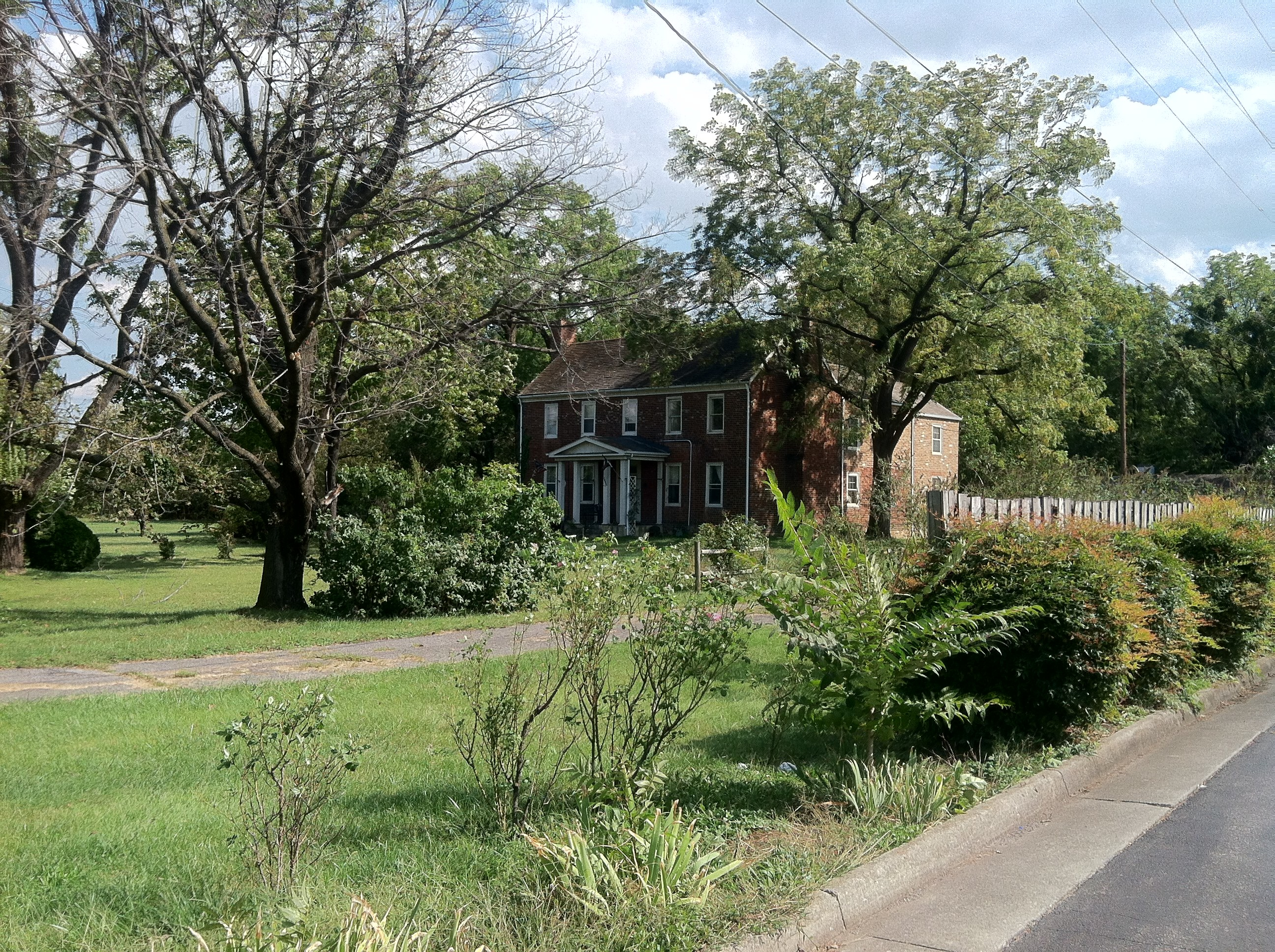
- Preston House, September 2012

- Location within Virginia Location within the United States
- Location: 1936 W. Main St., Salem, Virginia
- Coordinates: 37°17′22″N 80°5′27″W
- Area: 6.3 acres (2.5 ha)
- Built: 1821
- Architectural style: Federal
- NRHP reference No.: 05000479, 06000357 (Boundary Increase)
- VLR No.: 129-5018

Significant dates
- Added to NRHP: May 26, 2005, May 3, 2006 (Boundary Increase)
- Designated VLR: March 16, 2005, March 8, 2006 (Boundary Increase)

Preston House, also known as the John Cole House and Johns(t)on House, is a historic home located at Salem, Virginia. It was built about 1821, and is a two-story, five-bay, Federal-style brick I-house dwelling. It features a single pile, central passage plan and original rear ell, its exterior end chimneys and decorative brick cornices.

It was added to the National Register of Historic Places in 2005, with a boundary amendment in 2006.
