= Salem Post Office =

Historic post office in Virginia, US

- U.S. National Register of Historic Places
- U.S. Historic district – Contributing property
- Virginia Landmarks Register
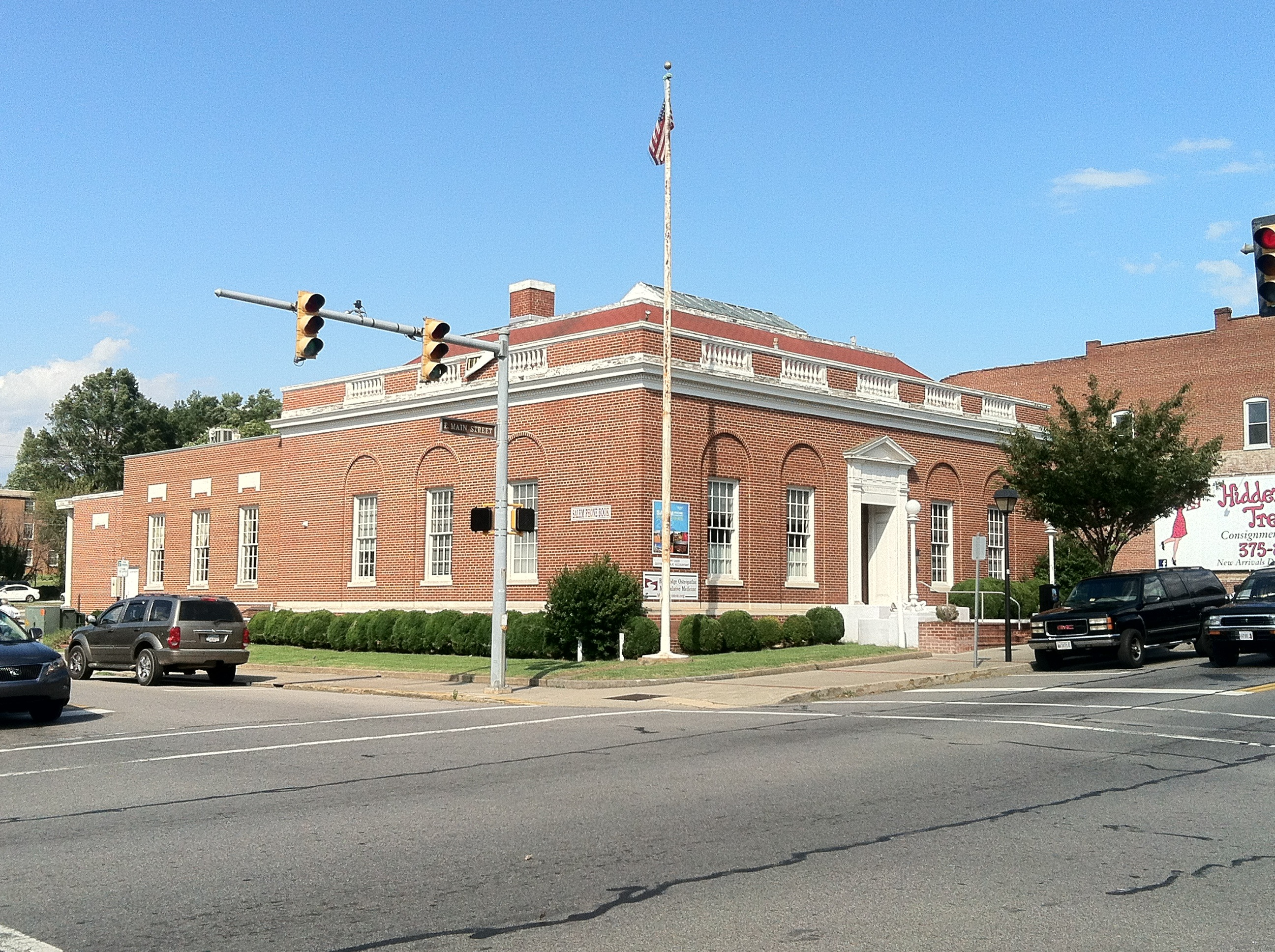
- Salem Post Office, September 2012

- Location within Virginia Location within the United States
- Location: 103 E. Main St., Salem, Virginia
- Coordinates: 37°17′35″N 80°3′24″W
- Area: 0.7 acres (0.28 ha)
- Built: 1922-1923
- Architect: Simon, Louis A.
- Architectural style: Georgian Revival
- NRHP reference No.: 92001265
- VLR No.: 129-0037

Significant dates
- Added to NRHP: September 24, 1992
- Designated VLR: April 22, 1992

Salem Post Office, also known as the Old Post Office, is a historic post office building located at Salem, Virginia.

== History ==
The Salem Post Office was built between 1922 and 1923. It is a one-story, Georgian Revival-style, brick building. It was designed by the Office of the Supervising Architect for the U.S. Treasury under the direction of Louis A. Simon. The main entrance features fluted Doric order pilasters surmounted by a Doric frieze with triglyphs and a dentilated pediment. Additions were made to the rear of the building in the 1950s, 1960s, and 1989–1991. The post office was decommissioned in 1985, and subsequently occupied by doctor's offices. In 2013, Roanoke College purchased the Old Post Office.

The building was added to the National Register of Historic Places in 1992. It is located in the Downtown Salem Historic District.
