= McVitty Home =

Historic building in Salem, Virginia, US

- McVitty House
- U.S. National Register of Historic Places
- Virginia Landmarks Register
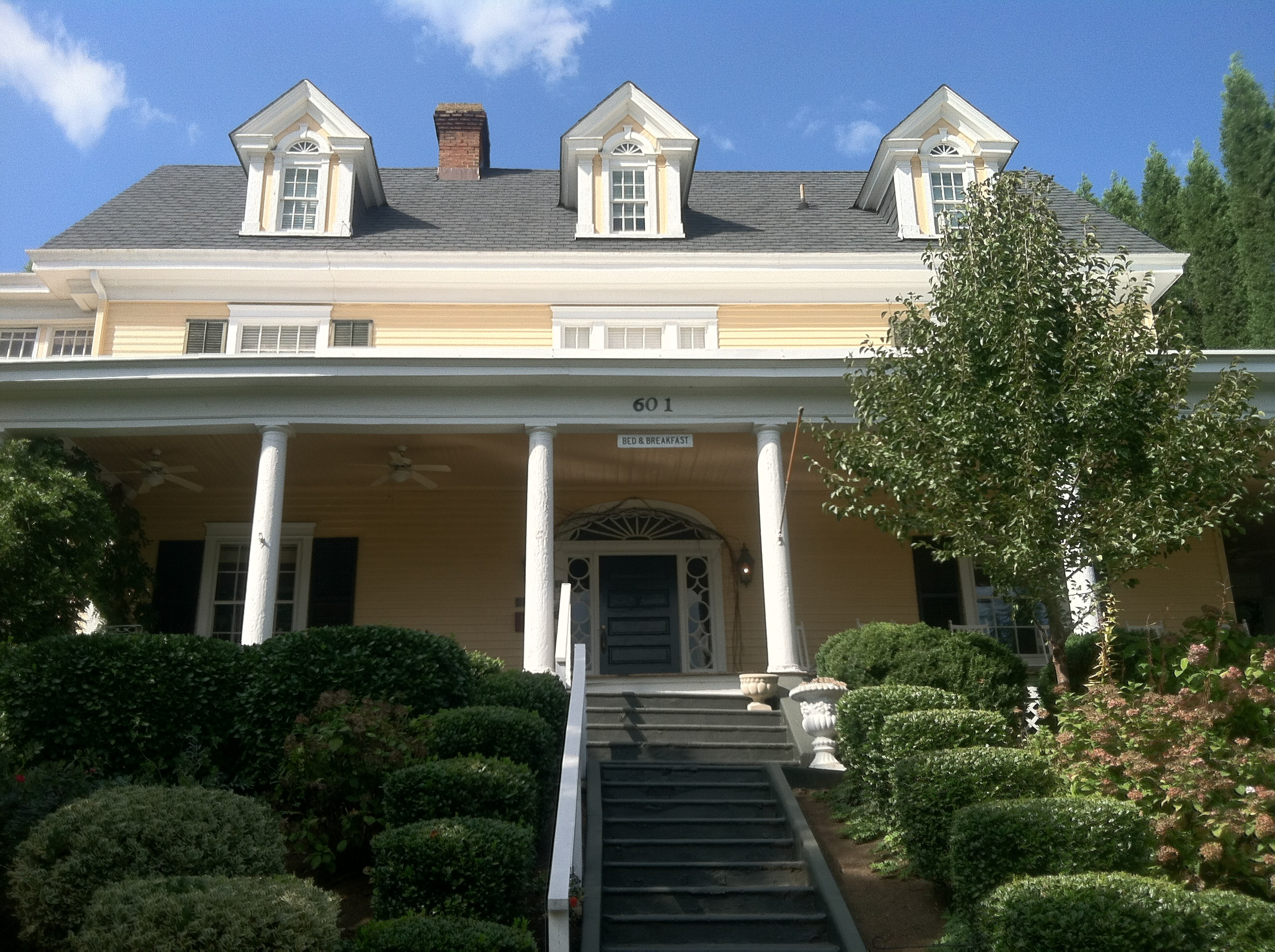
- McVitty House, September 2012

- Location within Virginia Location within the United States
- Location: 601 W. Main St., Salem, Virginia
- Coordinates: 37°17′30″N 80°4′4″W
- Area: 0.5 acres (0.20 ha)
- Built: 1906
- Architectural style: Colonial Revival
- NRHP reference No.: 03001092
- VLR No.: 129-0066

Significant dates
- Added to NRHP: October 23, 2003
- Designated VLR: June 18, 2003

McVitty House, also known as the Inn at Burwell Place, is a historic home located at Salem, Virginia. It was built in 1906 and expanded with a substantial addition in 1925. It is a 2 1/2-story, L-shaped, Colonial Revival style frame dwelling. It features a full-length wrap-around porch with Tuscan columns, elaborate dormers, stunning fanlight windows and an attached sun/sleeping porch. The house is operated as a bed and breakfast.

It was added to the National Register of Historic Places in 2003.
