= Benjamin Deyerle =

19th century architect and brickmaker in Virginia

Benjamin Deyerle (1806–1883) was an architect, artist and brickmaker in Roanoke County, Virginia. Many of the historic homes, churches and public buildings in Roanoke were designed and built under his and his family's direction. He is credited with building 23 of them, and perhaps more. Some of these homes and buildings are currently listed on both the National Register of Historic Places and the Virginia Landmarks Register.

== Early life ==
Benjamin Deyerle was born on September 7, 1806, to Charles and Elizabeth Leffler Deyerle. Charles was the son of Peter Deyerle who was a German immigrant and indentured servant when he first came to America in 1748, and later became a wealthy landowner in Montgomery County, Virginia. Peter Deyerle (1732–1812) supported the American Revolution and fought alongside Daniel Boone at the Battle of Blue Licks in Kentucky. He was also a county surveyor and overseer of roads from 1773 to 1786. Charles Deyerle was a miller, and when he died in 1815, his land and holdings were valued at $584.75.

Benjamin had a half-brother, Joseph, and a nephew, James C. Deyerle (1825–1897), who were also masons and builders. His brother, David (1813–1898) is credited with the brickwork of the Peters Creek Church of the Brethren, the 1861 Main Building at Hollins University, and the 1861 brick addition to his own home. Most of the buildings constructed by the Deyerle family were Greek Revival in style. James C. Deyerle is also credited with the construction of the Spring Dale (Dublin, Virginia).

Benjamin married Julia Ann Shaver Deyerle (1816–1895), and their children were: Susan Catherine Deyerle Chapman (1835–1884), George W Deyerle (1840–1862); Mary Jane Deyerle McCluer (1845–1870); Henry Shaver Deyerle (1847–1923) and Bessie Deyerle Wooding (1855–1937).

Benjamin Deyerle, the grandson of German immigrant Peter Deyerle, was a large-scale farmer with tracts of land in Roanoke County (specifically the Greater Deyerle neighborhood) and Franklin County, Virginia where he raised wheat, corn, tobacco, and cattle. He also operated a prosperous mill, a general store, and a large whiskey distillery.

Benjamin Deyerle purchased one slave, Charles Lewis, to help with the brick making and construction. Charles Lewis had learned brick making in eastern Virginia, and was purchased in Richmond, Virginia, about 1849. By 1850 Benjamin had 13 slaves. including 7 males ranging in age from 16 to 52. By 1860 he owned 34 slaves, of whom 23 were male. At Lone Oaks he had 3 slave cabins. His brother, David, owned 7 male slaves ranging in age from 8 to 28, and his nephew had 5 males ranging in age from 16 to 35 years old. Joseph had 25 slaves and built 5 slave houses at Pleasant Grove (Salem, Virginia) in 1860. In 1934, Peyton M. Lewis, a former slave who had belonged to Benjamin Deyerle, engaged in a series of correspondence with some Deyerle descendants in Roanoke. He wrote that his father. Charles Lewis, was a "great brick molder and layer, and a great distiller of whiskey." He also stated that Charles Lewis and his brother, Peyton Lewis (Peyton M. Lewis's uncle and namesake), were bought off the auction block in Richmond by Joseph and Benjamin Deyerle. Benjamin retained Charles, and Joseph retained Peyton. This would have occurred sometime between 1834 and 1849; therefore, it is likely that Peyton Lewis was one of the slaves who helped build Roanoke College, Pleasant Grove (Salem, Virginia), and possibly other structures.

Benjamin Deyerle also worked closely with Gustave A. Sedon, a German carpenter and cabinet maker.

== Brickmaking ==
The bricks made by Benjamin Deyerle and Charles Lewis are often considered to be the best in the region. For mid-19th century America, the bricks were of a uniformly hard durability, and fired to a nice red or brown color. The Deyerles used Flemish bond bricks in most of the Greek Revival homes, and used an all-stretcher bond (Stretcher bond) on some of the churches and upscale homes for a more uniform appearance. Collections of discarded bricks and poorly fired bricks were also used for constructing outbuildings, wall interiors, and other purposes. Some of the bricks were autographed, such as one dated "1852" and found on a wall on Pleasant Grove Plantation.

== Historic buildings ==
=== Churches ===
Although the Christiansburg Presbyterian Church was built by James E. Crush and the brothers Samuel M. Hickok and James W. Hickok from Fincastle, Virginia and was completed in 1853, a number of the Greek Revival churches had much the same architecture. As the Deyerle family cooperated and assisted each other in building construction, they also obviously worked with other builders at the time. They thus learned and copied from each other, as they learned and copied from the architecture handbooks of the time.

==== Cave Spring Methodist Church ====
Benjamin Deyerle constructed the Cave Spring Methodist Church about 1854 in the Greek Revival style. It was a one-story, Nave-plan church typical of the period. It had a separate balcony or gallery for slaves to attend services. There was a rear fireplace in the building which was re-discovered in 1946 during renovations. Part of the fireplace had to be removed to install a new staircase. According to legend, there is a cornerstone that contains a Bible and information about the church and the builders, but this has never been discovered. The church has subsequently served the Roanoke Valley Unitarian Church and a day care facility.

"A second Methodist congregation was formed in the Cave Spring area, where Methodists, Lutherans, and Presbyterians worshipped in a union church built in 1845. In 1853, this church was deeded to the Methodists."

==== Fairmont Baptist Church ====
The Fairmont Baptist Church is located about six miles southwest of Boones Mill, Virginia, and constructed between 1855 and 1857. It has two front entrances with panel doors. and three windows with heavy wooden lintels on each side. The church is about four miles from Evergreen (Rocky Mount, Virginia), where Benjamin Deyerle owned the farm but did not live there. However, his slaves made the bricks and mortar to enlarge the house and outbuildings between the 1850s and 1860s. The bricks at Evergreen are identical to those used in the Fairmont Baptist Church.

==== Piedmont Presbyterian Church ====
The Piedmont Presbyterian Church in Callaway, Virginia is reported to be the first Presbyterian church erected in the county of Franklin County, Virginia. Constructed by Benjamin Deyerle about 1850, the Flemish bond Greek Revival church, has two front entrances, shuttered windows and a pedimented front gable. Reportedly, Benjamin Deyerle's slaves made the bricks on the nearby William Callaway farm and then laid the bricks for the church building.

==== Salem Presbyterian Church ====
He probably built the Salem Presbyterian Church (Salem, Virginia).

=== Roanoke College ===
The Deyerle brothers, Joseph and Benjamin Deyerle, built two of the earliest buildings on Roanoke College's campus in Salem, Virginia. The Administration Building and Monterey House were definitely built by the brothers. The designers of some of the other historic buildings are unknown, but may have also included members of the Deyerle family.

The college main building was made by James C. and Joseph Deyerle, and is built in Flemish bond, in Greek Revival style on the north end of College Street. "Flanking wings, set back about two feet from the central facade, were added in the 1850s by local contractor, G. B. Fitzgerald. In 1903 the college added a third floor to the building, and a monumental portico with elaborate Classical Revival architecture details."

=== Houses ===
==== Belle Aire ====
Belle Aire was constructed by Benjamin Deyerle and his carpenter Gustave A. Sedon (also known as Gustavus Sedon) for the Pitzer family in 1849. Its Greek Revival embellishments were influenced by the New England architect Asher Benjamin's publication The Practical House Carpenter of 1830. The L-shaped home is of brick construction with stuccoed Doric pilasters at the corners. Its most recognizable feature is its 2-story pedimented portico four fluted Doric columns at each level. A kitchen addition replaced the original outbuilding and the side portico has been enclosed. Otherwise, Belle Aire remains much as it was in 1850. As of 2023 the home is used as a private residence. It became a Virginia Historic Landmark in 1966 and was listed in the National Register of Historic Places in 1975.

==== Evergreen (Rocky Mount, Virginia) ====
Benjamin Deyerle also built Evergreen (Rocky Mount, Virginia) in Franklin County, Virginia. In this house the Italianate style was added to the Greek Revival. The house, also known as the "Callaway-Deyerle House", was originally completed in 1861. William Callaway was the son of Colonel James Callaway, and he gave the land to his grandson. Here Benjamin Deyerle had his distillery and a farm of some 4,500 acres.

==== Hunter's Rest ====
James Persinger (1808–1884) lived in a log house in the rear of the Persinger house, until about 1854 when he commissioned Benjamin Deyerle, "the most popular builder in the county", to erect the brick dwelling, originally called "Hunter's Rest, now known as "White's Corners", at 1606 Persinger Road in Roanoke.

==== Keagy House ====
The house built in 1857 for Benjamin Keagy was two stories, L-shaped house with a shallow pitched gable roof in the Italianate style. There were fireplaces in each room, including the raised basement. Off to the side was a one and a half story brick outbuilding that served as a kitchen and slave quarter. Charles Lewis also worked in making the bricks and building this home. The house was completely bulldozed in 1989.

==== Lone Oaks ====
Benjamin Deyerle also built Lone Oaks. The original name from 1840 was "Lone Oaks", but had been changed to "Lone Oaks" at a later time, then renamed "Winsmere" after John Ferguson acquired the property in 1938.

==== David Trout House ====
Benjamin Deyerle built the house for David Trout, also called "Cherry Hill", in 1857. It was demolished in the 1980s. The house was a two-story single pile, L-shaped brick house similar to other Deyerle family constructions, and may have served as a model for other homes built by David and J.C. Deyerle.

==== Walnut Grove ====
Walnut Grove was the home of Christian Nininger, a Brethren preacher and merchant, and was built around 1866. This residence may have been built by David Deyerle, or perhaps with his brother, Benjamin. Completed 1866–1867, the bricks are laid in Flemish bond in front. Originally known as "Walnut Grove", the house was subsequently known as "Meadowbrook". It is two stories high, double pile structure with brick foundation, hipped roof, three-bay facade, and two-story rear ell.

== Death ==
Benjamin Deyerle died on May 5, 1883.

== Bibliography ==
- Barnes, Raymond P., and Betty B. Low. A History of Roanoke. [Roanoke, Va.]: [Historical Society of Western Virginia], 2008.
- Cheek, Elizabeth. 1971. Benjamin Deyerle, Builder, 1806–1883. Hollins University Thesis.
- Cheek, Elizabeth. 1972. "Benjamin Deyerle, Builder of Fine Homes." Journal of the Roanoke Historical Society. Summer, 1972.
- Prillaman, Helen R. A Place Apart: A Brief History of the Early Williamson Road and North Roanoke Valley Residents and Places. Baltimore, Md: Reprinted for Clearfield Co. by Genealogical Pub. Co, 2007.
- Pulice, Michael J. 2003. "The Legend of Benjamin Deyerle, Revisited". Journal of the History Museum and Historical Society of Western Virginia. 15, no. 2: 4–17.
- Pulice, Michael J. Nineteenth-Century Brick Architecture in the Roanoke Valley and Beyond: Discovering the True Legacies of the Deyerle Builders. Roanoke, Va: Historical Society of Western Virginia, 2011.
- Pulice, Michael J. 2005. "Unraveling the Benjamin Deyerle Legend: An Analysis of Mid-Nineteenth-Century Brickwork in the Roanoke Valley of Virginia". Perspectives in Vernacular Architecture. 12: 32–48.
