= Salem Presbyterian Parsonage =

Historic house in Virginia, United States

- U.S. National Register of Historic Places
- Virginia Landmarks Register
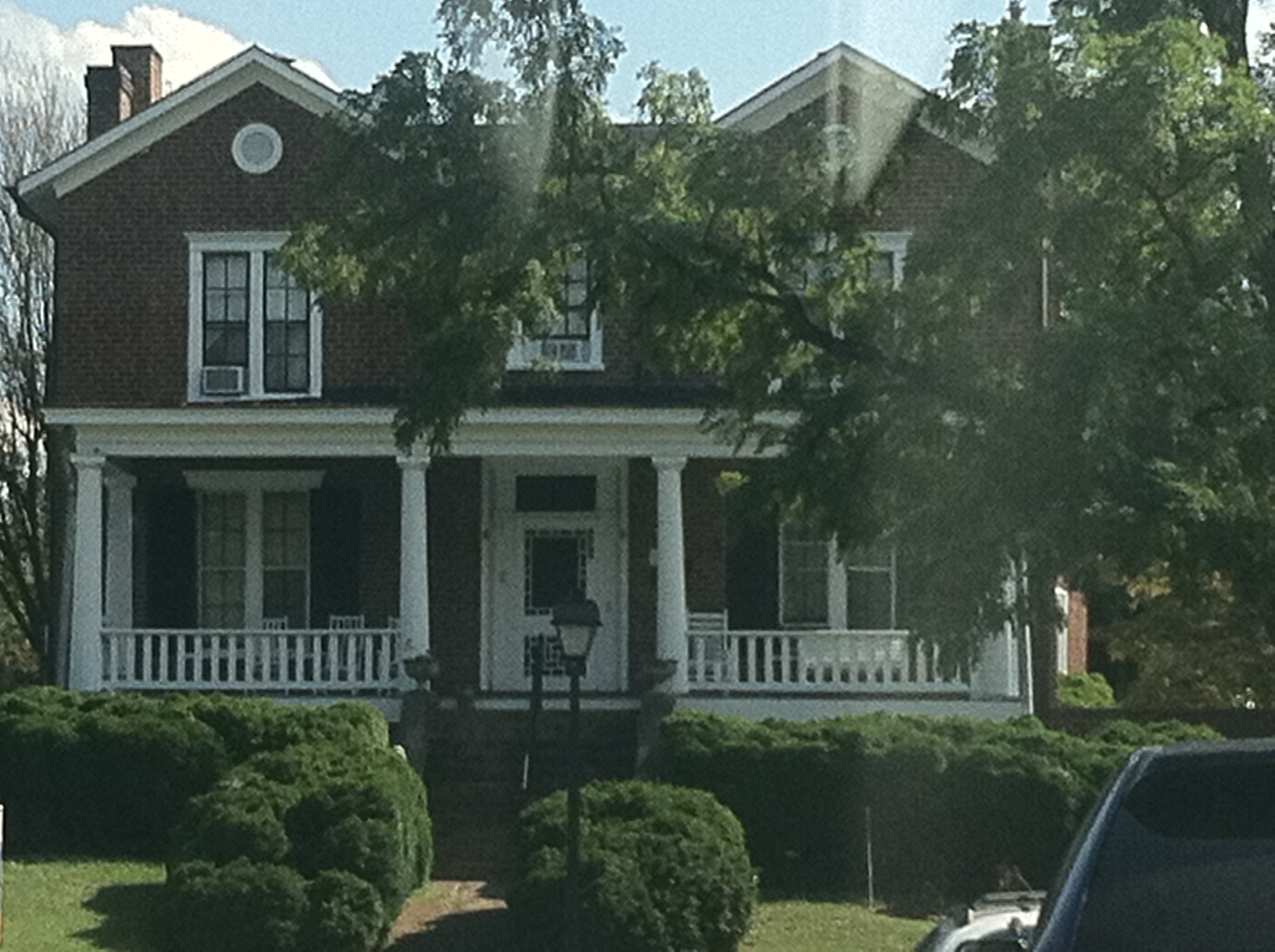
- Salem Presbyterian Parsonage, September 2012

- Location within Virginia Location within the United States
- Location: 530 E. Main St., Salem, Virginia
- Coordinates: 37°17′36″N 80°3′6″W
- Area: 0.5 acres (0.20 ha)
- Built: 1847, 1879, 1896-1909, 1922
- Architectural style: Greek Revival
- NRHP reference No.: 91002017
- VLR No.: 129-0014

Significant dates
- Added to NRHP: January 28, 1992
- Designated VLR: August 21, 1991

Salem Presbyterian Parsonage, also known as the Old Manse, is a historic parsonage associated with Salem Presbyterian Church and located at Salem, Virginia. The core section was built in 1847, and is a two-story, central passage plan, brick I-house. A front section was added to the core in 1879, giving the house an L-shaped configuration; an addition in 1922 filled in the "L". A dining room addition built between 1896 and 1909 connected the main house to a formerly detached kitchen dating to the 1850s. The house features Greek Revival style exterior and interior detailing. The front facade features a one-story porch with a hipped roof supported by fluted Doric order columns. The Salem Presbyterian Church acquired the house in 1854; they sold the property in 1941.

It was added to the National Register of Historic Places in 1992.
