= Starkey School =

Historic school building in Virginia, US

- U.S. National Register of Historic Places
- Virginia Landmarks Register
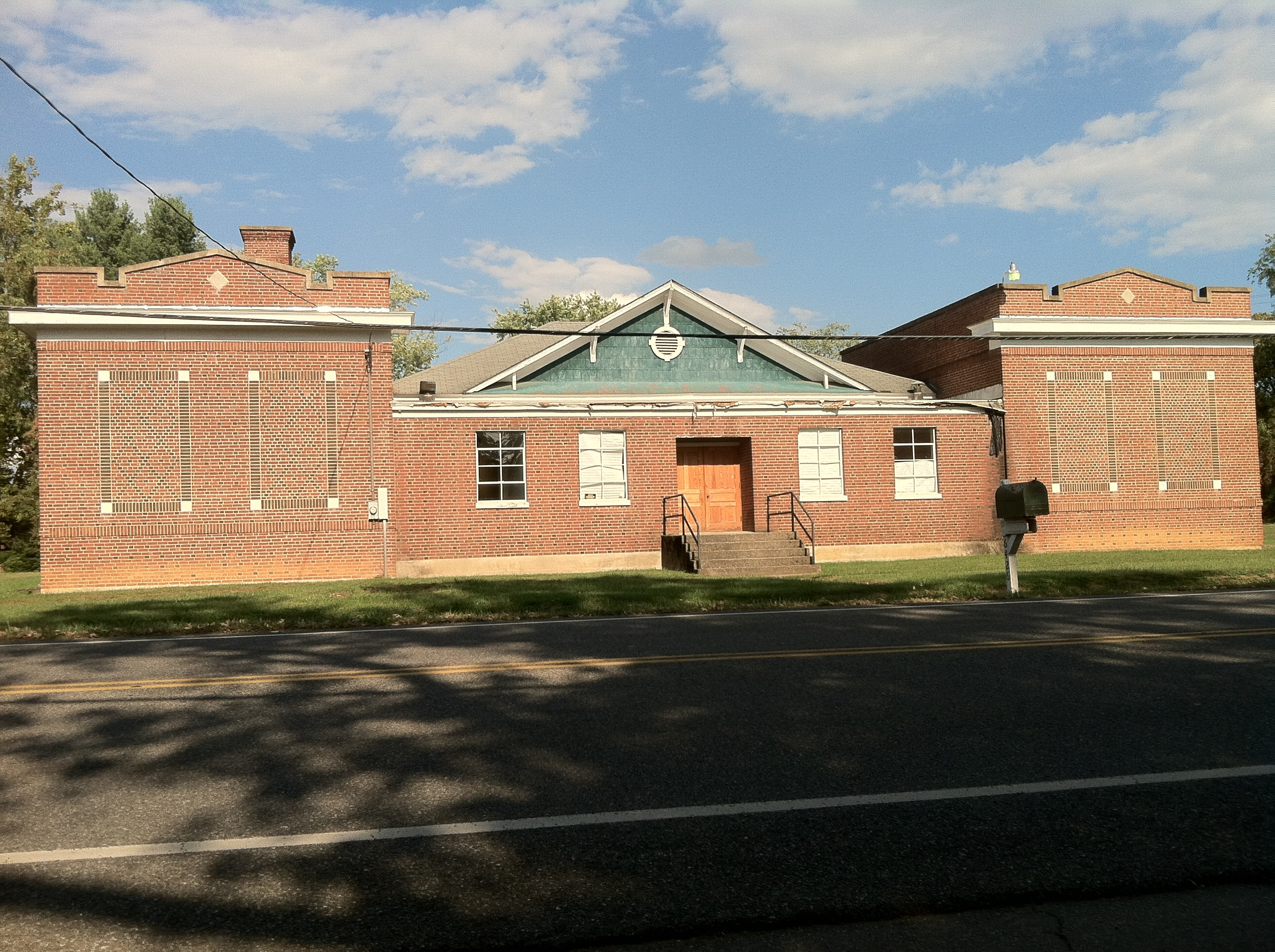
- Starkey School, September 2012

- Location within Virginia Location within the United States
- Location: 6426 Merriman Rd., SW, Starkey, Virginia
- Coordinates: 37°12′7″N 79°59′57″W
- Area: 0.8 acres (0.32 ha)
- Built: c. 1894, c. 1915, 1928
- NRHP reference No.: 01001513
- VLR No.: 080-0348

Significant dates
- Added to NRHP: January 24, 2002
- Designated VLR: June 13, 2001

Starkey School is a historic school building located at Starkey, Roanoke County, Virginia. It was built about 1915, and is thought to incorporate an earlier one-room school built about 1894. It is a brick school building flanked by wings built in 1928, and measuring 24 feet by 33 feet. In December 1962, the school was closed and was purchased by Roanoke County. The school is now privately owned.

The school was named for the district, and is built upon land once owned by Tazewell M. Starkey. Tazewell Starkey was an influential landowner and farmer in the district, and two roads that intersect at Starkey school are named for his family: Starkey Street and Merriman Road. He was a member of the Roanoke County School Board, Cave Springs District, from 1873 to 1895.

In 1941–1942, Starkey school taught children of the area from first through 6th grade. Crispean Divers was the school principal and taught the combined fifth and sixth grades. Martha T. Flora taught the combined 3rd and fourth grades, while Lillian S. Woodford taught the first and second grades.

It was added to the National Register of Historic Places in 2002.
