= Old Roanoke County Courthouse =

- U.S. National Register of Historic Places
- U.S. Historic district – Contributing property
- Virginia Landmarks Register
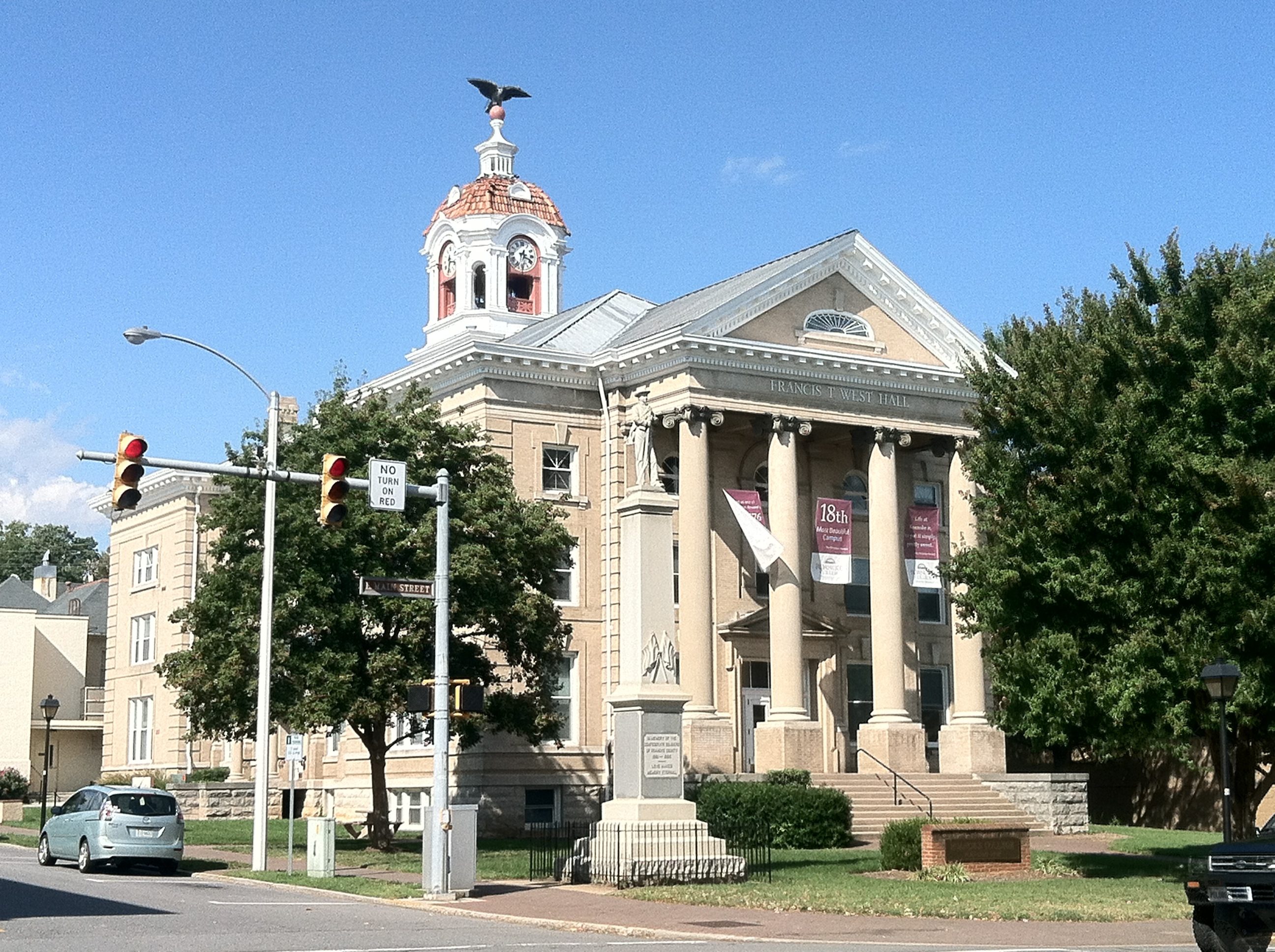
- Old Roanoke County Courthouse, September 2012

- Location within Virginia Location within the United States
- Location: 301 E. Main St., Salem, Virginia
- Coordinates: 37°17′37″N 80°3′17″W
- Area: 0.5 acres (0.20 ha)
- Built: 1909-1910
- Architect: Huggins, H. H.
- Architectural style: Classical Revival
- NRHP reference No.: 87000727
- VLR No.: 129-0008

Significant dates
- Added to NRHP: May 14, 1987
- Designated VLR: March 17, 1987

Old Roanoke County Courthouse is a historic courthouse building located in Salem, Virginia. It was built in 1909-1910 and is a three-story, Classical Revival-style, yellow brick building. The front façade features a three-story, tetra-style Ionic order portico. The courthouse has a hipped roof topped by a cupola, which is topped by an eagle. A rear addition was built in 1948–1949. The building housed Roanoke County, Virginia county offices until they moved to a new building in 1985.

The building was added to the National Register of Historic Places in 1987. It is located in the Downtown Salem Historic District. Today the property is owned by Roanoke College after buying most of the property in 1987. Next to the courthouse is a controversial 1910 Civil War Memorial, which consists of a granite shaft topped by the figure of a Confederate soldier. Although appearing to be on the same property as the courthouse, the Confederate monument is not owned by Roanoke College. As part of the sale, Roanoke County retained the deed to this separate plot of land. Although there has been pressure from various groups to remove the Confederate monument, including an official removal order from a local circuit court judge, the statute remains standing as recently as March 2024.
