= Academy Street School =

Historic building complex in Virginia, US

- U.S. National Register of Historic Places
- Virginia Landmarks Register
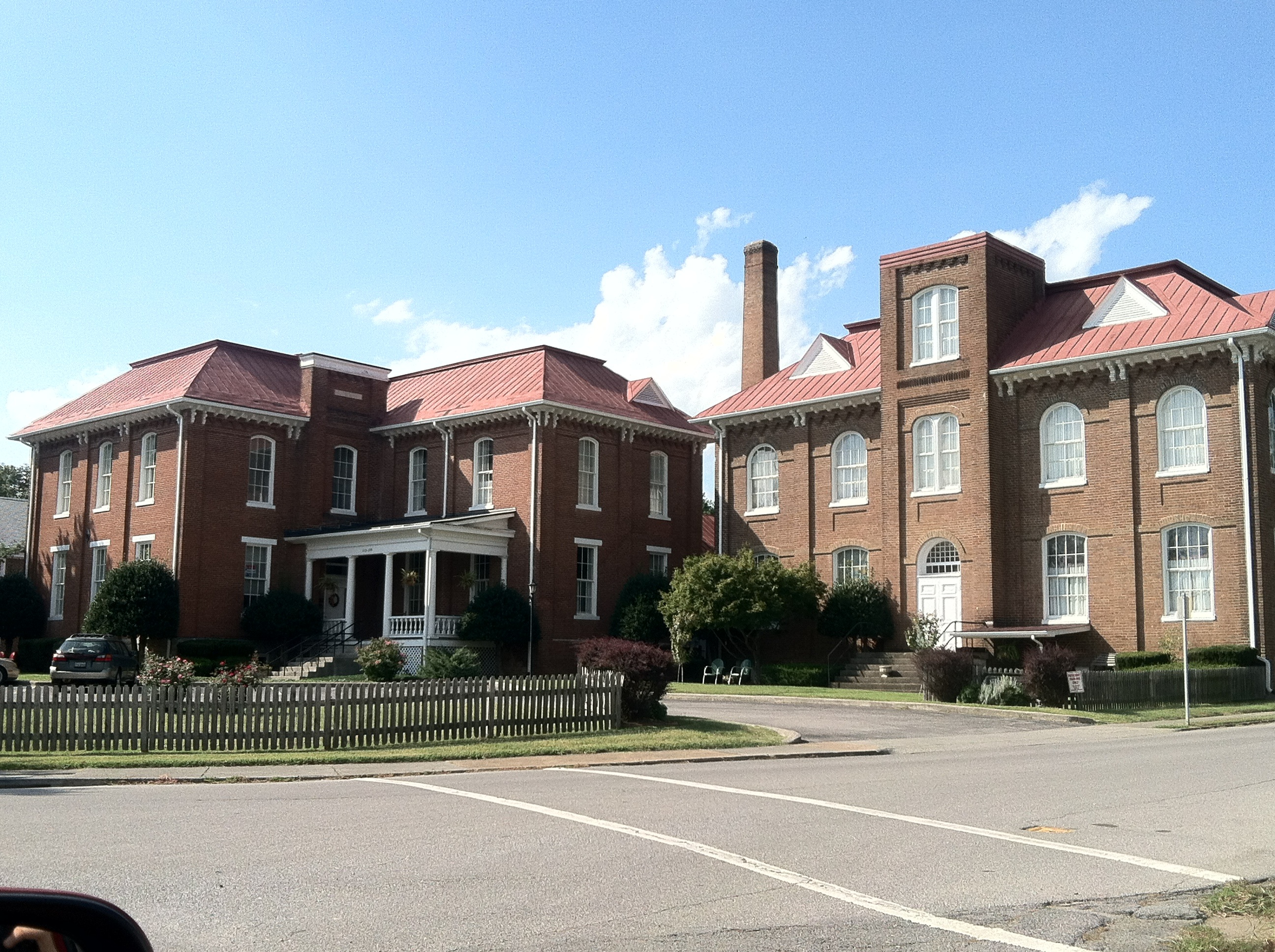
- Academy Street School.jpg, September 2012

- Location within Virginia Location within the United States
- Location: Academy St., Salem, Virginia
- Coordinates: 37°17′37″N 80°3′41″W
- Area: 1.3 acres (0.53 ha)
- Built: 1890, c. 1903
- NRHP reference No.: 81000648
- VLR No.: 129-0002

Significant dates
- Added to NRHP: October 1, 1981
- Designated VLR: January 20, 1981

Academy Street School is a historic school complex located at Salem, Virginia. The complex consists of two buildings; the first built in 1890 and the annex about 1903. They are connected by a hyphen. The 1890 building is a two-story, three-bay, brick building with a projecting three-story tower and hipped roof. The 1903 annex building is a two-story, L-shaped brick building with a hipped roof and one-story frame porch.

The church was added to the National Register of Historic Places in 1981.
