= List of Roanoke College alumni =

Roanoke College is a private liberal arts college in Salem, Virginia. Following are some of its notable alumni.

== Art and architecture ==
- Rob Balder – cartoonist
- Joel Christian Gill – cartoonist and author of graphic novels
- Wyatt C. Hedrick – architect, engineer, and developer

== Business ==
- John P. Fishwick – former president of Norfolk and Western Railway
- John McAfee – software entrepreneur; founder of McAfee
- John A. Mulheren – Wall Street trader and philanthropist; provided funding for the construction of several Roanoke College buildings
- Stuart T. Saunders – founding chairman, Penn Central Railroad; appeared on the cover of Time in 1968

== Education ==
- R. H. W. Dillard – poet and author; and professor of English and creative writing at Hollins University
- Thomas David Gordon – reformed theologian, writer, and professor at Grove City College
- Cornelius T. Jordan – Virginia Senate and president of New Mexico College of Agriculture and Mechanic Arts (New Mexico State University)
- Lewis Lancaster – Buddhist scholar; professor emeritus, University of California, Berkeley; past president, University of the West
- William Riley Parker – professor of English at Indiana University and New York University
- Rebecca Sharitz – ecologist and emeritus professor at the University of Georgia
- Carol M. Swain – Pulitzer Prize nominee in 2002, political scientist, and professor at Vanderbilt University

== Entertainment ==
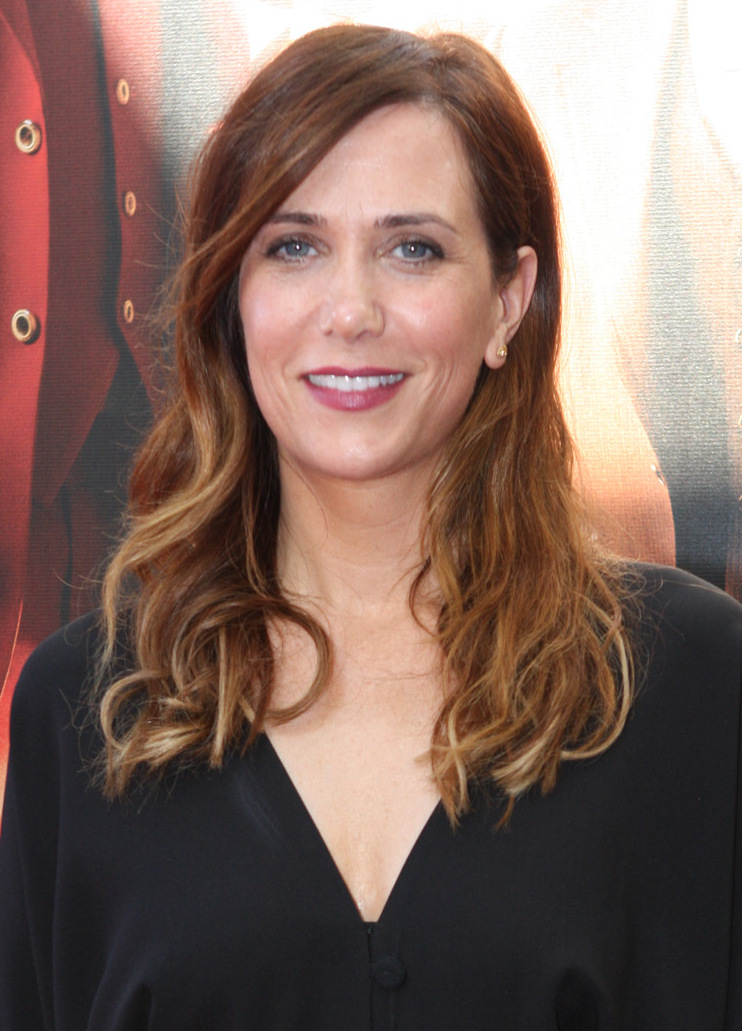
Kristen Wiig

- Jay Alaimo – film director, writer, and producer
- Ted Brown – radio personality in New York City with WMGM, WNEW and WNBC
- Omari K. Chancellor – film, television, and stage actor
- Walter Compton – radio and television broadcaster and executive
- Tom T. Hall – country music artist, attended Roanoke following military service via the G.I. Bill
- John Payne – film and television actor
- David C. Robinson – movie producer and vice president of Morgan Creek Productions
- Alice White – film actress
- Eve Whittle – actress and child psychologist
- Kristen Wiig – actress known for Saturday Night Live and various comedic blockbusters

== Law ==
- George Warwick McClintic – judge with the United States District Court for the Southern District of West Virginia 1921–42
- Richard Harding Poff – justice with the Supreme Court of Virginia 1972–88 and United States representative 1953–72
- Anthony D. Sayre – justice with the Supreme Court of Alabama 1909–31
- Frank S. Tavenner Jr. – United States attorney, United States District Court for the Western District of Virginia, 1940–45
- James C. Turk – judge with the United States District Court for the Western District of Virginia 1972–2014 and Virginia Senate

== Literature and journalism ==
- R. H. W. Dillard – poet and author; and professor of English and creative writing at Hollins University
- Rorer A. James – owner and editor of the Danville Register and the Danville Bee, Virginia House, Senate, and United States representative
- Frederick Bittle Kegley – magazine editor and author
- Ruth Randall – biographer of Mary Todd Lincoln
- William Seabrook – journalist, author, explorer and occultist; best known for introducing the Haitian Vodou concept of zombies into popular culture with his book, The Magic Island (1929)

== Military ==
- Leslie D. Carter – U.S. Army major general
- David C. Shanks – US Army major general
- Yi Kang – lieutenant general in Imperial Korean Army and Korean prince

== Politics ==
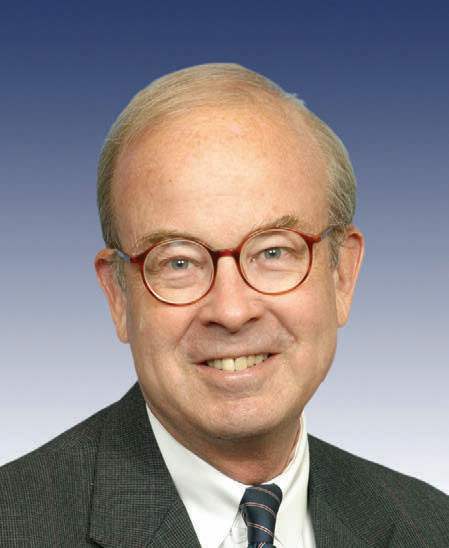
Frederick C. Boucher

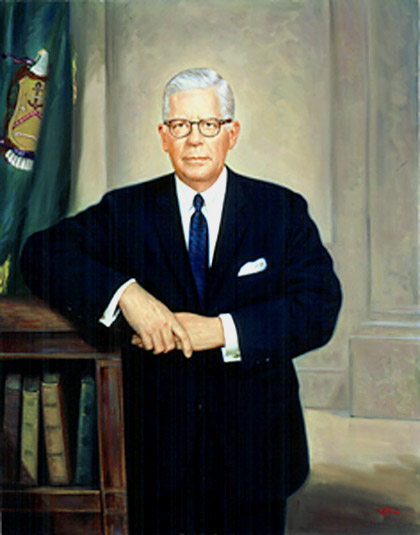
Henry H. Fowler

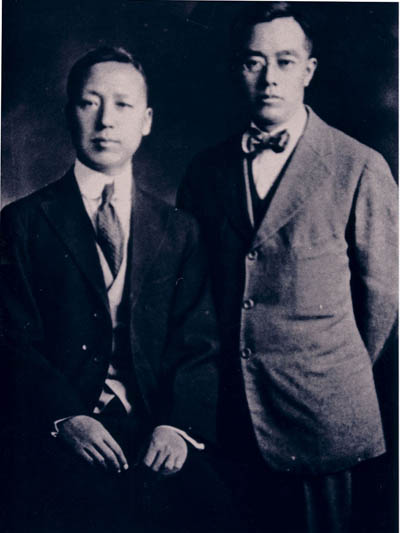
Kim Kyu-Sik, Provisional Government of the Republic of Korea

- Frederick C. Boucher – United States representative, Virginia's 9th congressional district, 1983–2011
- Park Hee Byung – Korean independence leader; worked to end the Japanese annexation of Korea
- Christy Underwood Clark – North Carolina House of Representatives
- Walter M. Denny – United States representative, Mississippi's 6th congressional district, 1895–97
- Mawine G. Diggs – Liberian minister of Commerce and Industry
- Henry H. Fowler – United States Treasury Secretary, 1965–68
- Rorer A. James – Virginia House, Senate, United States representative, owner and editor of the Danville Register and the Danville Bee
- Cornelius T. Jordan – Virginia Senate and president of New Mexico College of Agriculture and Mechanic Arts (New Mexico State University)
- Kim Kyu-shik – Korean independence leader; represented Korea at the Paris Peace Conference at the end of World War I
- James W. Marshall – United States representative, Virginia's 9th congressional district, 1893–95
- William McKendree Murrell – member of the Virginia House of Delegates
- Leonard G. Muse – Virginia Senate
- Park Hee-byung – Korean independence activist
- E. J. Pipkin – member, Maryland State Senate, 2003–13
- Richard H. Poff – United States representative 1953–72; justice, Supreme Court of Virginia, 1972–88
- Sam Rasoul – member, Virginia House of Delegates
- Lloyd M. Robinette – Virginia Senate
- Robert Spellane – member, Massachusetts House of Representatives, 2001–11
- James C. Turk – Virginia Senate and judge with the United States District Court for the Western District of Virginia, 1972–2014
- James P. Woods – United States representative, Virginia's 6th congressional district, 1918–23
- Joshua Soule Zimmerman – West Virginia House of Delegates

== Religion ==
- William A. Brown – Episcopal bishop of Southern Virginia
- Thomas C. Darst – bishop of the Episcopal Diocese of East Carolina
- W. A. R. Goodwin – Episcopal priest, historian, and author known as the "father of Colonial Williamsburg"
- Arthur Selden Lloyd – coadjutor bishop for the Episcopal Diocese of Virginia and suffragan bishop of New York
- Richard L. Pratt Jr. – theologian, author, and founder and president of Third Millennium Ministries
- William Henry Roberts – Baptist minister who worked for many years as a missionary in Burma
- Theodore Schneider – bishop of the Metropolitan Washington, D.C. Synod, Evangelical Lutheran Church in America, 1995–2007

== Science and medicine ==
- William Steel Creighton – myrmecologist and taxonomist with Department of Biology at the City College of New York
- Alan M. Friedlander – marine biologist and fisheries scientist
- Carl W. Gottschalk – professor of medicine, University of North Carolina; notable kidney researcher
- Bettie Sue Masters – biochemist and adjunct professor at Duke University
- Vernon Benjamin Mountcastle – neurophysiologist and Professor Emeritus of Neuroscience at Johns Hopkins University

== Sports ==
- Frankie Allen – college basketball player and coach
- Doc Ayers – professional baseball player
- William Beroza – lacrosse goalie, coach and member of the National Lacrosse Hall of Fame
- Jim Brillheart – professional baseball player
- Lombe Honaker – college football coach
- Loren LaPorte – college softball coach
- Mike McGuire – head coach of the Radford University women's basketball team
- Herbert J. McIntire – college football coach
- Rock Norman – college basketball and track coach
- Shelley Olds – former professional racing cyclist
- John Pirro –- lacrosse player and coach
- Ben Sanders – professional baseball player
- Conley Snidow – college football and basketball coach
- Gordon C. White – college football coach
