= Kegley =

Kegley may refer to:

== Places ==
- Kegley, Illinois, unincorporated community in Franklin County, Illinois, United States
- Kegley, West Virginia, unincorporated community in Mercer County, West Virginia, United States

== People with the surname ==
- Corinne Elaine Kegley, pseudonym briefly used by Corinne Cole (born 1937), American model and actress
- Frederick Bittle Kegley (1877–1968), Virginia local historian, agricultural leader and educator
- Lindsay Moran Kegley (born 1969), former clandestine officer for the Central Intelligence Agency
- R. K. Kegley (1828–1903), American politician in the state of Washington

== See also ==
- Marshall and Kegley, United States architectural firm based in Chicago from 1905 to 1926
- Keighley
- Keightley
