= Philip Rabinowitz =

Philip Rabinowitz may refer to:

- Philip Rabinowitz (mathematician) (1926–2006), applied mathematician
- Philip Rabinowitz (runner) (1904–2008), Lithuanian-born South African world record holder as the fastest centenarian
