= Gustav A. Hedlund =

American mathematician (1904–1993)

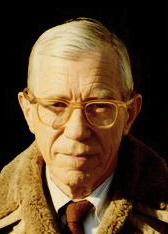
- Gustav Hedlund, 1969
- Born: May 7, 1904; Somerville, Massachusetts, US
- Died: March 15, 1993 (aged 88)
- Education: Columbia University; Harvard University
- Scientific career
- Fields: Mathematics
- Workplaces: Yale University; University of Virginia
- Doctoral advisor: Marston Morse
- Doctoral students: Walter Gottschalk; Annita Tuller

Gustav Arnold Hedlund (May 7, 1904 – March 15, 1993), an American mathematician, was one of the founders of symbolic and topological dynamics.

== Biography ==
Hedlund was born May 7, 1904, in Somerville, Massachusetts. He did his undergraduate studies at Harvard University, earned a master's degree from Columbia University, and returned to Harvard for his doctoral studies. He was a student of Marston Morse, under whose supervision he received a Ph.D. in 1930 with thesis entitled "I. Geodesics on a Two-Dimensional Riemannian Manifold with Periodic Coefficients II. Poincare's Rotation Number and Morse's Type Number".

While still studying at Columbia, Hedlund taught at Hunter College, and after receiving his doctorate he took a position at Bryn Mawr College, where he remained for nine years. From 1939 to 1948 he taught at the University of Virginia, after which he moved to Yale University. At Yale, he became the Philip Schuyler Beebe Professor of Mathematics, and chaired the mathematics department for ten years. He was also a member of the Institute for Advanced Study in Princeton, New Jersey, which he visited in 1933, 1938, and 1953. He was the Director of IDA's Communications Research Division in Princeton 1962-1963. He retired from Yale in 1972, but afterwards held a visiting professorship at Wesleyan University.

Hedlund died in 1993. He has over 200 academic descendants, many of them through two of his students at Virginia, Walter Gottschalk and W. Roy Utz, Jr.

== Research ==
One of Hedlund's early results was an important theorem about the ergodicity of geodesic flows. He also made significant contributions to symbolic dynamics, whose origins as a field of modern mathematics can be traced to a 1944 paper of Hedlund, and to topological dynamics.

The Curtis–Hedlund–Lyndon theorem, a topological characterization of cellular automata, is named after Hedlund. Hedlund first published this theorem in 1969, crediting Morton L. Curtis and Roger Lyndon as co-discoverers.

Hedlund was the co-author of the book Topological Dynamics (with Walter Gottschalk, American Mathematical Society, 1955).

== Awards and honors ==
Hedlund was elected to Sigma Xi in 1943.

In 1972, a conference on topological dynamics was held to honor Hedlund on the occasion of his retirement from Yale. The editor of the festschrift from the conference, Anatole Beck, wrote that it was "our token of respect to the man who did so much to foster and build this field".
