= List of Jay Jay the Jet Plane episodes =

This is a list of episodes of the television series Jay Jay the Jet Plane.

== Series overview ==
| Season | Episodes | Originally released | | |
| Season | Episodes | First released | Last released | Network |
|---|---|---|---|---|
| 1 | 12 | November 2, 1998 | December 21, 1998 | TLC |
| 2 | 14 | January 4, 1999 | January 21, 1999 | TLC |
| 3 | 14 | June 11, 2001 | July 20, 2001 | PBS |
| 4 | 10 | September 5, 2005 | November 25, 2005 | PBS |

== Pilot series (1994–1995) ==
All episodes in this season have been written by David Horwitz and directed by Mark McGovern.

| No. | Title | Original release date |
|---|---|---|
| 1 | "Jay Jay's First Flight" | December 13, 1994 |
| 2 | "Tracy's Fantastic Journey" | December 13, 1994 |
| 3 | "Herky's Bright Idea" | December 13, 1994 |
| 4 | "Old Oscar Steals the Show" | December 13, 1994 |
| 5 | "Jay Jay's Colorful Cover-Up" | February 21, 1995 |
| 6 | "Old Oscar Leads the Parade" | February 21, 1995 |
| 7 | "Snuffy's Birthday Surprise" | February 21, 1995 |
| 8 | "Tracy's Magic Moment" | February 21, 1995 |
| 9 | "Jay Jay and the Sparkleberry Tree" | October 3, 1995 |
| 10 | "Tracy's Handy Hideout" | October 3, 1995 |
| 11 | "Herky Uses His Head" | October 3, 1995 |
| 12 | "Snuffy and the Snowman" | October 3, 1995 |

== Television series (1998–05) ==
=== Season 1 (1998) ===
| No. overall | No. in season | Title | Directed by | Written by | Original release date |
|---|---|---|---|---|---|
| 1 | 1 | "Picture Day" | Chuck Cirino | Sean Catherine Derek & John Semper Jr. | November 2, 1998 |
| 1 | 1 | "Tracy's Song" | Chuck Cirino | John Semper Jr. | November 2, 1998 |
Today is Picture Day at E.Z. Airlines, and everyone is excited of getting their picture taken, except Snuffy as he thinks his propeller makes him look silly. Snuffy gripes about this all day until Old Oscar helps him discover that his propeller is what makes him special, and is glad that he has it. Song: I'm Finally Gonna See Myself Tracy is excited to sing about Amelia Earhart at a party, but a cold causes her to lose her voice right before the big event. With Snuffy's help, Tracy discovers that nobody has to use your voice to show something special to you. Song: Amelia
| 2 | 2 | "Hide and Seek" | Hugh Martin | John Semper Jr. | November 3, 1998 |
| 2 | 2 | "Big Jake's Birthday Surprise" | Hugh Martin | John Semper Jr. | November 3, 1998 |
While playing a game of Hide and Seek, Snuffy's skywriting smoke ends up giving away his and Jay Jay's hiding places, causing them to lose. Jay Jay has to understand that Snuffy's talent at skywriting is what makes him special, and should use it for a good thing. Song: You Are Unique It is Big Jake's birthday, and after E.Z. O'Malley sends him to do a long delivery, Jay Jay and friends have to think of what to give him. When Jay Jay cannot think of a present, he turns to searching for something that will give him an idea. Song: Nobody Does Things Better Than Big Jake
| 3 | 3 | "Catch the Buzz" | Hugh Martin | Sean Catherine Derek | November 4, 1998 |
| 3 | 3 | "Grumpy O'Malley" | Hugh Martin | Sean Catherine Derek & John Semper Jr. | November 4, 1998 |
When Big Jake gets a "buzzing" in his head causing him to not fly well, Jay Jay begins to get upset, thinking he is not his friend anymore. Jay Jay, Tracy, and Herky set out to find the source of Big Jake's buzzing by retracing the steps of his travel, and Jay Jay learns that just because someone's sick does not mean they do not like you. Song: What's The Matter With Big Jake Snuffy is asked to pick up E.Z. O'Malley's cousin Grumpy for their family reunion this afternoon, but upon meeting him, he is too scared to introduce himself. Snuffy soon learns that Grumpy is nice like everyone else, and after sharing his love of skywriting with his similar love for art, the two become friends. Song: That's What I'll Do
| 4 | 4 | "Snuffy's 1st Day of School" | Hugh Martin | Eleanor Burian-Mohr | November 5, 1998 |
| 4 | 4 | "Super Sonic Jay Jay" | Hugh Martin | Eleanor Burian-Mohr & John Semper Jr. | November 5, 1998 |
Snuffy is about to go to his first day of school, but he is scared that he hides. Jay Jay, Tracy and Herky have to search all over town to try and find him, and Snuffy is later visited by Old Oscar, who tells him that he was afraid of his first day of school, too. Song: The Very Merry Michael O. Tarry School" Hoping to be in the Tarrytown Book of Records, Jay Jay uses Savannah's supersonic jet fuel to fly really fast. But he goes out of control easily and he soon learns to ask before using someone else's things. Song: In The Record Book
| 5 | 5 | "Jay Jay and the Stars at Night" | Hugh Martin | John Semper Jr. | November 6, 1998 |
| 5 | 5 | "Hero Herky" | Hugh Martin | Sean Catherine Derek | November 6, 1998 |
Big Jake takes Jay Jay, Snuffy and Tracy on a camping trip, but Snuffy is afraid of the noises he hears throughout the night. Jay Jay helps him learn that there is nothing to be afraid of, and also learns himself to find his way home by the stars. Song: Your Very Own Star Herky becomes a famous hero after saving Sam Sticky at Frosty Pines, and suddenly lets it all go to his head. When it comes time to save Sam again, Herky gets stuck himself and soon learns the importance of teamwork. Song: Hero Herky
| 6 | 6 | "Wing Wigglin'" | Hugh Martin | Ernie Altbacker & John Semper Jr. | November 9, 1998 |
| 6 | 6 | "Tracy's Tree" | Hugh Martin | John Semper Jr. | November 9, 1998 |
Jay Jay and his friends go on a camping trip, but Jay Jay is intent on hiding his morning Wing Wiggling exercises from everyone, since he worries if someone sees him, they will think he is silly. He soon learns everyone else has something that seems silly, but it does not have to be kept secret. Song: Wing Wigglin' Tracy discovers a tree has grown in the middle of the runway, and insists it should be protected. Jay Jay and Herky do their best to prevent anyone from landing and ruining the tree as a result, while Tracy tries to find a way to visit the tree more often. Song: My Baby Tree
| 7 | 7 | "Super Loop-De-Loop" | Hugh Martin | Mark Hoffmeier | November 16, 1998 |
| 7 | 7 | "Jay Jay's Bad Dream" | Hugh Martin | Evelyn A.R. Gabai & John Semper Jr. | November 16, 1998 |
Old Oscar is excited to hear his old friend Winnie Winger is coming out to visit him, but he believes that she is coming to see his famous stunt, the Double-Over-Under-Upside-Down-Loop-De-Loop. Jay Jay helps him practice the move so that he is ready, unaware of that Winnie is only here to visit her old friend, and she does not mind the move at all. Song: Double Over...Loop-De-Loop When Jay Jay has a bad dream, he is too scared to go to sleep and refuses to tell his friends why. He later turns to an adult for help, which is how he will feel better about doing something good when feeling bad. Song: Digadeezip
| 8 | 8 | "Evan Gets His Wings" | Hugh Martin | John Semper Jr. | November 23, 1998 |
| 8 | 8 | "Snuffy Sees the Big Picture" | Hugh Martin | Mark Hoffmeier & John Semper Jr. | November 23, 1998 |
Revvin' Evan learns to fly from Herky after he attaches a balloon to him, so he can fly over the hills to witness a spectacle of hot air balloons. But when all goes wrong and Evan goes out of control, Herky learns that Evan is fine on the ground, and using their own strengths is what makes them both feel special. Song: That's What Makes The World Go Round Snuffy is practicing for drawing a very big sky picture for We Love Tarrytown Day, but his eyes become blurry and scratchy, resulting in him unable to see anything and fly out of control. Snuffy keeps his ailment a secret so he will not be unable to draw his picture, until he learns that it is important to remind someone that you are not feeling well. Song: The Biggest Picture
| 9 | 9 | "Switch Around Day" | Hugh Martin | Sean Catherine Derek & John Semper Jr. | November 30, 1998 |
| 9 | 9 | "Snuffy's Missing Friend" | Hugh Martin | Sean Catherine Derek & John Semper Jr. | November 30, 1998 |
When Savannah is willing to smell the flowers and Herky wants to travel at fast speed, the two have a "Switch Around Day" where they each try out each others jobs. Doing so, however, is not very easy, and they learn that it is important to just be happy with what they can do. Song: On a Switch-Around Day When Snuffy is lonely that the others are busy, he makes a new friend that does whatever he does, unaware that this new "friend" is his own shadow. When it disappears whenever the sun is gone, Tracy helps him discover the real thing and the fact everyone has a shadow of their own. Song: Two of a Kind
| 10 | 10 | "Missing You" | Hugh Martin | Terence Taylor | December 7, 1998 |
| 10 | 10 | "Tippy Toppy Peak" | Hugh Martin | Eleanor Burian-Mohr & John Semper Jr. | December 7, 1998 |
When Big Jake goes off to visit his uncle, Snuffy becomes lonely, especially the fact that he will be back soon, which is long. With Jay Jay's help, Snuffy tries to think of a way to keep him busy so he does not feel sad about missing Big Jake so much. Song: Bubble Gum Friend Since Tracy is not used to flying at very high levels yet, she has a lot to learn from Savannah, since it is important to keep trying. Her lessons are suddenly at risk when Snuffy and Herky think she is the best high flyer and believe she can fly over Tippy Toppy Peak, and is unable to admit that she cannot. Tracy soon learns that it is important to take some time to learn something new. Song: Flying Up
| 11 | 11 | "Tracy's Treasure Hunt" | Hugh Martin | Sean Catherine Derek John Semper Jr. | December 14, 1998 |
| 11 | 11 | "Jay Jay's New Wheels" | Hugh Martin | Terence Taylor | December 14, 1998 |
While playing Sky Pirates, Tracy decides to join Savannah for a real treasure hunt while following a map that Brenda discovered. During the hunt however, they do not find any treasure at all, until they realize the true friendship they have is their friendship. Song: Treasuring The Friendship That We've Got When Brenda Blue orders new wheels for the planes, Jay Jay refuses because he likes his old ones, in which he is had them for a long time. Problem soon arises when his old wheels begin to wear out, causing him to mess up in turn, and he soon learns that it is important to give up old things in order to stay safe. Song: Look At Me, I'm Fine
| 12 | 12 | "Jay Jay's Christmas Adventure" | Hugh Martin | John Semper Jr. | December 21, 1998 |
Christmas has come to Tarrytown Airport, and Jay Jay and his friends have last minute plans before the big day. Snuffy has trouble finding the perfect tree, Brenda Blue tries to help Jay Jay finish a rather long wish list, and Tracy and Herky plan to learn more about Santa Claus and even meet him in person. Later on Christmas Eve, a big blizzard hits which disappoints Jay Jay and his friends, and Santa Claus is unable to make his deliveries due to a sick reindeer that very night. To save the day, Old Oscar takes the kids to the North Pole where they make Santa's deliveries for him, and learn that it is better to give than to receive. Songs: O Christmas Tree, Jingle Bells, Santa's Little Helpers

=== Season 2 (1999) ===
All episodes of this season were directed by Hugh Martin.

| No. overall | No. in season | Title | Written by | Original release date |
|---|---|---|---|---|
| 13 | 1 | "Babysitting Blues" | Evelyn A.R. Gabai & John Semper Jr. | January 4, 1999 |
| 13 | 1 | "Jay Jay Earns His Wings" | David Horwitz | January 4, 1999 |
Hoping for a real "grown-up" job, Tracy volunteers to be Snuffy's babysitter for the day, but discovers she has to miss the Air Carnival to do so. Worried that she will not be a good babysitter, she discovers that she is wrong when Snuffy enjoys having fun with her and she is the greatest babysitter yet. Song: Following the Leader Jay Jay has finished his flight training and is about to face his first delivery route alone, but upon waking up early before doing so, he ends up falling asleep when he lands. Jay Jay learns from Big Jake that anyone can make mistakes, which helps him correct the route and get it done in time. Song: Caterpillar
| 14 | 2 | "Herky Jerky" | Evelyn A.R. Gabai & John Semper Jr. | January 5, 1999 |
| 14 | 2 | "Upside Down Waterfall" | John Semper Jr. | January 5, 1999 |
With the Harvest Moon Dance approaching, Herky does not know how to dance but refuses to learn so from his friends. Later, a trip to Lightning Bug Lake gives Herky the courage to learn with the help of the lightning bugs, and he ends up making a dance of his own thanks to the help of it. Song: Dancing Shoes While exploring, Snuffy notices something he has never seen before, and considers it to be an "upside down waterfall". Jay Jay does not think such a thing exists, until Brenda reminds him that he should believe Snuffy rather than doubt him, as maybe he is true after all. Song: Up Is Up
| 15 | 3 | "I'm Being Followed by the Moon" | John Semper Jr. | January 6, 1999 |
| 15 | 3 | "Something Special" | John Semper Jr. | January 6, 1999 |
Snuffy is uncomfortable with the moon "following" him wherever he goes, so he, Jay Jay and Tracy wish it away. Later, when Snuffy has a dream where he meets the Man in the Moon to undo the wish, he learns that the moon is an important part of the night. Song: I'm Being Followed By The Moon After rescuing Revvin' Evan from going off the road, Jay Jay gets upset when he learns that all of his friends have something special to themselves, except himself. Jay Jay sets out to find out his "special something", not knowing that he already has one. Song: A Special Something
| 16 | 4 | "Plane of a Different Color" | John Semper Jr. | January 7, 1999 |
| 16 | 4 | "Hiccup Havoc" | John Semper Jr. | January 7, 1999 |
After Tracy returns from a trip to the big city, she decides to be repainted so that she will feel more special. But when no one notices the difference, she ends up going too far, eventually learning that she is better just being the way she usually is. Song: Imagine Herky comes down with a crazy, yet severe case of the hiccups as a result of eating too many donuts, leaving Jay Jay and Snuffy to try several ways to get rid of them. When all goes not as planned, they later turn to Old Oscar for advice, and learn that it' is good to talk to an adult if you need help. Song: Turn These Hiccups Off
| 17 | 5 | "And That's the Tooth!" | John Semper Jr. | January 8, 1999 |
| 17 | 5 | "Big Jake's Team" | Evelyn A.R. Gabai John Semper Jr. | January 8, 1999 |
When Snuffy gets a loose tooth, he is excited about losing it and awaiting a visit from the Tooth Fairy, until he starts worrying it may fall out at a random time and get lost. Snuffy's friends try various methods to get his mind off of losing the tooth so he does not worry so much. Song: The Truth About Losing a Tooth When Big Jake is upset due to a performance by the Wonderbirds is cancelled, Jay Jay, Tracy and Savannah decide to work with him as a team to stand in. But when all does not go well, Big Jake considers quitting, until the others teach him it is important to never give up and respect your friends. Song: Watch and Listen
| 18 | 6 | "I Love Your Funny Face" | John Semper Jr. | January 11, 1999 |
| 18 | 6 | "Snuffy's Rainbow" | John Semper Jr. | January 11, 1999 |
When a clown visits Tarrytown Airport, Jay Jay, Tracy and Herky play a new game, Funny Face, where one has to make the other laugh by making a funny face. But since Jay Jay will do anything to win, he fails to follow Brenda Blue's wise advice and as a result, his face gets stuck. Song: Funny Face When Snuffy witnesses a rainbow after a storm, he goes off to chase it but it keeps disappearing while trying to do so. Snuffy later learns from a dream that a rainbow is something that can be enjoyed from a distance. Song: Color Me a Rainbow
| 19 | 7 | "The Buddy System" | John Semper Jr. | January 12, 1999 |
| 19 | 7 | "The Great Tarrytown Blackout" | John Semper Jr. | January 12, 1999 |
Jay Jay and Tracy set out on a flight together to Sunshine Desert, learning to stick together thanks to using the "Buddy System" method. But when the two split up and get lost as a result, they soon learn that sticking together is important when they go on trips in the future. Song: Together Is a Better Way to Be Herky becomes so impressed by Tracy's flying, he ends up following her around everywhere, not leaving her alone. His constant following is put to the test when a blackout later hits Tarrytown, and learns about leaving someone alone sometimes. Song: She's Incredible
| 20 | 8 | "Jay Jay Meets the Cloud King" | John Semper Jr. | January 13, 1999 |
| 20 | 8 | "The Merit Badge" | John Semper Jr. | January 13, 1999 |
While cloud watching, Jay Jay notices an S.O.S. in the sky and follows it to the mysterious Cloud King, who asks him a favor to return him his long lost cloud, Puffy. Jay Jay's attempt to bring Puffy home turns into a challenge when Puffy causes a fog across the airport, and both later learns that there is no place like home. Song: What Can a Little Plane Do? Herky is excited when he receives an invitation to join the Chopper Scouts of America, but before he gets inducted he has to do a good deed. Herky attempts to be brave and bold while trying to find a single deed to perform, and soon learns that any good deed, big or small, comes from the heart. Song: Proper Chopper Scout
| 21 | 9 | "Are We There Yet?" | John Semper Jr. | January 14, 1999 |
| 21 | 9 | "Problem in Pangabula" | Evelyn A.R. Gabai & John Semper Jr. | January 14, 1999 |
When Snuffy goes along with Jay Jay, Tracy and Big Jake on a trip to Pangabula Island, he repeatedly keeps asking if they are there, since this is his first long flight. Jay Jay and Tracy have to come up with a way to distract Snuffy so he does not get bored. Song: A Traveling Song Jay Jay, Snuffy and Tracy discover that the Sparkleberry Tree on Pangabula Island has lost its sparkle. The kids set out on a mission to save the tree, by making sure it has enough soil, sunlight and water to be sparkly again. Song: Clean It Up
| 22 | 10 | "Jay Jay's Dinosaur Hunt" | Evelyn A.R. Gabai Story by : John Semper Jr. | January 15, 1999 |
| 22 | 10 | "Dough-Nutty" | John Semper Jr. | January 15, 1999 |
After seeing a dinosaur movie, Jay Jay, Tracy and Herky decide to go on a hunt for a real-live dinosaur. When they spot mysterious footprints at the airport, they are convinced they are dinosaur footprints until learning the true nature about the dinosaurs' true life. Song: Dinosaur Hunt Herky loves donuts, and after a visit to Andy's Donut Shop, he ends up eating so many that he becomes overweight and cannot finish his new delivery route. Jay Jay and Tracy help him and Herky soon learns that sometimes you can have too much of a good thing. Song: Too Many
| 23 | 11 | "Snuffy Discovers the Ocean" | Sean Catherine Derek | January 18, 1999 |
| 23 | 11 | "Jay Jay's Speedy Delivery" | Sean Catherine Derek & John Semper Jr. | January 18, 1999 |
Snuffy is fascinated by Gilbert, a fish Brenda Blue brought home from the ocean, and wonders what it is like to be there. When he has a dream where Gilbert talks to him and he goes there, he enjoys it, only to learn that the ocean is not the best place for a plane. Song: Goin' to the Ocean In order to have more time to play after his chores, Jay Jay decides to rush through the work. But this is taken to the limit when Jay Jay forgets to fuel up before the next job, and he soon learns that it is better to be safe than sorry. Song: I'm a Speedy Guy
| 24 | 12 | "Dog Gone Doggy" | Sean Catherine Derek | January 19, 1999 |
| 24 | 12 | "Herky's Hat Chase" | Sean Catherine Derek John Semper Jr. | January 19, 1999 |
Brenda Blue asks Jay Jay to take care of her dog, King, while she goes away on business, and Jay Jay tries to prove himself responsible while doing so. But when he eventually loses King by leaving him to play a game of Sky Tag, he soon learns from Big Jake that everyone makes mistakes, and telling someone is a way of being responsible. Song: You Can Count On Me When a mighty wind carries Brenda Blue's favorite hat away, Herky rushes to catch it, but refuses help from anyone. When all does not go well, Herky soon learns to accept the help of his friends in big situations. Song: Won'tcha Come Back To Me
| 25 | 13 | "The Three Little Planes" | John Semper Jr. | January 20, 1999 |
| 25 | 13 | "I'm Swamped!" | John Semper Jr. | January 20, 1999 |
On a rainy day, Jay Jay and his friends are bored until Savannah suggests they use their imaginations to play a game of pretend. Together, the gang acts out the story of "The Three Little Planes" and learn they do not have to wait to use their imagination. Song: Imagination Celebration When Savannah feels homesick upon remembering her old home in Georgia, Tracy and Jay Jay go with Big Jake on a trip to find a rare swamp lily from the Okefenokee Swamp so that she will feel better. But when they come upon a swamp and does not turn out as they imagined, Big Jake helps them to discover that sometimes beauty comes from even the strangest of places. Song: Okefenokee
| 26 | 14 | "Old Oscar Leads the Parade" | Mark Hoffmeier & John Semper Jr. | January 21, 1999 |
| 26 | 14 | "Revvin' Evan's Day" | John Semper Jr. | January 21, 1999 |
While the E.Z. Airlines fleet is practicing for the annual Tarrytown Sky Parade, Jay Jay and Tracy wonder why Old Oscar leads the parade every year. Big Jake tells them the story of how he and E.Z. O'Malley founded E.Z. Airlines and the kids come up with a way to thank Old Oscar for his work. Song: The Tarrytown Sky Parade When Jay Jay starts to believe his chores are harder than everyone else's, he joins Revvin' Evan for his, which turn out to be harder than he thought. When he cannot keep up, Jay Jay soon learns to appreciate the hard work everyone does, even if it is hard. Song: I'm Revvin' Revvin' Evan

=== Season 3 (2001) ===
Like season 2, all of the episodes are directed by Hugh Martin.

| No. overall | No. in season | Title | Written by | Original release date |
|---|---|---|---|---|
| 27 | 1 | "Spending Time with Big Jake" | Evelyn A.R. Gabai | June 11, 2001 |
| 27 | 1 | "The New Plane" | John Semper Jr. | June 11, 2001 |
Jay Jay enjoys going to Lightning Bug Lake with Big Jake, but when Big Jake overhears Jay Jay telling his friends that his times with him are boring, he gets worried and starts making their trips more exciting. When Jay Jay does not keep up, both learn the lesson of being honest with each other, and nothing can take place of something else. Song: I Wanna Be With You When Snuffy the Skywriter first arrives in Tarrytown, Jay Jay's friends are intent on showing him around, rather than plan the camping trip Jay Jay was anticipating. Jay Jay begins to get upset about everyone paying attention to Snuffy instead of him, until Brenda helps him learn that just because there is someone new, it does not mean no one can stop being his friend. Song: Fun Plus One
| 28 | 2 | "Tracy's Shooting Star" | Megan Brown, John Semper Jr., Ellen Anderson & Don MacMannis, Ph.D. | June 12, 2001 |
| 28 | 2 | "Upsy Downosis" | Megan Brown, John Semper Jr., Phil Baron | June 12, 2001 |
Tracy longs to see a shooting star of her own, but when she misses it, she does not want to stop until she sees one. All does not go well until she turns to Brenda, when she learns waiting is worthwhile. Song: The First Time That I See A Shooting Star Jay Jay and his friends are preparing for a trip to the Rivertown Fair, but Herky suddenly comes down with Upsy Downosis, a cold that causes planes to fly upside down. Herky attempts to hide his illness from everyone so he will not stay home, until he learns that it is best to let someone know you are not feeling well. Song: At The Fair
| 29 | 3 | "The Opposites Game" | Megan Brown; Story by : John Semper Jr. | June 13, 2001 |
| 29 | 3 | "Tracy's Sonic Boom" | Ellen Anderson & Don MacMannis, Ph.D. Story by : John Semper Jr. | June 13, 2001 |
Jay Jay challenges Herky and Snuffy to a game of opposites one morning, and tries to stump Herky by thinking of what is the opposite of "Snuffy". Unable to figure out the answer, Herky turns to Old Oscar for advice and learns that sometimes he has to look at something a different way to figure things out. Song: The Opposites Game Savannah promises Tracy to teach her how to do one of her famous sonic booms, but Tracy is so anticipated that she tries to do it herself. She ends up going too far and crashes, and soon learns that some things need to be learned with the help of an adult. Song: Super Sonic Boom
| 30 | 4 | "Jay Jay's Butterfly Adventure" | John Semper Jr. | June 14, 2001 |
| 30 | 4 | "The Singing Meadow" | Megan Brown; Story by : John Semper Jr. | June 14, 2001 |
Winter is about to arrive, and Jay Jay is worried his butterfly friend Breezy will not find his way home in time. Later when a big chill hits, Jay Jay is taken on a trip through the hills, where he learns that nature can take care of itself. Song: Breezy Tracy hears some mysterious singing coming from Smiling Meadow, but cannot figure out who or what is causing it. With the help of her friends, Tracy searches for the source of the music and learns there is always an answer to a mystery and has to keep trying until she finds out. Song: Where Does the Music Come From?
| 31 | 5 | "Jay Jay Meets Captain Hightower" | John Semper Jr. | June 15, 2001 |
| 31 | 5 | "Tracy's Snuggly Blanket" | Evelyn A.R. Gabai | June 15, 2001 |
When traffic grows at Tarrytown Airport, Brenda has the fleet take turns so they do not get in each other's way, but this eventually causes everyone to be slow. Jay Jay decides to get Old Oscar's traffic-controller friend Captain Hightower to fix the mess, and he soon learns that even the most impossible problem can be fixed if friends work together. Song: Taking Turns Time Just before the gang signs up for the Tarrytown Scavenger Hunt, Tracy is so occupied with playing with her childhood blanket, but refuses to let anyone see her thinking she is acting babyish. Later when the blanket goes missing, her friends help her find it, and Tracy discovers she does not have to give up something she likes because she thinks she should. Song: My Snuggly Wuggly One
| 32 | 6 | "Fire Engine Evan" | John Semper Jr. | June 18, 2001 |
| 32 | 6 | "Tracy's Candy Catastrophe" | John Semper Jr. | June 18, 2001 |
Revvin' Evan has been appointed Tarrytown Airport's temporary substitute fire engine, and appoints Jay Jay and the others as his team members. But when vigorous training sessions cause the team to sleep through a real fire, Evan is forced to face the fire alone, and learns the prospect of being respectful of the time and energy of others. Song: Fire Fighter Crew Tracy receives a basket of candy from Savannah and suddenly finishes it all up, so she wishes for all the candy in the world. Her obsession is put to the limit when she is given the ability to turn anything into candy by one touch, and soon learns that too much of a good thing can be very bad. Song: Candy Crazy
| 33 | 7 | "Tuffy the Tiny Tow Truck" | John Semper Jr. | June 19, 2001 |
| 33 | 7 | "Snuffy's Snowman" | John Semper Jr. | June 19, 2001 |
When Revvin' Evan's cousin Tuffy the Tow Truck comes to Tarrytown for the first time, she has to pass a test which involves pulling one of the planes. When she could not do so probably because she is small, Tuffy proves she never gives up and teaches Jay Jay and friends to never judge someone by their size, but by their heart and spirit. Song: I Never Give Up! While at Frosty Pines, Snuffy and the gang build a snowman named Jack Frosty, and Snuffy wants to bring him back to the airport with them. But once there, Jack Frosty begins to melt and Snuffy soon learns that Jack Frosty has to stay at Frosty Pines, as that is where cold things never melt. Song: Mr. Snowman
| 34 | 8 | "Tuffy's Buried Treasure" | Megan Brown; Story by : John Semper Jr. | June 20, 2001 |
| 34 | 8 | "Snuffy's Thanksgiving" | Megan Brown; Story by : John Semper Jr. | June 20, 2001 |
Jay Jay, Revvin' Evan, and Tuffy discover a map and follow it, hoping it leads them to buried treasure. But when they end up in a cave where they meet a friendly geologist, they help him excavate a hidden crystalline and learn that Earth has the best treasure of all. Song: I Like Surprises It is Thanksgiving, and Jay Jay and his friends are preparing for the dinner that is to take place that evening. However, Snuffy cannot figure out what Thanksgiving is truly about, and the plans are put on hold when Big Jake gets trapped in a snowstorm and needs help getting home on time. Song: Full-Of-Wonder, Wonderful Day
| 35 | 9 | "Snuffy and the Colors of Fall" | John Semper Jr. | June 21, 2001 |
| 35 | 9 | "Snuffy's Birthday Surprise" | John Semper Jr. | June 21, 2001 |
With Fall approaching, Jay Jay hopes to see the foliage change color, but Snuffy misinterprets this and decides to surprise Jay Jay by spraying paint all over the hills. Upon learning the mistake, Snuffy learns that the foliage changes itself. Song: My Rainbow World Snuffy's birthday is coming, but Snuffy does not know what he wants for his present. When the others suggest ideas for him that simply do not work for him, Snuffy eventually discovers what he wants and later shows his friends that the best present of all is helping someone. Song: Happiness Is Helping All the Rest
| 36 | 10 | "A Trip to Skylandia" | Megan Brown; Story by : John Semper Jr. | June 22, 2001 |
| 36 | 10 | "Brenda's Mother's Day" | John Semper Jr. | June 22, 2001 |
Jay Jay is uncertain whether castles in the sky exist or not, but all this suddenly comes to him when he hits a wind spout and ends up in the sky high kingdom of Skylandia, where the subjects refuse to believe Tarrytown exists below. Jay Jay tries to convince the subjects that you do not have to see something unusual to believe it exists, all while learning the same. Song: Check It With Your Heart On Mother's Day, Tracy and the gang decide to make the airport extra special before the arrival of Brenda Blue's mother. Try as they might though, Tracy's plans end up going wrong, until she learns that what is important is the time Brenda spends with her mother and the kids. Song: Thank You, Mrs. Blue
| 37 | 11 | "Tuffy's Trip to Pangabula" | John Semper Jr. | June 29, 2001 |
| 37 | 11 | "Tuffy's Adventure in Pangabula" | John Semper Jr. | June 29, 2001 |
Tuffy is excited about going to Pangabula Island for the first time, but the only problem is she has to fly in order to get there. Snuffy decides to use a balloon for help, and after various problems, they learn anything is possible if they work together. While on Pangabula Island, Tuffy is annoyed upon believing she has no special talent like Jay Jay, Tracy & Big Jake, and sets out to find it. When a hurricane hits and the Sparkleberry Tree is in distress, she realizes her true talent and learns she sometimes has to wait until she can use it. Songs: Going There With You, Make My Day
| 38 | 12 | "Jay Jay's Winter Parade" | John Semper Jr. | July 6, 2001 |
| 38 | 12 | "Snuffy's Seasons" | John Semper Jr. | July 6, 2001 |
Jay Jay has planned a Parade of Lights to celebrate the first day of winter and as a gift for all his friends and the other folks of Tarrytown. But when a snowstorm hits, the parade has to be cancelled to his dismay, leaving his friends surprise him with a parade of their own. Song: An Amazing Blazing Light Parade On a snowy day, Snuffy does not know how to remember the four seasons and what order they are in. Jay Jay, Tracy and Herky help him remember it all by having him reminisce about the fun times they had during those seasons. Song: Circle of the Seasons
| 39 | 13 | "Jay Jay and the Magic Books" | John Semper Jr. | July 13, 2001 |
| 39 | 13 | "The Counting Game" | Megan Brown; Story by : John Semper Jr. | July 13, 2001 |
Bad weather forces Big Jake to cancel a trip, so Tracy takes Jay Jay to the library where adventures abound no matter the weather. There, Jay Jay learns to use his imagination to "transport" himself to various places via the books, while learning that books can take him on all kinds of adventures. Song: Oceans of Fun Jay Jay, Tracy and Herky decide to play the "Counting Game", where you count a number of things as you find them. When it is Tracy's turn after Jay Jay gets to eleven, Tracy nearly runs out of time until she discovers that sometimes the answer can be right in front of her. Song: The Counting Game
| 40 | 14 | "Concert Day at Tarrytown Airport" | John Semper Jr. | July 20, 2001 |
| 40 | 14 | "Snuffy's Favorite Color" | John Semper Jr. | July 20, 2001 |
The E.Z. Airlines Fleet is participating in the upcoming Tarrytown Concert Day, where each gets to sing about their favorite color. Snuffy does not have a favorite and has a hard time using inspiration from the others' numbers, until a rainbow gives him inspiration for a special song of his own. The next day, Snuffy's rainbow song has become a hit at Concert Day, but he still has not chosen a definite favorite color yet. After Concert Day was a big success, Snuffy and Jay Jay spend a long day the next day following duties by Brenda, which may be the source of Snuffy's answer. Songs: Wrap Me Up In Yellow, Absolutely Blue, Green Green Green, Bound To See A Little Brown, Orange, One Rainbow, My Favorite

=== Season 4: Jay Jay's Mysteries (2005) ===
| No. overall | No. in season | Title | Directed by | Written by | Original release date |
|---|---|---|---|---|---|
| 41 | 1 | "The Mystery of Plants" | Bruce D. Johnson & Mark Young | John Semper Jr. | September 5, 2005 |
| 42 | 2 | "The Mystery of Weather" | Bruce D. Johnson & Mark Young | Ernie Altbacker | September 12, 2005 |
| 43 | 3 | "The Mystery of Size and Shape" | Bruce D. Johnson & Mark Young | Kathleen Townsley | September 19, 2005 |
| 44 | 4 | "The Mystery of Flight" | Bruce D. Johnson & Mark Young | Krista Tucker | September 26, 2005 |
| 45 | 5 | "The Mystery of the Five Senses" | Bruce D. Johnson & Mark Young | Evelyn A.R. Gabai | October 3, 2005 |
| 46 | 6 | "The Mystery of Water" | Hugh Martin | Cheryl Asherton | October 10, 2005 |
| 47 | 7 | "The Mystery of Bugs" | Hugh Martin | Jim Martin | October 17, 2005 |
| 48 | 8 | "The Mystery of Time" | Hugh Martin | Kathleen Townsley | October 24, 2005 |
| 49 | 9 | "The Mystery of Stars and Planets" | Hugh Martin | John Semper Jr. | October 31, 2005 |
| 50 | 10 | "The Mystery of Dinosaurs" | Hugh Martin | Salom Coleman | November 25, 2005 |
