= Roanoke Valley Chess Club =

- Type: Regional Chess Club
- Founded: 1947
- Location: Roanoke, Virginia
- Country: United States
- Major events: Walter Muir Tournament
- Website: Official Website

The Roanoke Valley Chess Club was founded in 1947 in Roanoke, Virginia, and is the oldest continuously operating chess club in the Commonwealth of Virginia. The Roanoke Valley Chess Club receives an annual grant from the Dorothy S. and Walter Muir Memorial Fund, managed by the Foundation for the Roanoke Valley. The Roanoke Valley Chess Club is an IRS non-profit 501(c)(3) organization, registered with the Virginia State Corporation Commission. The Roanoke Valley Chess Club brings and sustains chess activities to the region, and holds regular events. These events include United States Chess Federation USCF Grand Prix tournaments. The club also holds volunteer annual outreach events during Roanoke's annual Festival in the Park, Grandin Court Block Party, and more.

== Mission statement ==
"The Roanoke Valley Chess Club is Virginia's oldest continuously-operating chess club. It exists to promote chess among people of all ages, and holds regular events, including tournaments that are rated by the United States Chess Federation."

The Roanoke Valley Chess Club is affiliated with the United States Chess Federation (USCF). "Casual Play, USCF Rated Events, Unrated Events, Blitz Events, Club Championships, Sets Available, Clocks Available, Book Library, Chess Items for Sale, Classes Offered, Lectures Offered, Private Lessons Offered, Simuls Offered, Under Age 18 Welcome, Beginners Welcome, Handicap Accessible."

== Tournaments ==
The Roanoke Valley chess club hosts the annual Walter Muir tournament. "As part of its series of special, one-day, Grand Prix, rated tournaments, the Roanoke Valley Chess Club recently held its annual WALTER MUIR MEMORIAL GRAND PRIX CHESS TOURNAMENT." Walter Muir (1905-1999) was the former president of the Roanoke Valley chess Club and International Master of Correspondence Chess. Walter Muir also founded the United States Postal Chess Union and former secretary of the ICCF U.S.A. He was a philanthropist and benefactor to numerous Roanoke Valley organizations and individuals.

The Roanoke Valley Chess Club also hosted the annual Tracy Callis Jr. Memorial Grand Pix tournament. This was a 15 Grand Prix USCF-rated tournament. Mr. Tracy Callis, Sr., supported this memorial tournament to honor his son, Tracy G. Callis, Jr., (1968–2009). "We still fondly remember Tracy Callis Jr. - a great, friendly person who deserves to be remembered by all of us for doing what he loved: playing chess!" The recently sold "Team Shirt" for the Roanoke Valley Chess Club had an option for including the "Tracy Callis Grand Prix Sunset Memorial" embroidered on the chest.

== St Baldrick's Day ==
The Roanoke Valley Chess Club also participates with the St. Baldrick's Foundation each year to raise money for children's cancer research. Members of the Roanoke Valley Chess Club's are also "Knights of the Bald Table" and shave their heads as "Shavee", while others contribute to the charity cancer fund. The Roanoke Valley Chess Club had about ten percent head shaving participation among the members, and raised their financial goal in fundraising for research for children's cancer.

== Notable members ==
- Chase Bailey. "At 21 years old, Chase Bailey is an aspiring chess master and amateur chess instructor. He’s trying to make a career out of chess—playing, winning tournaments and instructing... His crowning achievement came last fall when, right after reaching the minimum legal age of 21, he won $7,000 in the 2016 Millionaire Chess Tournament in Atlantic City, New Jersey."
- Courtney Barnes has the Chess title of "Chess Expert", teaches chess to adult and junior members, and is also a local Tournament Director (TD) and organizer. "During the June tournament in Roanoke, Courtney Barnes of Roanoke won second place and Felix McCain of Lynchburg placed third."
- Nelson Bond organized and helped form the Roanoke Valley Chess Club from several informal chess clubs and groups in Roanoke, Virginia, in 1947.
- Tracy G. Callis, Jr. (1968–2009) was a well liked member, and after his death his family supported an annual chess tournament by the Roanoke Valley Chess Club in his memory. In the Chess rating system, Tracy was in the 1800s.
- Michael Huff has been the club president and part of the board of directors, and also has been a "Shavee" participant in the annual St. Baldrick's Foundation head shaving charity fund raising.
- Nalin Jha won the Virginia State Amateur Chess Championship on September 2–4, 2017, at Richmond, Virginia. His rating from the tournament is now 1740, which makes him among the top rated players of any age in the Roanoke Valley. Nalin Jha has also been consistently placed on the Honor rolls for North Cross School in Salem, Virginia.
- Ray Megginson is a board member of the RVCC and is an annual "Shavee" participant in the St. Baldrick's Foundation head shaving charity fund raising called, "Checkmate Cancer!".
- Charles Morgan has the Chess title of "National Master"and has been the "State Champion" of both West Virginia and Arizona.
- Leonard Morgan is a former Virginia State Champion (1955).
- Walter Muir (1905–1999) had the Chess title of "International Master of Chess" and was also the former secretary of the ICCF U.S.A. Walter Muir was also a local philanthropist and benefactor, and the former president of the Roanoke Valley Chess Club. The chess club's annual Walter Muir Chess Tournament is held in his honor.
- Russell "Rusty" Potter is chairman of the board of directors of the Roanoke Valley Chess Club. He has the Chess title of "Original Life Master" and has three times been made Virginia State Champion. Rusty also teaches chess to adult and junior members of the club. "In other chess news, the 2017 Walter Muir Memorial Tournament, a three-round Grand Prix, USCF-rated open chess tournament sponsored by the Roanoke Valley Chess Club, will be held" on August 20, 2017.
