= Park Hee-byung =

Korean activist (1871–1907)

- Hangul: 박희병
- Hanja: 朴羲秉
- RR: Bak Huibyeong
- MR: Pak Hŭibyŏng

Art name
- Hangul: 성천
- Hanja: 醒川
- RR: Seongcheon
- MR: Sŏngch'ŏn

Park Hee-byung (1871, Gangwon, Korea – June 13, 1907, Denver, Colorado) was a Korean independence activist and one of the first Korean immigrants to the U.S. state of Colorado.

== Life and death ==
Park first came to the United States in 1900 with Yi Gang, fifth son of Emperor Gojong; the two studied together at Roanoke College in Salem, Virginia. After his graduation, Park established a mining school in his homeland, but soon returned to North America, where he first went to Mexico in August 1905 before coming to Colorado in January 1906. He rose to prominence as a local community leader there along with Yun Byeong-gu and his nephew Pak Yong-man, helping to organise Denver-area Koreans for the Korean independence movement. He hoped to campaign for Korea's freedom at the 1908 Democratic National Convention, but was killed under mysterious circumstances in a suspected assassination in 1907 and buried in an unmarked grave at Denver's Riverside Cemetery, where he lay forgotten for almost a century.

== Discovery of grave ==
In 2003, South Korean scholars doing research on immigration to the United States found records about Park in Korea and began to look through Denver cemetery records in an attempt to find him. After his burial site was identified, the local Korean American association held a ceremony in October 2007, during which they erected a new $3,000 granite headstone with a bilingual epitaph describing Park's life and accomplishments; 50 people attended the ceremony, including South Korean consul general Koo Bon-woo.
