= Miriam Becker =

American mathematician (1909–2000)

Miriam Freda Becker (later Miriam Mazur, March 30, 1909 – March 5, 2000) was an American mathematician whose career became a test case for unionization and academic tenure in the City University of New York system in the 1930s.

== Early life and education ==
Becker was the middle of three children of an immigrant family; her mother came from Russia and her father, an insurance salesman, from Austria. She majored in mathematics at Hunter College, in the City University of New York system, graduating in 1930, earned a master's degree there in 1932, and became a doctoral student at Yale University. She completed her Ph.D. in 1934 under the supervision of Øystein Ore, with the dissertation On Relative Fields.

== Contract dispute ==
She became a tutor at Hunter College in 1934, on a year-by-year teaching contract. In 1937, the college decided not to renew her tutor position, replacing her with Annita Tuller. This dismissal became the subject of a legal battle between the Teachers Union of New York and the Board of Higher Education of New York City, with the Teachers Union contending that a 1935 law for high school teachers (under which someone who had been teaching for three years could only be fired for cause) should also apply to City University faculty, and the Board of Higher Education instead preferring a more standard academic tenure review process that did not become automatic after such a short time. The board refused to review her case, in November 1937; a month later, the court decided that she should be reinstated, but by early 1938 the Court of Appeals reversed that ruling and she was not reinstated.

== Later life ==
After postdoctoral research at the Institute for Advanced Study, based on research she had done at Yale with Saunders Mac Lane, Becker became a high school teacher in Manhattan and later the Bronx. In 1940 she married biochemist Abraham Mazur, and soon after she stopped teaching to raise her two children. She returned to high school teaching in 1954. In 1964 she returned to the City University of New York as an assistant professor of mathematics at the City College of New York; she was tenured as an associate professor in 1972, and retired in 1977. She died on March 5, 2000.
