= Walter Muir =

American chess player (1905–1999)

Walter G. Muir (1905 – December 29, 1999) was a correspondence chess player and former secretary of the ICCF U.S.A. Walter Muir was also a philanthropist and benefactor, and former president of the Roanoke Valley Chess Club. The annual Walter Muir Chess Tournament is held in his honor.

Both of Walter Muir's parents were Canadian citizens. He was married to Dorothy Saunders Muir for 65 years. He surveyed the right-of-way between Albany, New York and New York City for the New York Power and Light Company between 1931-1932. Walter Muir was a resident of Salem, Virginia and Roanoke, Virginia for many years. He had also been an employee with General Electric for 46 years. He was known for wearing a white dinner jacket and bow tie during tournaments, and was very fond of the Evans Gambit with white.

== Chess accomplishments ==
Walter Muir was a renowned international openings theoretician on many double king pawn openings. Many of his chess games between 1933 and 1987 were recorded and are still available for study and review online.

== Correspondence chess ==
He began to play correspondence chess in 1925. Walter Muir was known as "The Grand Old Man of Correspondence Chess". "It is probably not an understatement to say that Walter Muir has been the single most influential person in the development of correspondence chess in the United States. He has been a dominant force in postal play on a national and international level for almost five decades. He fully deserves recognition as the "Dean of American Correspondence Chess."

He was the founder of the United States Postal Chess Union. Awarded the rank of International Correspondence Chess Master in 1971. In a short biography published by the US Chess Federation, it said: "Nine times Canadian Correspondence Chess Association Champion (1928, 1932, 1933, 1934, 1935, 1936, 1939, 1942), twice British Overseas CC Champion, 16 time champion of the Illinois CCA, winner of nine ICCF Master Tournaments, qualified seven times for ICCF World Championship second-round play, and played on four Olympiad teams for the United States."

The Walter Muir Memorial Invitational Correspondence Chess Tournament is named in his honor, and is supported by both the ICCF U.S.A. and the Canadian Correspondence Chess Association. He was awarded the International Correspondence Chess Master title in 1971.

== Dorothy S. and Walter Muir Memorial Fund ==
The Dorothy S. and Walter Muir Memorial Fund Established through the estate of Walter Muir, this fund supports the Roanoke Valley Chess Club, the Fintel Library at Roanoke College and the Western Virginia Foundation for the Arts and Sciences.

== Bibliography ==
- Muir-Hogenauer Chess Collection. University of Louisville. University Library. The collection of chess master and correspondence chess champion Walter Muir (1905-2000). Three hundred volumes, correspondence, and artifacts, including a complete run of British Chess Magazine, the rare 1723 edition of the Italian treatise Il Giuoco Degli Scacchi, and Walter Muir's autobiography My 75 year chess career (1997). This endowed collection also includes Walter Muir's chess pieces, boards, and table.Muir-Hogenauer Chess Collection.
- Muir, Walter, and Jerry Hopfer. My 75 Year Chess Career: An Autobiography of My Life. Pittsburgh: HopScotch Ink, 1997. ISBN 978-0965942706.
- Thomas, Donna, Peter Thomas, Emanuel Lasker, and Walter Muir. The Chess Game. Santa Cruz, CA: Peter & Donna Thomas, 2011. "The king and queen chess pieces were modeled from the chess set of Walter G. Muir."
