= Jay Jay the Jet Plane =

American live action/3D-animated television series

- Also known as: Jay Jay
- Genre: Children's television series; Musical
- Created by: David Michel; Deborah Michel
- Written by: John Semper; Eleanor Burian-Mohr
- Starring: Eve Whittle (US); Vanessa Stacey (UK); Brian Nahas
- Voices of: Mary Kay Bergman; Debi Derryberry; Julie Renick; Gina Ribisi; Chuck Morgan; Sandy Fox; Donna Cherry; Michael Donovan
- Narrated by: John William Galt (pilot series); Chuck Morgan (US; TLC era); Michael Donovan (US; PBS Kids era); Brian Cant (UK)
- Theme music composer: Stephen Michael Schwartz; Parachute Express
- Opening theme: "Gee, How I Love to Fly" (1994–1995); "Jay Jay the Jet Plane Theme Song" (1998–2005)
- Ending theme: "Gee, How I Love to Fly" (Reprise) (1994–2000); "Jay Jay the Jet Plane Theme Song" (2001–2005)
- Composers: Craig Dobbin; Brian Mann
- Country of origin: United States
- Original language: English
- No. of seasons: 4
- No. of episodes: 62 (list of episodes)

Production
- Executive producers: David Michel; Bruce D. Johnson; William T. Baumann; Chris Walker
- Producer: David Michel
- Running time: 24 minutes (seasons 1-2); 28 minutes (seasons 3-4)
- Production companies: Direct-to-Video series: KidQuest, Inc. Television series: PorchLight Entertainment; Modern Cartoons; Wonderwings.com Entertainment; Knightscove Family Films (Series 3)

Original release
- Network: Direct-to-video
- Release: December 13, 1994 – October 3, 1995
- Network: TLC (Ready Set Learn!) (seasons 1-2); PBS (PBS Kids) (seasons 3-4)
- Release: November 2, 1998 – November 25, 2005

Jay Jay the Jet Plane is an American live-action/3D-animated musical children's television series created by David and Deborah Michel and first aired on TLC and later moved to PBS, with reruns on Qubo and TBN's Smile. The series aired for a total of 4 seasons and has 62 episodes.

== Premise ==
The series is centered on a group of anthropomorphic aircraft that live in the fictional city of Tarrytown, taking place at E.Z. Airlines at Tarrytown Airport. The episodes were commonly distributed in 25-minute-long (without commercials) pairs, with one header sequence and one end credit for each pair. Each episode contains one or more songs.

The series was intended to be educational to teach moral and life lessons to young-aged children.

== Music ==
The theme song and all of the other songs were composed by the famous children's singer/songwriter Stephen Michael Schwartz and sung by his popular musical group, Parachute Express. The end credits music during the original airings of seasons 1–3 was a reprise of "Gee, How I Love to Fly", which was changed to a new instrumental tune for repeats from late 2001 onwards.

== History ==
=== Original series ===
==== Early episodes using physical models (as "Pilot Series") ====
In late 1994, a short live-action series was produced at AMS Production Company in Dallas, with real model plane characters and handcrafted human characters; they had the same personalities as in the later series. This original series was narrated similarly to the first twelve seasons of the original Thomas & Friends, or Theodore Tugboat. Three videos were released: Jay Jay's First Flight on December 13, 1994, Old Oscar Leads the Parade on February 21, 1995, and Tracy's Handy Hideout on October 3 of that same year. This original series was narrated by and features the voices of John William Galt; these three were known as the "pilot series". (Note: Originally titled The Adventures of Jay Jay the Jet Plane and his Flying Friends from December 13, 1994 to February 21, 1995, then retitled as just Jay Jay the Jet Plane on October 3 of that same year.)

==== 3D and live-action-based episodes ====
On November 2, 1998, the hybrid 3D-animated/live-action series premiered on TLC as part of the Ready Set Learn! block. The show used a handful of animation techniques; 3D was used for the vehicles, the humans are live actors filmed in front of a green screen, the backgrounds are live model sets, and the 3D characters were animated with facial performance capture and joysticks. Voice actress Mary Kay Bergman provided the original voices of Jay Jay, Savannah, and Revvin' Evan. After her death in 1999, she was replaced by Debi Derryberry and Donna Cherry.

In 2005, new episodes were produced featuring additional characters, including the red Latina monoplane Lina. Each episode begins with a Jay Jay's Mysteries segment in which Jay Jay and Lina explore things that might be mysteries to the intended age group, such as how planes fly, and how the five senses are used. The "Mysteries" segment is followed by a story that comes from the third season episodes of the series, so in effect, the new season's repackages previously broadcast content on two subchannel networks Qubo and Smile, which were both shut down (as mentioned above).

=== Revival ===
Promotional announcement image, depicting the new design of Jay Jay

A new revival of the series, titled The New Adventures of Jay Jay the Jet Plane (originally titled The New World of Jay Jay the Jet Plane) was confirmed through Trilogy Animation Group's website. The first trailer for the show released in July 2022, and at least two full episodes were briefly available online later that year, but as of September 2026, their current availability is unknown. It is likely that the project been either abandoned or put on hiatus due to no further updates since the first trailer was revealed. The characters' were fully redesigned, and made to look more cartoony, newer, and like the original late 1990s series, it was CGI-animated.

== Episodes ==
Season	Episodes	Originally released		
Season	Episodes	First released	Last released	Network
1	12	November 2, 1998	December 21, 1998	TLC
2	14	January 4, 1999	January 21, 1999	TLC
3	14	June 11, 2001	July 20, 2001	PBS
4	10	September 5, 2005	November 25, 2005	PBS

== Characters ==
In the 3D-animated/live-action television series, the planes and ground vehicles are 3D characters, while the humans are live-action actors.

Relationship words for the airplane characters refer to being in loco parentis for purposes of upbringing, and education, not to biological parenthood. It is stated that the airplane characters were made in factories.

=== Young planes ===
- Jay Jay (voiced by Mary Kay Bergman in the first two seasons, Debi Derryberry in the third season and revival, and Donna Cherry in Jay Jay's Mysteries) is a small "reddish" brown (early five episodes of the pilot series only)/"ultramarine" blue-colored jet plane and the titular main protagonist of the series.
- Tracy (voiced by Gina Ribisi in the first two seasons and Sandy Fox in the third season, Jay Jay's Mysteries and revival) is a small purple / pink-colored African-Caribbean jet plane who is Jay Jay's best friend/twin sister and acts as a sister figure. She has normal hearing, but understands American Sign Language very well.
- Snuffy (voiced by Gina Ribisi in the first two seasons and Sandy Fox in the third season, Jay Jay's Mysteries and revival) is a small lime green / yellow (revival) propeller-driven monoplane who is good friends with Jay Jay and Tracy. He is equipped for skywriting. In "Snuffy Discovers the Ocean", he dreams that he is swimming underwater in the ocean.
- Herky (voiced by Mary Kay Bergman in the first two seasons, Debi Derryberry in the third season, and Donna Cherry in Jay Jay's Mysteries) is a small fluent yellow-colored Latino Russian-accented helicopter. In the pilot series, he spoke with a stutter, while in the 3D series, he rolls his "R"s whenever he speaks, and often pronounces stressed "er" as long vocalic "r" ([ɹ̩]), e.g. "I'm Herky" as [aɪm hɹ̩ːˈkǐ], with a strong, high-rising pitch accent on the last "-y". Herky has skids, and is the only member of the kid group to be shown as incapable of taxiing on the ground.
- Lina (voiced by Ashley Whittaker) is a red-colored Spanish-speaking monoplane from Mexico and Old Oscar's niece. She serves as the supporting character of the Jay Jay's Mysteries segments.
- Ricky Rescue (voiced by Josh Keaton) is a yellow and red-colored helicopter who appears in the revival and acts as an older brother figure. He is Herky's twin brother.

=== Adult planes ===
- Big Jake (voiced by Chuck Morgan in the first two seasons and Michael Donovan in the third season) is a dark gray/slate blue (revival) propeller-driven transport plane who acts as a fatherly role model to the young planes. He is the biggest, strongest and second-oldest plane in the fleet.
- Savannah (voiced by Mary Kay Bergman in the first two seasons and Debi Derryberry in the third season) is a silver-colored/light violet-colored (revival) Southern-accented supersonic jet who acts as a motherly role model to the young planes. She is the fastest plane in the fleet. She was built in Savannah, Georgia, hence her name.
- Old Oscar (voiced by Chuck Morgan in the first two seasons and Michael Donovan in the third season, and Jay Jay's Mysteries) is an elderly gray (pilot series only)/emerald green-colored biplane who acts as a grandfather figure. He is the first, oldest and wisest plane in the fleet.
- Montana (voiced by Donna Cherry) is a purple-colored hat-wearing propeller-driven safari plane from the Rockies who is exclusively in 3D and seen two times in Jay Jay's Mysteries.

=== Ground vehicles ===
Both of these ground vehicle characters are exclusively in 3D.

- Revvin' Evan (voiced by Mary Kay Bergman in the first two seasons, Debi Derryberry in the third season, and Donna Cherry in Jay Jay's Mysteries) is a red fire engine and is the cousin of Tuffy.
- Tuffy (voiced by Sandy Fox) is the Eurasian/mixed cousin of Revvin' Evan who is a confidential blue and orange tow truck. She has a speech impediment.

=== Humans ===
- Brenda Blue (played by Eve Whittle in the US and Vanessa Stacey in the UK) is a woman in blue clothing and usually wears either a red or light blue cap, as well as a pair of red high top Converse shoes. She is in charge of the airport after E.Z. O'Malley retired, and is the airplane mechanic. Brenda communicates with the planes by a portable two-way radio from the ground.
- E.Z. O'Malley (played by Brian Nahas in the US) is the British-American founder of E.Z. Airlines, and his cousins are Grumpy O'Malley, Pierre O'Malley (from Europe) and Tex O'Malley (from the South).
- Miss Lee is a deaf and silent librarian at Tarrytown Library who knows American Sign Language.
- Mrs. Blue is Brenda Blue's mother, who sometimes visits Tarrytown Airport.

== Broadcast and home media ==
Jay Jay the Jet Plane premiered on The Learning Channel as part of the Ready Set Learn block. Later, it aired on PBS Kids beginning June 11, 2001, with reruns until May 31, 2009. It aired on PBS Kids Sprout (now Universal Kids) from September 26, 2005 until September 2, 2008.

From 2012 until 2014, it aired in Spanish on Telemundo as part of "MiTelemundo". In 2021, it also aired on Qubo for a short time until Scripps' closure and on Smile until its closure on January 12, 2025. Outside of the series' home country, it aired on Channel 5, Discovery Kids, Tiny Pop, and S4C's Cyw block in the UK, Canal+ and Piwi in France, Discovery Kids in Latin America, TV Cultura in Brazil, and Nickelodeon in the Middle East.

In the early to mid-2000s, Sony Pictures Home Entertainment (formerly Columbia TriStar Home Entertainment) released the series on both VHS and DVD. Later, two Jay Jay's Mysteries episodes were released on DVD by PBS Home Video (distributed by Paramount Home Entertainment) in 2007.

Religion-based Tommy Nelson also released the series with a new dub on both VHS and DVD.

In 2019, Yippee TV became the sole streaming service of Jay Jay the Jet Plane.

== Reception ==
Common Sense Media gave the series a four out of five stars, saying, "Parents need to know that this series offers young fans life lessons such as valuing friends, overcoming shyness, and learning to like yourself. Kids will enjoy the often funny antics of 6-year-old Jay Jay and his friends. Don't be surprised if you catch your preschooler singing along with the show's simple songs."

Retrospective viewers have noted that the character designs for the show often fall into the uncanny valley, and the show is often the subject of ironic memes.
