= Robert Ellis (mathematician) =

American mathematician

Robert Mortimer Ellis
- Born: September 16, 1926; Cleveland, Ohio, US
- Died: December 6, 2013 (aged 87)
- Known for: Ellis semigroup of a dynamical system; Ellis action of a dynamical system
- Scientific career
- Fields: Mathematics
- Doctoral advisor: Walter Gottschalk

Robert Mortimer Ellis (1926–2013) was an American mathematician, specializing in topological dynamics.

Ellis grew up in Philadelphia, served briefly in the U.S. Army, and then studied at the University of Pennsylvania, where he received his Ph.D. in 1953. He was a postdoc at the University of Chicago from 1953 to 1955. He was at Pennsylvania State University from 1955 to 1957 an assistant professor and from 1957 to 1963 an associate professor and at Wesleyan University from 1963 to 1967 a full professor. At the University of Minnesota he was a full professor from 1967 to 1995, when he retired as professor emeritus.

He developed an algebraic approach to topological dynamics, leading to a strengthening with an alternate proof of the Furstenberg structure theorem. He was the author or coauthor of about 40 research publications. In the year of his retirement, a conference was held in his honor at the University of Minnesota on April 5 and 6 1995; the conference proceedings were published in 1998 by the American Mathematical Society (AMS). He was elected a Fellow of the AMS in 2012.

Ellis was predeceased by his wife. Upon his death he was survived by a grandchild, a daughter, and his son David, a professor of mathematics at Beloit College and a long-time collaborator with his father.
