= James G. Randall =

American historian (1881–1953)

- Born: James Garfield Randall; June 4, 1881; Indianapolis, Indiana, U.S.
- Died: February 20, 1953 (aged 71)
- Education: Princeton University (BA); University of Chicago (PhD)
- Occupation: Historian
- Awards: Bancroft Prize (1956)

James Garfield Randall (June 4, 1881 in Indianapolis, Indiana – February 20, 1953) was an American historian specializing in Abraham Lincoln and the era of the American Civil War. He taught at the University of Illinois, (1920–1950), where David Herbert Donald was one of his students and continued his work.

Born in Indiana and named after U.S. President James A. Garfield, Randall obtained a B.A. from Princeton University (1903) and a Ph.D. in history from the University of Chicago (1912). Randall was known for his systematic, scientific methodology based on thorough study of primary sources, his mastery of constitutional issues, and his neutrality regarding North and South. His four-volume biography of Abraham Lincoln remains a major resource for scholars. He was president of the Mississippi Valley Historical Association 1939–1940. His wife Ruth Painter Randall wrote Mary Lincoln: Biography of a Marriage (1953). His The Civil War and Reconstruction (1937) was for many years the most important history of the era.

Randall, a devout Methodist who was horrified by the carnage of World War I, believed that the Civil War was a terrible mistake, caused by the failure of the political system to find a compromise. It was a "needless war," an interpretation that won widespread assent before World War II. Along with Avery Craven, Randall, watching the rise of fascism in Europe, concluded that the American Civil War did not emerge from the conflicting material interests of economic classes, as Charles A. Beard has said. Instead, Randall believed it was brought about by fanatics, like the abolitionists in the North and the Fire-Eaters in the South. These fanatics, with very little material at stake, raced each other into war.

Randall argued in Civil War and Reconstruction that the war "could have been avoided, supposing of course that something more of statesmanship, moderation, and understanding, and something less of professional patrioteering, slogan-making, face-saving, political clamoring, and propaganda, had existed on both sides." But such had not been the case. In Randall's view, extremists in both sections emerged as villains, the abolitionist radicals worst of all. "Reforming zeal, in those individual leaders in whom it became most vociferous and vocal, was often unrelieved by wisdom, toleration, tact, and the sense of human values.... It was a major cause of the conflict itself." That is, minority elements inflamed sectional passions to a point where compromise, which might have been brought about by sensible and responsible men, became impossible.

== Awards ==
- 1956 Bancroft Prize

== Books ==
- Randall, James G. Constitutional Problems under Lincoln (1926)
- Randall, James G. The Civil War and Reconstruction (1937) classic textbook (revised by David Donald, 1961).
- James G. Randall. Lincoln the President (4 vols.), 1945–1955; reprint 2000. Subtitles: Springfield to Gettysburg (vols. 1 and 2), Midstream (vol. 3), Last Full Measure (vol. 4).
- Current, Richard N., ed. Mr. Lincoln. New York: Dodd, Mead, 1957. "Incorporates those parts of ... [the four-volume study, Lincoln, the President] which deal primarily with Lincoln the man and with his personal relationships."
- Randall, James G. Lincoln and the South (1946).
- Randall, James G. Lincoln, the Liberal Statesman (1947).
- Randall, James G. Living with Lincoln, and Other Essays (1949)
- Randall, James G. The Divided Union (1961)

== About Randall ==
- Thomas J. Pressly, Americans Interpret Their Civil War (1954; 1962 with a new introduction by the author)
- Young, James Harvey. "Randall's Lincoln: An Academic Scholar's Biography." Journal of the Abraham Lincoln Association 1998 19(2): 1–13. ISSN 0898-4212.
