= Annita Tuller =

American mathematician

Annita Tuller (also known under her married name Annita Levine, December 30, 1910 – August 29, 1994) was an American mathematician known for her 1967 textbook A Modern Introduction to Geometries. She was a professor at Lehman College in the City University of New York system.

== Early life and education ==
Tuller was born in Brooklyn, New York City, on December 30, 1910 to a family of Russian immigrants; her father was a jeweler. She went to public schools in Brooklyn, graduating from Erasmus Hall High School when she was 14 years old, and beginning her studies at Hunter College in the same year. She graduated from Hunter College in 1929, and became a graduate student at Bryn Mawr College, working there with Anna Johnson Pell Wheeler and earning a master's degree in 1930.

She worked as an instructor at Hunter College for a year, before returning to New York City as a high school mathematics teacher at William Cullen Bryant High School in Queens. Wheeler had encouraged her to continue her graduate work and earn a doctorate, and in 1935 she returned to Bryn Mawr, completing a Ph.D. there in 1937. Her dissertation, The Measure of Transitive Geodesics on Certain Three Dimensional Manifolds, concerned differential geometry and was supervised by Gustav A. Hedlund.

== Academic career and later life ==
With her doctorate, Tuller rejoined the Hunter College faculty in 1937, taking a position previously held by Miriam Becker. She married Morris Levine (1912–1983), a newspaper manager, in 1938; they had two daughters. Although going by the name "Annita Levine" socially, she continued to use her "Tuller" surname professionally. She became an assistant professor in 1949, associate professor in 1961, and full professor in 1968. By this time she was teaching at the Bronx campus of Hunter College, which in that year separated from Hunter College to form Lehman College; she continued as a professor at Lehman College, until retiring as professor emerita in 1971.

In her retirement, Tuller moved to Cupertino, California. She died there on August 29, 1994. The Professor Annita Tuller Prize, a student award at Lehman College, is named for her.

== Book ==
Tuller was the author of the book A Modern Introduction to Geometries, an undergraduate-level textbook on non-Euclidean geometry. It was published by the D. Van Nostrand Company in 1967.
