= Parachute Express =

American band

- Genres: Children's music, comedy
- Years active: 1984-2011
- Labels: Walt Disney; Trio Lane
- Past members: Rick Cunha; Donald "Donny" Becker; Janice Hubbard; Stephen Michael Schwartz

Parachute Express was an American band of three California-based entertainers who performed, wrote, and produced music for children. Members were Stephen Michael Schwartz, Janice Hubbard, and Donny Becker. The group gained national prominence as recording artists for Gymboree Play & Music, Walt Disney Records, and Trio Lane Records. Parachute Express sang the theme song to the popular television series Jay Jay the Jet Plane and have been seen on Nickelodeon's television shows Nick Jr. Rocks and Disney's Kaleidoscope Concerts. Their music was featured in over 550 Gymboree franchises throughout the world, as well as in preschools, daycare centers, and diverse informal education programs. Parachute Express created a total of 12 albums.

== History ==
In the early 1990s, Parachute Express released six albums as part of Walt Disney Records’ Music Box Artist Series. In 1995, the trio formed its own label, Trio Lane Records. Many of their albums have won national awards including NAPPA awards, the Film Advisory Board Award, an Indie Award, a Toy of The Year Award, and several times the Parents' Choice Gold Award.

Their long list of honors further included featured performers at the 42nd and 43rd Presidential Inaugural Festivities, performing their "poetic anthem" We The Children. This song was included in the Presidential library by then First Lady Hillary Clinton. Parachute Express performed half a dozen times at the Annual Easter Egg Hunt on the lawn of the White House.

Their video Come Sing With Us! won the Parents Choice Video Award and an International Monitor Award. Parachute Express have been voted "Best Group" by the American Academy of Children's Entertainment. In 2010 and 2011, Parachute Express toured China, performing in Nanjing, Shanghai, Beijing, Tianjin, Guangzhou, and Shenzhen. The group disbanded in late 2011.

== Discography ==
=== Albums ===
- Feel the Music (1991)
- Circle of Friends (1991)
- Happy to Be Here (1991)
- Shakin' It! (1992)
- Over Easy (1992)
- Sunny Side Up (1992)
- Friends, Forever Friends (1996)
- Who's Got A Hug? (1997)
- Dr. Looney's Remedy (1998)
- Don't Blink (2005)

=== Song collections ===
- Gymbo's Play and Pretend Favorites (2007)
- It's a Gymboree Party! (2007)

=== Singles ===
- Dr. Looney's Remedy (1995)
- The Coming of December (2005)

=== Tracks in compilations ===
- Disney's Music Box: Disney's Spotlight (1992): Smooth Movin' Boogie Express
- The Man Who Ran Away with the Moon (1992): Smooth Movin' Boogie Express
- Pocahontas: The Enchanted Songs (1995)
- Exercise Party: Stretchin' and Jumpin' Songs for Young Children (2003): Can You Show Us; Reach Up High
- Hear and Gone in 60 Seconds: One Minute Songs by an Awesome Array of Award Winning Artists (2003): Alphabet Soup
- Jay Jay the Jet Plane: 24 Fun and Inspirational Stories for Kids (2003): Jay Jay the Jet Plane theme song
- Jay Jay the Jet Plane: 12 Fun and Inspirational Stories for Kids (2004): Jay Jay the Jet Plane theme song
- Songs for Little Boys: Trains, Cowboys, Pirates and More! (2004): I Like Trucks
- Songs for Little Princesses: Ballerinas, Best Friends, Dressing Up and More! (2004): Polka Dots, Checks and Stripes; Dress Up Queen
- Dance Party: Movin' and Groovin' Songs for Young Children (2006): Don't Blink; Dance, Puppet, Dance
- Favorite Lullabies: 15 Gentle Songs to Ease Your Baby to Sleep (2006): Good Night Moon
- Classic Animal Songs (2007): Me and My Dog
- Kindergarten Prep: Songs to Get Your Child Ready to Learn (2008): Tie a Bow; Red Means Stop

== Videos ==
- 1989 - Live In Concert (Gymboree)
- 1995 - Come Sing With Us! (Disney)

== Awards ==
- 1991 - Parents' Choice for Feel the Music
- 1995 - Parents' Choice Video Award for Come Sing With Us!
- 1995 - International Monitor Award in the category Best Electronic Effects for Come Sing With Us!
- 1998 - National Association of Parenting Publications of America (NAPPA) Gold Award for Doctor Looney's Remedy
- 1999 - Best Group Award by the American Academy of Children's Entertainment
- 1999 - Indie Award in the category Best Children's Album for Doctor Looney's Remedy
- 2005 - Creative Child Magazine's Toy of the Year Award for Don't Blink
- 2005 - NAPPA Gold Award for Don't Blink
- 2005 - Parents Choice Gold Award for Don't Blink
- 2008 - NAPPA Gold Award for It's a Gymboree Party

== In popular culture ==
- Emma Stone mentioned the Parachute Express song "Polka Dots, Checks, and Stripes" as the inspiration for her outfit at the 87th Annual Academy Awards Nominee Luncheon.
- The documentary Not Just a Goof begins with the filmmakers watching "Dr. Looney's Remedy", since the video was shown before the VHS copy of A Goofy Movie.
