= Nira Dyn =

Israeli mathematician

- נירה דין
- Born: 1942 (age 83–84)

Academic background
- Education: Weizmann Institute of Science
- Thesis: Optimal and Minimum Norm Approximations to Linear Functionals in Hilbert Spaces, and their application to Numerical Integration (1970)
- Doctoral advisor: Philip Rabinowitz

Academic work
- Discipline: Applied mathematics
- Sub-discipline: Geometry
- Institutions: Tel Aviv University

Nira (Richter) Dyn (Hebrew: נירה דין; born 1942) is an Israeli mathematician who studied geometric modeling, subdivision surfaces, approximation theory, and image compression. She is a professor emeritus of applied mathematics at Tel Aviv University, and has been called a "pioneer and leading researcher in the subdivision community".

== Education and career ==
Dyn earned a bachelor's degree from the Technion – Israel Institute of Technology in 1965. She went on to graduate study at the Weizmann Institute of Science, where she earned a master's degree in 1967 and completed her doctorate in 1970. Her dissertation, Optimal and Minimum Norm Approximations to Linear Functionals in Hilbert Spaces, and their application to Numerical Integration, was supervised by Philip Rabinowitz. After postdoctoral research in the Institute of Fundamental Studies at the University of Rochester, she joined the Tel Aviv faculty in 1972, and retired in 2010.

== Recognition ==
Dyn was an invited speaker at the 2006 International Congress of Mathematicians, in the section on numerical analysis and scientific computing.

== Books ==
Dyn is the author of:

- Stochastic Models in Biology (as Nira Richter-Dyn, with Narendra S. Goel, Academic Press, 1974)
- Approximation of Set-valued Functions: Adaptation of Classical Approximation Operators (with Elza Farkhi and Alona Mokhov, Imperial College Press, 2014)
