= Walter Gottschalk =

American mathematician

Walter Helbig Gottschalk (November 3, 1918 – February 15, 2004) was an American mathematician, one of the founders of topological dynamics.

== Biography ==
Gottschalk was born in Lynchburg, Virginia, on November 3, 1918, and moved to Salem, Virginia as a child. His father, Carl Gottschalk, was a German immigrant who worked as a machinist and later owned several small businesses in Salem; his younger brother, Carl W. Gottschalk, became a notable medical researcher.

Gottschalk did both his undergraduate studies and graduate studies at the University of Virginia, finishing with a Ph.D. in 1944 under the supervision of Gustav A. Hedlund. After graduating, he joined the faculty of the University of Pennsylvania, and was chair of the Pennsylvania mathematics department from 1954 to 1958. In the academic year 1947/1948 he was a visiting scholar at the Institute for Advanced Study. At Pennsylvania, his doctoral students included Philip Rabinowitz, who became known for his work in numerical analysis, and Robert Ellis, who became known for his work on topological dynamics. Gottschalk moved to Wesleyan University in 1963; at Wesleyan, he also served two terms as chair before retiring in 1982. He died on February 15, 2004, in Providence, Rhode Island, where he had lived since his retirement.

== Contributions ==
Gottschalk and his advisor Gustav Hedlund wrote the 1955 monograph Topological Dynamics. Other research contributions of Gottschalk include the first study of surjunctive groups and a short proof of the De Bruijn–Erdős theorem on coloring infinite graphs.

As well as being a research mathematician, Gottschalk also put on two exhibits of mathematical sculptures in the 1960s.

== Awards and honors ==
Gottschalk was a fellow of the American Association for the Advancement of Science.

== Selected publications ==
- Gottschalk, W. H. (1951), "Choice functions and Tychonoff's theorem", Proceedings of the American Mathematical Society, 2 (1): 172, doi:10.2307/2032641, JSTOR 2032641, MR 0040376.
- Gottschalk, Walter Helbig; Hedlund, Gustav Arnold (1955), Topological dynamics, American Mathematical Society Colloquium Publications, vol. 36, Providence, R. I.: American Mathematical Society, ISBN 9780821874691, MR 0074810.
- Gottschalk, Walter (1973), "Some general dynamical notions", Recent Advances in Topological Dynamics (Proc. Conf. Topological Dynamics, Yale Univ., New Haven, Conn., 1972; in honor of Gustav Arnold Hedlund), Lecture Notes in Math., vol. 318, Berlin, New York: Springer-Verlag, pp. 120–125, doi:10.1007/BFb0061728, ISBN 978-3-540-06187-8, MR 0407821.
