= Keightley =

Keightley (/ˈkiːtli, ˈkaɪtli/) is an English surname.

== Notable people named Keightley ==
- Archibald Keightley (1859–1930), member of the Theosophical Society.
- Bill Keightley (1926–2008), equipment manager for the University of Kentucky men's basketball team
- Charles Keightley (1901–1974), British general
- David Keightley (1932-2017), historian of early China
- Edwin W. Keightley (1843–1926), US politician
- Lisa Keightley (born 1971), Australian cricketer
- Thomas Keightley (historian) (1789–1872), historian
- Thomas Keightley (official) (1650–1719), official in Ireland
- Archibald Keightley Nicholson (1871–1937), stained glass maker
