= Alan M. Friedlander =

American marine and fisheries ecologist

Alan Friedlander is an American marine ecologist and fisheries scientist focusing on protecting ocean habitats and incorporating traditional indigenous knowledge into contemporary conservation management. Friedlander was the lead author of the first study to describe inverted biomass pyramids in un-fished coral reef ecosystems. He has authored or contributed to over 400 publications, book chapters, and articles that have been cited over 15,000 times. As chief scientist for National Geographic's Pristine Seas project, Friedlander has led over 40 expeditions resulting in the creation of 26 new marine reserves protecting more than 6.5 million square kilometres (2.5×10^{6} sq mi) of remote and exceptional ocean habitats.

== Education ==
Alan Marc Friedlander was born in Baltimore, Maryland, in November 1958. Friedlander received his B.S. in Biology from Roanoke College in 1980. After serving two years in the Peace Corps in Tonga, working with local fishing communities, he went on to receive an M.S. in Oceanography from Old Dominion University in 1987. Following that, he worked in the US Virgin Islands, first as a fisheries biologist with the territorial government and then as a marine biologist with the Virgin Islands National Park. He then went on to obtain a Ph.D. in Zoology (Marine Biology) from the University of Hawaiʻi at Mānoa in 1996, and then conducted post-doctoral research with the National Oceanic and Atmospheric Administration in Pacific Grove, California.

== Work ==
Over the past 40 years, Friedlander has spent more than 12,000 hours underwater – from coral reefs to the poles and to depths of thousands of meters – to better understand the functioning of marine ecosystems. While in Tonga, he learned the value of a healthy ocean to indigenous communities, which sparked his interest in traditional ecological knowledge and its importance in contemporary marine resource management. His master's research focused on fish aggregating devices in Puerto Rico and artificial reefs in the Chesapeake Bay. His Ph.D. research had examined the role of habitat complexity and ocean processes in structuring coral reef fish assemblages. His work comparing the Northwestern Hawaiian Islands' reef ecosystems to those of the main Hawaiian Islands found that remote areas without people had far greater populations of large predators (e.g., sharks and jacks) compared to inhabited areas. His surveys in the Northern Line Islands revealed a similar trend, and subsequent expeditions across the globe have corroborated these findings.

Friedlander has contributed to ocean ecosystem management in Hawaii for decades, assisting in the regulation of fisheries, assessing the efficacy of marine protected areas, and studying the effects of fishing and other anthropogenic influences on island ecosystems.

During the COVID-19 pandemic, Friedlander surveyed Molokini Shoal Marine Protected Area (MPA), one of the most heavily visited MPAs in the world. He found that in the absence of people, fish recovered quickly. However, once people returned, fish populations returned to their pre-COVID levels.

Since 2013, Friedlander has been the Chief Scientist for National Geographic's Pristine Seas project, supporting global communities and governmental goals to protect 30% of the oceans by 2030. Some projects Dr. Friedlander has been involved in include: helping to establish the Nazca Ridge–Desventuradas Islands MPA in Peru and the Juan Fernández Islands MPA in Chile, battling Chilean salmon farming on the ancestral lands of the Kawésqar people, protecting kelp forests off Tierra del Fuego in Argentina, opposing shark culling in Western Australia, and tagging sharks to track their behavior in Palmyra Atoll. Friedlander is also a researcher at the Hawaii Institute of Marine Biology at the University of Hawaiʻi at Mānoa.

== Awards ==
- 1997 National Research Council Postdoctoral Fellowship
- 2002 Hawaiʻi Audubon Society Program Award
- 2014 Environmental Hero Award (along with the Pristine Seas program) from the Environmental Media Association
- 2016 Crystal Compass National Award (along with the Pristine Seas Program) from the Russian Geographical Society

== Memberships ==
- Royal Geographical Society fellow
- Explorers Club fellow
- Global Ocean Refuge System
- The Nature Conservancy of Hawaii Board of Trustees
