= Carl W. Gottschalk =

American physician and physiologist (1922–1997

- Born: April 28, 1922; Salem, Virginia, USA
- Died: October 15, 1997 (aged 75)
- Education: Roanoke College, University of Virginia
- Known for: Kidney physiology, history of kidney research
- Relatives: Walter Gottschalk (brother)
- Awards: Homer W. Smith Award of the American Society of Nephrology, David M. Hume Award of the National Kidney Foundation
- Scientific career
- Fields: Physiology
- Institutions: University of North Carolina at Chapel Hill

Carl William Gottschalk (April 28, 1922 – October 15, 1997) was the Kenan Professor and Distinguished Research Professor of Medicine at the University of North Carolina at Chapel Hill. Gottschalk made important discoveries about the function of the kidneys, and helped set government policies that provided dialysis to patients with kidney failure.

== Biography ==
Born in Salem, Virginia in 1922, he graduated Phi Beta Kappa from Roanoke College in 1942, and attended a wartime medical school program at the University of Virginia. In 1945, Gottschalk was for six years a research fellow at Harvard University and an intern at Massachusetts General Hospital. He then joined the University of North Carolina at Chapel Hill as cardiology fellow and instructor in the School of Medicine; he remained at UNC until his retirement in 1992. He died on October 15, 1997.

Gottschalk's older brother, Walter Gottschalk, was a professor of mathematics at the University of Pennsylvania and Wesleyan University.

== Research and publications ==
Throughout his career, Gottschalk published extensively about the kidney and about the history of kidney research. He is particularly known for his work using micropuncture techniques to study the kidney's ability to concentrate urine, and for the theory of countercurrent multiplication explaining this ability.

== Health policy ==
In 1967, Gottschalk chaired a U.S. government committee that recommended government support for kidney transplants and artificial kidney machines for patients with kidney failure. His efforts led to Medicare funding of dialysis for these patients, now provided to hundreds of thousands of patients. He also chaired another committee in 1987 concerned with medical ethics.

== Awards and honors ==
Gottschalk was named Kenan Professor of Medicine and Physiology by UNC in 1969. He was elected to the American Academy of Arts and Sciences in 1970 and the National Academy of Sciences in 1975, and was from 1976 to 1977 the president of the American Society of Nephrology. He was also awarded an honorary doctorate by Roanoke College in 1966, the Homer W. Smith Award of the American Society of Nephrology in 1970, and the David M. Hume Award of the National Kidney Foundation in 1976. On his retirement in 1992, he was named Distinguished Research Professor of Medicine and Physiology; in the same year Roanoke College named him one of 150 Sesquicentennial Distinguished Alumni. After his death, annual lectures in his name were founded both by UNC and by the American Physiological Society.
