= Eve Whittle =

American actress and child psychologist (born 1967)

- Born: Evelyn Whittle; August 5, 1967 (age 59)
- Other name: Evelyn Whittle Keller
- Occupations: Actress, child psychologist
- Years active: 1998–present

Evelyn "Eve" Whittle (born August 5, 1967) is an American actress and child psychologist best known for her TV role of the earnest and enthusiastic airport supervisor/technician Brenda Blue on the PBS Kids live action/CGI series Jay Jay the Jet Plane. Brenda is noted for her formulaic enunciation of words.

== Biography ==
Whittle is a program director for Kids on Stage, a Los Angeles-based theatrical program for children. It was her blue jumpsuit-clad character on Jay Jay that has made her a household name with pre-schoolers (and their parents). She is known for her crisp manner of speaking to the talking airplanes, and this makes Whittle—who uses her married name, Evelyn Whittle Keller, when not acting—an intriguing counterpoint to the childlike talking planes.

Whittle is known for her ability to whistle in strange and haunting ways, using her own whistling as a special effect in Jay Jay's Mysteries.

Whittle is a graduate of Roanoke College (BA) and Antioch University (MA). She lives in Culver City, California.

== See also ==
- Jay Jay the Jet Plane
