= Ruth Randall =

Ruth Painter Randall
- Born: Ruth Painter; November 1, 1892; Salem, Virginia, United States
- Died: January 22, 1971 (aged 78); Urbana, Illinois, United States
- Resting place: Mount Hope Cemetery and Mausoleum, Urbana, Illinois, United States
- Education: Roanoke College
- Alma mater: Indiana University
- Occupation: Biographer
- Spouse: James G. Randall
- Writing career
- Language: English
- Genre: American history
- Subjects: Abraham Lincoln; Mary Todd Lincoln

Ruth Painter Randall (1892-1971) was an American biographer who specialized in the lives of Abraham Lincoln, Mary Todd Lincoln and their immediate family. She also wrote young adult books about early American women.

== Early life and education ==
Ruth Painter was born in 1892 in Salem, Virginia. She earned her bachelor's degree in 1913 from Roanoke College and a master's degree from Indiana University in English in 1914. Painter married James G. Randall on August 21, 1917.

== Career as a historian ==
In the 1940s, Randall started assisting her husband with research for his biography about Abraham Lincoln, titled Lincoln the President: From Springfield to Gettysburg. In the end, she wrote two chapters for the book, which was published in 1945. Shortly thereafter, she started working on her own book about Mary Todd Lincoln titled Mary Lincoln: Biography of a Marriage. James died in 1953.

Throughout the 1950s, Randall researched and wrote about the Lincoln family, specifically about the marriage between Lincoln and Mary Todd (The Courtship of Mr. Lincoln, 1957) and the Lincoln's children (Lincoln's Sons, 1955). Eventually, she began writing about other historical subjects, including a biography about Elmer Ellsworth and a 1960s series of children's books about historical women, specifically Mary Todd Lincoln, Elizabeth Bacon Custer, and Jessie Benton Frémont.

== Later life and legacy ==
Randall died on January 22, 1971, at Burnham City Hospital in Champaign-Urbana, Illinois.

Randall's papers and correspondence are held in the collection of the University of Illinois at Urbana-Champaign. Additional papers are held in the Library of Congress.

== Selected works ==
- Mary Lincoln : Biography of a Marriage. Boston: Little, Brown & Company (1953). ISBN 0316733598
- Lincoln's Sons. Boston: Little, Brown & Company (1955).
- I, Mary: A Biography of the Girl Who Married Abraham Lincoln. Boston: Little Brown (1959).
- Colonel Elmer Ellsworth: a biography of Lincoln's friend and first hero of the Civil War. Boston: Little Brown (1960).
- I, Varina: a Biography of the Girl Who Married Jefferson Davis and Became the First Lady of the South. Boston: Little Brown (1962)
- I, Jessie. Boston: Little Brown (1963). ISBN 9110026150
- I, Elizabeth: A Biography of the Girl Who Married General George Armstrong Custer of "Custer's Last Stand". Boston: Little Brown (1966)
