= Philip Rabinowitz (mathematician) =

American-Israeli mathematician (1926–2006)

- פיליפ רבינוביץ
- Born: August 14, 1926; Philadelphia, Pennsylvania, United States
- Died: July 21, 2006 (aged 79); Jerusalem, Israel
- Education: University of Pennsylvania
- Scientific career
- Fields: applied mathematics, numerical analysis
- Workplaces: National Bureau of Standards, Weizmann Institute of Science
- Thesis: Normal Coverings and Uniform Spaces (1951)
- Doctoral advisor: Walter Gottschalk
- Doctoral students: Nira Dyn

Philip Rabinowitz (Hebrew: פיליפ רבינוביץ; August 14, 1926 – July 21, 2006) was an American and Israeli applied mathematician. He was best known for his work in numerical analysis, including his books A First Course in Numerical Analysis with Anthony Ralston and Methods of Numerical Integration with Philip J. Davis. He was the author of numerous articles on numerical computation.

He earned his Ph.D. in 1951 under Walter Gottschalk at the University of Pennsylvania. He worked for the American National Bureau of Standards and taught at the Weizmann Institute of Science in Israel.
