= Kegley, West Virginia =

- Unincorporated community
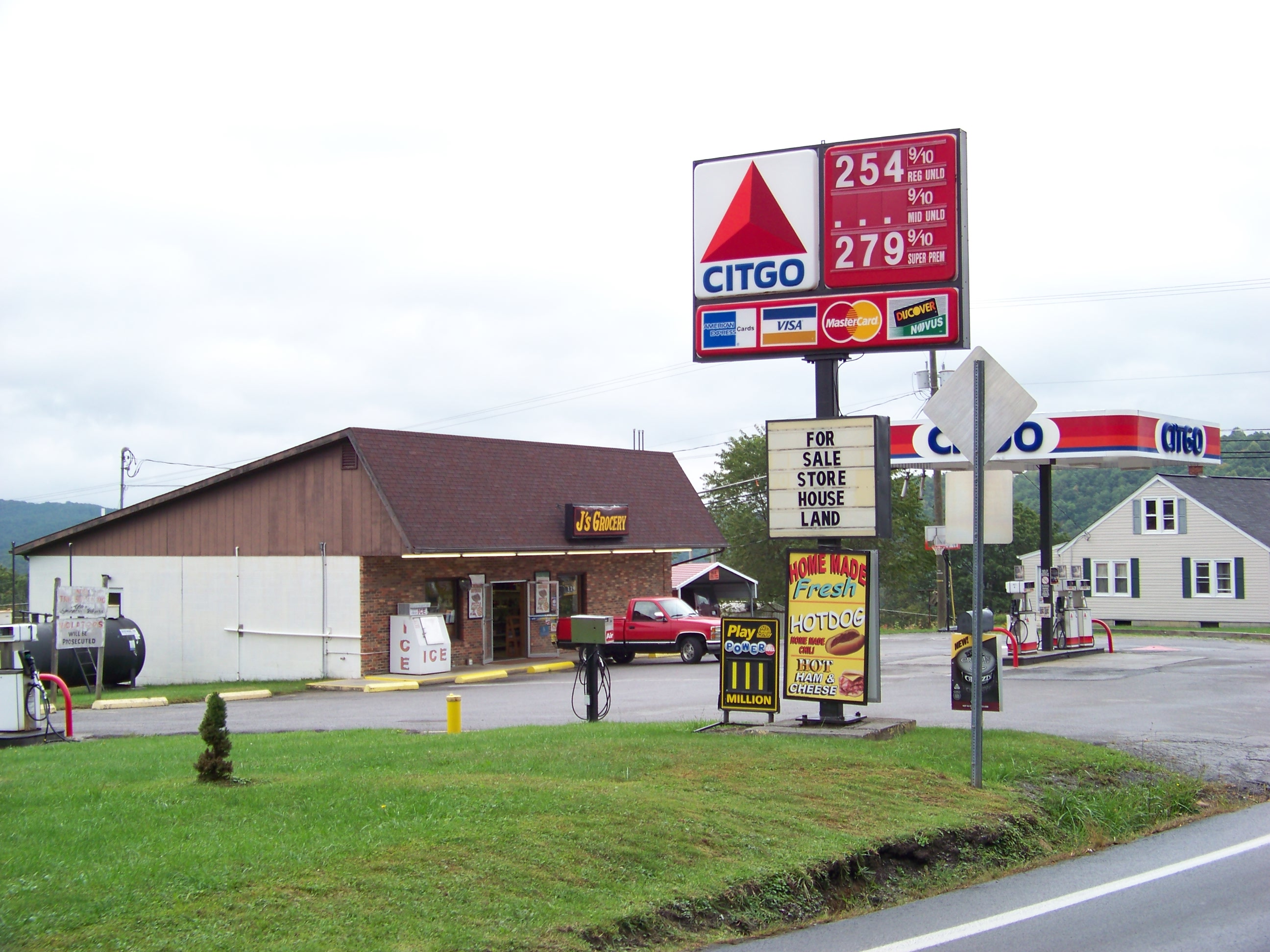
- J's Grocery

- Location within the state of West Virginia Kegley, West Virginia (the United States)
- Coordinates: 37°23′49″N 81°07′54″W
- Country: United States
- State: West Virginia
- County: Mercer
- Elevation: 2,411 ft (735 m)
- Time zone: UTC-5 (Eastern (EST))
  - Summer (DST): UTC-4 (EDT)
- ZIP code: 24731
- Area codes: 304 & 681
- GNIS feature ID: 1541113

Kegley is an unincorporated community in Mercer County, West Virginia, United States. Kegley is located along U.S. Route 19, 2.5 miles (4.0 km) northwest of Princeton. Kegley has a post office with ZIP code 24731.
