= John Pirro =

American lacrosse player and coach

John Pirro was a former lacrosse player and coach. He was a three-time first-team All-American, two-time Defender of the Year, three-time ODAC Coach of the year, and he is in the Charlottesville and Long Island Lacrosse Halls of Fame and the Roanoke College Athletic Hall of Fame. In 2011 he was announced as one of 24 finalists to be elected to the National Lacrosse Hall of Fame.

Pirro played lacrosse at Roanoke College from 1974 to 1977. During his career, he earned first team All-American status on three occasions and earned the NCAA Division II-III Defenseman of the Year Award in both 1976 and 1977. After graduation, John played for the Long Island Lacrosse Club, where he was chosen first team All-USCLA.

In 1978, the Huntington, NY native was elected to the Long Island Hall of Fame. John returned to Roanoke College in the spring of 1979 as an assistant coach to Roanoke Lacrosse legendary Coach Paul Griffin.

John assumed the head coaching role in 1982. His 1983 team advanced to the NCAA Division III National Championship game. In that same year, John was selected as the NCAA Division III National Lacrosse Coach of the Year by the Hero's Lacrosse Association. Over his five-year tenure as Roanoke's Head Lacrosse Coach his teams never lost an Old Dominion Athletic Conference game. A year after his retirement from coaching at Roanoke in 1987, Pirro was voted into the Roanoke College Athletic Hall of Fame.

Pirro was diagnosed with Huntington's disease in 2001, and died due to complications from the disease on August 13, 2013.
