= Frederick Bittle Kegley =

Frederick Bittle Kegley (Wytheville, Virginia, on July 7, 1877 - 1968) was a Virginia local historian, agricultural leader and educator. He is best known as the author of Kegley's Virginia Frontier: The Beginning of the Southwest.

== Biography ==
Born on a farm near Wytheville, Virginia, on July 7, 1877, Kegley was of German heritage, the son of Stephen A. and Sarah Elizabeth (Umberger) Kegley. He was educated at Roanoke College and the University of Pennsylvania, but returned home to manage the family farm upon the death of his father. Deeply interested in local history, Kegley edited a quarterly magazine named Mountain Empire, and he was the author of Kegley's Virginia Frontier: The Beginning of the Southwest. (1938) Upon his death, he provided for his research materials and collection of documents to be provided to Wytheville Community College, who create the "Kegley Library" as a special collection library.

Kegley was married in 1914, but the marriage produced no children. His wife Mary wrote The Wytheville Cookbook.
