= Salem, Virginia =

Independent city in Virginia, United States

Salem
- Independent city
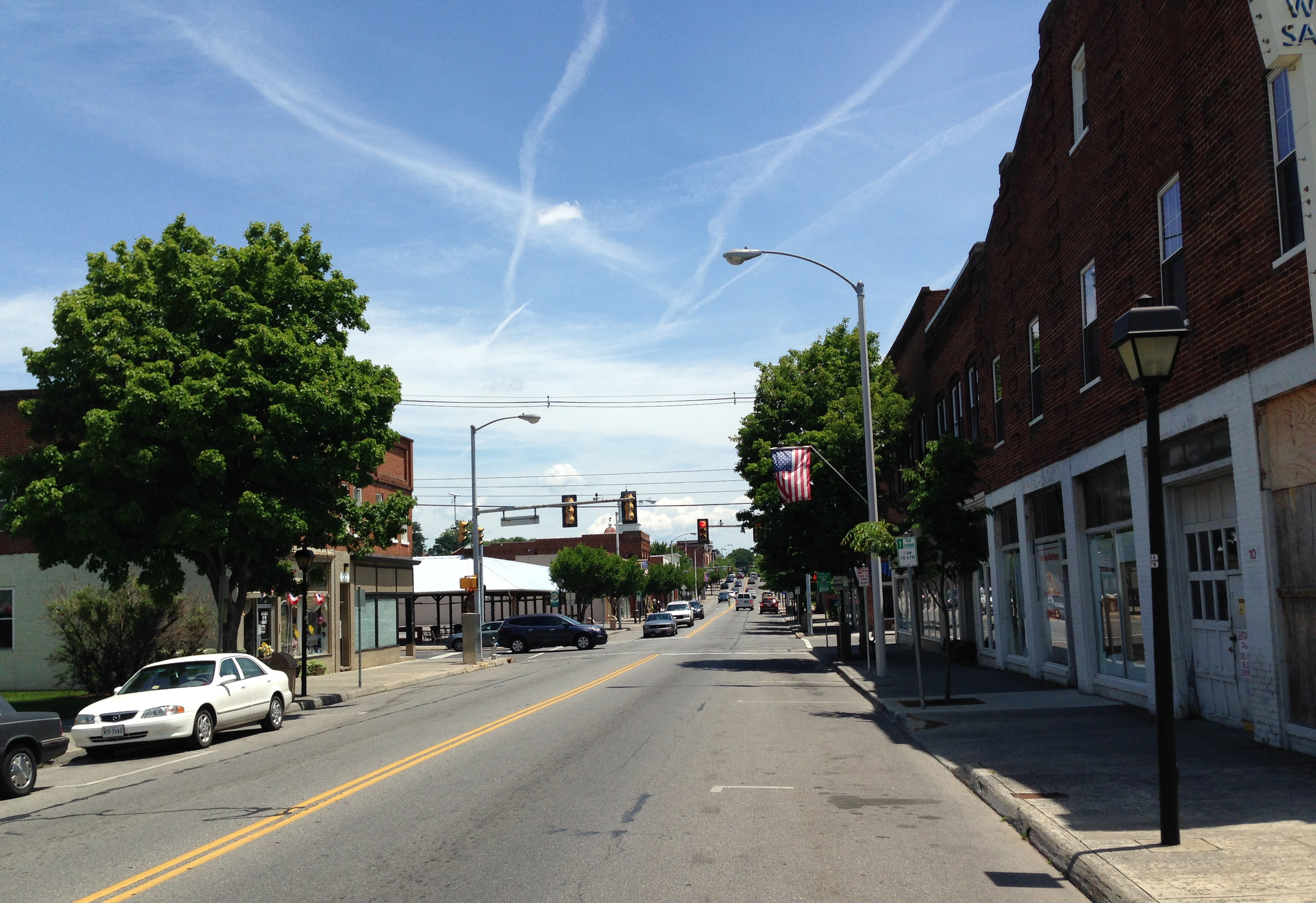
- Main Street in Salem

- Seal

- Salem's location in the Commonwealth of Virginia

- Location within Shenandoah Valley Location within Virginia Location within the United States
- Coordinates: 37°17′12″N 80°3′21″W
- Country: United States
- State: Virginia
- County: None (Independent city)
- Established: 1802

Government
  - Type: Council-Manager
  - Mayor: Renée Turk
  - Vice Mayor: Jim Wallace

Area
  - Total: 14.63 sq mi (37.88 km^{2})
  - Land: 14.52 sq mi (37.60 km^{2})
  - Water: 0.11 sq mi (0.28 km^{2})
- Elevation: 1,175.0 ft (358.14 m)

Population (2020)
  - Total: 25,346
  - Estimate (2025): 25,816 ▲
  - Density: 1,746/sq mi (674.1/km^{2})
- Time zone: UTC−5 (EST)
  - Summer (DST): UTC−4 (EDT)
- Zip Code: 24153
- Area code: 540
- FIPS code: 51-70000
- GNIS feature ID: 1498533
- Website: http://www.salemva.gov/

Salem is an independent city in the Commonwealth of Virginia. As of the 2020 census, the population was 25,346. It is the county seat of Roanoke County, although the two are separate jurisdictions. The Bureau of Economic Analysis combines the city of Salem with Roanoke County, which surrounds both Salem and the neighboring City of Roanoke, for statistical purposes. Salem has its own courthouse and sheriff's office, but shares a jail with Roanoke County, which is located in the Roanoke County Courthouse complex in Salem. The Roanoke County Sheriff's Office and Roanoke County Department of Social Services are also located within Salem, though the county administrative offices are located in unincorporated Cave Spring.

Roanoke College is located in the city. Salem is also the home to a Minor League Baseball team, the Salem RidgeYaks.

== History ==
The earliest history of Salem exists as archaeological evidence of Native American tribes from as far back as 8,000 BCE until the middle of the 18th century. Europeans first explored the area of Salem in 1671, when the Siouan-speaking Totero people had a village nearby. Explorers Thomas Batts and Robert Fallam gave the area its first recorded name: Totero Town, after this tribe, who supplied them with a guide to help with further exploration. Fort Lewis, named for General Andrew Lewis, of what is now Roanoke County, was built west of the town in 1752. Salem's Andrew Lewis Middle School (formerly Andrew Lewis High School) was named after General Lewis. Salem became a small settlement serving travelers on the Great Road (roughly the same path followed by US-11 and later Interstate 81 today) and was officially founded in 1802, receiving its charter in 1806. It is not known why the town was named Salem; the most widely accepted explanation is that it was named to honor William Bryan, a prominent citizen, who had moved from Salem, New Jersey.

Salem was attacked twice by the Union Army during the American Civil War, (including Averell's Cavalry Raid) but its Salem Flying Artillery is said to have fired the last Confederate shot at Appomattox Court House prior to Robert E. Lee's surrender.

One of the city's four elementary schools is named after African American scientist G. W. Carver. Before integration, this was the high school for African Americans in Salem. The other three elementary schools are South Salem, East Salem, & West Salem.

Salem annexed South Salem in 1953 and also an eastern tract in 1960, giving it a population of 16,058 – making it Virginia's largest town at the time. Salem officially became a city on December 31, 1967, to avoid the possibility of annexation into the city of Roanoke. Per the Virginia constitution, it was separated from Roanoke County. However, it remains the official county seat, although the Roanoke County Administrative Building is located in the Cave Spring area of the county.

Salem has been the home of two colleges. In 1847, the Virginia Institute, a boy's preparatory school, moved to Salem from Staunton. It received a college charter in 1853 and was renamed Roanoke College for the Roanoke Valley. The college is located in central Salem, one block north of Main Street. Roanoke Women's College, later named Elizabeth College, operated between 1912 and 1922. The college burned in late 1921 and did not reopen. Like Roanoke College, it was affiliated with the Evangelical Lutheran Church in America. The Elizabeth College campus is now the site of residence halls and athletic fields that belong to Roanoke College.

Salem is home to the Salem RidgeYaks, the Single-A affiliate of the Boston Red Sox.

The Amos Alonzo Stagg Bowl, the NCAA Division III Football Championship game was held at Salem Football Stadium between 1993 and 2016. Salem's success in holding that event led the NCAA to also move the NCAA Men's Division III Basketball Championship and NCAA Division III women's volleyball tournament to the Salem Civic Center and the NCAA Division II softball tournament and the NCAA Division III softball tournament to the James I. Moyer Sports Complex.

In August 2007, the Salem Football Stadium also hosted the Southwestern Virginia Educational Classic. This game is played annually in the Roanoke Valley and consists of two football teams from Historically Black Colleges and Universities. The city hosts several other statewide, regional, and national sporting events at its facilities. These events are attracted by the city's hospitality, modern facilities and overall support. Salem High School, is also known for its athletic programs, particularly the football team which has won ten state championships since 1996, and also the forensics team, which has won eighteen consecutive state championships.

== Geography ==
Salem is located at 37°17′12″N 80°3′21″W (37.286895, -80.055836).

According to the United States Census Bureau, the city has a total area of 14.5 square miles (37.6 km^{2}), of which 14.4 square miles (37.3 km^{2}) is land and 0.1 square miles (0.3 km^{2}) (0.7%) is water.

== Demographics ==
Historical population
Census	Pop.	Note	%±
1860	612		—
1870	1,355		121.4%
1880	1,759		29.8%
1890	3,279		86.4%
1900	3,412		4.1%
1910	3,849		12.8%
1920	4,159		8.1%
1930	4,833		16.2%
1940	5,737		18.7%
1950	6,823		18.9%
1960	16,058		135.4%
1970	21,982		36.9%
1980	23,958		9.0%
1990	23,756		−0.8%
2000	24,747		4.2%
2010	24,802		0.2%
2020	25,346		2.2%
2025 (est.)	25,816	▲	1.9%
U.S. Decennial Census; 1790–1960 1900–1990; 1990–2000 2010 2020

=== Racial and ethnic composition ===
Salem city, Virginia – Racial and ethnic composition Note: the US Census treats Hispanic/Latino as an ethnic category. This table excludes Latinos from the racial categories and assigns them to a separate category. Hispanics/Latinos may be of any race.
Race / Ethnicity (NH = Non-Hispanic)	Pop 1980	Pop 1990	Pop 2000	Pop 2010	Pop 2020	% 1980	% 1990	% 2000	% 2010	% 2020
White alone (NH)	22,685	22,396	22,594	21,653	20,673	94.69%	94.28%	91.30%	87.30%	81.56%
Black or African American alone (NH)	1,060	1,051	1,444	1,732	1,913	4.42%	4.42%	5.84%	6.98%	7.55%
Native American or Alaska Native alone (NH)	24	27	32	55	42	0.10%	0.11%	0.13%	0.22%	0.17%
Asian alone (NH)	74	161	241	398	534	0.31%	0.68%	0.97%	1.60%	2.11%
Native Hawaiian or Pacific Islander alone (NH)	x	x	6	6	5	x	x	0.02%	0.02%	0.02%
Other race alone (NH)	16	10	23	31	66	0.07%	0.04%	0.09%	0.12%	0.26%
Mixed race or Multiracial (NH)	x	x	202	326	1,025	x	x	0.82%	1.31%	4.04%
Hispanic or Latino (any race)	99	111	205	601	1,088	0.41%	0.47%	0.83%	2.42%	4.29%
Total	23,958	23,756	24,747	24,802	25,346	100.00%	100.00%	100.00%	100.00%	100.00%

=== 2020 census ===
As of the 2020 census, Salem had a population of 25,346 and the median age was 41.6 years. 18.8% of residents were under the age of 18 and 21.0% of residents were 65 years of age or older. For every 100 females there were 90.6 males, and for every 100 females age 18 and over there were 87.0 males age 18 and over.

100.0% of residents lived in urban areas, while 0.0% lived in rural areas.

There were 10,242 households in Salem, of which 26.6% had children under the age of 18 living in them. Of all households, 43.2% were married-couple households, 18.7% were households with a male householder and no spouse or partner present, and 31.6% were households with a female householder and no spouse or partner present. About 32.5% of all households were made up of individuals and 15.3% had someone living alone who was 65 years of age or older.

There were 11,125 housing units, of which 7.9% were vacant. The homeowner vacancy rate was 1.2% and the rental vacancy rate was 9.4%.

=== 2000 census ===
As of the census of 2000, there were 24,747 people, 9,954 households, and 6,539 families residing in the city. The population density was 1,696.4 people per square mile (655.0 people/km^{2}). There were 10,403 housing units at an average density of 713.1 units per square mile (275.3 units/km^{2}). The racial makeup of the city was 91.88% White, 5.88% African American, 0.13% Native American, 0.97% Asian, 0.02% Pacific Islander, 0.25% from other races, and 0.86% from two or more races. Hispanic or Latino of any race were 0.83% of the population.

There were 9,954 households, out of which 28.2% had children under the age of 18 living with them, 50.9% were married couples living together, 11.5% had a female householder with no husband present, and 34.3% were non-families. 29.0% of all households were made up of individuals, and 12.2% had someone living alone who was 65 years of age or older. The average household size was 2.32 and the average family size was 2.84.

In the city, the population was spread out, with 20.9% under the age of 18, 11.7% from 18 to 24, 26.7% from 25 to 44, 24.0% from 45 to 64, and 16.8% who were 65 years of age or older. The median age was 39 years. For every 100 females, there were 89.3 males. For every 100 females aged 18 and over, there were 85.5 males.

The median income for a household in the city was $38,997, and the median income for a family was $47,174. Males had a median income of $32,472 versus $23,193 for females. The per capita income for the city was $20,091. About 4.3% of families and 6.7% of the population were below the poverty line, including 7.0% of those under age 18 and 8.1% of those age 65 or over.

== Government ==
Salem is a Republican-leaning city. Since its founding, it has only supported a Democratic candidate once, when Jimmy Carter carried it by 208 votes in 1976.

United States presidential election results for Salem, Virginia
Year	Republican		Democratic		Third party(ies)	
Year	No.	%	No.	%	No.	%
1968	3,955	57.77%	1,369	20.00%	1,522	22.23%
1972	5,649	74.79%	1,744	23.09%	160	2.12%
1976	4,196	48.29%	4,404	50.68%	90	1.04%
1980	4,862	51.78%	4,091	43.57%	436	4.64%
1984	6,419	65.43%	3,347	34.12%	44	0.45%
1988	5,694	59.77%	3,760	39.47%	73	0.77%
1992	5,143	48.21%	4,028	37.75%	1,498	14.04%
1996	4,936	48.97%	4,282	42.48%	861	8.54%
2000	6,188	57.46%	4,348	40.37%	234	2.17%
2004	7,115	61.96%	4,254	37.04%	115	1.00%
2008	7,088	57.13%	5,164	41.63%	154	1.24%
2012	7,299	59.25%	4,760	38.64%	259	2.10%
2016	7,226	59.11%	4,202	34.37%	797	6.52%
2020	7,683	58.87%	5,148	39.45%	220	1.69%
2024	7,769	58.82%	5,237	39.65%	201	1.52%

Salem is governed by a five-member council. The council elects a mayor and vice mayor from among its members. The members of council are Mayor Renée Ferris Turk, Vice Mayor James "Jim" Wallace III, Byron "Randy" Foley, William "Bill" Jones, and Hunter H. Holliday.

Day-to-day operations are run by the City Manager, Chris Dorsey.

== Notable people ==
- Mark Byington, current head men's basketball coach at Vanderbilt University
- Leslie D. Carter, U.S. Army major general.
- Carl W. Gottschalk, physiologist, born in Salem
- Walter Gottschalk, mathematician, lived in Salem
- Morgan Griffith, U.S. representative, former Majority Leader of the Virginia House of Delegates
- Dennis Haley, former NFL Linebacker for the Baltimore Ravens, New York Jets and San Francisco 49ers.
- John McAfee, computer programmer and businessman.
- Walter Muir, correspondence chess player and philanthropist
- Ruth Painter Randall, biographer
- Nat Reese, former blues musician
- Billy Sample, former Major League baseball outfielder for the Texas Rangers, New York Yankees and Atlanta Braves; broadcaster and writer
- David C. Shanks, US Army major general
- Leander J. Shaw, Jr., Chief Justice of the Florida Supreme Court, was born in Salem.
- Adam Ward, photojournalist, killed on live television while reporting for WDBJ7.
- Walt Walowac, former NIBL basketball player, West Virginia Sports Hall of Fame

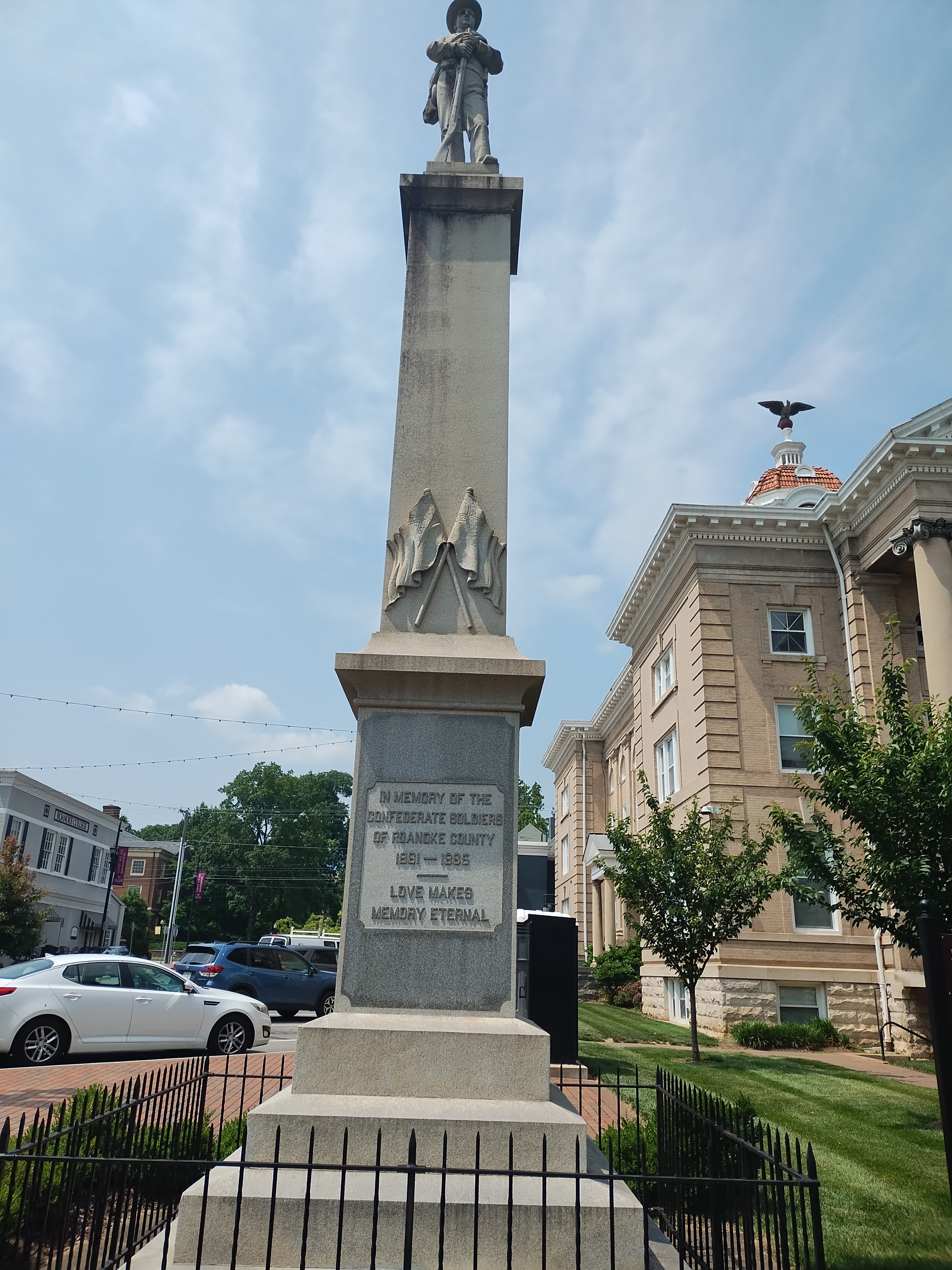
Confederate Monument outside the Old Roanoke County Courthouse

== Historical Markers ==
There are several historical markers in Salem, ranging from the Civil War to World War I and the Korean Independence Movement. One such marker, the Roanoke County Confederate Monument, lies in close proximity to the Old Roanoke County Courthouse. The monument was erected in 1909 by the Southern Cross Chapter of the United Daughters of the Confederacy to honor Roanoke's Confederate soldiers. The 28 ft granite and marble statue depicts a standing soldier atop a pedestal. Its erection date coincides with the dedication of the courthouse and with the anniversary of Jefferson Davis's birthday. The inscription reads: "In Memory of the Confederate Soldiers of Roanoke County, 1861-1865. Love Makes Memory Eternal."

Another marker honors the sacrifice of patrolman William Howard Thompson of the Salem Police Department, after whom Thompson Memorial Drive is named. Patrolman Thompson was slain while assisting his fellow officers when apprehending a suspect.

In 2022, Roanoke College dedicated a highway marker on High Street to honor Kim Kyusik (1881-1950), an influential leader in the Korean independence movement and Roanoke College graduate.

Other Salem historical markers include the East Hill Cemetery North Marker (erected in 2006 by The Citizens League of Salem) and the World War 1917-1919 Memorial, a bronze plaque honoring soldiers and sailors from Roanoke County who died during World War I (erected by Salem Post No. 19 Department of Virginia of the American Legion).

== See also ==
- National Register of Historic Places listings in Salem, Virginia
