= National Register of Historic Places listings in Roanoke County, Virginia =

Location of Roanoke County in Virginia

This is a list of the National Register of Historic Places listings in Roanoke County, Virginia.

This is intended to be a complete list of the properties and districts on the National Register of Historic Places in Roanoke County, Virginia, United States. The locations of National Register properties and districts for which the latitude and longitude coordinates are included below, may be seen in an online map.

There are 13 properties and districts listed on the National Register in the county, including 1 National Historic Landmark.

This National Park Service list is complete through NPS recent listings posted March 6, 2026.

== Current listings ==
	Name on the Register	Image	Date listed	Location	City or town	Description
1	Anderson-Doosing Farm	Anderson-Doosing Farm	August 27, 2009 (#09000666)	7474 Blacksburg Rd. 37°19′49″N 80°11′42″W	Catawba	
2	Black Horse Tavern-Bellvue Hotel and Office	Black Horse Tavern-Bellvue Hotel and Office	January 24, 2002 (#01001521)	7223-7229 Old Mountain Rd. 37°20′47″N 79°54′53″W	Hollins	
3	Blue Ridge Parkway	Blue Ridge Parkway	December 13, 2024 (#100011353)	Blue Ridge Parkway through Virginia and North Carolina; 37°15′10″N 79°52′17″W	Vinton vicinity	
4	William Byrd High School Historic District	William Byrd High School Historic District	June 12, 2017 (#100001082)	100 and 156 Highland Rd. 37°16′56″N 79°54′02″W	Vinton	
5	Roland E. Cook Elementary School	Roland E. Cook Elementary School	May 12, 2016 (#16000262)	412 S. Poplar St. 37°16′37″N 79°53′44″W	Vinton	
6	Gish Mill	Gish Mill	November 18, 2021 (#100007188)	350 Gus Nicks Blvd. 37°17′00″N 79°53′59″W	Vinton	
7	Harshbarger House	Harshbarger House	October 15, 1992 (#92001390)	316 John Richardson Rd. 37°19′19″N 79°56′15″W	Hollins	
8	Hollins College Quadrangle	Hollins College Quadrangle	November 5, 1974 (#74002145)	Hollins University campus 37°21′17″N 79°56′31″W	Hollins	
9	Johnsville Meetinghouse	Johnsville Meetinghouse	October 30, 1998 (#98001308)	8860 Johnsville Church Rd. 37°18′56″N 80°14′48″W	Catawba	
10	Old Tombstone	Old Tombstone	March 25, 1980 (#80004222)	Plantation Rd. 37°20′25″N 79°56′31″W	Hollins	
11	Pleasant Grove	Pleasant Grove	May 22, 2003 (#03000449)	4377 W. Main St. 37°16′13″N 80°08′31″W	Salem	
12	Starkey School	Starkey School	January 24, 2002 (#01001513)	6426 Merriman Rd., SW. 37°12′08″N 79°59′57″W	Starkey	
13	Vinton Downtown Historic District	Vinton Downtown Historic District	August 7, 2024 (#100010683)	S. Pollard Street, Lee Avenue, W. Jackson Street, S. Maple Street; 37°16′48″N 79°53′52″W	Vinton	

== See also ==
- List of National Historic Landmarks in Virginia
- National Register of Historic Places listings in Virginia
- National Register of Historic Places listings in Roanoke, Virginia
- National Register of Historic Places listings in Salem, Virginia
