= Byrd High School =

Byrd High School may refer to:

- C. E. Byrd High School, Shreveport, Louisiana
- Douglas Byrd High School, Fayetteville, North Carolina
- Robert C. Byrd High School, Clarksburg, West Virginia
- William Byrd High School, Roanoke County, Virginia

== See also ==
- William Byrd High School Historic District
- L. C. Bird High School
