= McAfee Knob =

Location on the Appalachian Trail in Virginia

Coordinates: 37.392466°N 80.036274°W

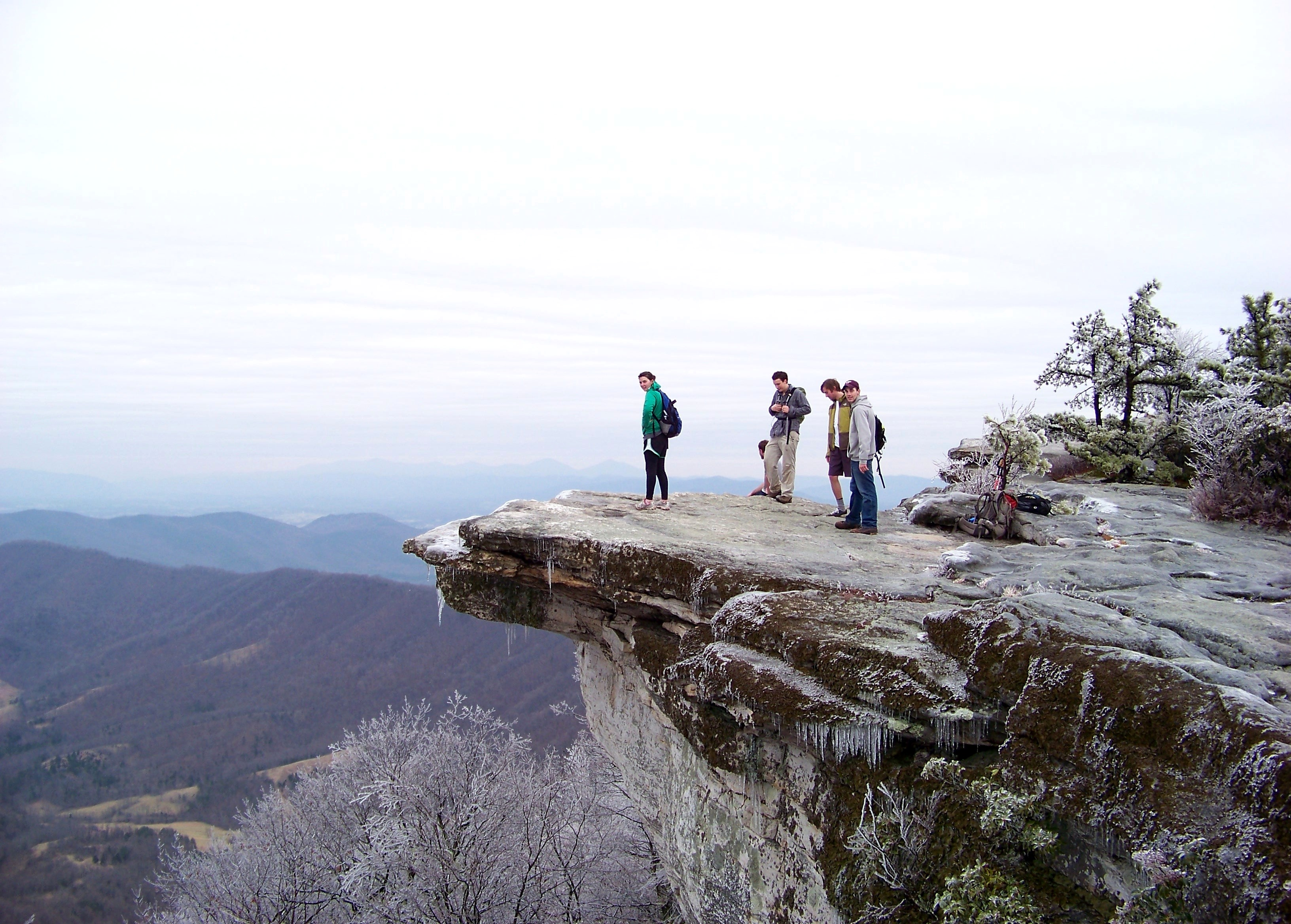
McAfee Knob

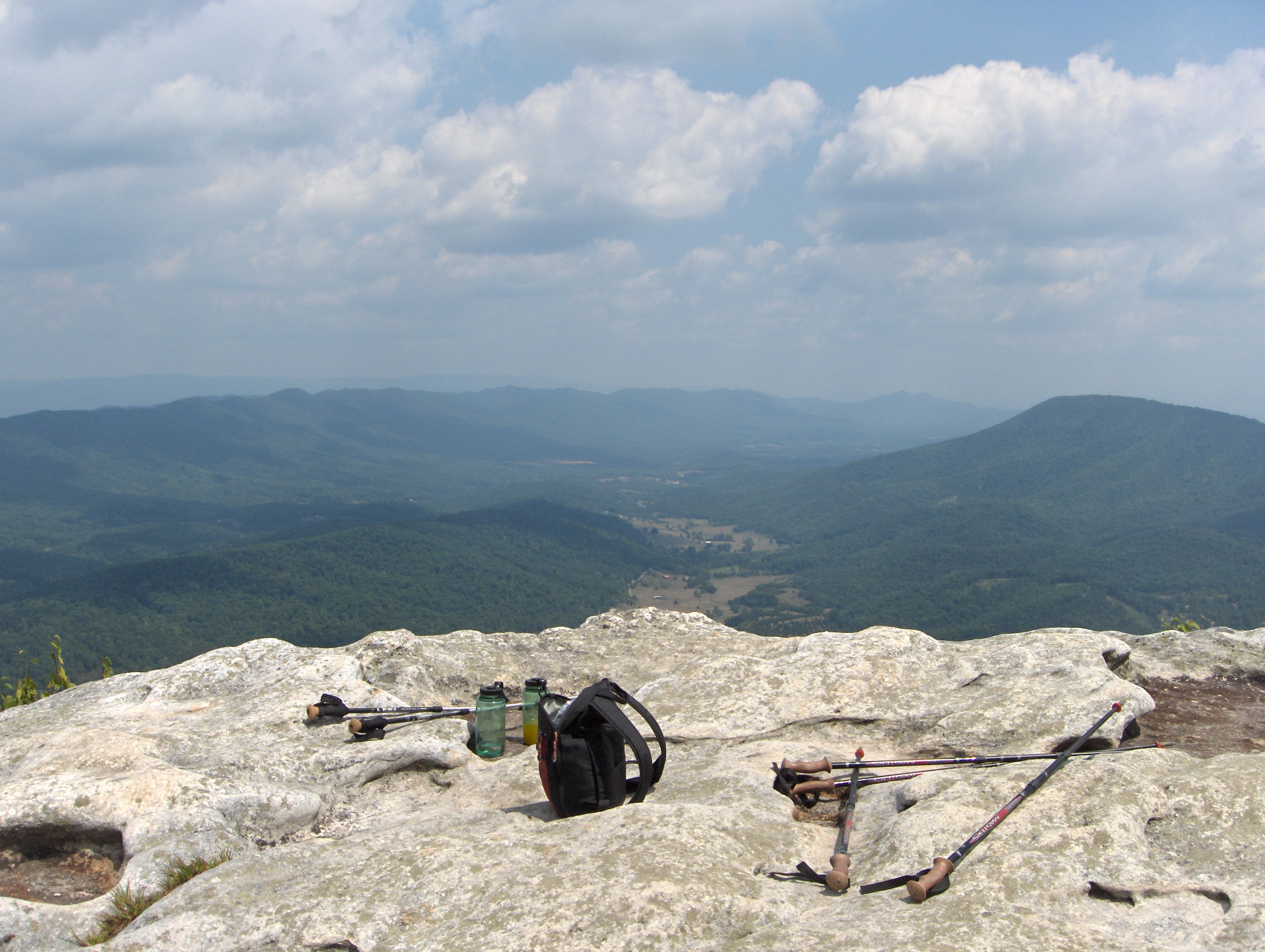
McAfee Knob near its edge

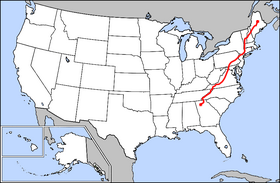
Map of the Appalachian Trail

McAfee Knob is a geological feature with an elevation of 3,197 feet (974 m) above sea level, located on Catawba Mountain in Catawba, Virginia, roughly 15 miles northwest of Downtown Roanoke. It is named for a Scottish-Irish 18th-century settler. Considered to be among the most iconic points along the Appalachian Trail, the vista offers panoramic views of the Catawba Valley, 1,600 feet (490 m) below.

== History and geography ==
- A "knob" is a rounded hill, or mountain, usually found in older mountain ranges.
- McAfee Knob is named after James McAfee (Mac-a-fee), a Scottish-Irish immigrant who settled in the Catawba Valley in the late 1730s.
- McAfee Knob is the tallest mountain in the area surrounding Catawba, at an elevation of nearly 3,200 feet (980 m).
- Much of Catawba Mountain was open farmland in the mid-1900s.
- McAfee Knob's ridge line is covered in a pine forest.
- McAfee Knob has been labeled the most photographed point along the Appalachian Trail.

== Appalachian Trail ==
McAfee Knob is located on the Appalachian Trail, a four-mile hike northbound from the intersection with VA-311 in Catawba, Virginia or a 16-mile (26 km) hike southbound from US-220 in Troutville, Virginia. The Appalachian Trail is a 2,190-mile (3,520 km) hiking trail following the Appalachian Mountains between Georgia and Maine, and is a unit of the National Park Service. The McAfee Knob hiking trail is along the Appalachian Trail and is managed by the Appalachian Trail Conservancy. This is a part of over 120 miles (190 km) of hiking trails in the Roanoke region, which are maintained by the volunteers of the Roanoke Appalachian Trail Club (RATC).

== Popular culture ==
- McAfee Knob is known as the most photographed point of the Appalachian Trail.
- McAfee Knob was prominently featured in the 2015 major motion picture A Walk in the Woods, starring Robert Redford and Nick Nolte. McAfee Knob appears on the movie's poster. The movie is based on travel writer Bill Bryson's 1998 autobiographical book, A Walk in the Woods: Rediscovering America on the Appalachian Trail. Unfortunately, viewers who are familiar with or have hiked the trail are aware that the McAfee Knob scene does not match up with the chronological order of a traditional northbound hike when taking into consideration their stated locations beforehand.
- McAfee Knob appeared in the October 2015 issue of the international, award-winning UK magazine, Wanderlust. The author of the article traveled the trail with Bill Bryson, stopping at his favorite locations, including McAfee Knob.

== McAfee Knob hike ==
=== General hiking description ===
The hike is moderately difficult with a gradual incline. McAfee Knob hiking trail ends on rocky mountain terrain that sticks out like a diving platform into the air. The trail offers a 270-degree panorama view of the Catawba Valley. North Mountain is also viewable to the west, the Tinker Cliffs to the north and the Roanoke Valley to the east. The hike is a climb of around 1,700 feet (520 m) and about 4.7 miles (7.6 km) to the top of the Knob from the VA-311 parking area.

As the altitude changes during the uphill part of the 4.4-mile (7.1 km) hike, it is advised to bring an additional layer of clothing, as it is colder at the summit. The average time it takes to get up and down the mountain is from 4 to 4.5 hours, so it is important to bring plenty of fluids and snacks. The trail offers picnic tables and resting spots throughout. The McAfee Knob trail is most popular in the spring and fall seasons, and there has been an average of around 100 hikers on the trail at once.

When hiking the trail in the winter, there will most likely be no one else there. Among other things to encounter are the spikes of frost from the icy moisture that form on objects such as rocks, leaves and frozen soil. The terms used to describe these coverings are "rime ice" and "hoarfrost". Rime ice is formed when wind-driven droplets of water collide and freeze on an object like a tree branch on the trail. Hiking in the winter and in the spring are completely different experiences.

=== Directions to the McAfee Knob hiking trail ===
Effective November 30, 2023, the parking lot at the McAfee Knob Trailhead on VA-311 was temporarily closed during the construction of the pedestrian bridge now spanning VA-311. Alternative parking is available at the Catawba Sustainability Center and along some shoulders on Route 864 (Old Catawba Road). The lot has re-opened once the bridge construction was completed in late 2024.

Trailhead parking is located on VA-311. Google map (and other mapping programs) directions may display directions to Rt. 779. These directions are incorrect and will take a visitor to private land, not McAfee Knob.

These are heavy use areas and parking lots may fill up early, especially on weekends and holidays.

VA-311 (McAfee Knob – National Park Service lot). (from Roanoke) Take I-81 south to exit 141. Go left on Virginia Route 419, Electric Road. Go 0.4 miles (0.64 km) to Virginia Route 311. Take right and go 5.6 miles (9.0 km) miles to A.T. access parking lot on left at top of Catawba Mountain. Exercise caution at all times when crossing VA-311, as the speed limit here is 55 mph.

From the right side of the Appalachian Trail, cross over to VA-311 parking area and walk 0.3 miles (0.48 km) north, where there will be an information kiosk on the left. Continue walking on the Appalachian Trail crossing and there will be four wooden walkways before reaching the Johns Spring Shelter in 1.4 miles (2.3 km). Continue for 0.1 miles (0.16 km) and there will be a shelter on the left and a spring with a white pipe projecting from rocks with a stream of water. Staying on this path for another 0.1 miles (0.16 km), there will be two campsites in which the trail bears to the left before the overnight sites. Remain on the trail and there will be an old fire road near a high voltage power line clearing. In 0.3 miles (0.48 km) after the power line, there will be an overlook on the left with the Catawba Valley in sight. Continue 0.5 miles (0.80 km) further up the trail to the McAfee Knob Spur Trail. Turn left and in less than 30 yards (27 m) will be the top of the Knob with the 270-degree panoramic view of the entire Roanoke Valley, North Mountain and Tinker Cliffs.

There are numerous sites to spend the night, such as the Campbell Shelter. This shelter has copious sites and an outhouse. A water source is about 0.1 miles (0.16 km) behind the shelter. Camping is prohibited around the immediate area surrounding McAfee Knob, such as the cliffs and rocks.

=== Rules ===
McAfee Knob is part of the Appalachian Trail, a unit of the National Park Service, and has the following rules:

- Maximum group size, backpacking/camping: 10
- Maximum group size, day hikes: 25
- No alcohol
- Dogs must be kept on leash at all times
- No camping or campfires on McAfee Knob or outside of seven designated areas (the only legal campsites are Johns Spring Shelter, Catawba Shelter and campsites, Pig Farm campsite, Campbell Shelter and Lambert’s Meadow Shelter and campsites)

=== McAfee Knob Task Force ===
In 2015, the McAfee Knob Task Force was founded. The group consists of 18 members who help the Appalachian Trail Conservancy's Ridge runners patrol. The group also assists at other hiking destinations in the area, such as Dragon's Tooth and Tinker Cliffs. In one year, the group logged over 500 volunteer hours on the trail. They counted over 9,000 visitors and engaged with more than 5,000 of them. They also hauled out 54 gallons of trash.

== Gallery ==
The overlook has a 270 degree panoramic view of the Catawba Valley. McAfee Knob is known as the most photographed spot on the A.T.

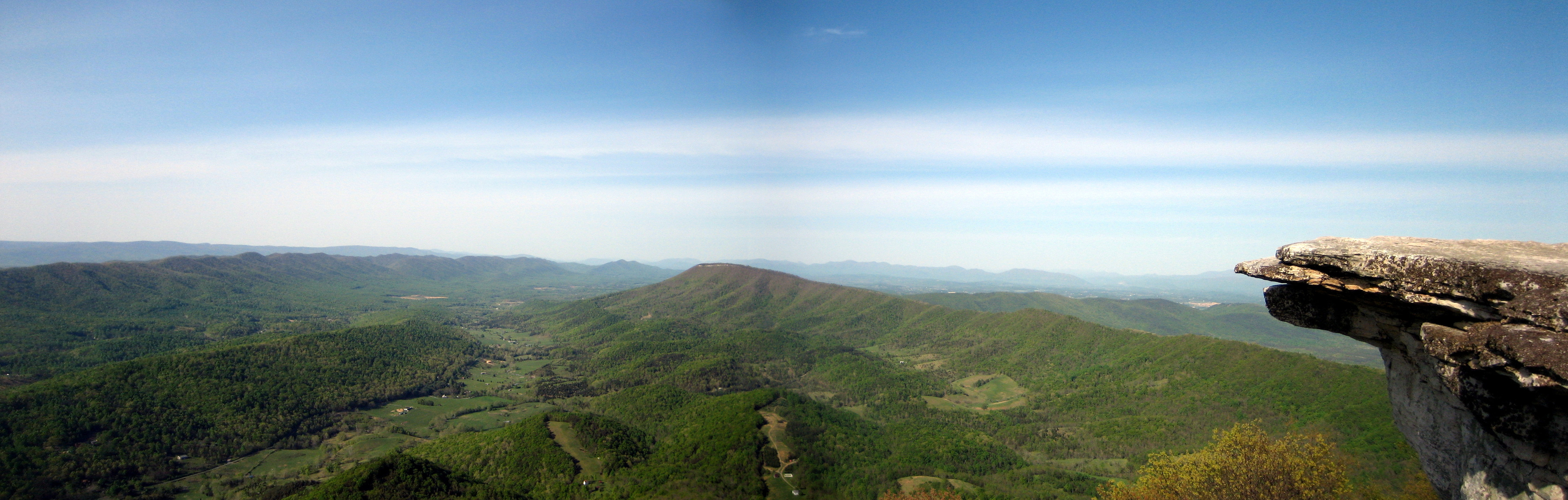
Panoramic image of the Catawba Valley from the McAfee Knob overlook
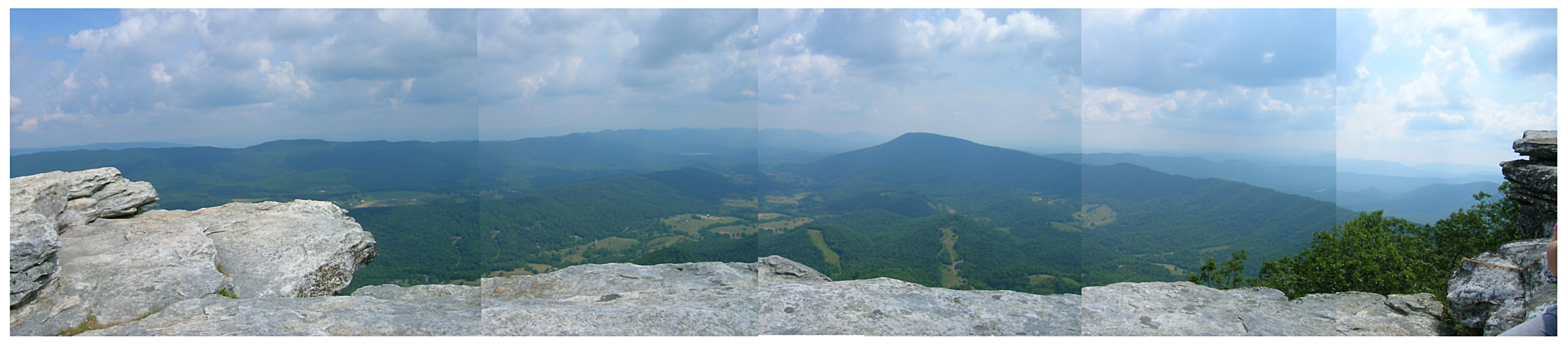
Another panoramic image of the Catawba Valley from the McAfee Knob overlook
