= Roland E. Cook Elementary School =

Historic school building in Virginia, US

- Roland E. Cook School
- U.S. National Register of Historic Places
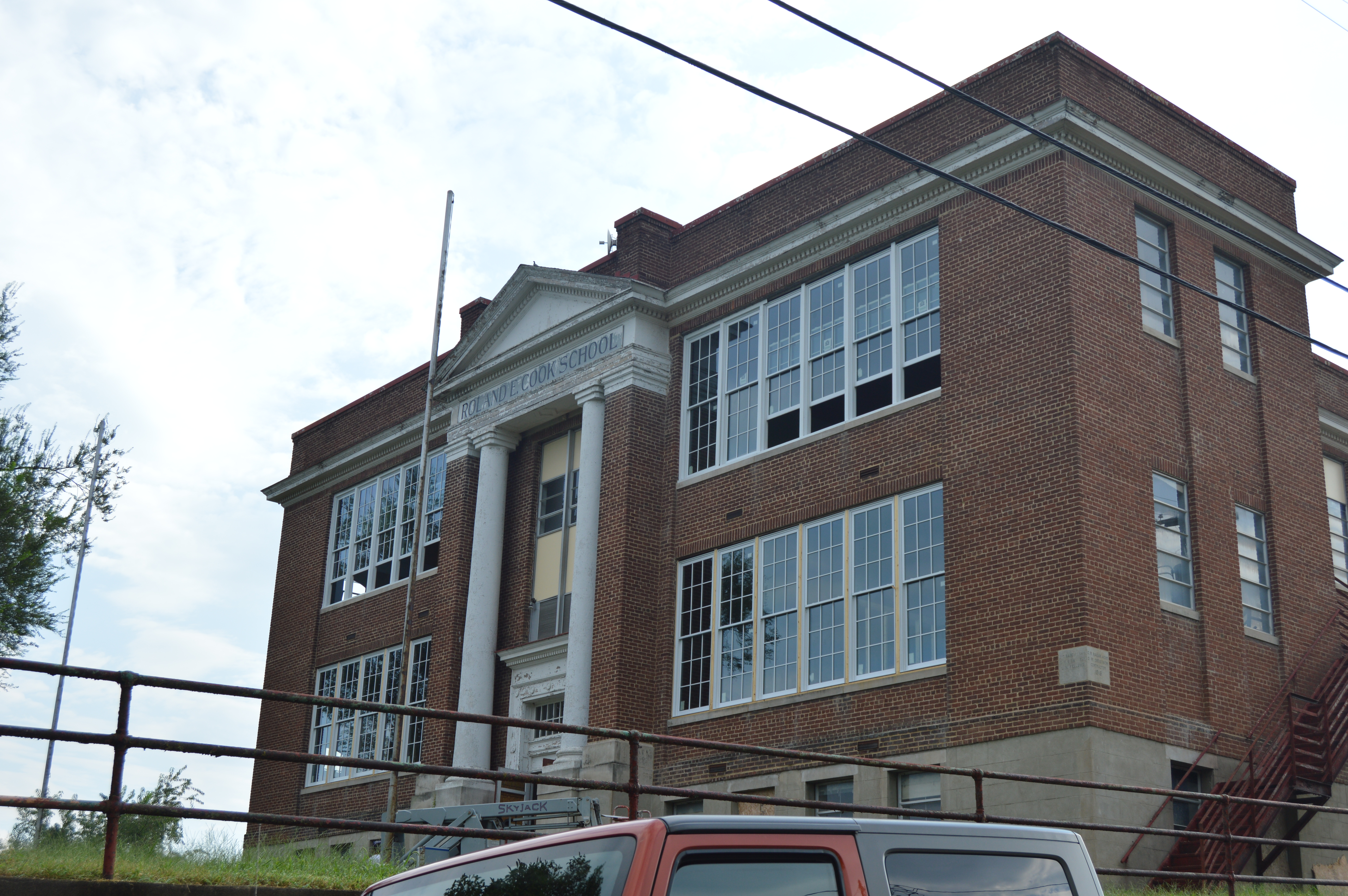

- Location within Virginia Location within the United States
- Location: 412 S. Poplar St., Vinton, Virginia
- Coordinates: 37°16′37″N 79°53′44″W
- Area: 1.05 acres (0.42 ha)
- Built: 1915
- Architectural style: Classical Revival
- NRHP reference No.: 16000262
- Added to NRHP: May 12, 2016

The Roland E. Cook Elementary School is a historic school building at 412 South Poplar Street in Vinton, Virginia. Built in 1915 as a T-shaped Classical Revival structure, it was expanded in 1924 to its present H shape, at which time it became Vinton High School. It served as a high school until 1933, when the William Byrd High School was built, and was then converted to an elementary school. It originally served the area's white population during the Jim Crow period of segregated facilities, and was integrated in 1966–67. It closed in 1999, and was mothballed after a period of use by an alternative school.

The school was added to the National Register of Historic Places in 2016.

== See also ==
- National Register of Historic Places listings in Roanoke County, Virginia
