= Hollins, Virginia =

- Census-designated place
- Location within Shenandoah Valley Location within Virginia Location within the United States
- Coordinates: 37°20′23″N 79°57′11″W
- Country: United States
- State: Virginia
- Counties: Roanoke, Botetourt

Area
  - Total: 8.7 sq mi (22.5 km^{2})
  - Land: 8.7 sq mi (22.5 km^{2})
  - Water: 0 sq mi (0.0 km^{2})
- Elevation: 1,112 ft (339 m)

Population (2020)
  - Total: 15,574
  - Density: 1,790/sq mi (692/km^{2})
- Time zone: UTC−5 (Eastern (EST))
  - Summer (DST): UTC−4 (EDT)
- ZIP code: 24019
- Area code: 540
- FIPS code: 51-37880
- GNIS feature ID: 1499567

Hollins is a census-designated place (CDP) in Botetourt and Roanoke County, Virginia, United States. Hollins covers much of the area known locally as "North County". The population was 15,574 at the 2020 census. It is part of the Roanoke metropolitan area. The area is also the home of Hollins University in addition to four properties listed on the National Register of Historic Places: the Black Horse Tavern-Bellvue Hotel and Office, Harshbarger House, the Hollins College Quadrangle, and Old Tombstone.

== Geography ==
Hollins is located at 37°20′23″N 79°57′11″W (37.339601, −79.953069).

According to the United States Census Bureau, the CDP has a total area of 8.7 square miles (22.5 km^{2}), all land.

== Demographics ==
=== 2020 census ===
As of the 2020 census, Hollins had a population of 15,574. The median age was 43.7 years. 18.7% of residents were under the age of 18 and 23.7% of residents were 65 years of age or older. For every 100 females there were 82.9 males, and for every 100 females age 18 and over there were 78.4 males age 18 and over.

100.0% of residents lived in urban areas, while 0.0% lived in rural areas.

There were 6,437 households in Hollins, of which 25.0% had children under the age of 18 living in them. Of all households, 44.2% were married-couple households, 17.5% were households with a male householder and no spouse or partner present, and 32.9% were households with a female householder and no spouse or partner present. About 33.7% of all households were made up of individuals and 18.0% had someone living alone who was 65 years of age or older.

There were 6,801 housing units, of which 5.4% were vacant. The homeowner vacancy rate was 1.3% and the rental vacancy rate was 7.7%.

Racial composition as of the 2020 census
| Race | Number | Percent |
|---|---|---|
| White | 11,727 | 75.3% |
| Black or African American | 1,763 | 11.3% |
| American Indian and Alaska Native | 54 | 0.3% |
| Asian | 696 | 4.5% |
| Native Hawaiian and Other Pacific Islander | 6 | 0.0% |
| Some other race | 426 | 2.7% |
| Two or more races | 902 | 5.8% |
| Hispanic or Latino (of any race) | 902 | 5.8% |

=== 2000 census ===
As of the census of 2000, there were 14,309 people, 5,722 households, and 3,782 families residing in the CDP. The population density was 1,650.3 people per square mile (637.2/km^{2}). There were 5,947 housing units at an average density of 685.9/sq mi (264.8/km^{2}). The racial makeup of the CDP was 90.68% White, 5.98% African American, 0.18% Native American, 1.86% Asian, 0.01% Pacific Islander, 0.39% from other races, and 0.91% from two or more races. Hispanic or Latino of any race were 1.03% of the population.

There were 5,722 households, out of which 26.2% had children under the age of 18 living with them, 54.0% were married couples living together, 9.2% had a female householder with no husband present, and 33.9% were non-families. 30.7% of all households were made up of individuals, and 15.5% had someone living alone who was 65 years of age or older. The average household size was 2.26 and the average family size was 2.80.

In the CDP, the population was spread out, with 19.1% under the age of 18, 9.2% from 18 to 24, 24.5% from 25 to 44, 24.8% from 45 to 64, and 22.4% who were 65 years of age or older. The median age was 43 years. For every 100 females there were 77.7 males. For every 100 females age 18 and over, there were 70.7 males.

The median income for a household in the CDP was $42,264, and the median income for a family was $50,000. Males had a median income of $36,326 versus $25,599 for females. The per capita income for the CDP was $21,984. About 1.9% of families and 4.9% of the population were below the poverty line, including 3.4% of those under age 18 and 6.8% of those age 65 or over.

== Climate ==
The climate in this area is characterized by hot, humid summers and generally mild to cool winters. According to the Köppen Climate Classification system, Hollins has a humid subtropical climate, abbreviated "Cfa" on climate maps.
