= Gish Mill =

Historic mill in Virginia

- U.S. National Register of Historic Places
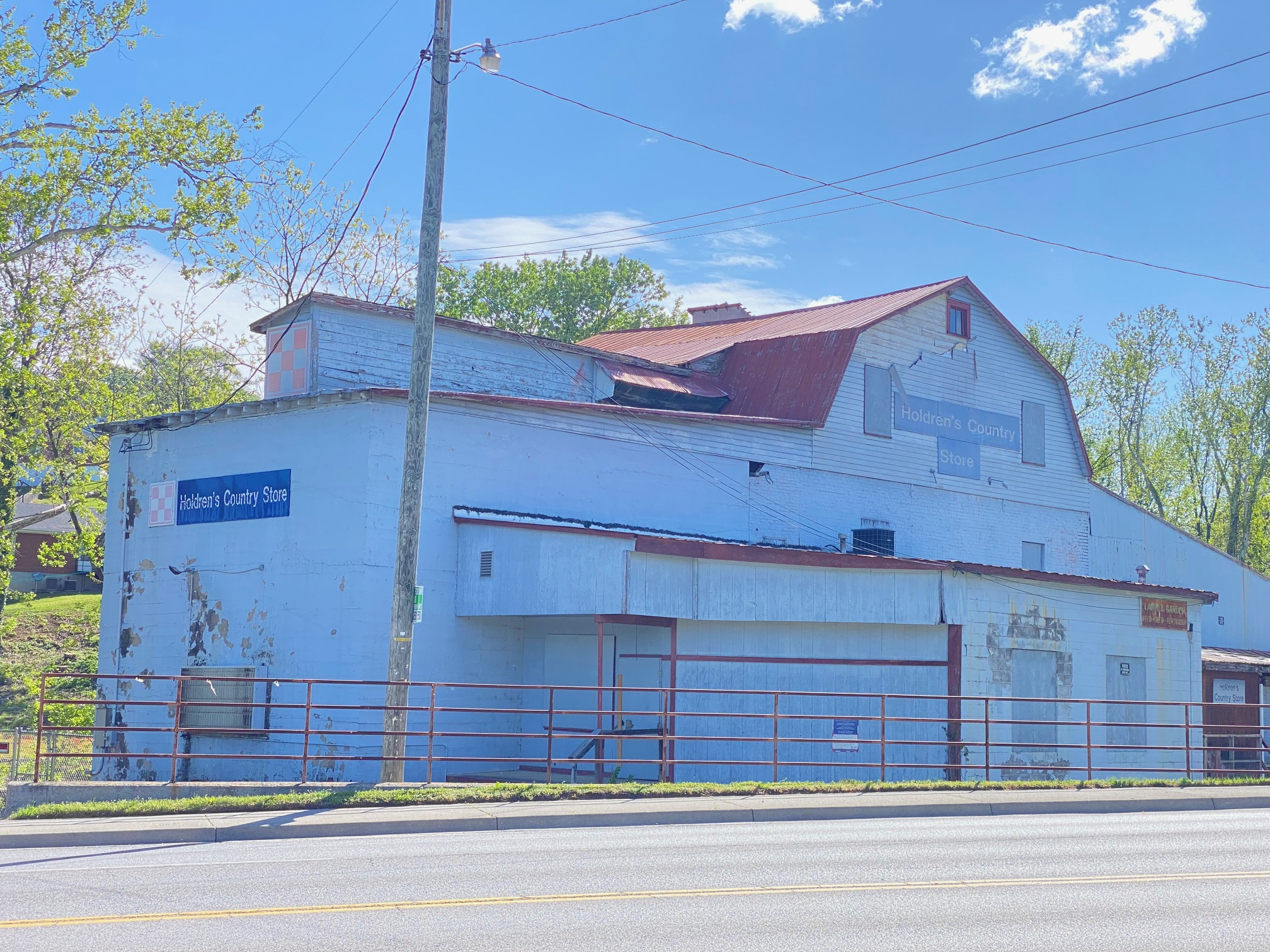
- Gish Mill in 2023

- Location within Virginia
- Location: 350 Gus Nicks Blvd. Vinton, Virginia, United States
- Coordinates: 37°17′00″N 79°53′59″W
- Built: 1846
- NRHP reference No.: 100007188
- Added to NRHP: November 18, 2021

Gish Mill (also known as Gish's Mill) is an historic gristmill located in Vinton, Virginia, United States.

Brothers Christian and David Gish, Sr., early settlers in the region, operated a mill on the site as early as 1797. The original section of the current structure dates to circa 1846, and was built on Glade Creek in Roanoke County by David Gish, Jr. The mill was one of several on Glade and nearby Wolf Creeks built by members of the Gish family, giving the area its informal name of Gish's Mills (later Gish's Mill) before incorporating as the Town of Vinton in 1884. The mill's importance in Vinton's history is reflected in its depiction on the town's official seal.

The facility originally utilized water-powered millstones for grinding, but was converted to an electric roller mill in the early 20th century. It survived at least two instances of fire, once in 1924 and again in 1940, yet saw continued use as a mill into the 21st century. The most recent tenant ceased operations in 2014, and after a period of disuse, the structure has been placed on the National Register of Historic Places. As of August 2023 it is in the process of restoration as a mixed-use development consisting of lodging, commercial, and restaurant space.

== See also ==
National Register of Historic Places listings in Roanoke County, Virginia
