= Catawba, Virginia =

Community in Virginia, United States

- Unincorporated community
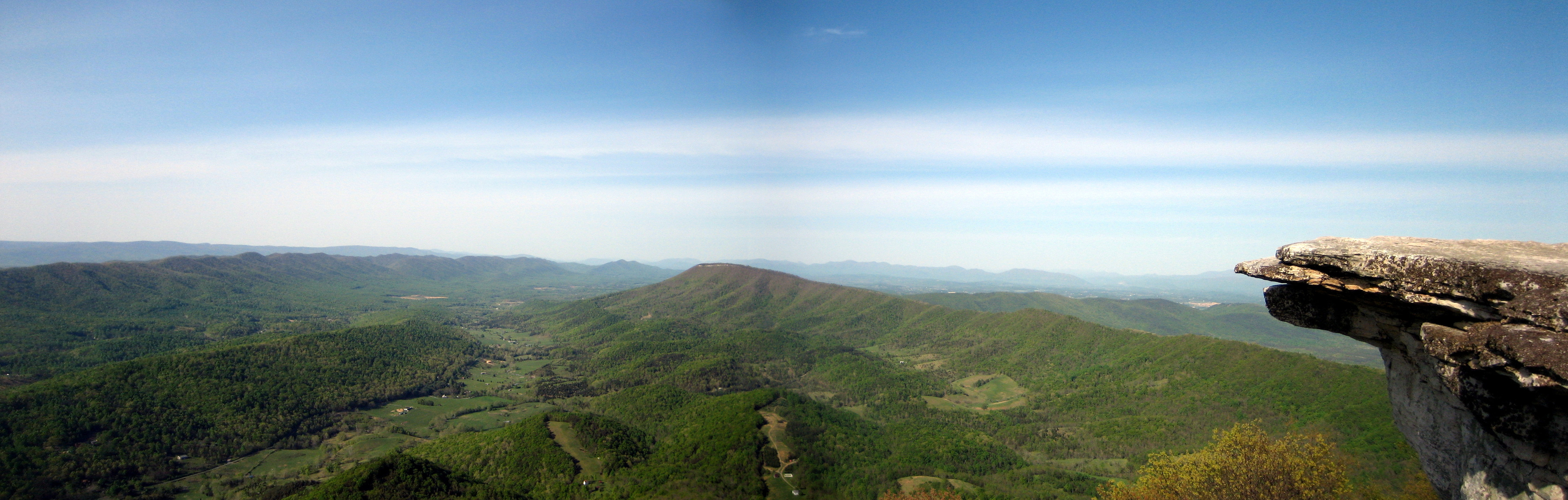
- Panoramic image of the Catawba Valley from the McAfee Knob overlook along the Appalachian Trail

- Location within the Commonwealth of Virginia
- Coordinates: 37°22′57″N 80°06′34″W
- Country: United States
- State: Virginia
- County: Roanoke
- Elevation: 1,742 ft (531 m)
- Time zone: UTC-5 (Eastern (EST))
  - Summer (DST): UTC-4 (EDT)
- ZIP code: 24070
- Area code: 540
- GNIS ID: 1492727

Catawba is an unincorporated community in the northern section of Roanoke County, Virginia, United States. Catawba occupies the Catawba Valley bound on the south by the north slope of Catawba Mountain and on the north by several mountains which form the border between Roanoke County and Craig County. The primary road through Catawba is State Route 311. Catawba has a post office with the zip code of 24070.

Catawba is known as a rural enclave of the Roanoke Valley with its farms, bed and breakfasts, and the Homeplace Restaurant. The Catawba Hospital, a mental health facility operated by the Commonwealth of Virginia, is near Route 311 and traces its history back to a resort established in 1857 to take advantage of the believed healing properties of a sulfur and limestone spring. Route 311 intersects State Route 785, which connects to Blacksburg, and State Route 779, which connects to Daleville, in Catawba.

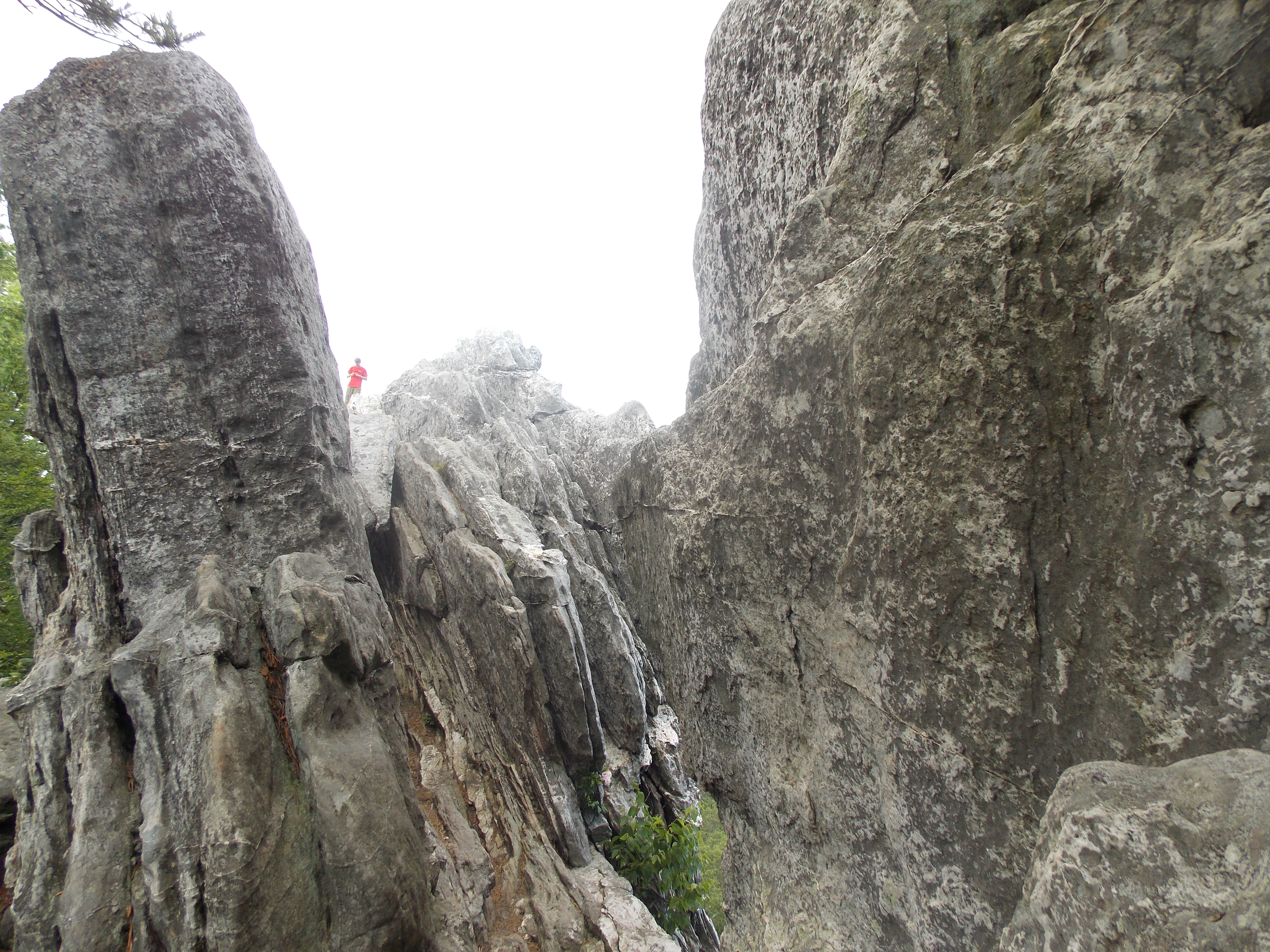
Dragon Tooth, Virginia

The Appalachian Trail passes through the Catawba area and provides access to three notable trail landmarks, Dragon's Tooth, McAfee Knob, and Tinker Cliffs. These three landmarks are referred to as the Triple Crown of hiking in Virginia, and experienced hikers can climb to all three overlooks in a 32-mile loop. The Homeplace Restaurant was a popular eatery for through hikers on the trail before it closed in 2020.

Audie Murphy was killed in a plane crash near Catawba in 1971; a monument has since been erected at the crash site.

The Anderson-Doosing Farm and Johnsville Meetinghouse are listed on the National Register of Historic Places.
