= Anderson–Doosing Farm =

Historic house in Virginia, United States

- U.S. National Register of Historic Places
- U.S. Historic district
- Virginia Landmarks Register
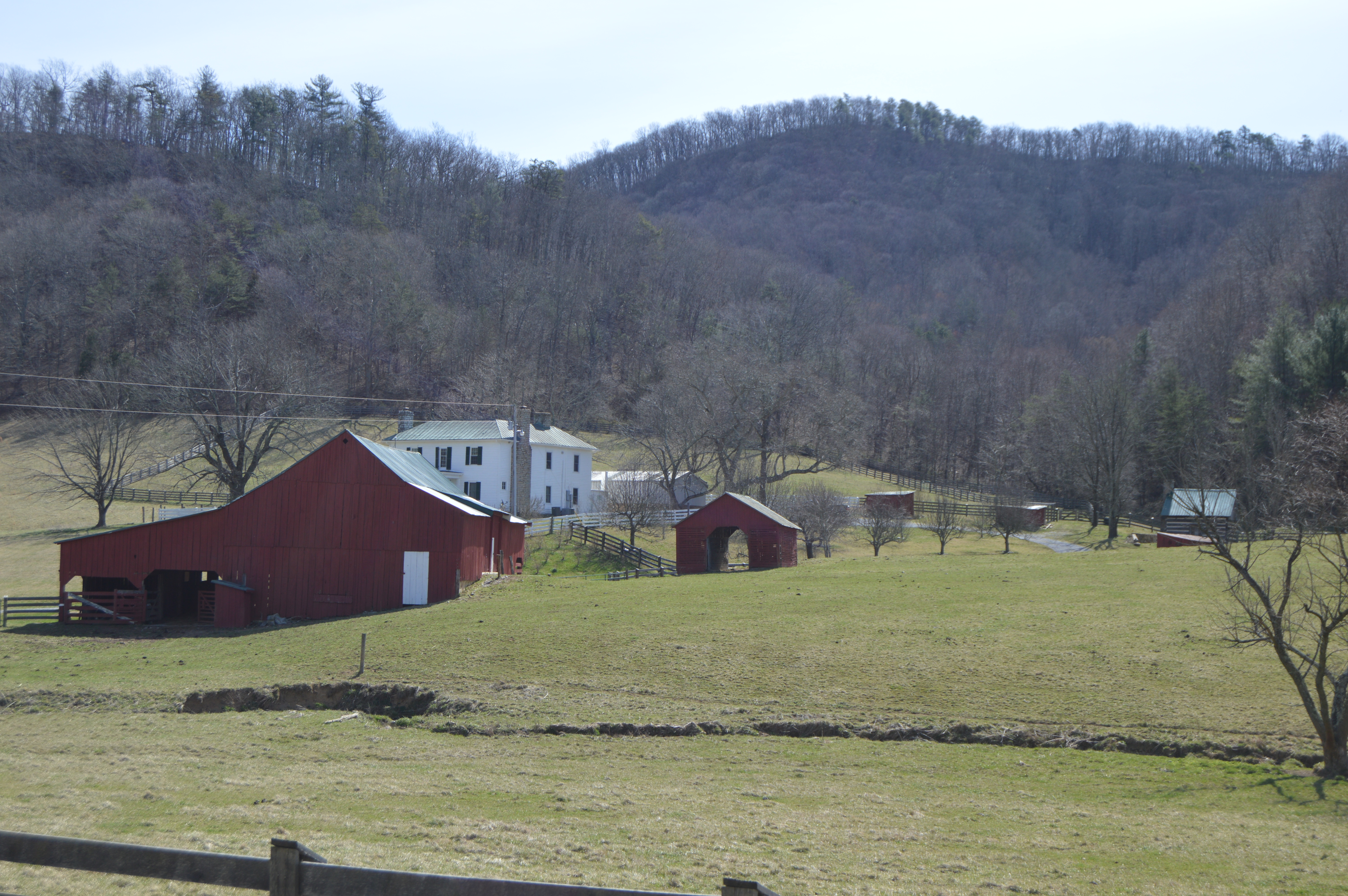
- Overview from the north

- Location within Virginia Location within the United States
- Location: 7474 Blacksburg Road, Catawba, Virginia
- Coordinates: 37°19′52″N 80°11′52″W
- Area: 25 acres (10 ha)
- Built: c. 1830, c. 1883
- Architectural style: Greek Revival
- NRHP reference No.: 09000666
- VLR No.: 080-0009

Significant dates
- Added to NRHP: August 27, 2009
- Designated VLR: June 19, 2009

The Anderson–Doosing Farm is a historic home and farm located near Catawba, Roanoke County, Virginia. The farmhouse was built about 1883, and is a two-story, three-bay, Greek Revival style frame dwelling. It has a two-story rear ell. Also on the property are the contributing meat house, log cabin, equipment shed / blacksmith shop, two chicken houses, barn (c. 1830), privy (c. 1940), corn crib, and milking parlor (c. 1940).

It was added to the National Register of Historic Places in 2009.
