= Johnsville Meetinghouse =

Historic church in Virginia, United States

- U.S. National Register of Historic Places
- Virginia Landmarks Register
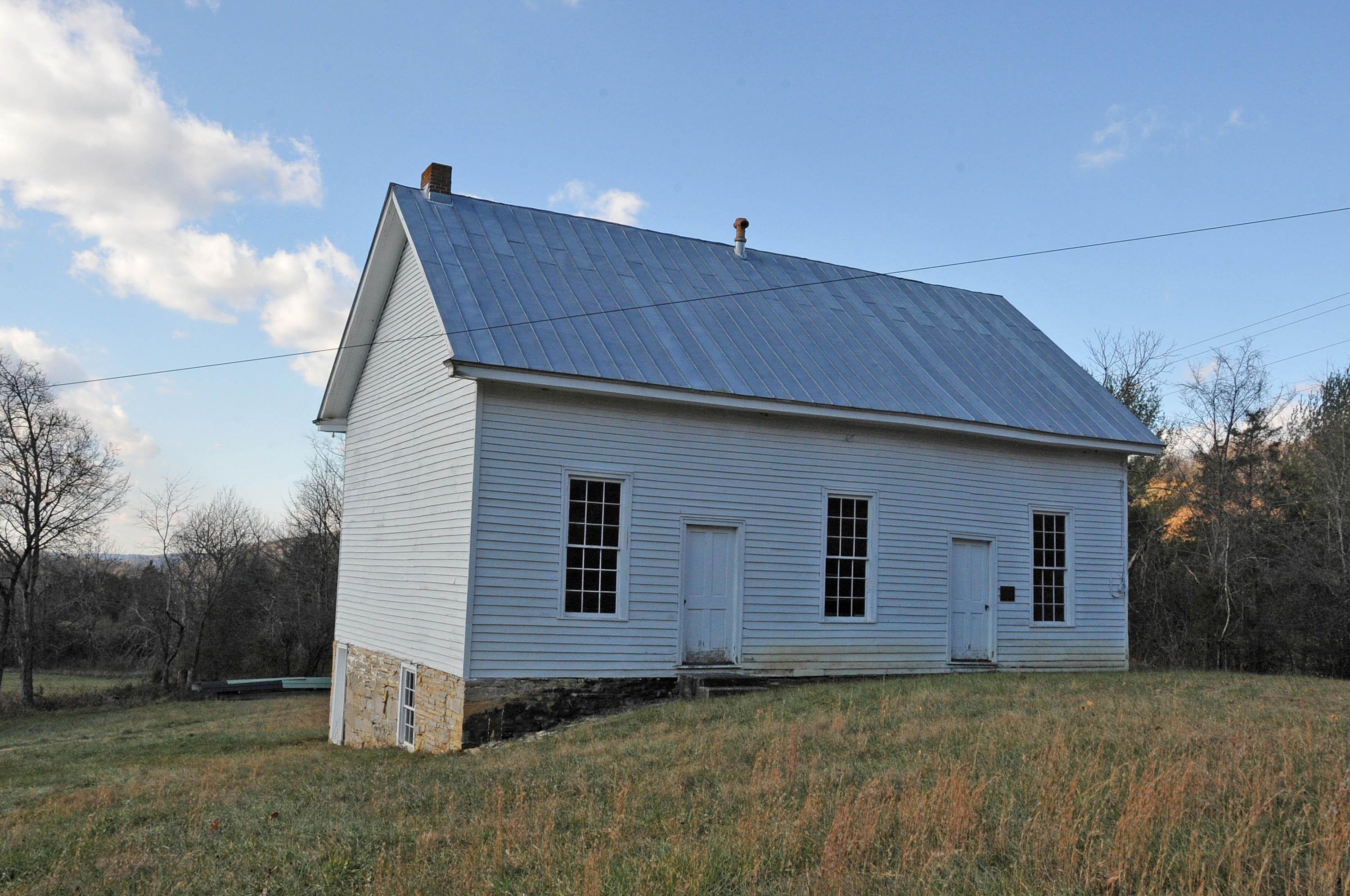

- Location within Virginia Location within the United States
- Location: 8860 Johnsville Church Rd., Catawba, Virginia
- Coordinates: 37°18′55″N 80°14′53″W
- Area: less than one acre
- Built: 1874
- Architect: Holsinger, John
- NRHP reference No.: 98001308
- VLR No.: 080-0122

Significant dates
- Added to NRHP: October 30, 1998
- Designated VLR: September 14, 1998

Johnsville Meetinghouse, also known as Johnsville Old German Baptist Meetinghouse, is a historic Old German Baptist Brethren meeting house located near Catawba, Roanoke County, Virginia. It was built in 1874, and is a simple, one story, one room building with five bays and a partial basement. It has a metal gable roof and features hand-planed clapboard siding and handmade window frames and glass.

It was added to the National Register of Historic Places in 1998.
