= Old Tombstone =

- U.S. National Register of Historic Places
- Virginia Historic Landmark
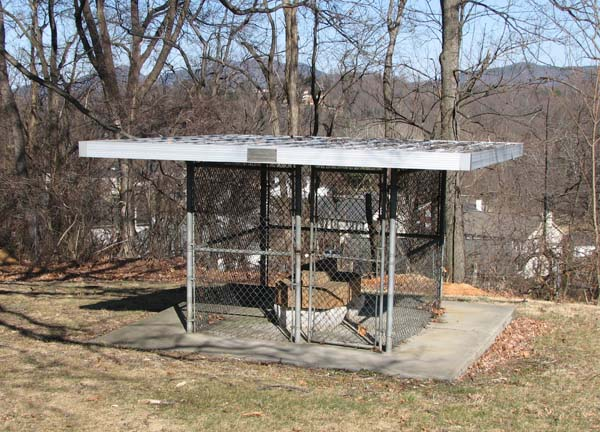
- Old Tombstone and its caged enclosure

- Location within Virginia Location within the United States
- Location: Hollins, VA
- Coordinates: 37°20′24″N 79°56′27″W
- Built: 1805
- Architect: Laurence Krone
- NRHP reference No.: 80004222
- Added to NRHP: 1980

Old Tombstone, also known as the Denton Monument, is a folk art tombstone listed on both the National Register of Historic Places and the Virginia Landmarks Register in the town of Hollins, Virginia, United States. Located in the Tombstone Cemetery, just east of Plantation Road (Virginia State Route 115), Old Tombstone is noted for its folk art elements as being unique to Southwest Virginia.

== Description ==
Old Tombstone is a monolithic freestone carving marking the grave of Robert Denton, who died in 1805, and is 4 ft (1.2 m) long, 2.6 ft (0.79 m) wide and, 1.6 ft (0.49 m) at its thickest point. The stone features a carving on its top exposing the head and torso of a child, with markings in German, English and Latin. The inscription reads:

Once loved, once valued, now avails me not; Though my relations have not me forgot . . .

== History ==
The monument was designed by Laurence Krone, a prolific Virginia-German carver. Its design featuring a carving of a child, although commonplace in New England during the period, is unique to Southwest Virginia. Krone met the Dentons after the family took him in after falling ill at the turn of the 19th century. Due to the generosity of the family, Krone carved the monument free of charge upon the death of Robert Denton.

By 1967, the ornate lid that once covered the sandstone face and bust of the child was stolen. As a result of the theft, the Hollins Lions Club constructed a roof and chain-link cage around the monument to protect it from vandals. Due to its architectural significance the monument was named to the Virginia Landmarks Register in 1977 and to the National Register of Historic Places in 1980. The cemetery where it is located, Tombstone Cemetery, takes its name directly from that of Old Tombstone.
