= William Byrd High School Historic District =

- U.S. National Register of Historic Places
- U.S. Historic district
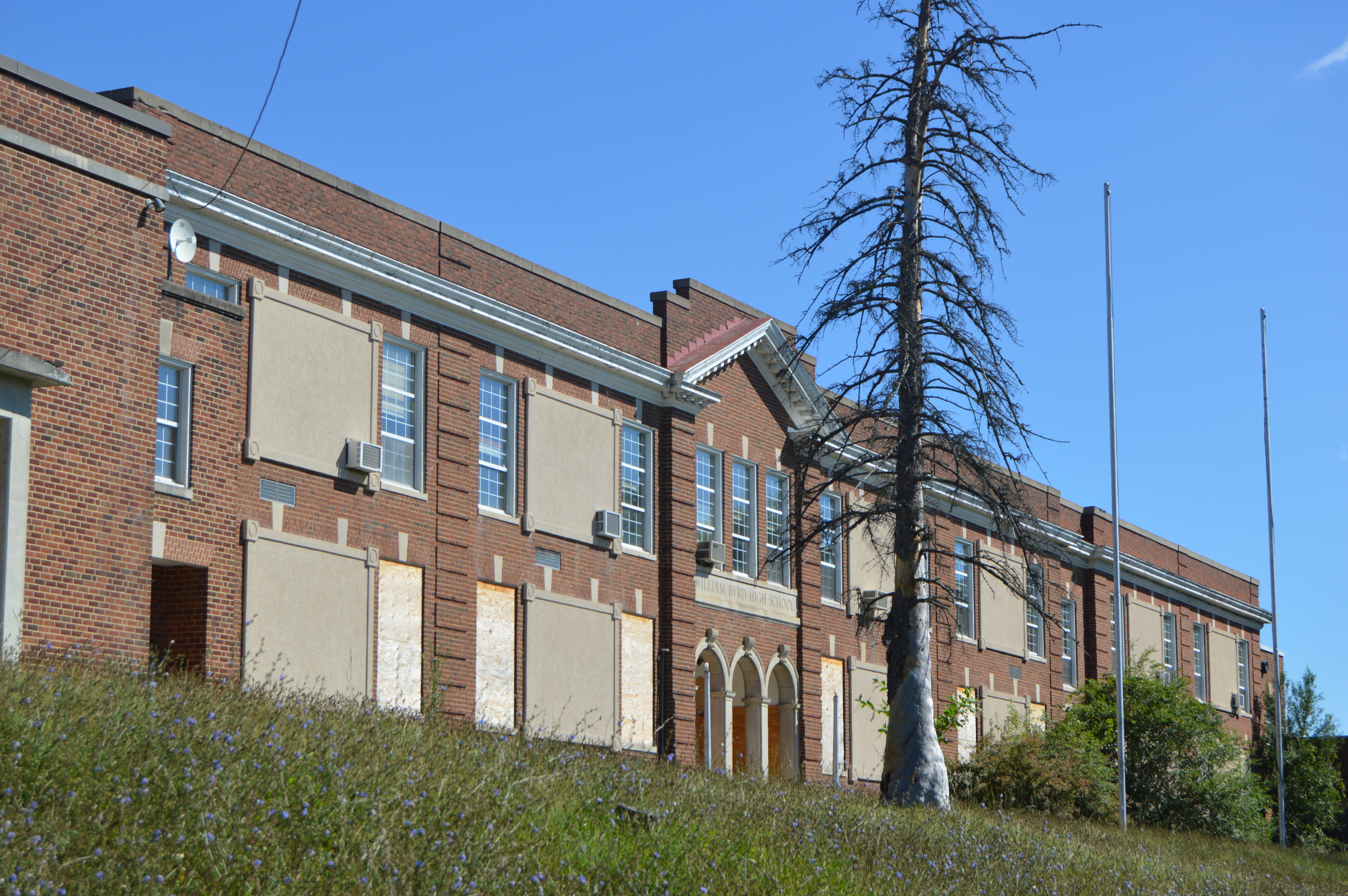

- Location within Virginia Location within the United States
- Location: 100 and 156 Highland Rd., Vinton, Virginia
- Coordinates: 37°16′56″N 79°54′2″W
- Area: 1.05 acres (0.42 ha)
- Built: 1933
- Architectural style: Classical Revival; Moderne
- NRHP reference No.: 100001082
- Added to NRHP: June 12, 2017

The William Byrd High School Historic District encompasses a historic school complex at 100 and 156 Highland Road in Vinton, Virginia. Built in 1933, the main building is a good local example of Classical Revival architecture, while a two-story annex added in 1938 exhibits Moderne styling. The facility also includes a single-story vocational training building (1940), and athletic fields. The school exhibits the change in school building trends, as differentiated from the earlier Roland E. Cook Elementary School (1915). Originally built as a segregated school serving white students, it was integrated in 1964–5, but closed in 1969.

The school was added to the National Register of Historic Places in 2017.

== See also ==
- National Register of Historic Places listings in Roanoke County, Virginia
