= Black Horse Tavern-Bellvue Hotel and Office =

Historic commercial building in Virginia, United States

- U.S. National Register of Historic Places
- Virginia Landmarks Register
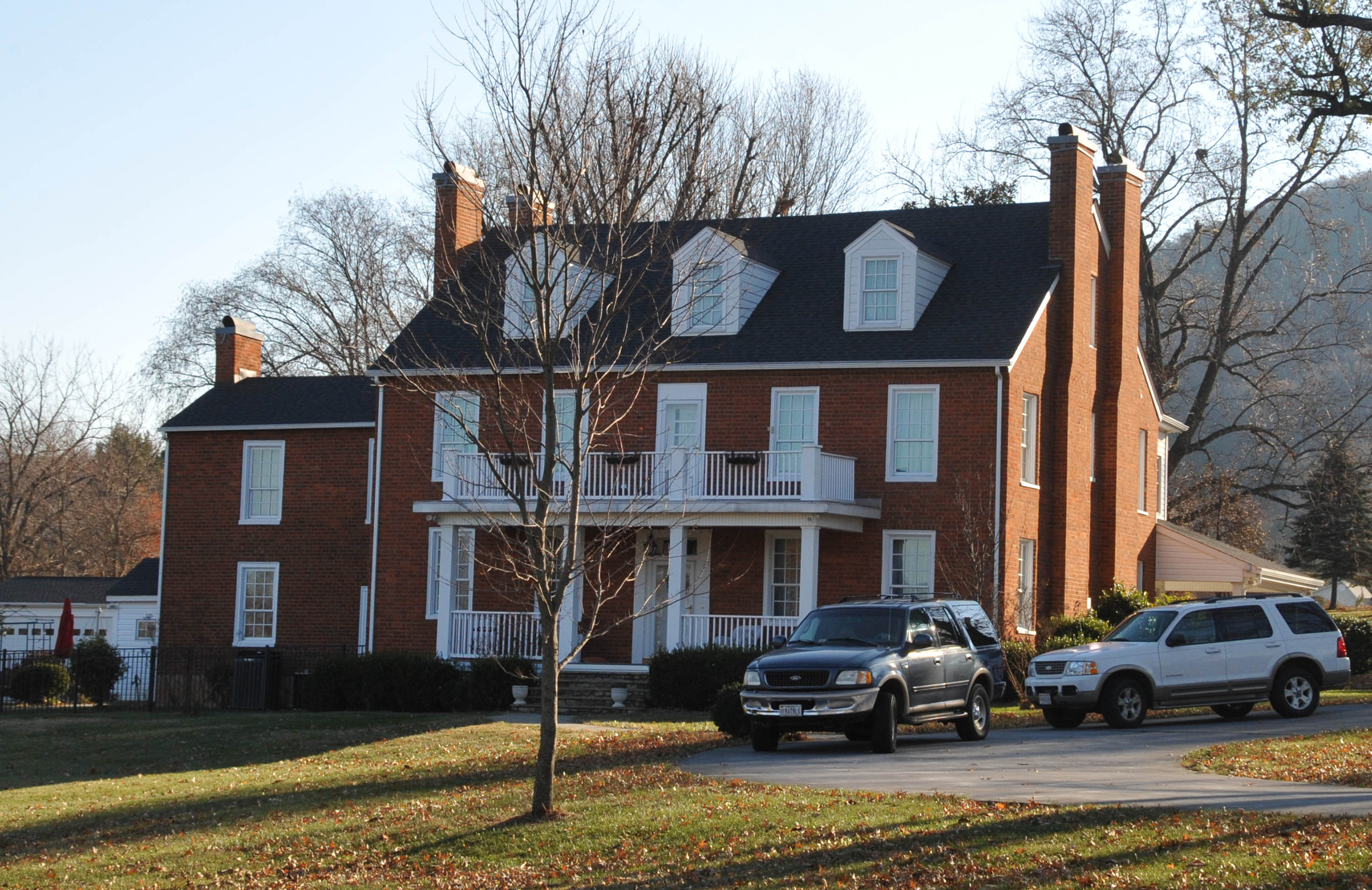

- Location within Virginia Location within the United States
- Location: 7223-7229 Old Mountain Rd., Hollins, Virginia
- Coordinates: 37°20′45″N 79°54′54″W
- Area: 4.2 acres (1.7 ha)
- Built: c. 1782, c. 1840, c. 1854
- Architectural style: Greek Revival
- NRHP reference No.: 01001521
- VLR No.: 080-5143

Significant dates
- Added to NRHP: January 24, 2002
- Designated VLR: June 13, 2001

Black Horse Tavern-Bellvue Hotel and Office is a historic inn and tavern complex located at Hollins, Roanoke County, Virginia. The complex consists of the Black Horse Tavern (c. 1782), the Greek Revival style Bellvue Hotel (also known as Kyle's Hotel) (c. 1854) and the temple-fronted, Greek Revival style brick Office (c. 1840). Other contributing resources on the property include a spring house (c. 1900) and a shed (c. 1930). The Black Horse Tavern is a simple, one story, three-bay log structure. The Bellvue Hotel is a two-story, five-bay, brick structure with a central-passage, double-pile plan. The office is a simple, one-story, one-bay brick structure. It features a wide frieze band and a front portico with a pedimented gable supported by squared Doric order columns. The buildings housed a school for physically and mentally handicapped children and the property became known as Bellevue School during the mid-20th century. The school closed in 1976, and the buildings house a single family residence.

It was added to the National Register of Historic Places in 2003.
