= Harshbarger House =

Historic house in Virginia, United States

- U.S. National Register of Historic Places
- Virginia Landmarks Register
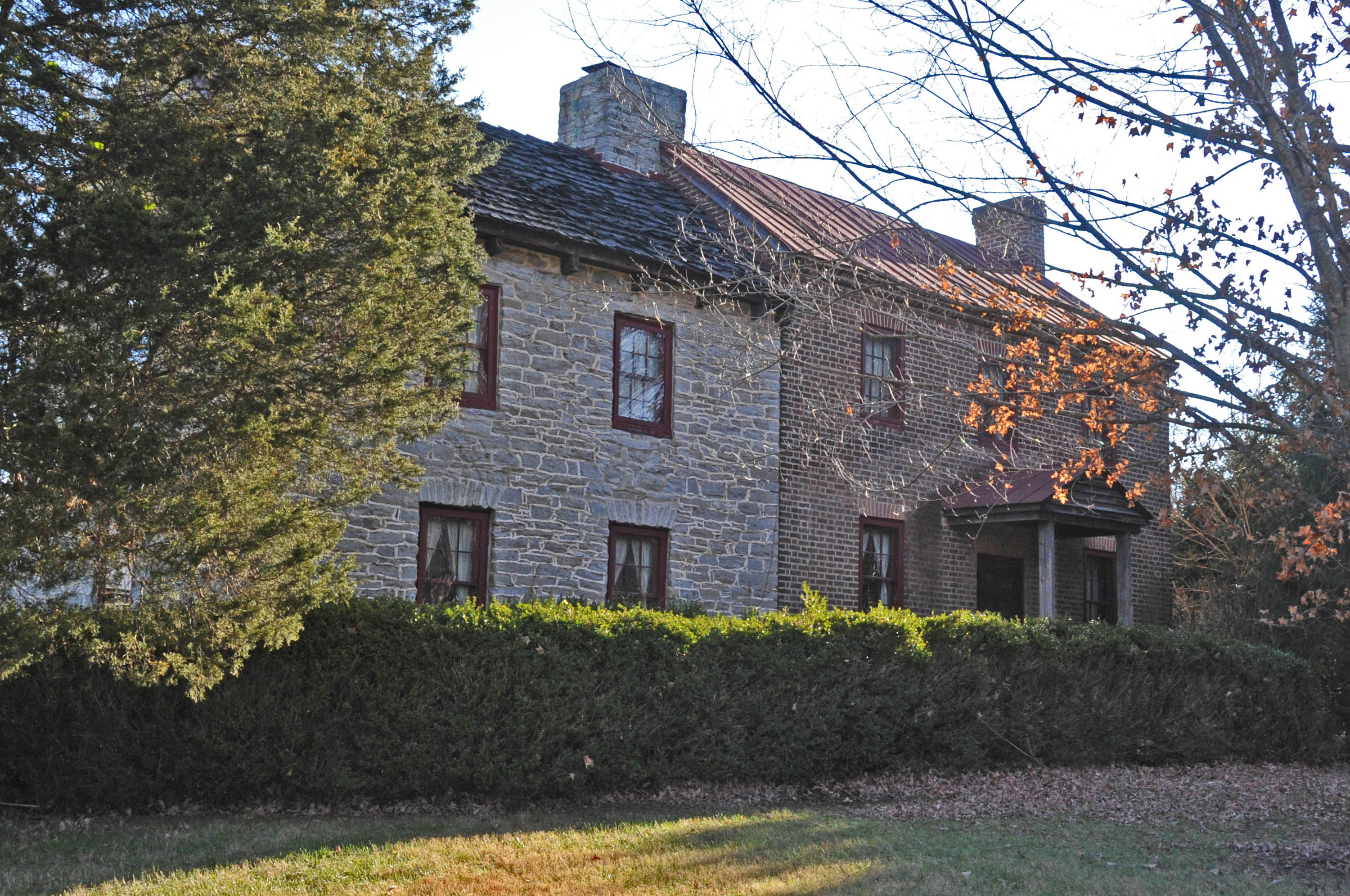

- Location within Virginia Location within the United States
- Location: 316 John Richardson Rd. (Co. Rt. 743), Hollins, Virginia
- Coordinates: 37°19′18″N 79°56′16″W
- Area: 2 acres (0.81 ha)
- Built: 1797
- Architectural style: Federal, Single-room plan
- NRHP reference No.: 92001390
- VLR No.: 080-0013

Significant dates
- Added to NRHP: October 15, 1992
- Designated VLR: October 9, 1991

Harshbarger House is a historic home located at Hollins, Roanoke County, Virginia. It is a two-story dwelling consisting of a late 18th-century, stone, two-story, one-room section with an early 19th-century brick addition. The stone section was built in 1797, and the brick section was added about 1825. A kitchen is attached to the main house by a modern addition.

It was added to the National Register of Historic Places in 1992.
